= Carmela Marie Cristiano =

American Catholic religious sister

Sister Carmela Marie Cristiano, S.C. (August 15, 1927 – August 1, 2011) was an American Catholic religious sister of the Sisters of Charity of Saint Elizabeth, who served the community as a teacher, social worker and activist. She received public attention for her high-profile battle with then-Jersey City Mayor Thomas J. Whelan over poor conditions and corruption at the city's orphan ward. In 1975, Sister Carmela became the first Sister to run for political office in New Jersey. She also founded two nonprofit corporations during her career.

== Biography ==
=== Early life ===
Cristiano was born to Francis and Mary (née Canonica) Cristiano in New York City. She joined the Sisters of Charity of Saint Elizabeth, which are headquartered in Convent Station, New Jersey, on March 25, 1945. Cristiano remained a Sister within the congregation for the next sixty-six years. She obtained a Bachelor of Science in education from the College of Saint Elizabeth.

=== Career ===
Sister Carmela worked as a schoolteacher throughout North Jersey for more than 20 years before entering social work. She taught at Catholic elementary schools in South Orange, Newark, New Brunswick, Jersey City, Totowa, Teaneck and Cliffside Park.

She became a social worker at the Hudson County Emergency Shelter beginning in 1968. In 1969, Cristiano openly complained to public officials in Jersey City about poor living conditions at the now defunct 6th floor Jersey City Medical Center orphan ward where she worked. She had been hired as the superintendent of the ward, which was used to house babies who had been orphaned in the city. In response, Jersey City officials terminated Cristiano in August 1969, leading to a public battle between her and Mayor Thomas J. Whelan. Cristiano refused to leave her office for several days upon learning that she had been fired by the Whelan administration. By openly criticizing corruption in Jersey City, specifically in the orphans' ward, Sister Cristiano has been credited with uncovering widespread extortion and misappropriation of public funds, which ultimately led to the conviction of Whelan and other officials in Jersey City and Hudson County. Mayor Whelan would be convicted of extortion as part of the "Hudson Eight" trial in 1971.

Sister Cristiano joined the faculty of the Jersey City YWCA in 1969, becoming the first Catholic Sister to teach at the organization. In 1971, she founded the Hudson Day Care Center Inc., located in Guttenberg, New Jersey. The center provided child care for mothers on welfare at eighteen day care centers throughout New Jersey. Her establishment of the Hudson Day Care Center led to her election as the state President of the New Jersey Federation of Business and Professional Women's Clubs.

Cristiano ran as a candidate for Hudson County Board of Chosen Freeholders in 1975, becoming the first religious sister to run for political office in New Jersey. She was unsuccessful in the election.

In 1984, she founded a daycare center in Brown Mills, Pemberton Township, New Jersey. She initially thought of retiring in Pemberton Township as well, but quickly become active in a number of other initiatives instead. Upon her "retirement", the day care center purchased a retirement home for her in the Country Lake Estates section of Pemberton Township, which she used to house underprivileged children visiting on weekends from urban North Jersey.

Cristiano further founded My Mother's House Inc., a nonprofit which places homeless people in new job vacancies. Cristiano became the executive director of My Mother's House in 1988. She ran the nonprofit organization out of her Country Lake Estates retirement home, where she would house homeless clients until they could be placed into a job. Donald Trump and Trump Entertainment Resorts, which operates casinos in Atlantic City, were the first to hire her formerly homeless candidates. John Gillespie, the former supervisor of Pemberton Township, has noted that everyone participated in the Mother's House program ultimately received a permanent job.

Former New Jersey Governor Brendan Byrne appointed Sister Carmela as one of the founding members of the New Jersey Commission on the Status of Women. Governor Thomas Kean then reappointed her to the Commission once he became governor. In 1987, Governor Kean further awarded her the Garden State Humanitarian Award, becoming the first recipient of the honor.

She also taught adult continuing-education classes at Burlington County College. She spearheaded the Operation Undercover, which provided underwear to Kosovar refugees who were temporarily housed at Fort Dix. Within Burlington County, Sister Carmela served as president of the local chapter of Madonna Dell'Assunta as well as the Soroptimist International of Rancocas Valley. She also volunteered at Deborah Heart and Lung Center.

In a 2007 interview with The Philadelphia Inquirer, Sister Carmela dismissed suggestions that she was an activist, telling the reporter, "I am active in things that matter to me."

Sister Carmela Marie Cristiano died on August 1, 2011, at the age of 83. The Mass of Christian Burial was held at St. Elizabeth Ann Seton Church in Whiting, New Jersey, with burial at Holy Family Cemetery in Convent Station, New Jersey.
