= Browns Mills Junction, New Jersey =

Populated place in Burlington County, New Jersey, US

- Unincorporated community
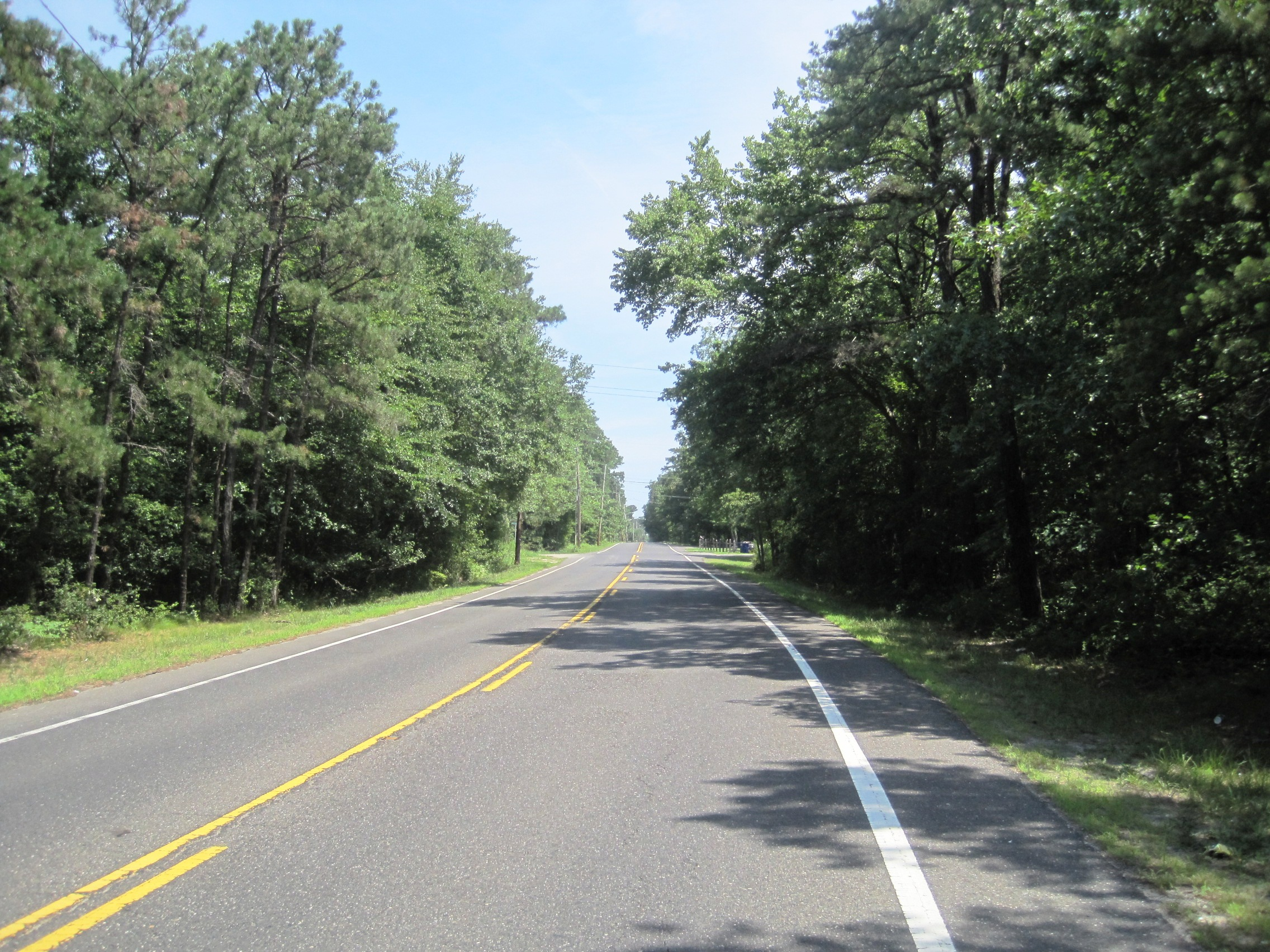
- Site of the crossing of the PRR and Junction Road (CR 645)

- Location of Browns Mills Junction in Burlington County (Inset: Location of county within the state of New Jersey) Browns Mills Junction (New Jersey) Browns Mills Junction (the United States)
- Coordinates: 39°56′54″N 74°35′24″W
- Country: United States
- State: New Jersey
- County: Burlington
- Township: Pemberton
- Elevation: 72 ft (22 m)
- Time zone: UTC−05:00 (Eastern (EST))
  - Summer (DST): UTC−04:00 (EDT)
- GNIS feature ID: 874982

Browns Mills Junction is an unincorporated community located within Pemberton Township in Burlington County, in the U.S. state of New Jersey. The site, located about 1.6 miles (2.6 km) southwest of downtown Browns Mills, is located at the crossing of Junction Road (County Route 645) and the Philadelphia and Long Branch Railway, later a part of the Pennsylvania Railroad. It was the site of a train station named Browns Mills in-the-Pines where a short branch connected the main line to Browns Mills. The settlement features a few houses along Junction Road and Mount Misery Road (also a part of CR 645 west of Junction Road) but is otherwise very forested as a part of the New Jersey Pine Barrens.
