= Elizabeth Coleman White =

Agriculture specialist who codeveloped and commercialized the first cultivated blueberry

- Born: October 5, 1871; New Lisbon, New Jersey, U.S.
- Died: November 11, 1954 (aged 83); Whitesbog, New Jersey, U.S.
- Occupation: Botanist
- Parent(s): Mary Fenwick; Joseph Josiah White
- Relatives: Barclay White (grandfather)

Elizabeth Coleman White (October 5, 1871 – November 11, 1954) was a New Jersey agricultural specialist who collaborated with Frederick Vernon Coville to develop and commercialize a cultivated blueberry.

== Biography ==
White was born in New Jersey, by one account on October 5, 1871, in New Lisbon, by another account in Whitesbog, whichis now in Pemberton Township. She was the oldest of four daughters of Quaker parents, Mary A. Fenwick and Joseph Josiah White. Elizabeth graduated from the Friends' Central School in Philadelphia, Pennsylvania, in 1887.

After 1887, she worked in the bogs helping to supervise cranberry pickers at her father's farm. During the winters, White continued her education with courses in first aid, photography, dressmaking, and millinery at Drexel Institute of Art, Science and Industry (now Drexel University). White belonged to several organizations, including being the first woman to become member of the American Cranberry Association and the first woman to receive a citation from the New Jersey Department of Agriculture.

In 1927, she helped organize the New Jersey Blueberry Cooperative Association.

White died of cancer in Whitesbog, New Jersey, on November 27, 1954, at the age of 83. She was cremated at Ewing Crematory in Ewing Township, New Jersey. Her ashes were distributed by airplane over the headwaters of Whitesbog in accordance to her will.

== Blueberry cultivation ==
White became interested in cultivating and harvesting the wild blueberries that grew around her family's cranberry farm. She wanted to grow them in the land between the cranberry bogs in the summer months of June and July to avoid any conflict with the fall harvest of the cranberries. White contacted United States Department of Agriculture botanist Frederick Coville after reading his publication, “Experiments in Blueberry Culture." Coville was persuaded to help White after she offered her family farm's unused land for Coville to experiment. White was in charge of the land and finding wild blueberry bushes to cultivate while Coville provided scientific plant knowledge.

Multiple factors were considered in the process of selecting which wild blueberries to cultivate, including taste, color, shape, and how long it took to ripen. White recruited local woodsmen to aid her in finding bushes deemed fit, paying them one to three dollars for every bush they found with berries that measured least 5/8 inches. The bushes were then tagged, and later uprooted and grafted by Coville. Of the 120 wild bushes they collected, only two met White and Coville's standards; from these they grew thousands of hybrid bushes, which they selectively bred to produce modern cultivated blueberries. In 1916, White and Coville successfully cultivated the first blueberry crop, selling it under the name Tru-Blu-Berries. White also came up with the idea to package blueberries in cellophane after seeing it used as a candy wrapper. With her extensive work in the Pine Barrens, White became a pioneer of landowners by being one of the first to devote their life and work to the Pine Barrens rather than solely using it as a means to make money.

== Child labor controversy ==
In 1910, a controversy arose when an agent of the National Child Labor Committee (NCLC) issued a report of child labor in the cranberry industry. As one third of the cranberry farms was harvested by J.J. White Inc., Elizabeth White wrote letters and spoke out against the report, defending her father's company and industry. The argument of NCLC investigators was that parents recruited their children under the age of 14 to work ten-hour shifts. White argued and reported that children played in the clean air and would gladly work at the request of parents. The controversy continued for four years until the NCLC printed a retraction in The Trenton Times and acknowledged White's efforts as peacemaker. White also conceded that children missed school between the months of September and October due to the harvest, and believed in an informal education for those who missed school due to this reason. White worked with the Women's Home Mission Council to provide babysitting services for younger children and informal educational and recreational programs for older ones.
