= Pemberton Township, New Jersey =

Township in Burlington County, New Jersey, US

- Township
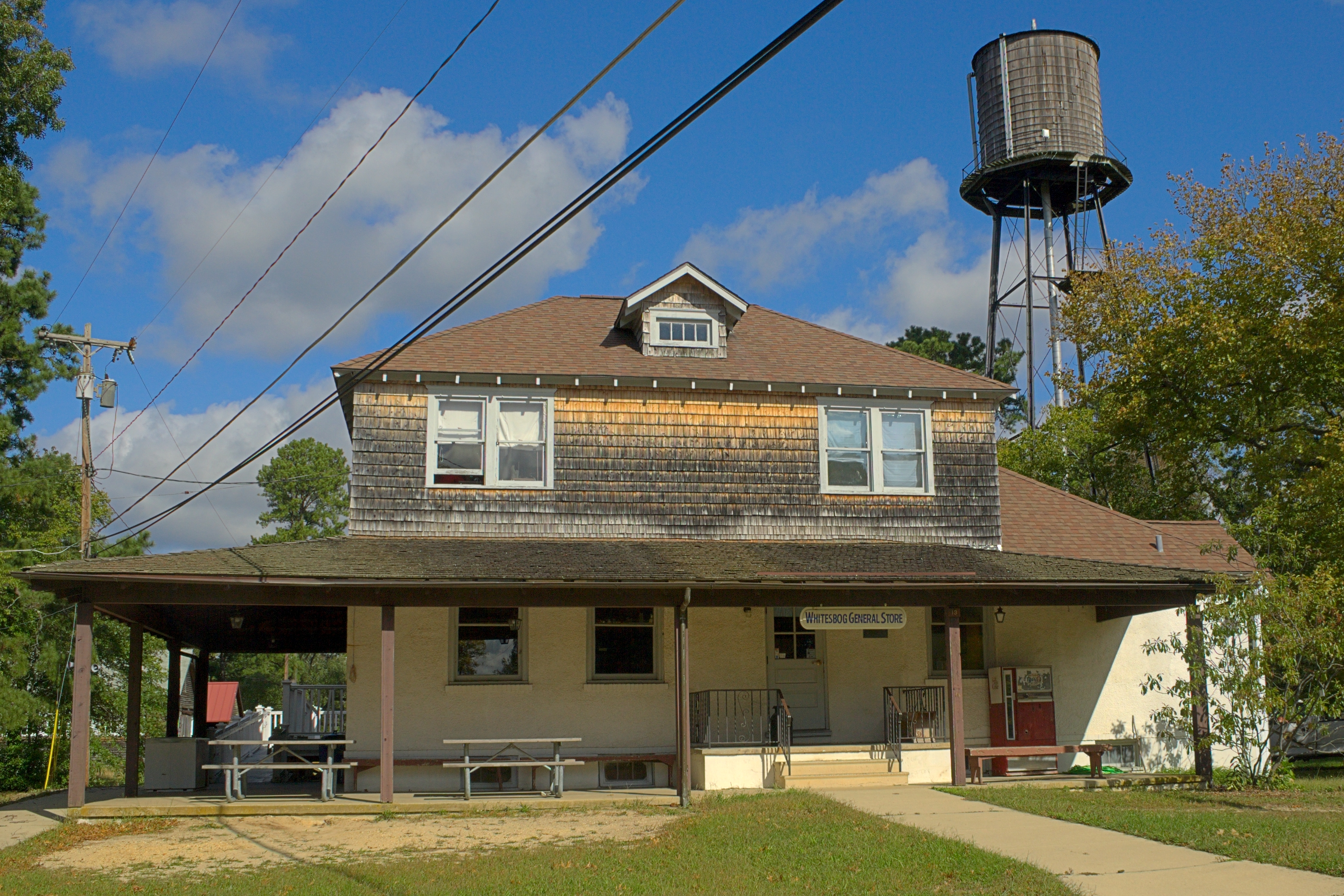
- Whitesbog General Store within the Brendan T. Byrne State Forest in Pemberton Township

- Seal
- Motto: "A Community of Lakes"
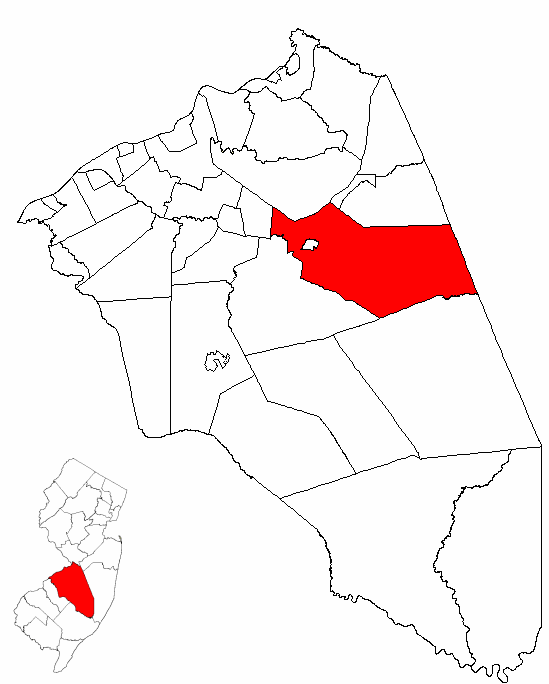
- Pemberton Township highlighted in Burlington County. Inset map: Burlington County highlighted in New Jersey.

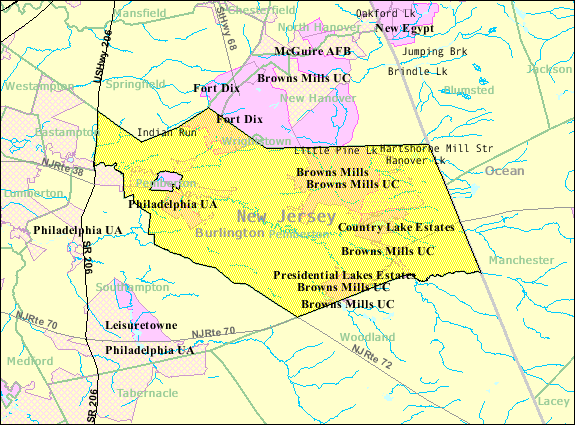
- Census Bureau map of Pemberton Township, New Jersey

- Location in Burlington County Location in New Jersey Location in the United States
- Coordinates: 39.958586°N 74.604606°W
- Country: United States
- State: New Jersey
- County: Burlington
- Incorporated: March 10, 1846

Government
  - Type: Faulkner Act (mayor–council)
  - Body: Township Council
  - Mayor: Matthew Bianchini (R, term ends December 31, 2026)
  - Administrator: Daniel Hornickel
  - Municipal clerk: Amy Cosnoski

Area
  - Total: 62.78 sq mi (162.61 km^{2})
  - Land: 61.56 sq mi (159.43 km^{2})
  - Water: 1.23 sq mi (3.18 km^{2}) 1.96%
  - Rank: 20th of 565 in state 4th of 40 in county
- Elevation: 66 ft (20 m)

Population (2020)
  - Total: 26,903
  - Estimate (2023): 27,011
  - Rank: 94th of 565 in state 4th of 40 in county
  - Density: 437/sq mi (169/km^{2})
  - Rank: 451st of 565 in state 30th of 40 in county
- Time zone: UTC−05:00 (Eastern (EST))
  - Summer (DST): UTC−04:00 (Eastern (EDT))
- ZIP Codes: 08015 Browns Mills; 08068: Pemberton; 08064: New Lisbon
- Area code: 609 exchanges: 726, 894
- FIPS code: 3400557510
- GNIS feature ID: 0882089
- Website: www.pemberton-twp.com

Pemberton Township is a township in Burlington County, in the U.S. state of New Jersey. As of the 2020 United States census, the township's population was 26,903, a decrease of 1,009 (−3.6%) from the 2010 census count of 27,912, which in turn reflected a decline of 779 (−2.7%) from the 28,691 total in the 2000 census. The township, and all of Burlington County, is a part of the Philadelphia metropolitan area.

Pemberton was incorporated as a township by an act of the New Jersey Legislature on March 10, 1846, from portions of New Hanover Township, Northampton Township (now known as Mount Holly), and Southampton Township. Portions of the township were taken to form Woodland Township on March 7, 1866. The township is named for James Pemberton, a property owner in the area. The township is part of the South Jersey region of the state.

== Geography ==
According to the U.S. Census Bureau, the township had a total area of 62.501 square miles (161.875 km^{2}), including 61.284 square miles (158.724 km^{2}) of land and 1.217 square miles (3.151 km^{2}) of water (1.95%).

Browns Mills (with a 2010 population of 11,223,), Country Lake Estates (3,943 as of 2010), Pemberton Heights (2,423 as of 2010) and Presidential Lakes Estates (2,365 as of 2010) are census-designated places and are located within Pemberton Township, while Fort Dix (1,765 out of a total population of 7,716 as of 2010) is a CDP located in parts of Pemberton Township, New Hanover Township and Springfield Township.

Other unincorporated communities, localities, and places located partially or completely within the township include Birmingham, Browns Mills Junction, Comical Corner, Commercial Corner, Deep Hollow, Earlys Crossing, Hanover Furnace, Lower Mill, Magnolia, Mary Ann Furnace, Mount Misery, New Lisbon, Ong's Hat, South Pemberton Township, Upper Mill, Upton, and Whitesbog.

Within the borders of the township lies the independent municipality of Pemberton borough, one of 21 pairs of "doughnut towns" in the state, where one municipality entirely surrounds another. The township borders Eastampton Township, New Hanover Township, Southampton Township, Springfield Township, Woodland Township and Wrightstown in Burlington County; and Manchester Township and Plumsted Township in Ocean County.

The township is one of 56 South Jersey municipalities that are included within the Pinelands National Reserve, a protected natural area of unique ecology covering 1,100,000 acres (450,000 ha), that has been classified as a United States Biosphere Reserve and established by Congress in 1978 as the nation's first National Reserve. Part of the township is included in the state-designated Pinelands Area, which includes portions of Burlington County, along with areas in Atlantic, Camden, Cape May, Cumberland, Gloucester and Ocean counties.

== Demographics ==
Historical population
Census	Pop.	Note	%±
1850	2,866		—
1860	2,672		−6.8%
1870	1,946	*	−27.2%
1880	2,086		7.2%
1890	1,805		−13.5%
1900	1,493		−17.3%
1910	1,679		12.5%
1920	1,444		−14.0%
1930	1,929		33.6%
1940	2,386		23.7%
1950	4,751		99.1%
1960	13,726		188.9%
1970	19,754		43.9%
1980	29,720		50.5%
1990	31,342		5.5%
2000	28,691		−8.5%
2010	27,912		−2.7%
2020	26,903		−3.6%
2023 (est.)	27,011		0.4%
Population sources: 1850–2000; 1850–1920 1850–1870; 1850 1870 1880–1890; 1890–1910 1910–1930; 1940–2000 2000; 2010 2020 * = Lost territory in previous decade.

=== 2010 census ===
The 2010 United States census counted 27,912 people, 9,997 households, and 7,078 families in the township. The population density was 455.5 per square mile (175.9/km^{2}). There were 10,749 housing units at an average density of 175.4 per square mile (67.7/km^{2}). The racial makeup was 67.53% (18,848) White, 20.49% (5,719) Black or African American, 0.37% (104) Native American, 2.89% (806) Asian, 0.13% (37) Pacific Islander, 3.00% (837) from other races, and 5.59% (1,561) from two or more races. Hispanic or Latino of any race were 11.92% (3,326) of the population.

Of the 9,997 households, 30.6% had children under the age of 18; 48.8% were married couples living together; 15.7% had a female householder with no husband present and 29.2% were non-families. Of all households, 23.2% were made up of individuals and 8.0% had someone living alone who was 65 years of age or older. The average household size was 2.74 and the average family size was 3.22.

24.6% of the population were under the age of 18, 9.3% from 18 to 24, 27.4% from 25 to 44, 27.0% from 45 to 64, and 11.7% who were 65 years of age or older. The median age was 36.5 years. For every 100 females, the population had 99.2 males. For every 100 females ages 18 and older there were 97.1 males.

The Census Bureau's 2006–2010 American Community Survey showed that (in 2010 inflation-adjusted dollars) median household income was $63,309 (with a margin of error of +/− $5,246) and the median family income was $73,757 (+/− $4,726). Males had a median income of $49,446 (+/− $2,760) versus $38,713 (+/− $3,404) for females. The per capita income for the township was $26,240 (+/− $1,523). About 7.9% of families and 10.7% of the population were below the poverty line, including 15.8% of those under age 18 and 5.8% of those age 65 or over.

=== 2000 census ===
As of the 2000 census, there were 28,691 people, 10,050 households, and 7,487 families residing in the township. The population density was 465.2 inhabitants per square mile (179.6/km^{2}). There were 10,778 housing units at an average density of 174.8 per square mile (67.5/km^{2}). The racial makeup of the township was 66.03% White, 23.12% African American, 0.46% Native American, 3.18% Asian, 0.08% Pacific Islander, 2.89% from other races, and 4.24% from two or more races. Hispanic or Latino of any race were 8.63% of the population.

There were 10,050 households, out of which 37.5% had children under the age of 18 living with them, 53.3% were married couples living together, 15.7% had a female householder with no husband present, and 25.5% were non-families. 20.4% of all households were made up of individuals, and 6.3% had someone living alone who was 65 years of age or older. The average household size was 2.80 and the average family size was 3.22.

In the township, the population was spread out, with 27.6% under the age of 18, 9.5% from 18 to 24, 31.5% from 25 to 44, 21.7% from 45 to 64, and 9.7% who were 65 years of age or older. The median age was 34 years. For every 100 females, there were 97.3 males. For every 100 females age 18 and over, there were 93.7 males.

The median income for a household in the township was $47,394, and the median income for a family was $52,860. Males had a median income of $36,572 versus $26,689 for females. The per capita income for the township was $19,238. About 6.2% of families and 9.3% of the population were below the poverty line, including 12.5% of those under age 18 and 7.8% of those age 65 or over.

== Economy ==
Portions of the township are part of an Urban Enterprise Zone (UEZ), one of 32 zones covering 37 municipalities statewide. Pemberton Township was selected in 1996 as one of a group of seven zones added to participate in the program. In addition to other benefits to encourage employment and investment within the UEZ, shoppers can take advantage of a reduced 3.3125% sales tax rate (half of the 6 5/8% rate charged statewide) at eligible merchants. Established in May 1996, the township's Urban Enterprise Zone status expires in May 2027. Since its inception, more than 180 township businesses have participated, raising nearly $30 million in revenues that have been reinvested into businesses in the UEZ.

Pemberton Township is home to Deborah Heart and Lung Center, founded in 1922.

== Government ==
=== Local government ===
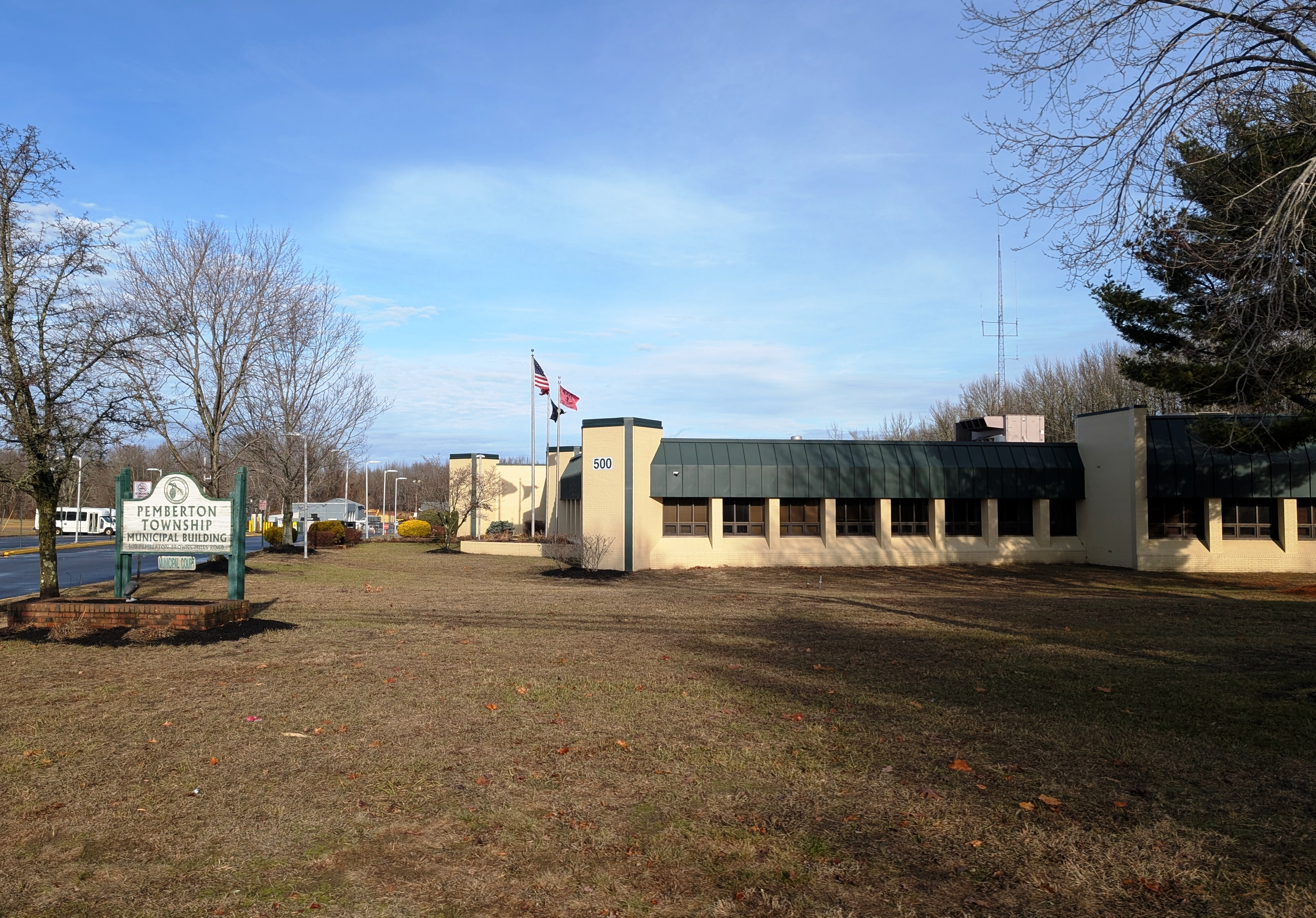
Pemberton Township Municipal Complex

Pemberton Township is governed within the Faulkner Act (formally known as the Optional Municipal Charter Law) under the Mayor-Council form of municipal government (Plan 1), implemented based on the recommendations of a Charter Study Commission as of January 1, 1991, changing from a five-member Township Committee form based on the results of a referendum passed by voters in 1989. The township is one of 71 municipalities (of the 564) statewide governed under the Mayor-Council form. The governing body is comprised of the Mayor and the five-member Township Council, all of whom are elected at-large in partisan elections to serve four-year terms of office on a staggered basis, with either two seats (and the mayoral seat) or three seats up for election during even-numbered years as part of the November general election.

Voters approved a November 2006 referendum to change from having all five council seats up for vote simultaneously to a system in which the elections are staggered every two years. Under the terms of the change, the two candidates receiving the highest number of votes in the November 2010 election would serve full four-year terms, with the three other winners serving two-year terms. As the three winners with the lowest number of votes in the 2010 election, the terms of Rick Prickett, Sherry Scull and Diane Stinney ended in December 2012.

Sherry Scull resigned from office in August 2015 due to issues related to her state pension. In September, the Township Council selected Thomas J. Cathers Sr., from a list of three candidates nominated by the Democratic municipal committee to fill the seat on an interim basis. In the November general election, Republican Jack Tompkins was elected to fill the balance of the term through December 2016.

In March 2016, the Township Council appointed former councilmember Kenneth Cartier to fill the seat expiring in December 2016 that became vacant following the death of Diane Stinney.

In March 2018, Elisabeth McCartney was appointed to fill the seat expiring December 2020 that became vacant following the resignation of Kenneth Cartier, who announced that he was moving out of the township. McCartney served on an interim basis until the November 2018 general election, when she was elected to serve the balance of the term of office.

As of 2026, the Mayor of Pemberton Township is Republican Matthew Bianchini, whose term of office ends December 31, 2026. Bianchini was appointed mayor on January 7, 2026 following the resignation of Jack K. Tompkins. Members of the Pemberton Township Council are Paul C. Detrick (D, 2024), Daniel Dewey Sr. (R, 2026), Donovan Gardner (D, 2024), and Elisabeth McCartney (D, 2024).. Joshua Ward (R, 2026) resigned effective October 9, 2026.

The police department consists of 57 officers and is headed by Chief David Jantas.

=== Federal, state, and county representation ===
Pemberton Township is located in the 3rd Congressional District and is part of New Jersey's 8th state legislative district.

For the 119th United States Congress, New Jersey's 3rd congressional district is currently represented Herb Conaway (D, Delran Township). New Jersey is represented in the United States Senate by Democrats Cory Booker (Newark, term ends 2027) and Andy Kim (Moorestown, term ends 2031).

For the 2026–2027 session, the 8th legislative district of the New Jersey Legislature is represented in the New Jersey Senate by Latham Tiver (R, Southampton Township) and in the General Assembly by Anthony Angelozzi (D, Hammonton) and Andrea Katz (D, Chesterfield Township).

Burlington County is governed by a Board of County Commissioners comprised of five members who are chosen at-large in partisan elections to serve three-year terms of office on a staggered basis, with either one or two seats coming up for election each year; at an annual reorganization meeting, the board selects a director and deputy director from among its members to serve a one-year term. As of 2026, Burlington County's Commissioners are: Director Felicia Hopson (D, Willingboro Township, term as commissioner ends December 31, 2027; term as director ends 2026), Deputy Director Allison Eckel (D, Medford, term as commissioner ends 2028; term as deputy director ends 2026), Randy Brolo (D, Lumberton, 2026; elected to an unexpired term), Tyler Burrell (D, Delran Township, 2027) and Tom Pullion (D, Edgewater Park, 2026).

Burlington County's constitutional officers are Clerk Joanne Schwartz (D, Southampton Township, 2028), Sheriff James H. Kostoplis (D, Bordentown, 2028) and Surrogate Brian J. Carlin (D, Burlington Township, 2026).

=== Politics ===
United States presidential election results for Pemberton Township 2024 2020 2016 2012 2008 2004
Year	Republican		Democratic		Third party(ies)	
Year	No.	%	No.	%	No.	%
2024	4,935	48.47%	5,129	50.37%	118	1.16%
2020	4,961	43.39%	6,273	54.87%	199	1.74%
2016	3,993	41.95%	5,155	54.16%	370	3.89%
2012	3,157	33.00%	6,304	65.90%	105	1.10%
2008	3,566	34.32%	6,680	64.30%	143	1.38%
2004	4,025	43.09%	5,223	55.91%	93	1.00%

As of March 2011, there were a total of 13,972 registered voters in Pemberton Township, of which 4,639 (33.2% vs. 33.3% countywide) were registered as Democrats, 2,433 (17.4% vs. 23.9%) were registered as Republicans and 6,893 (49.3% vs. 42.8%) were registered as Unaffiliated. There were 7 voters registered as Libertarians or Greens. Among the township's 2010 Census population, 50.1% (vs. 61.7% in Burlington County) were registered to vote, including 66.4% of those ages 18 and over (vs. 80.3% countywide).

In the 2012 presidential election, Democrat Barack Obama received 6,304 votes here (65.3% vs. 58.1% countywide), ahead of Republican Mitt Romney with 3,157 votes (32.7% vs. 40.2%) and other candidates with 105 votes (1.1% vs. 1.0%), among the 9,657 ballots cast by the township's 14,741 registered voters, for a turnout of 65.5% (vs. 74.5% in Burlington County). In the 2008 presidential election, Democrat Barack Obama received 6,680 votes here (63.9% vs. 58.4% countywide), ahead of Republican John McCain with 3,566 votes (34.1% vs. 39.9%) and other candidates with 143 votes (1.4% vs. 1.0%), among the 10,461 ballots cast by the township's 14,378 registered voters, for a turnout of 72.8% (vs. 80.0% in Burlington County). In the 2004 presidential election, Democrat John Kerry received 5,223 votes here (55.7% vs. 52.9% countywide), ahead of Republican George W. Bush with 4,025 votes (42.9% vs. 46.0%) and other candidates with 93 votes (1.0% vs. 0.8%), among the 9,379 ballots cast by the township's 13,510 registered voters, for a turnout of 69.4% (vs. 78.8% in the whole county).

Gubernatorial election results for Pemberton Township
Year	Republican		Democratic		Third party(ies)	
Year	No.	%	No.	%	No.	%
2025	3,400	43.61%	4,331	55.55%	66	0.85%
2021	3,122	50.96%	2,957	48.27%	47	0.77%
2017	2,049	42.55%	2,672	55.49%	94	1.95%
2013	3,060	58.61%	2,092	40.07%	69	1.32%
2009	2,536	44.11%	2,879	50.08%	334	5.81%
2005	2,157	40.55%	2,842	53.43%	320	6.02%

In the 2013 gubernatorial election, Republican Chris Christie received 3,060 votes here (57.9% vs. 61.4% countywide), ahead of Democrat Barbara Buono with 2,092 votes (39.6% vs. 35.8%) and other candidates with 69 votes (1.3% vs. 1.2%), among the 5,284 ballots cast by the township's 14,549 registered voters, yielding a 36.3% turnout (vs. 44.5% in the county). In the 2009 gubernatorial election, Democrat Jon Corzine received 2,879 ballots cast (49.8% vs. 44.5% countywide), ahead of Republican Chris Christie with 2,536 votes (43.9% vs. 47.7%), Independent Chris Daggett with 235 votes (4.1% vs. 4.8%) and other candidates with 99 votes (1.7% vs. 1.2%), among the 5,782 ballots cast by the township's 14,409 registered voters, yielding a 40.1% turnout (vs. 44.9% in the county).

United States Senate election results for Pemberton Township1
Year	Republican		Democratic		Third party(ies)	
Year	No.	%	No.	%	No.	%
2024	4,171	43.12%	5,262	54.40%	240	2.48%
2018	3,348	43.03%	3,928	50.49%	504	6.48%
2012	2,936	32.41%	6,020	66.45%	104	1.15%
2006	2,249	43.03%	2,792	53.41%	186	3.56%

United States Senate election results for Pemberton Township2
Year	Republican		Democratic		Third party(ies)	
Year	No.	%	No.	%	No.	%
2020	4,680	42.05%	6,225	55.93%	224	2.01%
2014	2,153	40.21%	3,086	57.64%	115	2.15%
2013	1,341	39.78%	1,986	58.91%	44	1.31%
2008	3,175	33.64%	6,019	63.78%	243	2.57%

== Education ==
The Pemberton Township School District serves students in pre-kindergarten through twelfth grade. The district is the singular district for most of the township, except for portions on the Fort Dix entity of Joint Base McGuire-Dix-Lakehurst; the school district is one of three choices for K-12 students on the property of the base.

The Pemberton Township district is one of 31 former Abbott districts statewide that were established pursuant to the decision by the New Jersey Supreme Court in Abbott v. Burke which are now referred to as "SDA Districts" based on the requirement for the state to cover all costs for school building and renovation projects in these districts under the supervision of the New Jersey Schools Development Authority. The school district serves Pemberton Township (including the communities of Browns Mills, Country Lake Estates, Pemberton Heights and Presidential Lakes Estates and the Pemberton Township portion of Fort Dix) along with Pemberton Borough. As of the 2021–22 school year, the district, comprised of nine schools, had an enrollment of 4,443 students. Schools in the district (with 2021–22 enrollment data from the National Center for Education Statistics) are Pemberton Early Childhood Education Center (with 416 students; PreK), Samuel T. Busansky Elementary School (281; 3–5), Denbo-Crichton Elementary School (850; K–5), Howard L. Emmons Elementary School (293; K-2), Fort Dix Elementary School (317; PreK-5), Joseph S. Stackhouse Elementary School (223; K-2), Marcus Newcomb Middle School (307; 6), Helen A. Fort Middle School (661; 7–8) and Pemberton Township High School (1,029; 9–12).

Students from Pemberton Township, and from all of Burlington County, are eligible to attend the Burlington County Institute of Technology, a countywide public school district that serves the vocational and technical education needs of students at the high school and post-secondary level at its campuses in Medford and Westampton.

Pemberton Township was the location of the main campus of Rowan College at Burlington County, formerly known as Burlington County College (BCC), the county's community college, having moved to its first permanent site in Pemberton Township in 1971. It was the main campus until 2015 when all Pemberton Campus classes were transferred to Mount Laurel. The last part of the Pemberton Campus closed in summer 2019.

== Emergency services ==
Pemberton Township is provided fire protection through an agreement with the Pemberton Township Fire Department (Burlington County Stations 181 [Browns Mills], 182 [Presidential Lakes] & 183 [Country Lakes]) and the Goodwill Fire Department (Burlington County Station 191).

Emergency Medical Services are provided through Capital Health Systems Basic Life Support Service. The agreement is provided at no cost to the taxpayers or the township, but the provider does bill your medical insurance for the services.

== Transportation ==
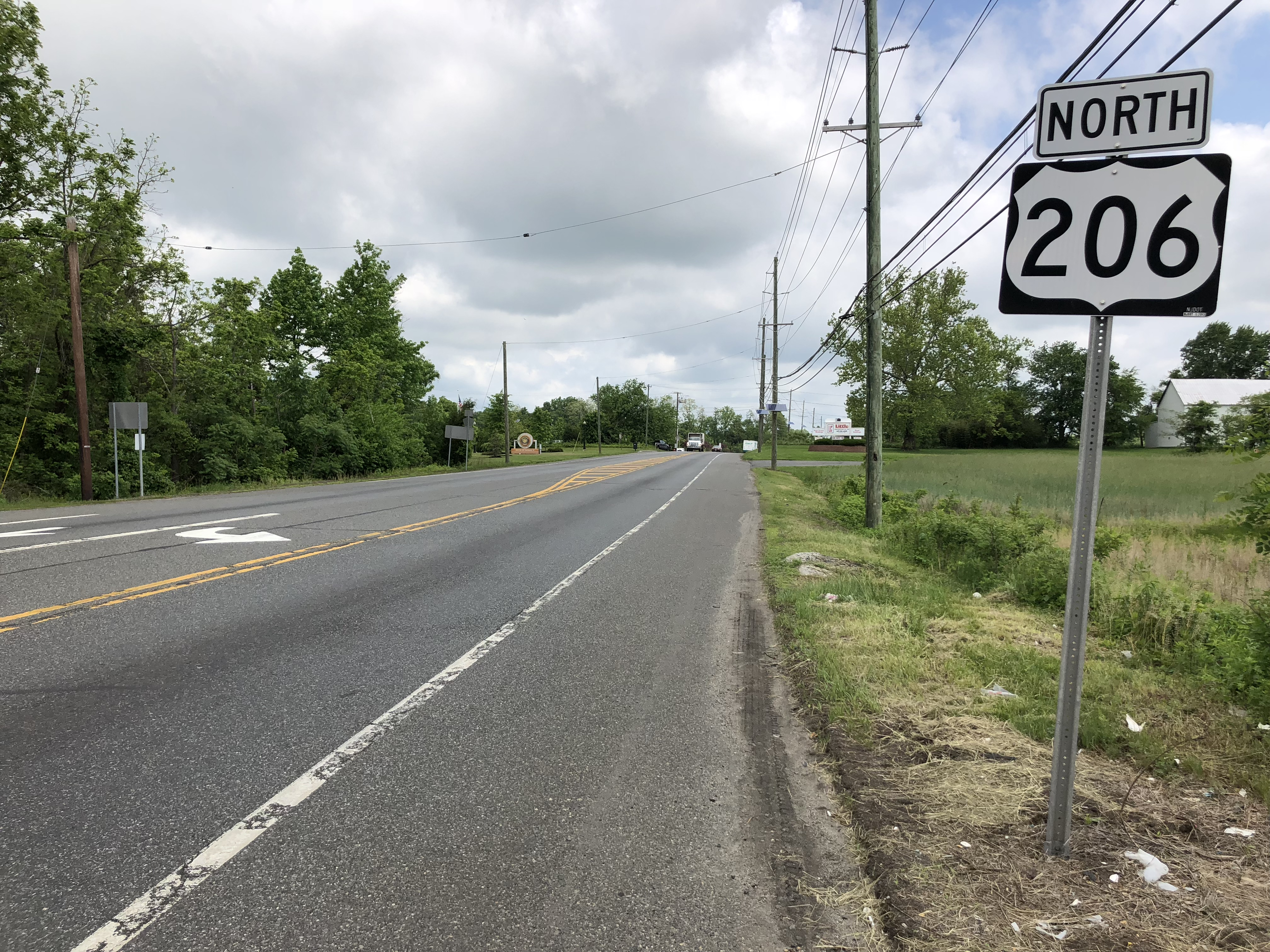
U.S. Route 206 on the western edge of Pemberton Township

=== Roads and highways ===
As of May 2010, the township had a total of 222.55 miles (358.16 km) of roadways, of which 168.39 miles (271.00 km) were maintained by the municipality, 47.41 miles (76.30 km) by Burlington County and 6.75 miles (10.86 km) by the New Jersey Department of Transportation.

The major roads that pass through are County Route 530, Route 70 in the south and U.S. Route 206 along the western border. Interstate 295 and the New Jersey Turnpike are outside in neighboring Springfield Township, but the closest interchanges are two towns away.

=== Public transportation ===
NJ Transit provides bus service in the township on the 317 route between Asbury Park and Philadelphia.

== Notable people ==
People who were born in, residents of, or otherwise closely associated with Pemberton Township include:

- Orlando Cáceres (born 1961), wrestler who competed for Puerto Rico in the men's freestyle 57 kg at the 1984 Summer Olympics
- Carmela Marie Cristiano (1928–2011), Catholic nun and social worker
- Matthew Emmons (born 1981), sharpshooter who won an Olympic gold medal at the 2004 Summer Olympics in the Men's 50 m Rifle Prone
- Ed Forchion (born 1964), cannabis activist known as NJWEEDMAN and a perennial candidate for various New Jersey elected offices
- George Franklin Fort (1809–1872), 16th Governor of New Jersey
- John Franklin Fort (1852–1920), 33rd Governor of New Jersey
- Ed Gillespie (born 1962), Chairman, US Republican National Committee (2003–2004), Presidential Advisor for George W. Bush (2007–2009)
- Ed Smith (born 1969), former NFL tight end
- Irv Smith (born 1971), former NFL player for the New Orleans Saints and the San Francisco 49ers, and brother of Ed Smith
- Elizabeth Coleman White (1871–1954), agriculturalist, developer of the first cultivated blueberry
