= Anthony Young (American football) =

American football player (born 1963)

No. 37
- Position: Safety

Personal information
- Born: October 8, 1963 (age 63); Columbia, South Carolina, U.S.
- Listed height: 5 ft 11 in (1.80 m)
- Listed weight: 187 lb (85 kg)

Career information
- High school: Pemberton Township (Pemberton Township, New Jersey)
- College: Temple
- NFL draft: 1985: 3rd round, 61st overall pick

Career history
- Indianapolis Colts (1985)

Awards and highlights
- Second-team All-American (1984); 2× First-team All-East (1982, 1984); Second-team All-East (1983)

Career NFL statistics
- Interceptions: 1
- Fumble recoveries: 4
- Touchdowns: 1
- Stats at Pro Football Reference

Anthony Ricardo Young (born October 8, 1963) is an American former professional football player who was a safety in the National Football League (NFL). The 5'11" and 187 pound defensive back was a third round selection by the Indianapolis Colts in the 1985 NFL draft out of Temple University. He would play in 14 games for the Colts (starting 12) in 1985 recording 1 interception and 1 fumble recovery returned for a touchdown. In 1986, Young was the Colts selection for the Ed Block Courage Award. In 2005, Anthony Young was inducted in the Temple University Athletic Hall of Fame.

Young retired after the 1986 season due to a neck injury.
