= Ed Smith (tight end) =

American baseball and football player (born 1969)

No. 86, 89, 45
- Position: Tight end

Personal information
- Born: June 5, 1969 (age 57); Trenton, New Jersey, U.S.
- Listed height: 6 ft 4 in (1.93 m)
- Listed weight: 253 lb (115 kg)

Career information
- High school: Pemberton Township (NJ)
- College: None

Career history
- Frankfurt Galaxy (1996); St. Louis Rams (1996)*; Washington Redskins (1996)*; Atlanta Falcons (1997–1998); Cleveland Browns (1999)*; Detroit Lions (1999)*; Philadelphia Eagles (1999); Detroit Lions (1999); Birmingham Thunderbolts (2001)
- * Offseason or practice squad member only
- Stats at Pro Football Reference

Edward Martin Smith (born June 5, 1969) is an American former football tight end who played in the National Football League (NFL) for the Atlanta Falcons, Philadelphia Eagles, and Detroit Lions from 1997 to 1999. Prior to that, Smith played baseball in the minor league systems of the Chicago White Sox, Milwaukee Brewers, Chicago Cubs, and Cleveland Indians. His nephew is Irv Smith Jr., tight end for the Kansas City Chiefs and his brother is Irv Smith, also a former NFL tight end.

== High school and baseball career ==
Smith grew up in the Browns Mills section of Pemberton Township, New Jersey and played football and baseball at Pemberton Township High School before being drafted by the White Sox in the 7th round of the 1987 MLB draft. He declined football scholarships to Penn State and Florida to begin his professional baseball career out of high school, and played in the White Sox minor league system from 1987 to 1991. He then played for the Brewers system from 1991 to 1993, the Cubs system in 1994, and the Indians system in 1995. His baseball career peaked at the Triple-A level in 1995 and ended following that season at age 26. Primarily a third baseman, Smith also played at first base and in the outfield later in his career.

== Football career ==
Smith then began a career in professional football, playing at tight end with the Frankfurt Galaxy of the NFL Europe in 1996. He was signed to the Washington Redskins practice squad as a free agent in August 1996 where he remained for the rest of the season. In 1997, he was signed to the Atlanta Falcons practice squad and was promoted to the team's active roster during the season. His first game in uniform was against a New Orleans Saints team that included his brother, Irv. The brothers would again be on opposing teams in 1998, with Irv playing for the San Francisco 49ers. Smith won an NFC championship with the Falcons in 1998. He split the 1999 NFL season between the Philadelphia Eagles and Detroit Lions, and his NFL career ended following that season. Smith then played for the Birmingham Thunderbolts of the XFL during the league's only season in 2001.

== Later life ==
The EZ Sports Talk Show debuted on the Phoenix, AZ air waves on June 4, 2011. Smith launched the show live on KXXT 1010AM in Phoenix. The show was also streamed live on 3 websites and available on podcast as well. The EZ Sports Talk Show aired for 2+ years on KXXT. During a brief hiatus, Smith maintained his presence as a radio personality in the Phoenix area and was also featured in some national spots. On March 4, 2017, EZ Sports Talk was relaunched on NBC Sports Radio KDUS, 1060AM. The show is broadcast live every Saturday from 10:00am – noon, hosted by Smith and his partner Jim Marshall.

The EZ Sports Talk Show format features a weekly in-depth look at the local sports landscape, in addition to national storylines and hot topics. Smith's background, with 9 years of minor league baseball and 6 years of professional football, has provided him with knowledge of the sports world. He is paired with Marshall's baseball knowledge and passion for Arizona sports.

Smith is also a motivational and inspirational speaker, with speaking engagements in both the U.S. and other countries. He aims to share insights and lessons with leaders, youth athletes, and business executives, drawing on his life experience and professional sports career to motivate attendees to achieve their goals for self-improvement.
