= Pemberton Heights, New Jersey =

Populated place in Burlington County, New Jersey, US

- Census-designated place
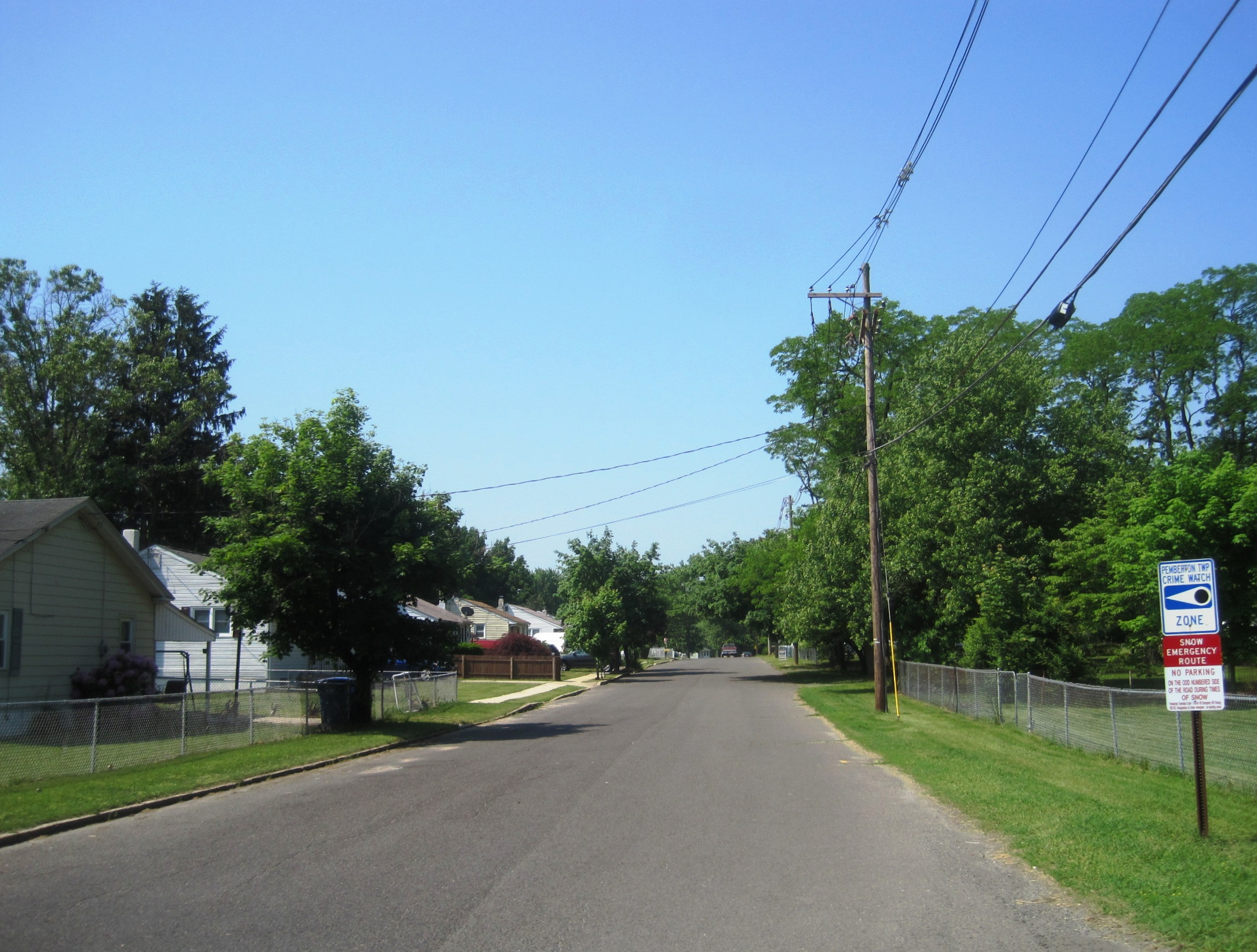
- Along Rottau Avenue

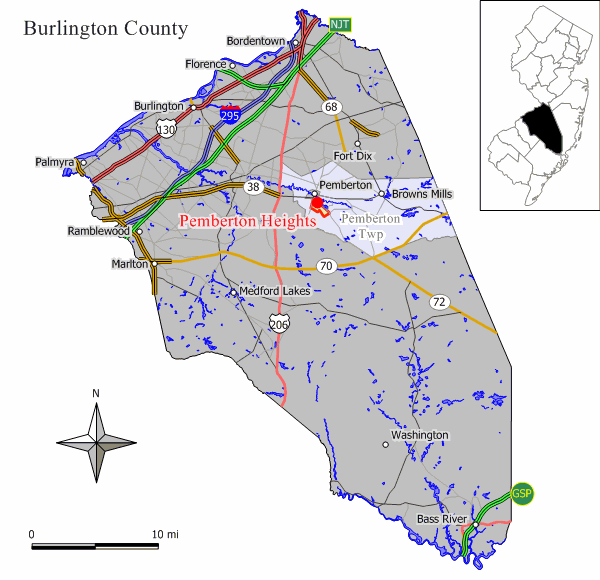
- Location of Pemberton Heights in Burlington County highlighted in red (left). Inset map: Location of Burlington County in New Jersey highlighted in black (right).

- Location in Burlington County Location in New Jersey Location in the United States
- Coordinates: 39.95792°N 74.674924°W
- Country: United States
- State: New Jersey
- County: Burlington
- Township: Pemberton

Area
  - Total: 0.97 sq mi (2.51 km^{2})
  - Land: 0.97 sq mi (2.51 km^{2})
  - Water: 0 sq mi (0.00 km^{2}) 0.05%
- Elevation: 59 ft (18 m)

Population (2020)
  - Total: 2,485
  - Density: 2,566.4/sq mi (990.91/km^{2})
- Time zone: UTC−05:00 (Eastern (EST))
  - Summer (DST): UTC−04:00 (Eastern (EDT))
- FIPS code: 34-57540
- GNIS feature ID: 02389655

Pemberton Heights is an unincorporated community and census-designated place (CDP) located within Pemberton Township, in Burlington County, in the U.S. state of New Jersey. As of the 2020 census, Pemberton Heights had a population of 2,485.

== Geography ==
According to the United States Census Bureau, the CDP had a total area of 0.937 square miles (2.43 km^{2}), including 0.937 square miles (2.43 km^{2}) of land and 0.000 square miles (0 km^{2}) of water (0.05%).

== Demographics ==
Historical population
Census	Pop.	Note	%±
1980	3,150		—
1990	2,941		−6.6%
2000	2,512		−14.6%
2010	2,423		−3.5%
2020	2,485		2.6%
Population sources: 1950 1960 1970; 1980 1990 2000; 2010 2020

Pemberton Heights first appeared as a census designated place in the 1980 U.S. census.

=== Racial and ethnic composition ===
Pemberton Heights CDP, New Jersey – Racial and ethnic composition Note: the US Census treats Hispanic/Latino as an ethnic category. This table excludes Latinos from the racial categories and assigns them to a separate category. Hispanics/Latinos may be of any race.
Race / Ethnicity (NH = Non-Hispanic)	Pop 2000	Pop 2010	Pop 2020	% 2000	% 2010	% 2020
White alone (NH)	916	935	896	36.46%	38.59%	36.06%
Black or African American alone (NH)	1,123	892	872	44.71%	36.81%	35.09%
Native American or Alaska Native alone (NH)	3	4	8	0.12%	0.17%	0.32%
Asian alone (NH)	96	83	90	3.82%	3.43%	3.62%
Native Hawaiian or Pacific Islander alone (NH)	0	1	2	0.00%	0.04%	0.08%
Other race alone (NH)	12	9	16	0.48%	0.37%	0.64%
Mixed race or Multiracial (NH)	71	110	173	2.83%	4.54%	6.96%
Hispanic or Latino (any race)	291	389	428	11.58%	16.05%	17.22%
Total	2,512	2,423	2,485	100.00%	100.00%	100.00%

=== 2020 census ===
As of the 2020 census, Pemberton Heights had a population of 2,485. The median age was 40.4 years. 19.0% of residents were under the age of 18 and 17.3% of residents were 65 years of age or older. For every 100 females there were 95.7 males, and for every 100 females age 18 and over there were 95.5 males age 18 and over.

95.6% of residents lived in urban areas, while 4.4% lived in rural areas.

There were 1,089 households in Pemberton Heights, of which 24.3% had children under the age of 18 living in them. Of all households, 33.2% were married-couple households, 28.7% were households with a male householder and no spouse or partner present, and 32.3% were households with a female householder and no spouse or partner present. About 37.6% of all households were made up of individuals and 11.0% had someone living alone who was 65 years of age or older.

There were 1,179 housing units, of which 7.6% were vacant. The homeowner vacancy rate was 1.3% and the rental vacancy rate was 10.6%.

=== 2010 census ===
The 2010 United States census counted 2,423 people, 1,028 households, and 588 families in the CDP. The population density was 2,586.8 people per square mile (998.8 people/km^{2}). There were 1,116 housing units at an average density of 1,191.4 units per square mile (460.0 units/km^{2}). The racial makeup was 44.99% (1,090) White, 39.25% (951) Black or African American, 0.17% (4) Native American, 3.63% (88) Asian, 0.04% (1) Pacific Islander, 6.23% (151) from other races, and 5.70% (138) from two or more races. Hispanic or Latino of any race were 16.05% (389) of the population.

Of the 1,028 households, 20.2% had children under the age of 18; 37.5% were married couples living together; 14.1% had a female householder with no husband present and 42.8% were non-families. Of all households, 37.1% were made up of individuals and 10.4% had someone living alone who was 65 years of age or older. The average household size was 2.36 and the average family size was 3.13.

19.2% of the population were under the age of 18, 10.7% from 18 to 24, 27.2% from 25 to 44, 25.2% from 45 to 64, and 17.6% who were 65 years of age or older. The median age was 39.0 years. For every 100 females, the population had 100.2 males. For every 100 females ages 18 and older there were 99.3 males.

=== 2000 census ===
As of the 2000 United States census there were 2,512 people, 1,072 households, and 633 families living in the CDP. The population density was 1,042.9 people/km^{2} (2,701 people/mi^{2}). There were 1,098 housing units at an average density of 455.8 units/km^{2} (1,181 units/mi^{2}). The racial makeup of the CDP was 41.80% White, 46.38% African American, 0.12% Native American, 3.82% Asian, 0.00% Pacific Islander, 4.10% from other races, and 3.78% from two or more races. 11.58% of the population were Hispanic or Latino of any race.

There were 1,072 households, out of which 19.0% had children under the age of 18 living with them, 42.9% were married couples living together, 12.2% had a female householder with no husband present, and 40.9% were non-families. 33.7% of all households were made up of individuals, and 5.8% had someone living alone who was 65 years of age or older. The average household size was 2.34 and the average family size was 3.05.

In the CDP the population was spread out, with 18.8% under the age of 18, 10.0% from 18 to 24, 30.8% from 25 to 44, 25.8% from 45 to 64, and 14.6% who were 65 years of age or older. The median age was 38 years. For every 100 females, there were 100.5 males. For every 100 females age 18 and over, there were 97.2 males.

The median income for a household in the CDP was $43,274, and the median income for a family was $60,536. Males had a median income of $32,319 versus $26,853 for females. The per capita income for the CDP was $24,716. 6.6% of the population and 3.8% of families were below the poverty line. 9.6% of those under the age of 18 and 3.4% of those 65 and older were living below the poverty line.

== Education ==
Its school district is Pemberton Township School District.
