= Orlando Cáceres =

Puerto Rican wrestler

Personal information
- Nationality: Puerto Rican
- Born: 27 October 1961 (age 64) Puerto Rico

Sport
- Sport: Wrestling

Orlando Cáceres (born 27 October 1961) is a Puerto Rican wrestler. He competed in the men's freestyle 57 kg at the 1984 Summer Olympics. A year earlier, he placed third at the Pan American Games in 1983 at 126 pounds (57 kg).

Cáceres was born in Puerto Rico, while his father was serving with the United States Air Force and was stationed at Ramey Air Force Base in Aguadilla. Raised in Newark, New Jersey, he moved with his family to the Browns Mills section of Pemberton Township, New Jersey, while he was in middle school, when his father was reassigned to McGuire Air Force Base. When he enrolled at Pemberton Township High School, he chose wrestling because he wasn't big enough to compete in other sports, ultimately finishing with a record of 60–0 in his final two seasons. Cáceres was a two-time New Jersey high school state champion, at 115 pounds (52 kg) in 1979 and at 122 pounds (55 kg) 1980. He was rivals with wrestler Jeffrey Verity of Northern Burlington County Regional High School.

He wrestled for Trenton State College (since renamed as The College of New Jersey) and was part of the Puerto Rico team at the 1984 Summer Olympics in Los Angeles.
