= Comical Corner, New Jersey =

Populated place in Burlington County, New Jersey, US

- Unincorporated community
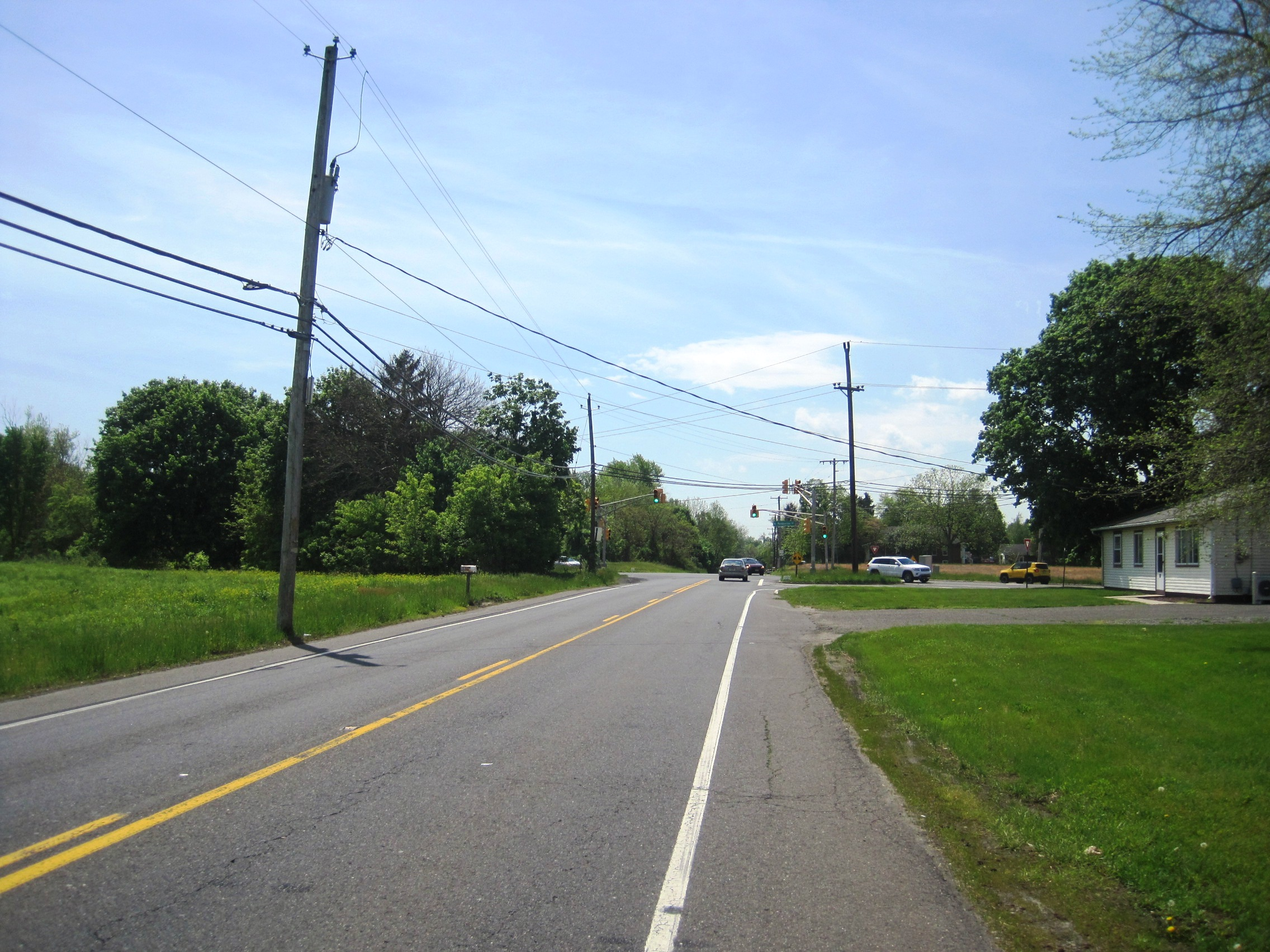
- Looking south along CR 668 towards CR 630

- Location of Comical Corner in Burlington County (Inset: Location of county within the state of New Jersey) Comical Corner (New Jersey) Comical Corner (the United States)
- Coordinates: 39°59′00″N 74°41′00″W
- Country: United States
- State: New Jersey
- County: Burlington
- Township: Pemberton
- Elevation: 69 ft (21 m)
- Time zone: UTC−05:00 (Eastern (EST))
  - Summer (DST): UTC−04:00 (EDT)
- GNIS feature ID: 875595

Comical Corner or Comical Corners is an unincorporated community located within Pemberton Township in Burlington County, in the U.S. state of New Jersey. The site of the actual corners is at the intersection of Pemberton Road (County Route 630) and Arneys Mount Road (CR 668). The original name may have been "Conical Corner" based on the cone-like shape of the skewed intersection but had turned to "Comical Corner" based on a mishearing.

While most historical maps of the area do support this hypothesis as to the origin of the community's name, such as a county map as early as 1849, one of the earliest maps of Burlington County does not. A map covering a portion of the county prepared in 1840 identifies the corner as Commical [sic] Corner just north of Pemberton, but the community, displayed as 4 houses at that time, was not an intersection but simply a bend in the road. The roads present on the 1840 map are today's North Pemberton Road heading west and Pemberton Arneys Mt Road heading south. This map only covers a portion of the county and it is possible the community was a true intersection in 1840, but other roads that extend off the map coverage area are drawn as such. This map presents an alternate possibility that it may have been "comical" because the "corner" was not an actual corner but just a kink in the road.

The area, located just to the north of Pemberton Borough, is mostly rural and is surrounded by farmland on the two obtuse sides of the intersection.
