= Woodland Township School District =

School district in Burlington County, New Jersey, US

Address
- 2 Giles Avenue Chatsworth, Burlington County, New Jersey, 08019; United States
- Coordinates: 39.815865°N 74.536181°W

District information
- Grades: Pre-K to 8
- Superintendent: Misty Weiss
- Business administrator: Laura Archer
- Schools: 1

Students and staff
- Enrollment: 109 (as of 2022–23)
- Faculty: 14.0 FTEs
- Student–teacher ratio: 7.8:1

Other information
- District Factor Group: DE
- Website: www.woodlandboe.org
Ind.	Per pupil	District spending	Rank (*)	K-8 average	%± vs. average
1A	Total Spending	$16,811	17	$18,891	−11.0%
1	Budgetary Cost	14,102	24	14,159	−0.4%
2	Classroom Instruction	9,028	32	8,659	4.3%
6	Support Services	1,234	1	2,167	−43.1%
8	Administrative Cost	1,762	46	1,547	13.9%
10	Operations & Maintenance	1,875	43	1,612	16.3%
13	Extracurricular Activities	40	15	104	−61.5%
16	Median Teacher Salary	47,000	3	61,136
Data from NJDoE 2014 Taxpayers' Guide to Education Spending. *Of K-8 districts with up to 400 students. Lowest spending=1; Highest=71

The Woodland Township School District is a community public school district that serves students in pre-kindergarten through eighth grade from Woodland Township, in Burlington County, in the U.S. state of New Jersey.

As of the 2022–23 school year, the district, comprised of one school, had an enrollment of 109 students and 14.0 classroom teachers (on an FTE basis), for a student–teacher ratio of 7.8:1. In the 2016–17 school year, Woodland had the 24th smallest enrollment of any school district in the state, with 147 students.

The district is classified by the New Jersey Department of Education as being in District Factor Group "DE", the fifth-highest of eight groupings. District Factor Groups organize districts statewide to allow comparison by common socioeconomic characteristics of the local districts. From lowest socioeconomic status to highest, the categories are A, B, CD, DE, FG, GH, I and J.

Public school students from Woodland Township in ninth through twelfth grades attend Seneca High School, located in Tabernacle Township, which also serves students from Shamong Township, Southampton Township and Tabernacle Townships. The school is part of the Lenape Regional High School District, which also serves students from Evesham Township, Medford Lakes, Medford Township and Mount Laurel Township at Shawnee High School. As of the 2020–21 school year, the high school had an enrollment of 1,073 students and 103.6 classroom teachers (on an FTE basis), for a student–teacher ratio of 10.4:1.

== History ==
After decades of failed attempts, legislation was signed into law in 1996 that would allow the Woodland Township School District to sever its sending/receiving relationship with the Pemberton Township School District and join the Lenape Regional High School District. Woodland Township had been sending about 30 students a year—and nearly $300,000 in tuition payments—to join the 1,350 students then at Pemberton Township High School as part of a relationship that dated back to the 1920s. For years, the Pemberton district had refused Woodland Township's repeated requests to terminate the relationship. In May 1997, the Lenape district agreed to start accepting students from Woodland Township at Lenape High School starting with the 1997-98 school year and to add Woodland Township as the regional district's eight constituent municipality.

== School ==
- Chatsworth Elementary School had an enrollment of 129 students in grades PreK-8 in the 2020–21 school year.

== Administration ==
Core members of the district's administration are:

- Misty Weiss, superintendent
- Laura Archer, business administrator and board secretary

== Board of education ==
The district's board of education, composed of five members, sets policy and oversees the fiscal and educational operation of the district through its administration. As a Type II school district, the board's trustees are elected directly by voters to serve three-year terms of office on a staggered basis, with either one or two seats up for election each year held (since 2012) as part of the November general election. The board appoints a superintendent to oversee the district's day-to-day operations and a business administrator to supervise the business functions of the district.
