= Presidential Lakes Estates, New Jersey =

Populated place in Burlington County, New Jersey, US

- Census-designated place
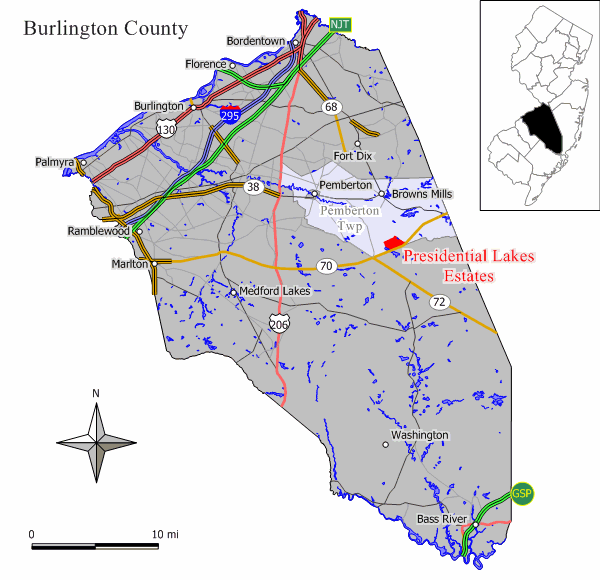
- Location of Presidential Lakes Estates in Burlington County highlighted in red (left). Inset map: Location of Burlington County in New Jersey highlighted in black (right).

- Location in Burlington County Location in New Jersey Location in the United States
- Coordinates: 39.914955°N 74.563509°W
- Country: United States
- State: New Jersey
- County: Burlington
- Township: Pemberton

Area
  - Total: 1.15 sq mi (2.97 km^{2})
  - Land: 1.12 sq mi (2.89 km^{2})
  - Water: 0.031 sq mi (0.08 km^{2}) 1.95%
- Elevation: 253 ft (77 m)

Population (2020)
  - Total: 2,353
  - Density: 2,106.9/sq mi (813.48/km^{2})
- Time zone: UTC−05:00 (Eastern (EST))
  - Summer (DST): UTC−04:00 (Eastern (EDT))
- FIPS code: 34-60840
- GNIS feature ID: 02389705

Presidential Lakes Estates is an unincorporated community and census-designated place (CDP) located within Pemberton Township, in Burlington County, in the U.S. state of New Jersey. As of the 2020 census, Presidential Lakes Estates had a population of 2,353.

== Geography ==
According to the United States Census Bureau, the CDP had a total area of 1.084 square miles (2.81 km^{2}), including 1.063 square miles (2.75 km^{2}) of land and 0.021 square miles (0.054 km^{2}) of water (1.95%).

== Demographics ==
Historical population
Census	Pop.	Note	%±
1980	2,607		—
1990	2,450		−6.0%
2000	2,332		−4.8%
2010	2,365		1.4%
2020	2,353		−0.5%
Population sources: 1950 1960 1970; 1980 1990 2000; 2010 2020

Presidential Lakes Estates first appeared as a census designated place in the 1980 U.S. census.

=== Racial and ethnic composition ===
Presidential Lakes Estates CDP, New Jersey – Racial and ethnic composition Note: the US Census treats Hispanic/Latino as an ethnic category. This table excludes Latinos from the racial categories and assigns them to a separate category. Hispanics/Latinos may be of any race.
Race / ethnicity (NH = Non-Hispanic)	Pop 2000	Pop 2010	Pop 2020	% 2000	% 2010	% 2020
White alone (NH)	1,773	1,719	1,643	76.03%	72.68%	69.83%
Black or African American alone (NH)	271	286	221	11.62%	12.09%	9.39%
Native American or Alaska Native alone (NH)	8	4	8	0.34%	0.17%	0.34%
Asian alone (NH)	51	55	45	2.19%	2.33%	1.91%
Native Hawaiian or Pacific Islander alone (NH)	2	3	4	0.09%	0.13%	0.17%
Other race alone (NH)	5	5	18	0.21%	0.21%	0.76%
Mixed race or Multiracial (NH)	69	76	172	2.96%	3.21%	7.31%
Hispanic or Latino (any race)	153	217	242	6.56%	9.18%	10.28%
Total	2,332	2,365	2,353	100.00%	100.00%	100.00%

=== 2020 census ===
As of the 2020 census, Presidential Lakes Estates had a population of 2,353. The median age was 40.3 years. 21.6% of residents were under the age of 18 and 16.6% were 65 years of age or older. For every 100 females, there were 104.6 males, and for every 100 females age 18 and over, there were 105.9 males age 18 and over.

0.0% of residents lived in urban areas, while 100.0% lived in rural areas.

There were 830 households, of which 32.7% had children under the age of 18 living in them. Of all households, 59.0% were married-couple households, 14.1% were households with a male householder and no spouse or partner present, and 20.4% were households with a female householder and no spouse or partner present. About 19.8% of all households were made up of individuals, and 8.3% had someone living alone who was 65 years of age or older.

There were 874 housing units, of which 5.0% were vacant. The homeowner vacancy rate was 0.9%, and the rental vacancy rate was 15.0%.

=== 2010 census ===
The 2010 United States census counted 2,365 people, 772 households, and 642 families in the CDP. The population density was 2,223.8 people per square mile (858.6 people/km^{2}). There were 819 housing units at an average density of 770.1 units per square mile (297.3 units/km^{2}). The racial makeup was 78.14% (1,848) White, 13.11% (310) Black or African American, 0.25% (6) Native American, 2.41% (57) Asian, 0.13% (3) Pacific Islander, 1.56% (37) from other races, and 4.40% (104) from two or more races. Hispanic or Latino of any race were 9.18% (217) of the population.

Of the 772 households, 35.9% had children under the age of 18; 63.1% were married couples living together; 12.3% had a female householder with no husband present and 16.8% were non-families. Of all households, 12.7% were made up of individuals and 3.1% had someone living alone who was 65 years of age or older. The average household size was 3.06 and the average family size was 3.28.

24.9% of the population were under the age of 18, 8.7% from 18 to 24, 30.0% from 25 to 44, 28.4% from 45 to 64, and 8.0% who were 65 years of age or older. The median age was 36.5 years. For every 100 females, the population had 102.0 males. For every 100 females ages 18 and older there were 104.0 males.

=== 2000 census ===
As of the 2000 United States census there were 2,332 people, 740 households, and 629 families living in the CDP. The population density was 865.8 people/km^{2} (2,242 people/mi^{2}). There were 774 housing units at an average density of 287.3 units/km^{2} (744 units/mi^{2}). The racial makeup of the CDP was 79.03% White, 12.14% African American, 0.34% Native American, 2.27% Asian, 0.09% Pacific Islander, 1.76% from other races, and 4.37% from two or more races. Hispanic or Latino of any race were 6.56% of the population.

There were 740 households, out of which 45.0% had children under the age of 18 living with them, 69.2% were married couples living together, 10.1% had a female householder with no husband present, and 14.9% were non-families. 9.9% of all households were made up of individuals, and 2.2% had someone living alone who was 65 years of age or older. The average household size was 3.15 and the average family size was 3.35.

In the CDP the population was spread out, with 28.9% under the age of 18, 8.7% from 18 to 24, 32.5% from 25 to 44, 24.2% from 45 to 64, and 5.7% who were 65 years of age or older. The median age was 34 years. For every 100 females, there were 105.5 males. For every 100 females age 18 and over, there were 99.9 males.

The median income for a household in the CDP was $68,276, and the median income for a family was $68,311. Males had a median income of $43,241 versus $28,947 for females. The per capita income for the CDP was $22,995. None of the families and 2.5% of the population were living below the poverty line, including no under eighteens and 14.9% of those over 64.

== Education ==
Its school district is Pemberton Township School District.
