= Lenape Regional High School District =

School district in Burlington County, New Jersey, US

Address
- 93 Willow Grove Road Shamong Township, Burlington County, New Jersey, 08088; United States
- Coordinates: 39.7917°N 74.7539°W

District information
- Grades: 9-12
- Superintendent: Matthew D. Webb
- Business administrator: Kara L. Huber
- Schools: 4

Students and staff
- Enrollment: 6,535 (as of 2024–25)
- Faculty: 521.5 FTEs
- Student–teacher ratio: 12.5:1

Other information
- District Factor Group: GH
- Website: www.lrhsd.org
Ind.	Per pupil	District spending	Rank (*)	9-12 average	%± vs. average
1A	Total Spending	$21,878	30	$18,891	15.8%
1	Budgetary Cost	16,942	34	15,592	8.7%
2	Classroom Instruction	9,881	41	8,807	12.2%
6	Support Services	2,384	25	2,294	3.9%
8	Administrative Cost	1,453	12	1,592	−8.7%
10	Operations & Maintenance	2,172	34	1,954	11.2%
13	Extracurricular Activities	982	31	873	12.5%
16	Median Teacher Salary	75,164	37	71,726
Data from NJDoE 2014 Taxpayers' Guide to Education Spending. *Of 9-12 districts with any number of students. Lowest spending=1; Highest=47

The Lenape Regional High School District (LRHSD) is a comprehensive regional public high school district that serves students in ninth through twelfth grades from eight municipalities in Burlington County, in the U.S. state of New Jersey. The communities in the district are Evesham Township, Medford Lakes, Medford, Mount Laurel, Shamong Township, Southampton Township, Tabernacle Township and Woodland Township. The eight municipalities cover a combined area of 350 square miles (910 km^{2}) which represents roughly one-third of the entire area of Burlington County, the largest county in New Jersey. Each of the eight communities served by the Lenape District has its own elementary school district for pre-kindergarten / kindergarten through eighth grade, which is governed by its own independent board of education which oversees the school budget and the education of students.

As of the 2024–25 school year, the district, comprised of four schools, had an enrollment of 6,535 students and 521.5 classroom teachers (on an FTE basis), for a student–teacher ratio of 12.5:1.

== History ==
The regional district was formed after 93% of voters approved the passage of a referendum in September 1955 by residents of the original seven constituent municipalities—Evesham, Medford, Mount Laurel, Shamong, Southampton and Tabernacle Townships, along with Medford Lakes—to cover the cost of a $2 million (equivalent to $24 million in 2025) facility that would serve 1,000 students. Delaware Township (since renamed as Cherry Hill), Maple Shade Township and Woodland Township townships had considered—and turned down—the opportunity to join the nascent regional district.

A plot covering 50 acres (20 ha) in Medford was selected in June 1956 as a site for the district's first high school facility. Lenape High School opened in September 1958 with 548 students in 9th and 10th grades only, before which students from Medford, Medford Lakes and Tabernacle Township had attended Rancocas Valley Regional High School. By the 1961–62 school year, Lenape was on double sessions with approximately 1,500 students. In July 1961, an addition to the original building was started, with a second addition dedicated on January 17, 1965.

A second high school, announced in 1968 with an estimated cost of $3.5 million (equivalent to $32.4 million in 2025), was designed to accommodate a student body of 1,500 and include 26 classrooms, a gym, cafeteria, and a 600-seat auditorium. Shawnee High School opened in 1970 as the second of the district's four high schools.

With overcrowding at both Lenape (with 2,400 students) and Shawnee (1,600) high schools requiring split sessions, voters approved a December 1972 referendum to construct a third high school that would have a capacity of 1,500 students and be constructed on the same model as Shawnee. The ballot item was approved by a 55-45% margin, with voters in favor in Evesham, Medford and Mount Laurel Townships, while it was rejected in Medford Lakes and Shamong, Southampton and Tabernacle Townships. Cherokee High School opened in September 1975 with 750 students in grades 9 and 10, by which time district enrollment had grown to nearly 5,000. The school was constructed at a cost of $7 million (equivalent to $41.9 million in 2025) on a site in Evesham Township covering 71 acres (29 ha).

In 1996, legislation introduced by State Senator C. William Haines and signed into law by Governor of New Jersey Christine Todd Whitman would allow the Woodland Township School District to sever its sending/receiving relationship with the Pemberton Township School District and join the Lenape Regional District; Pemberton would not be required to give permission for Woodland Township to leave, but Lenape Regional would have to agree to accept the township's students. Woodland Township had been sending about 30 students a year—and nearly $300,000 in tuition payments—to attend the 1,350-student Pemberton Township High School as part of a relationship that dated back to the 1920s. For years, the Pemberton district had refused Woodland Township's repeated requests to terminate the relationship. In May 1997, the Lenape district agreed to start accepting students from Woodland Township at Lenape High School starting with the 1997–98 school year and to add Woodland Township as the regional district's eight constituent municipality.

A 210,000 square feet (20,000 m^{2}) Cherokee High School South "school-within-a-school" opened in September 2001 for 1,150 students in grades 9-10, which was constructed at a cost of $26.4 million (equivalent to $48 million in 2025), at which time the original building was renamed as Cherokee High School North. In 2018, with the retirement of the South principal, Leonard Iannelli, Cherokee eliminated the position, effectively merging the North and South buildings into a single combined school.

Approved by voters in 1997, the 255,000-square-foot (23,700 m^{2}) Seneca High School was expected to be completed by 2000, to be constructed on a 201-acre (81 ha) site designed to accommodate an enrollment of 2,000. The school opened in September 2007 with 860 students from Shamong, Southampton, Tabernacle and Woodland Townships and was completed at a cost of $45.7 million (equivalent to $71 million in 2025). Delays caused by lawsuits related to the building site in the Pinelands resulted in budget overruns of $8.7 million.

The district had been classified by the New Jersey Department of Education as being in District Factor Group "GH", the third-highest of eight groupings. District Factor Groups organize districts statewide to allow comparison by common socioeconomic characteristics of the local districts. From lowest socioeconomic status to highest, the categories are A, B, CD, DE, FG, GH, I and J.

== Schools ==
When the public school students in each of the sending districts graduate from eighth grade, they are sent to one of the four high schools that fall under the jurisdiction of the Lenape Regional High School District. Schools in the district (with 2023–24 enrollment data from the National Center for Education Statistics) are:

High schools

- Cherokee High School - located in Evesham Township, with 2,081 students from Evesham Township. Opened 1975.
  - Donna Charlesworth, principal
- Lenape High School - located in Medford Township, with 1,912 students from Mount Laurel Township. Opened 1958.
  - Tony Cattani, principal
- Seneca High School - located in Tabernacle Township, with 1,058 students from Shamong, Southampton, Tabernacle and Woodland Townships. Opened 2003.
  - David New, principal
- Shawnee High School - located in Medford Township, with 1,387 students from Medford Lakes and Medford Township. Opened 1970.
  - Matthew Campbell, principal

Alternative program

- Sequoia Alternative Program - located in Evesham Township in the former Florence V. Evans Elementary School
  - Ben Lamberson, Director/Principal

Two non-profit foundations support the Lenape District, raising funds to support scholarships for students, facilities improvements and a 1,500-seat regional performing arts center, which is home to the Cherokee's theater program.

== Administration ==
Core members of the district's administration are:

- Matthew D. Webb, superintendent
- Kara L. Huber, business administrator and board secretary

== Board of education ==
The district's board of education, comprised of 11 members, sets policy and oversees the fiscal and educational operation of the district through its administration. As a Type II school district, the board's trustees are elected directly by voters to serve three-year terms of office on a staggered basis, with either three or four seats up for election each year held (since 2012) as part of the November general election. The board appoints a superintendent to oversee the district's day-to-day operations and a business administrator to supervise the business functions of the district. Each of the eight constituent municipalities has at least one seat on the board, with two seats allocated to the three most populous constituent municipalities—Evesham, Medford and Mount Laurel—and the five other municipalities each assigned one seat.

== Student body ==
In 1996, the percentage of students who matriculated to community colleges or four-year universities for all schools was at least 80% per school.
