= Pemberton Township High School =

High school in Burlington County, New Jersey, US

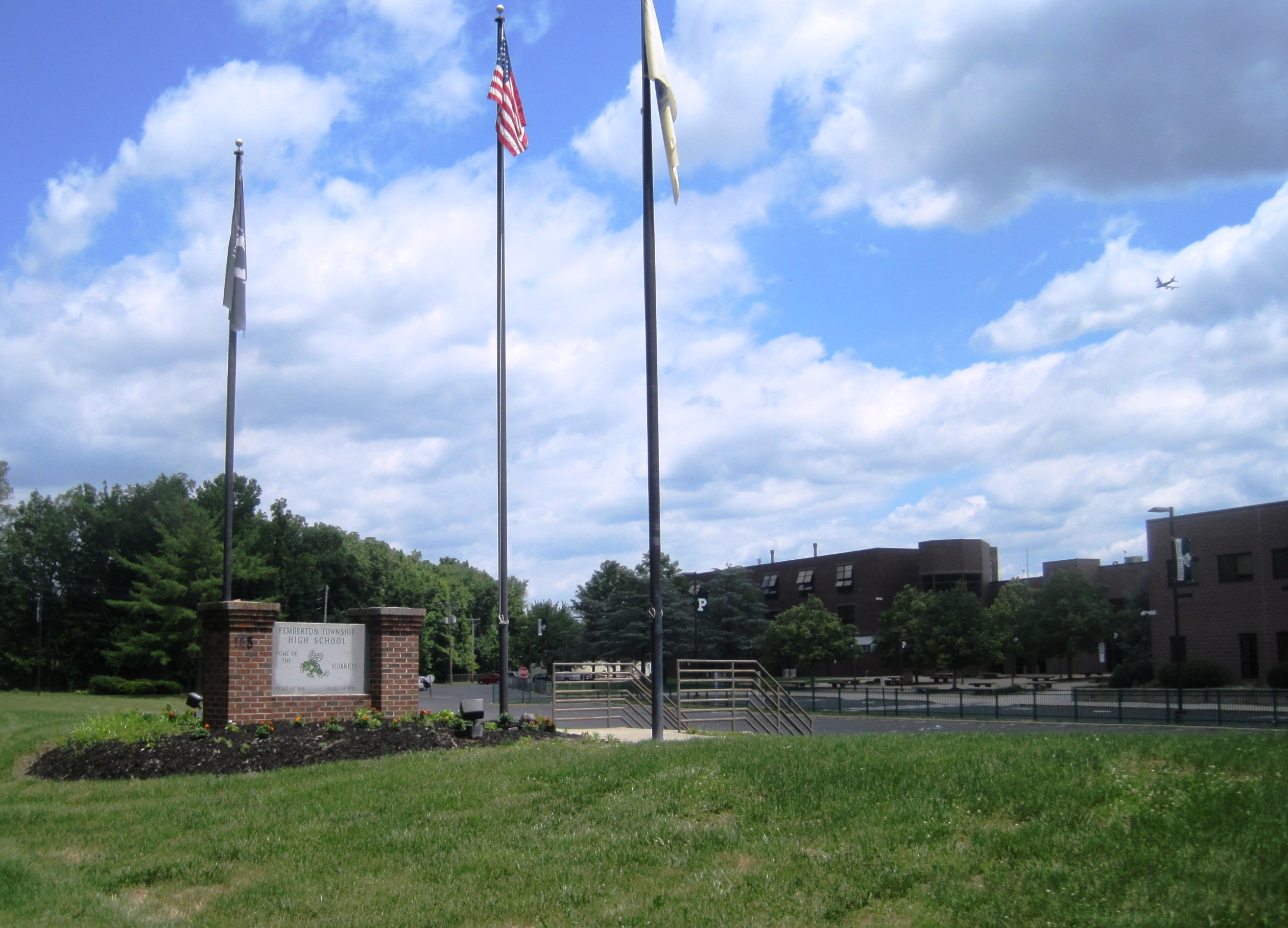

Location
- 148 Arney's Mount Road; Pemberton Township, Burlington County, New Jersey 08068; United States; 39.9896°N 74.6862°W

Information
- Type: Public high school
- Motto: (PTHS) Peace-Truth-Honor-Spirit
- Established: 1935
- School district: Pemberton Township School District
- NCES School ID: 341281001202
- Principal: Darvis Holley
- Faculty: 73.0 FTEs
- Grades: 9-12
- Enrollment: 972 (as of 2024–25)
- Student to teacher ratio: 13.3:1
- Colors: Green and white
- Athletics conference: Burlington County Scholastic League (general); West Jersey Football League (football)
- Team name: Hornets
- Accreditation: Middle States Association of Colleges and Schools
- Website: pths.pemberton.k12.nj.us

Pemberton Township High School is a four-year comprehensive public high school that serves students in ninth through twelfth grade from Pemberton Township, in Burlington County, in the U.S. state of New Jersey, operating as the lone secondary school of the Pemberton Township School District. The school has been accredited by the Middle States Association of Colleges and Schools Commission on Elementary and Secondary Schools since 2012 as part of the first district in the state to receive accreditation for all of its schools.

As of the 2024–25 school year, the school had an enrollment of 972 students and 73.0 classroom teachers (on an FTE basis), for a student–teacher ratio of 13.3:1. There were 345 students (35.5% of enrollment) eligible for free lunch and 132 (13.6% of students) eligible for reduced-cost lunch.

== History ==
A united high school for grades nine through twelve opened at the Arney's Mount Road site in 1990; the high school was previously split with grades 9 and 10 attending Pemberton High School No. 1 on Fort Dix Road (now the Helen A. Fort Middle School) and grades 11 and 12 attending school at the building then known as Pemberton High School No. 2.

In 1996, legislation signed into law would allow the Woodland Township School District to sever its sending/receiving relationship with the Pemberton Township School District and join the Lenape Regional High School District. Woodland Township had been sending about 30 students a year—and nearly $300,000 in tuition payments—to join the 1,350 students at Pemberton Township High School as part of a relationship that dated back to the 1920s. For years, the Pemberton district had refused Woodland Township's repeated requests to terminate the relationship. In May 1997, the Lenape district agreed to start accepting students from Woodland Township at Lenape High School starting with the 1997–98 school year and to add Woodland Township as the regional district's eight constituent municipality. In 1996, the school's enrollment was 1,350. At the time the percentage of students who matriculated to community colleges or four-year universities was 55%.

In 1999, as part of its efforts to discourage students from smoking, the Pemberton Township Council established fines for students caught smoking in school bathrooms, with fines assessed at $100 for a first offense and $200 for each additional incident.

In 2014 the Thomas Jefferson Center for the Protection of Free Expression "awarded" Pemberton Principal Ida Smith a "Muzzle" for censoring student publications.

== Attendance area ==
It is one of the two high schools which takes in high-school aged dependent students living-on post in these portions of Joint Base McGuire-Dix-Lakehurst: McGuire Air Force Base and Fort Dix.

== Awards, recognition, and rankings ==
The school was the 293rd-ranked public high school in New Jersey out of 339 schools statewide in New Jersey Monthly magazine's September 2014 cover story on the state's "Top Public High Schools," using a new ranking methodology. The school had been ranked 195th in the state of 328 schools in 2012, after being ranked 266th in 2010 out of 322 schools listed. The magazine ranked the school 257th in 2008 out of 316 schools. The school was ranked 277th in the magazine's September 2006 issue, which surveyed 316 schools across the state.

Schooldigger.com ranked the school as tied for 309th out of 376 public high schools statewide in its 2010 rankings (a decrease of 14 positions from the 2009 rank) which were based on the combined percentage of students classified as proficient or above proficient on the language arts literacy and mathematics components of the High School Proficiency Assessment (HSPA).

Pemberton Township High School won first place in the New Jersey High School Consumer Bowl Burlington County competition, held at the Palmyra Cove Nature Park and Environmental Center in Palmyra as part of the 10th annual New Jersey High School Consumer Bowl. PTHS has won the statewide competition in 2000, 2003 and 2004.

Pemberton Township High School Choral Music Department students have successfully auditioned into the National Association for Music Education All National Honors Mixed Chorus, New Jersey Music Educators Association All State Mixed Chorus and All State Women's Chorus as well South Jersey Choral Directors Association (SJCDA) Region III District Chorus.

== Athletics ==
The Pemberton Township High School Hornets compete in the Burlington County Scholastic League, which is comprised of public and private high schools in Burlington, Mercer and Ocean counties in central New Jersey, operating under the jurisdiction of the New Jersey State Interscholastic Athletic Association (NJSIAA). With 752 students in grades 10–12, the school was classified by the NJSIAA for the 2019–20 school year as Group II for most athletic competition purposes, which included schools with an enrollment of 486 to 758 students in that grade range. The football team competes in the Freedom Division of the 94-team West Jersey Football League superconference and was classified by the NJSIAA as Group III South for football for 2024–2026, which included schools with 695 to 882 students. The school colors are dark green and white, and the school's mascot is the hornet.

The football program has enjoyed the school's most success with several winning seasons and a state championship under the guidance of former head coach William McDowell. The current head coach is John Rosnick. Parade All-Americans include Octavius Gould who went on to play for the Florida Gators and Irv Smith who went on to play for Notre Dame. The 1977 football team finished the season with a record of 8–2–1 after winning the NJSIAA South Jersey Group IV state sectional title with a 9–6 win against Rancocas Valley Regional High School in the championship game.

The boys' wrestling team won the South Jersey Group IV state championship in 1980. Orlando Cáceres won two state individual titles, at 115 pounds (52 kg) in 1979 and at 122 pounds (55 kg) 1980

== Administration ==
The school's principal is Darvis Holley. His core administration team includes three assistant principals.

== Notable alumni ==
- Orlando Cáceres (born 1961), wrestler who competed for Puerto Rico in the men's freestyle 57 kg at the 1984 Summer Olympics
- Jerry Dunn (born 1953), college basketball coach who has been head coach of the Tuskegee Golden Tigers
- Matthew Emmons (born 1981), Olympic gold medal winner at the 2004 Summer Olympics in the Men's 50 m Rifle Prone
- Ed Gillespie (born 1962), former chairman of the Republican National Committee, where he served from July 2003 to January 2005
- Chris Hall (born 1970), NFL player for the Dallas cowboys
- Chelcie Ross (born 1942, class of 1960), character actor
- Ed Smith (born 1969), former NFL tight end for the Atlanta Falcons, Philadelphia Eagles, and Detroit Lions
- Irv Smith (born 1971), tight end who played most of his NFL career with the New Orleans Saints
- Johnnie Troutman (born 1987), offensive lineman who has played for the San Diego Chargers
- Anthony Young (born 1963), American football safety who played in the NFL for the Indianapolis Colts
