= Birmingham, New Jersey =

Populated place in Burlington County, New Jersey, US

- Unincorporated community
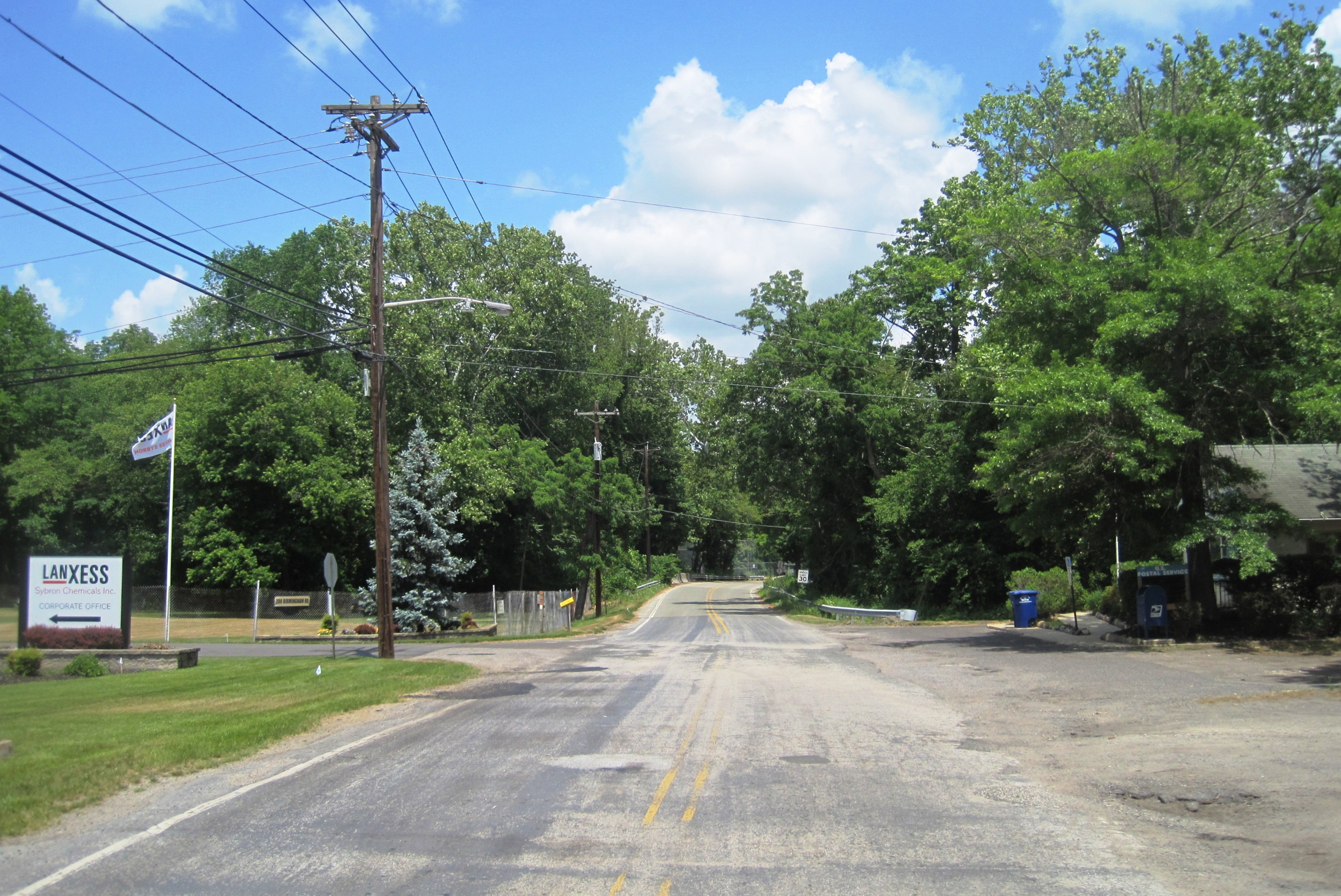
- Birmingham at its post office

- Location of Birmingham in Burlington County (Inset: Location of county within the state of New Jersey) Birmingham (New Jersey) Birmingham (the United States)
- Coordinates: 39°58′33″N 74°42′37″W
- Country: United States
- State: New Jersey
- County: Burlington
- Township: Pemberton
- Elevation: 33 ft (10 m)

Population (2010 census)
  - Total: 33
- Time zone: UTC−05:00 (Eastern (EST))
  - Summer (DST): UTC−04:00 (EDT)
- ZIP Code: 08011
- Area code: 609
- GNIS feature ID: 874772

Birmingham is an unincorporated community located within Pemberton Township in Burlington County, in the U.S. state of New Jersey. As of the 2010 United States census, the ZIP Code Tabulation Area for ZIP Code 08011 had a population of 33. Though sparsely populated, it houses a post office and a Lanxess chemical facility.

== Transportation ==
New Jersey Transit provides service to and from Philadelphia on the 317 route which can be accessed from County Route 530 which runs to the south of Birmingham.

== Climate ==
The climate in this area is characterized by hot, humid summers and generally mild to cool winters. According to the Köppen Climate Classification system, Birmingham has a humid subtropical climate, abbreviated "Cfa" on climate maps.
