= Pemberton Township School District =

School district in Burlington County, New Jersey, US

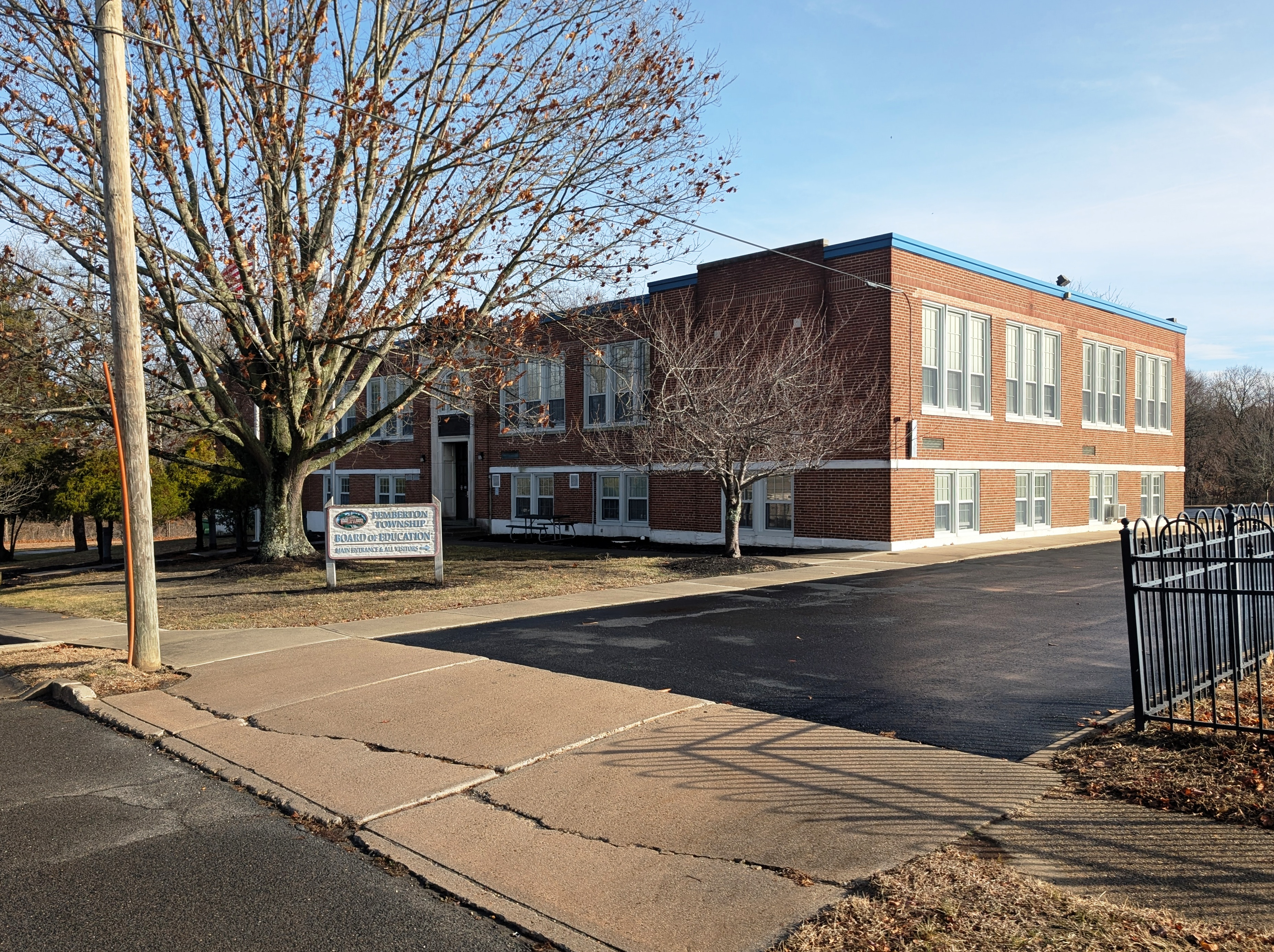
- District offices

Address
- One Egbert Street Pemberton, Burlington County, New Jersey, 08068; United States
- Coordinates: 39.974615°N 74.679487°W

District information
- Grades: Pre-K to 12
- Superintendent: Jeff Havers
- Business administrator: Pasquale Yacovelli
- Schools: 9
- Affiliation: Former Abbott district

Students and staff
- Enrollment: 4,443 (as of 2021–22)
- Faculty: NA
- Student–teacher ratio: NA

Other information
- District Factor Group: B
- Website: www.pemberton.k12.nj.us
Ind.	Per pupil	District spending	Rank (*)	K-12 average	%± vs. average
1A	Total Spending	$23,459	96	$18,891	24.2%
1	Budgetary Cost	19,035	100	14,783	28.8%
2	Classroom Instruction	11,240	100	8,763	28.3%
6	Support Services	3,662	102	2,392	53.1%
8	Administrative Cost	1,637	81	1,485	10.2%
10	Operations & Maintenance	2,046	86	1,783	14.8%
13	Extracurricular Activities	219	40	268	−18.3%
16	Median Teacher Salary	82,041	98	64,043
Data from NJDoE 2014 Taxpayers' Guide to Education Spending. *Of K-12 districts with more than 3,500 students. Lowest spending=1; Highest=103

Pemberton Township School District is a comprehensive community public school district headquartered in Pemberton Township, in the U.S. state of New Jersey, serving students in pre-kindergarten through twelfth grade. The district is one of 31 former Abbott districts statewide that were established pursuant to the decision by the New Jersey Supreme Court in Abbott v. Burke which are now referred to as "SDA Districts" based on the requirement for the state to cover all costs for school building and renovation projects in these districts under the supervision of the New Jersey Schools Development Authority. The school district serves Pemberton Township (including the communities of Browns Mills, Country Lake Estates, Pemberton Heights and Presidential Lakes Estates and the Pemberton Township portion of Fort Dix) along with Pemberton Borough.

As of the 2021–22 school year, the district, comprised of nine schools, had an enrollment of 4,443 students.

The district participates in the Interdistrict Public School Choice Program, which allows non-resident students to attend the district's school without cost to their parents, with tuition covered by the State of New Jersey. Available slots are announced annually by grade.

== History ==
Previously the district had two high school buildings, and in 1989 had plans to expand space at High School No. 2. High School No. 1 had been used for grades 9 and 10, while High School No. 2 served students in 11th and 12th grades. Planned reductions in civilian staffing at Fort Dix and McGuire Air Force Base were expected to result in a drop of 3 million in the federal contribution to the district's $35&million budget

In 1991 the district began reducing access to interviewing students who were living on-post at Fort Dix and students of other Fort Dix families, stating that military parents wanted such access reduced.

In 1996, legislation signed into law would allow the Woodland Township School District to sever its sending/receiving relationship with the Pemberton Township School District and join the Lenape Regional High School District. Woodland Township had been sending about 30 students a year—and nearly $300,000 in tuition payments—to join the 1,350 students at Pemberton Township High School as part of a relationship that dated back to the 1920s. For years, the Pemberton district had refused Woodland Township's repeated requests to terminate the relationship. In May 1997, the Lenape district agreed to start accepting students from Woodland Township at Lenape High School starting with the 1997-98 school year and to add Woodland Township as the regional district's eight constituent municipality.

In 1997, the district had almost 7,000 students, with about 700 living on Fort Dix. That year there were plans to shift the Fort Dix students to North Hanover schools. Pemberton school officials were against that move.

The district had been classified by the New Jersey Department of Education as being in District Factor Group "B", the second lowest of eight groupings. District Factor Groups organize districts statewide to allow comparison by common socioeconomic characteristics of the local districts. From lowest socioeconomic status to highest, the categories are A, B, CD, DE, FG, GH, I and J.

== Operations ==
In 1987, the U.S. military directly payid the school district for education of students, since the district cannot collect property-based school taxes from the military bases themselves.

== Attendance area ==
It is the singular school district for most of the township, except portions on Joint Base McGuire-Dix-Lakehurst, which is listed by the United States Census Bureau as having its own school district. Students on portions of the joint base attend area school district public schools, as the Department of Defense Education Activity (DoDEA) does not operate any schools on that base. Students on-post in the McGuire and Dix areas (McGuire Air Force Base and Fort Dix) may attend one of the following in their grade levels, with all siblings in a family taking the same choice: Pemberton Township District, North Hanover Township School District, and Northern Burlington County Regional School District.

== Awards and recognition ==
Pemberton High School was awarded AP District Honor Roll for simultaneously achieving increases in access to Advanced Placement courses for a broader number of students and also maintaining or improved rate at which the school's AP students earned scores of 3 or higher on an AP Exam.

In the 2016–2017 school year, Helen Fort Newcomb Middle School, Howard Emmons School and Alexander Denbo School were recognized as State Schools of Character by the New Jersey Alliance for Social, Emotional, and Character Development.

In the 2017–2018 school year, Samuel Busansky, Fort Dix, Harker-Wylie and Joseph Stackhouse elementary schools, along with Pemberton Early Childhood Education Center were recognized as State Schools of Character by the New Jersey Alliance for Social, Emotional, and Character Development.

== Student body ==
In 1988 23% of the students in the Pemberton district were from military families.

== Schools ==
Schools in the district (with 2021–22 enrollment data from the National Center for Education Statistics) are:

Preschool

- Pemberton Early Childhood Education Center (with 416 students; PreK)
  - Deborah Ceplo, principal

Elementary schools

- Samuel T. Busansky Elementary School (281; 3–5)
  - Maureen DiBella, assistant director; Norman Adams, principal
- Denbo-Crichton Elementary School (850; K–5)
  - Brett Thorp, principal
- Howard L. Emmons Elementary School (293; K-2)
  - John Schmidt, principal
- Fort Dix Elementary School (317; PreK-5)
  - Darvis Holley, principal
- Joseph S. Stackhouse Elementary School (223; K-2)
  - Robin Blue, principal

Middle schools

- Marcus Newcomb Middle School (307; 6)
  - Ashley Walulak, principal
- Helen A. Fort Middle School (661; 7–8)
  - Aaron Eyler, principal

High school

- Pemberton Township High School (1,029; 9–12)
  - Jermaine Blount, principal

== Administration ==
Core members of the district's administration are:

- Jeff Havers, superintendent,
- Pasquale Yacovelli, school business administrator and board secretary

== Board of education ==
The district's board of education, comprised of nine members, sets policy and oversees the fiscal and educational operation of the district through its administration. As a Type II school district, the board's trustees are elected directly by voters to serve three-year terms of office on a staggered basis, with three seats up for election each year held (since 2012) as part of the November general election. The board appoints a superintendent to oversee the district's day-to-day operations and a business administrator to supervise the business functions of the district.
