= New Lisbon, New Jersey =

Populated place in Burlington County, New Jersey, US

- Unincorporated community
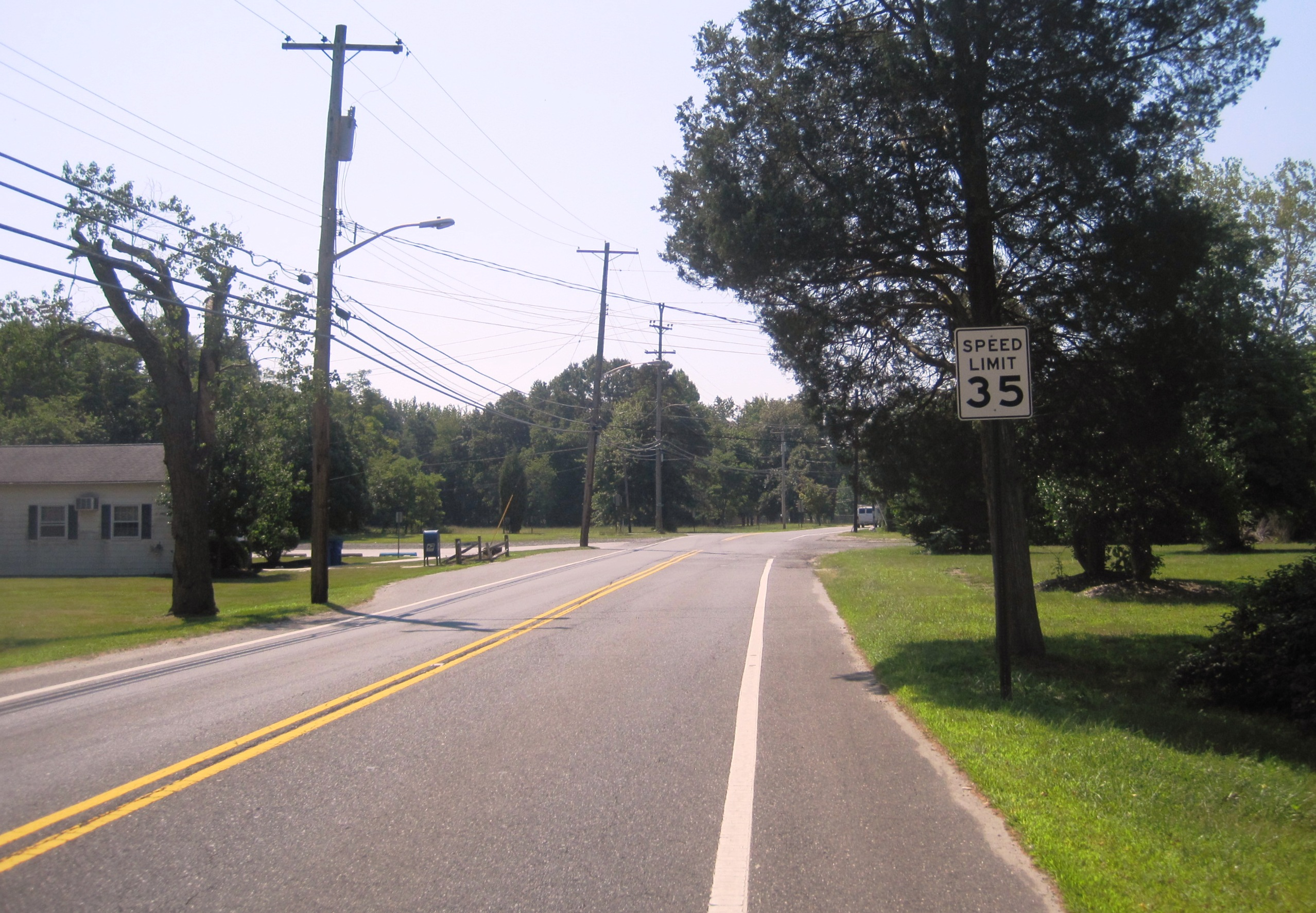
- Center of New Lisbon along Four Mile Road (CR 646)

- Location in Burlington County (Inset: Burlington County in New Jersey) New Lisbon (New Jersey) New Lisbon (the United States)
- Coordinates: 39°57′29″N 74°37′41″W
- Country: United States
- State: New Jersey
- County: Burlington
- Township: Pemberton
- Elevation: 43 ft (13 m)
- Time zone: UTC−05:00 (Eastern (EST))
  - Summer (DST): UTC−04:00 (Eastern (EDT))
- ZIP Code: 08064
- GNIS feature ID: 878745

New Lisbon is an unincorporated community located within Pemberton Township in Burlington County, in the U.S. state of New Jersey. It is a settlement along Four Mile Road (County Route 646) where it intersects Mount Misery Road (CR 645). The community is located along the Philadelphia and Long Branch Railway, later a part of the Pennsylvania Railroad, and featured a train station.

== New Lisbon Developmental Center ==
The New Lisbon Developmental Center (NLDC) is a healthcare facility for male and female developmentally disabled persons, located on a 1,896-acre (767 ha) tract of land in New Lisbon, on Route 72 in the New Jersey Pine Barrens. The facilities include several residential living units, a health services center, recreational facilities, an eatery, maintenance buildings and a thrift store. The center is located five miles (8.0 km) to the southeast of the center of the community.

== Transportation ==
New Jersey Transit provides bus service to and from Philadelphia on the 317 route via CR 530 which runs east and west about one mile (1.6 km) to the north of New Lisbon.
