= Irv Smith Sr. =

American football player (born 1971)

Irv Smith
No. 82
- Position: Tight end

Personal information
- Born: October 13, 1971 (age 55); Trenton, New Jersey, U.S.
- Listed height: 6 ft 3 in (1.91 m)
- Listed weight: 262 lb (119 kg)

Career information
- High school: Pemberton Township (NJ)
- College: Notre Dame
- NFL draft: 1993: 1st round, 20th overall pick

Career history
- New Orleans Saints (1993–1997); San Francisco 49ers (1998); Cleveland Browns (1999); Washington Redskins (2000)*
- * Offseason or practice squad member only

Career NFL statistics
- Receptions: 183
- Receiving yards: 1,788
- Receiving TDs: 15
- Stats at Pro Football Reference

Irvin Martin Smith Sr. (born October 13, 1971) is an American former professional football player who was a tight end in the National Football League (NFL). He was selected by the New Orleans Saints in the first round (20th overall) of the 1993 NFL draft.

== Football career ==
Pre-draft measurables
Height	Weight	Arm length	Hand span	40-yard dash	10-yard split	20-yard split	20-yard shuttle	Vertical jump	Broad jump	Bench press
6 ft 3 1/8 in (1.91 m)	255 lb (116 kg)	33 3/8 in (0.85 m)	9 1/2 in (0.24 m)	4.81 s	1.66 s	2.82 s	4.46 s	31.5 in (0.80 m)	9 ft 10 in (3.00 m)	16 reps
All values from NFL Combine

A 6 ft 3 in (1.91 m), 262 lb (119 kg) tight end, he went on to star at the University of Notre Dame. Smith played in the NFL from 1993 to 1999.

Smith co-hosts "EZ Sports Talk" with his older brother, former Atlanta Falcons tight end Ed "EZ" Smith, in Phoenix, Arizona. His son, Irv Smith Jr., played college football as a tight end at the University of Alabama and is a member of the NFL's Kansas City Chiefs.

== NFL career statistics ==
Year	Team	GP	Receiving						Fumbles	
Year	Team	GP	Rec	Yds	Avg	Lng	TD	FD	Fum	Lost
1993	NO	16	16	180	11.3	23	2	12	1	1
1994	NO	16	41	330	8.0	19	3	17	0	0
1995	NO	16	45	466	10.4	43	3	24	1	1
1996	NO	7	15	144	9.6	37	0	6	0	0
1997	NO	11	17	180	10.6	25	1	8	1	1
1998	SF	16	25	266	10.6	25	5	17	0	0
1999	CLE	13	24	222	9.3	22	1	13	0	0
Career		95	183	1,788	9.8	43	15	97	3	3
