= Country Lake Estates, New Jersey =

Populated place in Burlington County, New Jersey, US

- Census-designated place
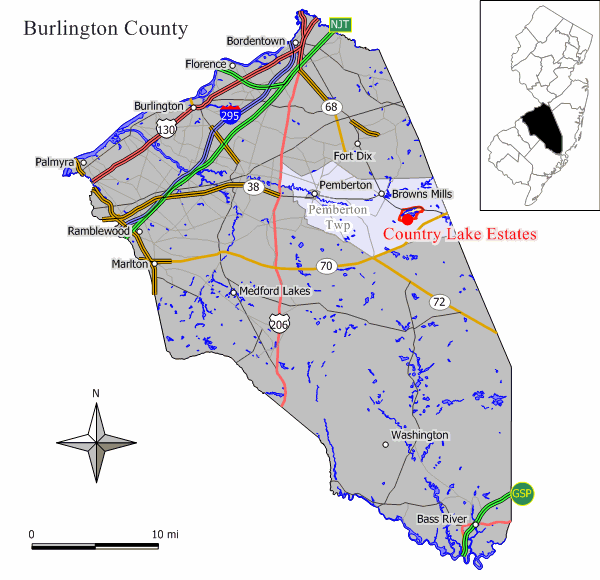
- Map of Country Lake Estates CDP in Burlington County. Inset: Location of Burlington County in New Jersey.

- Location in Burlington County Location in New Jersey Location in the United States
- Coordinates: 39.948988°N 74.537929°W
- Country: United States
- State: New Jersey
- County: Burlington
- Township: Pemberton

Area
  - Total: 1.40 sq mi (3.63 km^{2})
  - Land: 1.14 sq mi (2.95 km^{2})
  - Water: 0.26 sq mi (0.68 km^{2}) 19.43%
- Elevation: 72 ft (22 m)

Population (2020)
  - Total: 4,054
  - Density: 3,559/sq mi (1,374.3/km^{2})
- Time zone: UTC−05:00 (Eastern (EST))
  - Summer (DST): UTC−04:00 (Eastern (EDT))
- FIPS code: 34-15250
- GNIS feature ID: 02389364

Country Lake Estates is an unincorporated community and census-designated place (CDP) located within Pemberton Township, in Burlington, in the U.S. state of New Jersey. As of the 2020 census, Country Lake Estates had a population of 4,054.

== Geography ==
According to the United States Census Bureau, the CDP had a total area of 1.360 square miles (3.52 km^{2}), including 1.096 square miles (2.84 km^{2}) of land and 0.264 square miles (0.68 km^{2}) of water (19.43%).

== Demographics ==
Historical population
Census	Pop.	Note	%±
1980	3,739		—
1990	4,492		20.1%
2000	4,012		−10.7%
2010	3,943		−1.7%
2020	4,054		2.8%
Population sources: 1950 1960 1970; 1980 1990 2000; 2010 2020

Country Lake Estates first appeared as a census designated place in the 1980 U.S. census.

=== Racial and ethnic composition ===
Country Lake Estates CDP, New Jersey – Racial and ethnic composition Note: the US Census treats Hispanic/Latino as an ethnic category. This table excludes Latinos from the racial categories and assigns them to a separate category. Hispanics/Latinos may be of any race.
Race / Ethnicity (NH = Non-Hispanic)	Pop 2000	Pop 2010	Pop 2020	% 2000	% 2010	% 2020
White alone (NH)	2,605	2,535	2,407	64.93%	64.29%	59.37%
Black or African American alone (NH)	778	665	585	19.39%	16.87%	14.43%
Native American or Alaska Native alone (NH)	11	7	2	0.27%	0.18%	0.05%
Asian alone (NH)	110	113	113	2.74%	2.87%	2.79%
Native Hawaiian or Pacific Islander alone (NH)	2	4	1	0.05%	0.10%	0.02%
Other race alone (NH)	22	9	29	0.55%	0.23%	0.72%
Mixed race or Multiracial (NH)	130	153	372	3.24%	3.88%	9.18%
Hispanic or Latino (any race)	354	457	545	8.82%	11.59%	13.44%
Total	4,012	3,943	4,054	100.00%	100.00%	100.00%

=== 2020 census ===
As of the 2020 census, Country Lake Estates had a population of 4,054. The median age was 40.1 years. 22.0% of residents were under the age of 18 and 15.9% of residents were 65 years of age or older. For every 100 females there were 94.4 males, and for every 100 females age 18 and over there were 92.6 males age 18 and over.

99.5% of residents lived in urban areas, while 0.5% lived in rural areas.

There were 1,458 households in Country Lake Estates, of which 31.1% had children under the age of 18 living in them. Of all households, 48.6% were married-couple households, 17.8% were households with a male householder and no spouse or partner present, and 24.3% were households with a female householder and no spouse or partner present. About 20.5% of all households were made up of individuals and 9.6% had someone living alone who was 65 years of age or older.

There were 1,552 housing units, of which 6.1% were vacant. The homeowner vacancy rate was 3.9% and the rental vacancy rate was 6.9%.

=== 2010 census ===
The 2010 United States census counted 3,943 people, 1,392 households, and 1,055 families in the CDP. The population density was 3,596.3 people per square mile (1,388.5 people/km^{2}). There were 1,482 housing units at an average density of 1,351.7 units per square mile (521.9 units/km^{2}). The racial makeup was 70.40% (2,776) White, 18.34% (723) Black or African American, 0.20% (8) Native American, 2.99% (118) Asian, 0.10% (4) Pacific Islander, 2.79% (110) from other races, and 5.17% (204) from two or more races. Hispanic or Latino of any race were 11.59% (457) of the population.

Of the 1,392 households, 30.5% had children under the age of 18; 56.5% were married couples living together; 14.9% had a female householder with no husband present and 24.2% were non-families. Of all households, 19.0% were made up of individuals and 7.2% had someone living alone who was 65 years of age or older. The average household size was 2.83 and the average family size was 3.24.

24.6% of the population were under the age of 18, 8.5% from 18 to 24, 26.3% from 25 to 44, 29.7% from 45 to 64, and 10.9% who were 65 years of age or older. The median age was 38.2 years. For every 100 females, the population had 94.5 males. For every 100 females ages 18 and older there were 93.6 males.

=== 2000 census ===
As of the 2000 United States census there were 4,012 people, 1,349 households, and 1,080 families living in the CDP. The population density was 1,395.5 people/km^{2} (3,614 people/mi^{2}). There were 1,419 housing units at an average density of 493.6 units/km^{2} (1,278 units/mi^{2}). The racial makeup of the CDP was 70.14% White, 20.26% African American, 0.30% Native American, 2.82% Asian, 0.05% Pacific Islander, 2.39% from other races, and 4.04% from two or more races. Hispanic or Latino of any race were 8.82% of the population.

There were 1,349 households, out of which 39.2% had children under the age of 18 living with them, 58.1% were married couples living together, 16.8% had a female householder with no husband present, and 19.9% were non-families. 15.6% of all households were made up of individuals, and 4.1% had someone living alone who was 65 years of age or older. The average household size was 2.97 and the average family size was 3.28.

In the CDP the population was spread out, with 28.4% under the age of 18, 8.9% from 18 to 24, 30.4% from 25 to 44, 25.0% from 45 to 64, and 7.3% who were 65 years of age or older. The median age was 35 years. For every 100 females, there were 99.7 males. For every 100 females age 18 and over, there were 95.5 males.

The median income for a household in the CDP was $58,859, and the median income for a family was $63,791. Males had a median income of $40,558 versus $27,956 for females. The per capita income for the CDP was $20,554. About 4.4% of families and 5.5% of the population were below the poverty line, including 9.0% of those under age 18 and 5.9% of those age 65 or over.

== Education ==
Its school district is Pemberton Township School District.
