= Deborah Heart and Lung Center =

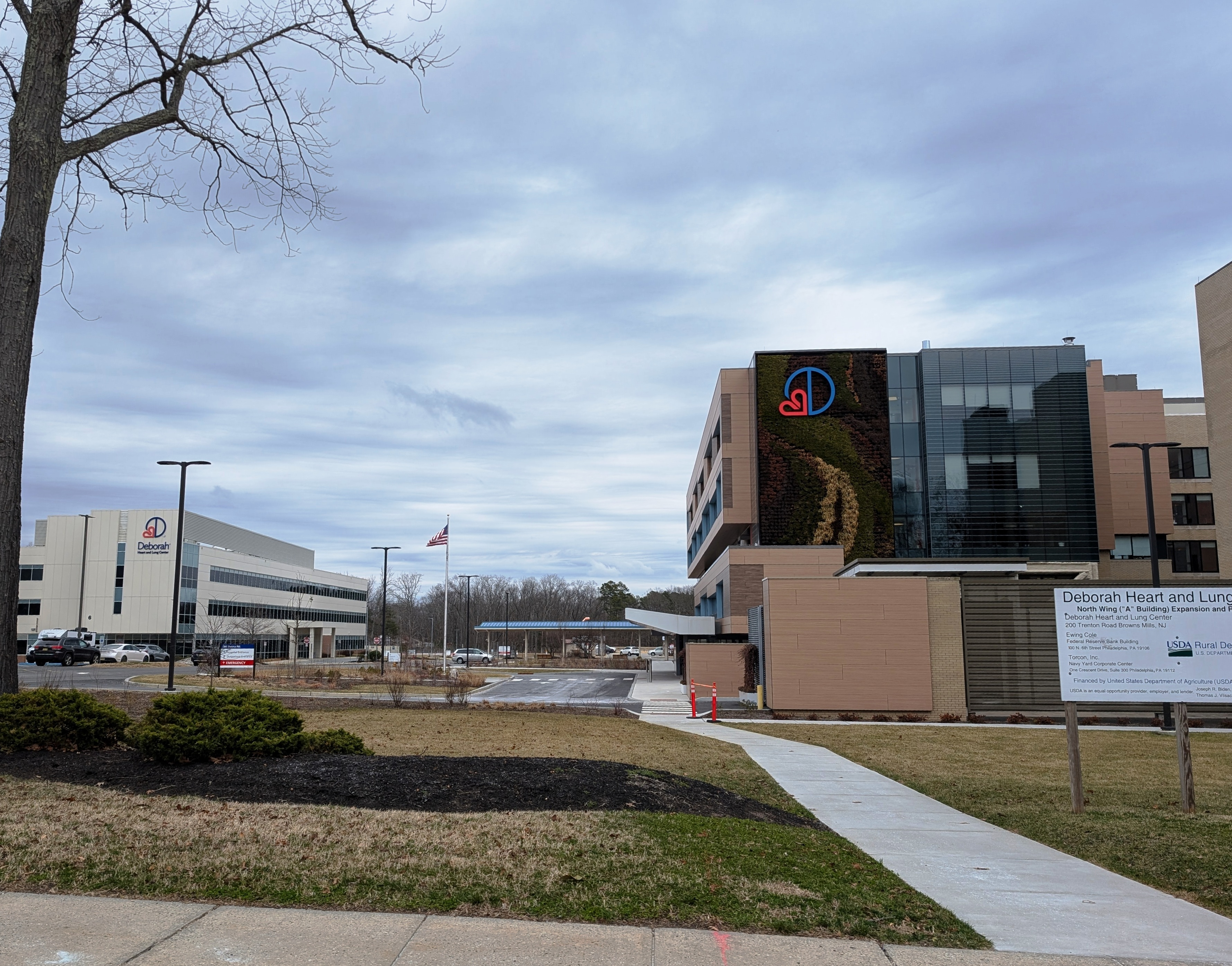
- Main campus in Browns Mills

Geography
- Location: Browns Mills, Burlington County, New Jersey, United States
- Coordinates: 39.9775°N 74.5850°W

Organization
- Type: Specialist

Services
- Beds: 94
- Speciality: cardiac, vascular, and lung disease

History
- Opened: 1922

Links
- Website: demanddeborah.org
- Lists: Hospitals in New Jersey

Deborah Heart and Lung Center is located in Browns Mills, Burlington County, New Jersey, United States. It is the only hospital in the Philadelphia metropolitan area that focuses exclusively on cardiac, vascular, and lung disease.

Deborah Heart and Lung Center has 94 beds with a full-service ambulatory care center. In March 2010, Deborah Heart and Lung Center opened an emergency department, currently operated by Capital Health of Burlington County. The emergency department offers ambulances and walk-in patients access to emergency care.

== History ==
Dora Moness Shapiro established Deborah in 1922 as a tuberculosis sanitorium to provide care for those who could not afford it. Her motto was "There is no price tag on life!" Legend has it that Deborah's rural Burlington County location was the key to recovery because of its therapeutic Jersey Pine Barrens air. In reality, thousands of tuberculosis patients were medically treated by Deborah physicians.

In 1934, a woman named Clara Franks became a tuberculosis patient at Deborah. She was cured the next year. Following her discharge, she began to work for Deborah as a secretary and fundraising assistant. She began organizing community-based chapters to support Deborah, laying the foundation for the Deborah Hospital Foundation of today.

In the late 1940s, with the development of antibiotics that could arrest tuberculosis, Deborah began to shift emphasis to treating heart diseases. On July 28, 1958, pioneering heart surgeon Dr. Charles Bailey performed Deborah's first on-site heart surgery on three-year-old Bill DiMartino, followed by Dora Hansen, age 36.

In 1959, Deborah made an official name change to Deborah Hospital. In 1973, Deborah Hospital made another official name change to Deborah Heart and Lung Center, which remains today.

== Deborah Hospital Foundation ==
Founded in 1974, Deborah Hospital Foundation is the fundraising arm of Deborah Heart and Lung Center.

== Services offered ==
- Clinical Interventional Cardiology
- Outpatient Pediatric Cardiology
- Electromechanical Therapy Institute
- Pulmonary Medicine
- Institute for Sleep Medicine
- Balance Center
- Vascular and Endovascular Medicine
- Vein Center
- Thoracic and Cardiothoracic Surgery
