= Browns Mills, New Jersey =

Census-designated place in Burlington County, New Jersey, US

- Census-designated place
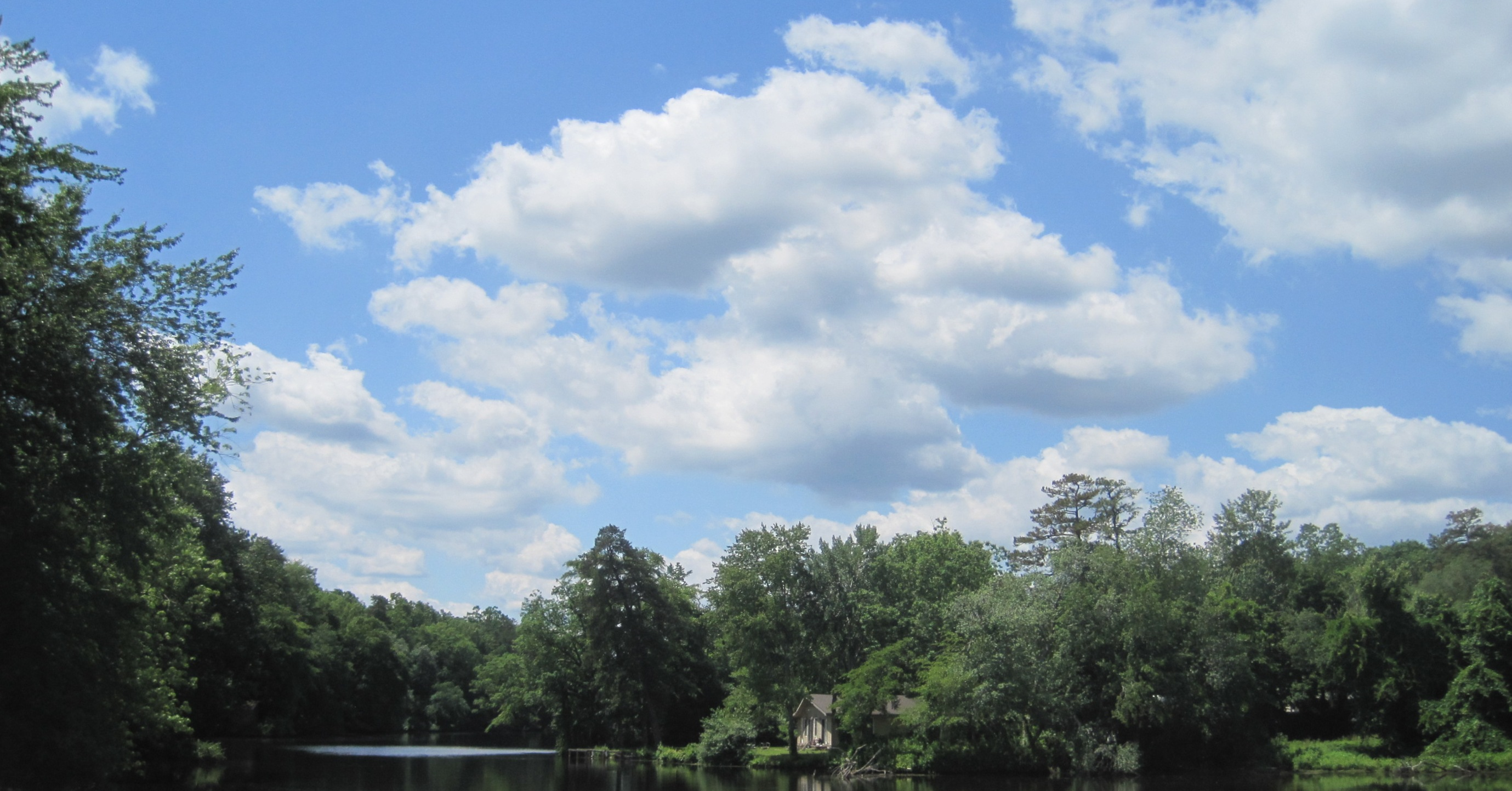
- Big Pine Lake in Browns Mills

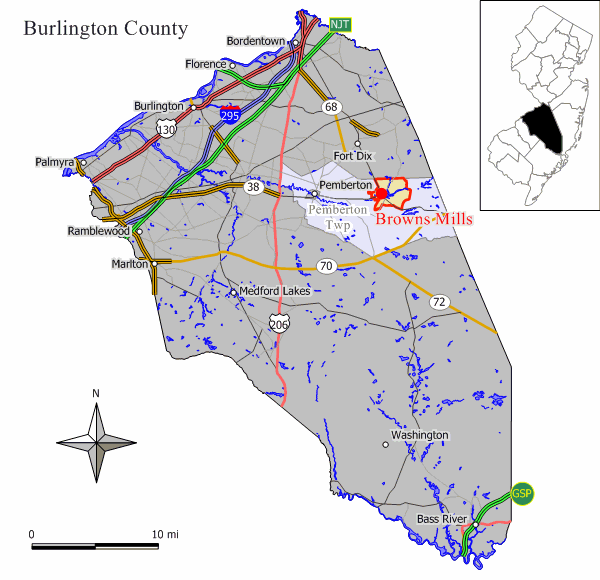
- Map of Browns Mills CDP in Burlington County. Inset: Location of Burlington County in New Jersey.

- Location in Burlington County Location in New Jersey Location in the United States
- Coordinates: 39°58′22″N 74°35′0″W
- Country: United States
- State: New Jersey
- County: Burlington
- Township: Pemberton

Area
  - Total: 5.62 sq mi (14.55 km^{2})
  - Land: 5.37 sq mi (13.92 km^{2})
  - Water: 0.24 sq mi (0.63 km^{2}) 4.36%
- Elevation: 66 ft (20 m)

Population (2020)
  - Total: 10,734
  - Density: 1,997.8/sq mi (771.4/km^{2})
- Time zone: UTC−05:00 (Eastern (EST))
  - Summer (DST): UTC−04:00 (Eastern (EDT))
- ZIP Code: 08015
- Area code: 609
- FIPS code: 34-08455
- GNIS feature ID: 2389252

Browns Mills is an unincorporated community and census-designated place (CDP) located in Pemberton Township, in Burlington County, in the U.S. state of New Jersey. As of the 2020 United States census the CDP's population was 10,734, a decrease of 489 (-4.4%) from the 11,223 counted at the 2010 United States census, which in turn reflected a decrease of 34 (-0.3%) from the 2000 census. Browns Mills is known as the home of Deborah Heart and Lung Center.

== Geography ==
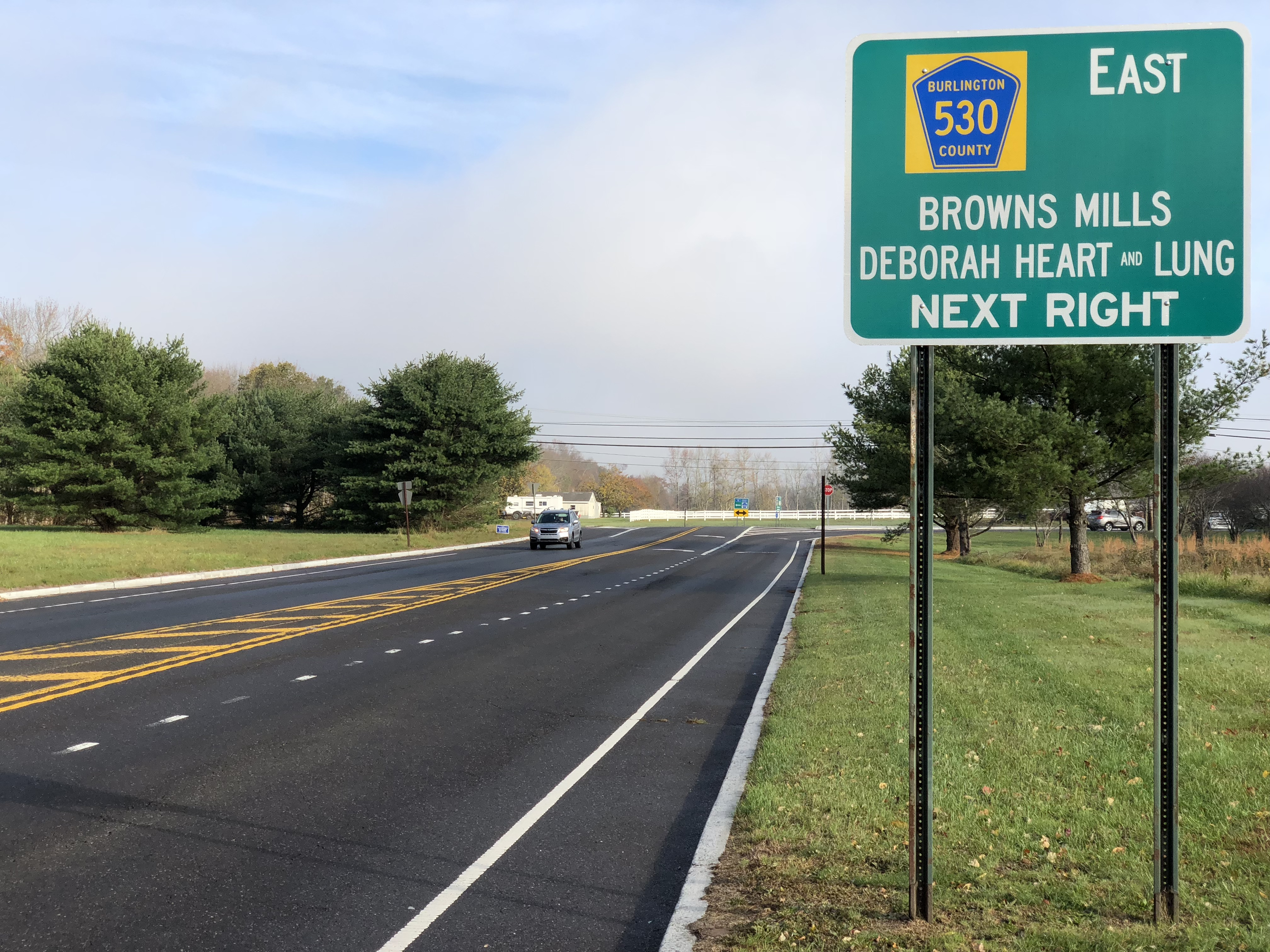
Road signage directing to Deborah Heart and Lung Center in Browns Mills

According to the United States Census Bureau, Browns Mills had a total area of 5.612 square miles (14.54 km^{2}), including 5.367 square miles (13.90 km^{2}) of land and 0.245 square miles (0.63 km^{2}) of water (4.36%).

== Demographics ==
Historical population
Census	Pop.	Note	%±
1970	7,144		—
1980	10,568		47.9%
1990	11,429		8.1%
2000	11,257		−1.5%
2010	11,223		−0.3%
2020	10,734		−4.4%
Population sources: 1970–1980; 1990–2010 2000; 2010 2020

Browns Mills first appeared as an unincorporated community in the 1970 U.S. census; and then as a census designated place in the 1980 U.S. census.

=== Racial and ethnic composition ===
Browns Mills CDP, New Jersey – Racial and ethnic composition Note: the US Census treats Hispanic/Latino as an ethnic category. This table excludes Latinos from the racial categories and assigns them to a separate category. Hispanics/Latinos may be of any race.
Race / Ethnicity (NH = Non-Hispanic)	Pop 2000	Pop 2010	Pop 2020	% 2000	% 2010	% 2020
White alone (NH)	6,752	6,755	6,116	59.98%	60.19%	56.98%
Black or African American alone (NH)	2,496	2,158	1,767	22.17%	19.23%	16.46%
Native American or Alaska Native alone (NH)	49	47	27	0.44%	0.42%	0.25%
Asian alone (NH)	409	381	328	3.63%	3.39%	3.06%
Native Hawaiian or Pacific Islander alone (NH)	8	3	18	0.07%	0.03%	0.17%
Other race alone (NH)	35	18	58	0.31%	0.16%	0.54%
Mixed race or Multiracial (NH)	456	525	943	4.05%	4.68%	8.79%
Hispanic or Latino (any race)	1,052	1,336	1,477	9.35%	11.90%	13.76%
Total	11,257	11,223	10,734	100.00%	100.00%	100.00%

=== 2020 census ===
As of the 2020 census, Browns Mills had a population of 10,734. The median age was 38.4 years. 22.8% of residents were under the age of 18 and 14.2% were age 65 or older. For every 100 females there were 95.1 males, and for every 100 females age 18 and over there were 92.2 males age 18 and over.

95.3% of residents lived in urban areas, while 4.7% lived in rural areas.

There were 3,886 households, of which 31.3% had children under age 18. Of all households, 41.4% were married-couple households, 19.2% had a male householder with no spouse or partner present, and 29.3% had a female householder with no spouse or partner present. About 23.9% of households were made up of individuals and 8.2% had someone living alone who was 65 years of age or older.

There were 4,244 housing units, of which 8.4% were vacant. The homeowner vacancy rate was 3.1% and the rental vacancy rate was 8.6%.

=== 2010 census ===
The 2010 United States census counted 11,223 people, 4,021 households, and 2,875 families in the CDP. The population density was 2,091.2 people per square mile (807.4 people/km^{2}). There were 4,268 housing units at an average density of 795.3 units per square mile (307.1 units/km^{2}). The racial makeup was 66.40% (7,452) White, 20.67% (2,320) Black or African American, 0.53% (60) Native American, 3.50% (393) Asian, 0.06% (7) Pacific Islander, 2.61% (293) from other races, and 6.22% (698) from two or more races. Hispanic or Latino of any race were 11.90% (1,336) of the population.

Of the 4,021 households, 31.6% had children under the age of 18; 46.6% were married couples living together; 18.0% had a female householder with no husband present and 28.5% were non-families. Of all households, 22.9% were made up of individuals and 6.3% had someone living alone who was 65 years of age or older. The average household size was 2.78 and the average family size was 3.22.

25.7% of the population were under the age of 18, 9.1% from 18 to 24, 26.7% from 25 to 44, 28.3% from 45 to 64, and 10.3% who were 65 years of age or older. The median age was 36.4 years. For every 100 females, the population had 95.3 males. For every 100 females ages 18 and older there were 91.3 males.

=== 2000 census ===
As of the 2000 United States census there were 11,257 people, 3,946 households, and 2,939 families living in the CDP. The population density was 799.0 people/km^{2} (2,069 people/mi^{2}). There were 4,245 housing units at an average density of 301.3 units/km^{2} (780 units/mi^{2}). The racial makeup of the CDP was 64.50% White, 22.81% African American, 0.50% Native American, 3.72% Asian, 0.07% Pacific Islander, 3.13% from other races, and 5.27% from two or more races. Hispanic or Latino of any race were 9.35% of the population.

There were 3,946 households, out of which 40.1% had children under the age of 18 living with them, 49.0% were married couples living together, 19.2% had a female householder with no husband present, and 25.5% were non-families. 20.3% of all households were made up of individuals, and 5.7% had someone living alone who was 65 years of age or older. The average household size was 2.84 and the average family size was 3.24.

In the CDP the population was spread out, with 29.3% under the age of 18, 9.2% from 18 to 24, 31.6% from 25 to 44, 21.6% from 45 to 64, and 8.4% who were 65 years of age or older. The median age was 34 years. For every 100 females, there were 91.4 males. For every 100 females age 18 and over, there were 88.6 males.

The median income for a household in the CDP was $45,008, and the median income for a family was $49,443. Males had a median income of $36,160 versus $25,239 for females. The per capita income for the CDP was $17,678. About 7.3% of families and 11.0% of the population were below the poverty line, including 13.7% of those under age 18 and 7.5% of those age 65 or over.

== Transportation ==
- NJ Transit provides bus service to and from Philadelphia on the 317 route.

== Education ==
Its school district is Pemberton Township School District.

== Notable people ==
People who were born in, residents of, or otherwise closely associated with Browns Mills include:

- Beetlejuice (born 1968), entertainer known for his appearances on The Howard Stern Show
- Orlando Cáceres (born 1961), wrestler who competed for Puerto Rico in the men's freestyle 57 kg at the 1984 Summer Olympics
- Matthew Emmons (born 1981), sharpshooter who won an Olympic gold medal at the 2004 Summer Olympics in the Men's 50 m Rifle Prone
- Ed Forchion (born 1964), cannabis activist known as NJWEEDMAN and a perennial candidate for various New Jersey elected offices
- Ed Gillespie (born 1961), former chairman or the Republican Party, senior advisor to Mitt Romney
