= List of county routes in Burlington County, New Jersey =

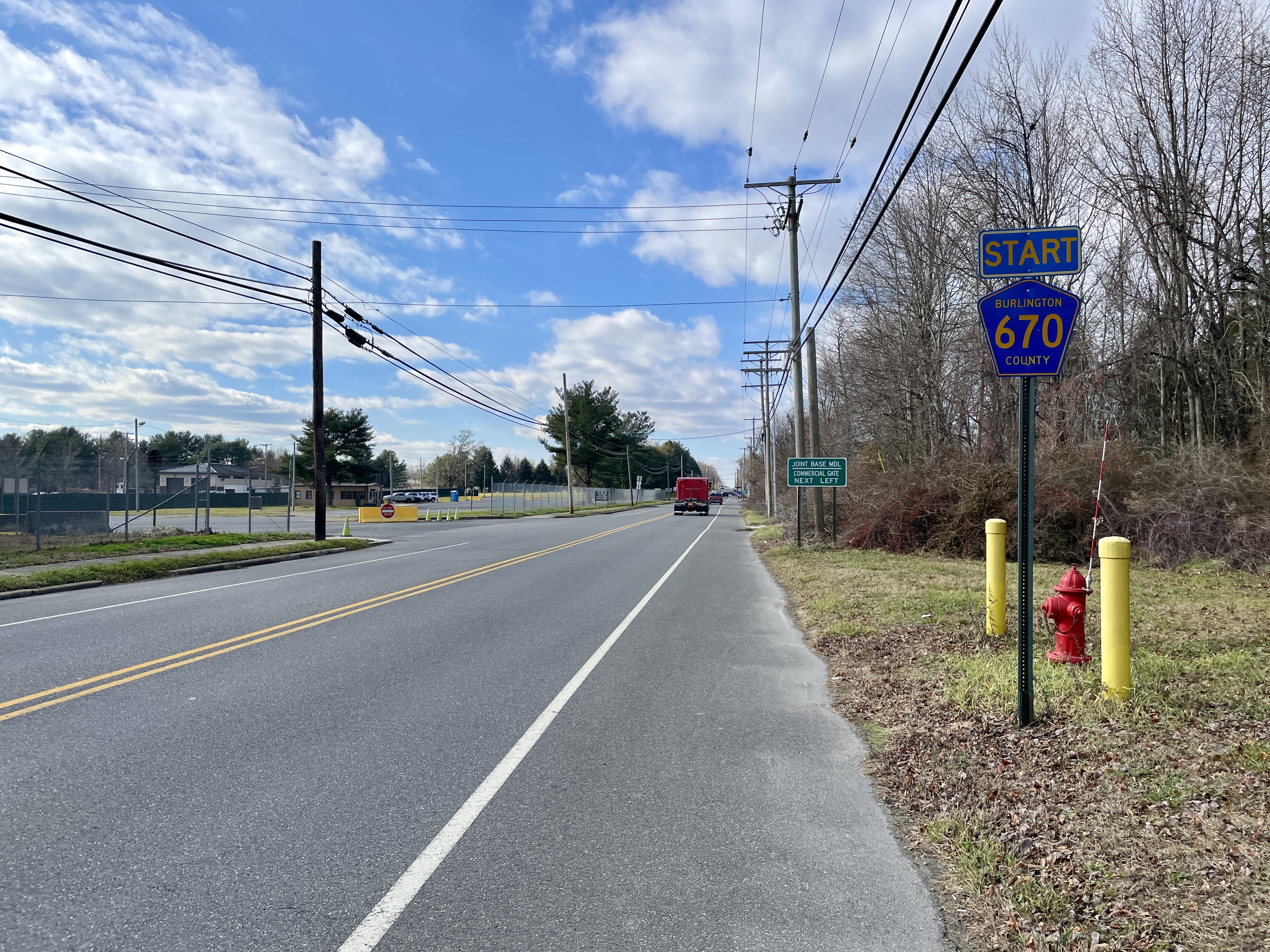
CR 670 westbound at eastern terminus in Wrightstown

The following is a list of county routes in Burlington County in the U.S. state of New Jersey. For more information on the county route system in New Jersey as a whole, including its history, see County routes in New Jersey.

== 500-series county routes ==
In addition to those listed below, the following 500-series county routes serve Burlington County:

- CR 528, CR 530, CR 532, CR 534, CR 537, CR 541, CR 542, CR 543, CR 544, CR 545, CR 563

== Other county routes ==
Route	Length (mi)	Length (km)	From	Via	To	Notes
CR 600	1.07	1.72	Old Marlton Pike (CR 600) at the Camden County line in Evesham Township	Old Marlton Pike	Route 73 in Evesham Township	
CR 601	0.16	0.26	Oxford Road in Cinnaminson Township	Hilton Road	West Broad Street (CR 543) in Palmyra	
CR 602	1.34	2.16	U.S. Route 130 in Cinnaminson Township	Highland Avenue	East Broad Street (CR 543) in Palmyra	
CR 603	10.21	16.43	Bank Avenue in Riverton	Main Street, Riverton Road, Chester Avenue, East Main Street, Mount Laurel Road	Church Road (CR 616) in Mount Laurel	
CR 604	1.49	2.40	U.S. Route 130 in Delran Township	Chester Avenue	St. Mihiel Drive (CR 543) on the Delran/Riverside township line	
CR 605	1.61	2.59	Hartford Road (CR 686) in Delran Township	Fairview Boulevard, Fairview Street	3rd Street and Rush Street in Riverside Township	
CR 606	1.52	2.45	U.S. Route 130 in Cinnaminson Township	Branch Pike	Riverton Road (CR 603) in Cinnaminson Township	
CR 607	11.27	18.14	Route 73 in Evesham Township	South Maple Avenue, North Maple Avenue, South Church Street, North Church Street, Church Road, Cinnaminson Avenue	Bank Avenue in Palmyra	Partly former Route 155
CR 608	3.58	5.76	Route 38 on the Maple Shade/Moorestown township line	Lenola Road	Church Road (CR 607) in Cinnaminson Township	
CR 609	0.56	0.90	East Main Street (CR 537) in Maple Shade Township	Stiles Avenue	Route 73 in Maple Shade Township	
CR 610	0.75	1.21	East Main Street (CR 537) in Maple Shade Township	Fellowship Road	Route 73 in Maple Shade Township	
CR 611	1.31	2.11	Kings Highway (Route 41) in Maple Shade Township	Kings Highway	West Main Street (CR 537) in Moorestown	
CR 612	12.00	19.31	South Church Street (CR 607) in Mount Laurel	Elbo Lane, Stacy Haines Road, Fostertown Road, Main Street, Bridge Road, Eayrestown Road, Pine Street	Mill Street (CR 537) in Mount Holly	
CR 613	5.43	8.74	Riverton Road (CR 603) and Chester Avenue (CR 603) in Moorestown	Bridgeboro Road, Bridgeboro Street, Scott Street, Franklin Street	Fairview Street and New Jersey Avenue in Riverside Township	
CR 614	3.64	5.86	Riverton Road (CR 603) in Moorestown	Tom Brown Road, Westfield Road	Marne Highway (CR 537) and Centerton Road in Moorestown	
CR 615	0.47	0.76	Route 38 in Mount Laurel	Marter Avenue	Marne Highway (CR 537) in Moorestown	
CR 616	28.38	45.67	Church Road (CR 616) at the Camden County line in Maple Shade Township	Church Road, Greentree Road, Church Road, Mill Street, Main Street, Pemberton Road, Pemberton–Vincentown Road, Hanover Street, Fort Dix Road, Pemberton–Wrightstown Road, Fort Dix Street, East Main Street, Wrightstown–Cookstown Road, Main Street, Cookstown–New Egypt Road	Maple Avenue (CR 616) at the Ocean County line in North Hanover Township	0.02 miles (0.032 km) gap in Fort Dix
CR 617	0.41	0.66	Mount Holly Avenue in Mount Holly	Garden Street	Branch Street (CR 537) and Garden Street (CR 537) in Mount Holly	
CR 618	4.01	6.45	Greentree Road (CR 674) and Church Road (CR 616) in Evesham Township	Evesboro–Medford Road, Medford–Evesboro Road	Route 70 in Medford	
CR 619	1.43	2.30	Marter Avenue (CR 615) in Moorestown	Centerton Road	Marne Highway (CR 537) in Mount Laurel	
CR 620	13.25	21.32	Route 73 in Evesham Township	Main Street, East Main Street, Tuckerton Road, Stokes Road, Indian Mills Road, Burnt House Road	Stokes Road (CR 541) in Shamong Township	
CR 621	2.51	4.04	Mill Street (CR 537) and Branch Street (CR 537) in Mount Holly	Mill Street, Powell Street	U.S. Route 206 on the Eastampton/Pemberton township line	
CR 622	2.82	4.54	Stokes Road (CR 541) and Tuckerton Road (CR 620) in Medford	Tuckerton Road	U.S. Route 206 on the Shamong/Tabernacle township line	
CR 623	3.23	5.20	Tomlinson Mill Road (CR 544) in Medford	Taunton Boulevard, Taunton Road, Himmelin Road	Stokes Road (CR 541) in Medford	
CR 624	2.49	4.01	Burlington Avenue (CR 543) in Delanco Township	Cooper Street, Coopertown Road, Delanco Road	U.S. Route 130 in Edgewater Park	
CR 625	1.37	2.20	Coopertown Road (CR 624) in Delanco Township	Creek Road	Bridgeboro Road in Edgewater Park	
CR 626	9.88	15.90	Warren Street (CR 543) in Beverly	Broad Street, Bridgeboro Road, Mount Holly Road, Beverly–Rancocas Road, Rancocas Bypass, Rancocas Road	High Street (CR 691) in Mount Holly	
CR 628	7.68	12.36	Union Street and Clover Street in Mount Holly	Jacksonville Road, Three Turns Road, Jacksonville–Hedding Road	Old York Road (CR 660) in Mansfield Township	
CR 629	1.00	1.61	Charleston Road (CR 630) and Levitt Parkway (CR 630) in Willingboro Township	Veterans Parkway	U.S. Route 130 in Willingboro Township	
CR 630	18.02	29.00	Warren Street (CR 543) in Beverly	Cooper Street, Charleston Road, Levitt Parkway, Woodlane Road, Irick Road, Woodlane Road, North Pemberton Road, Pointville Road	Juliustown Road (CR 669) on the Pemberton Township/New Hanover Township/Wrightstown tripoint border	
CR 631	0.9	1.45	Salem Road (CR 633) in Burlington Township	Campus Drive	U.S. Route 130 in Burlington Township	Newly added to highway system in preparation for extension project
CR 632	0.63	1.01	U.S. Route 130 in Burlington	Mott Avenue, Morris Street	High Street (CR 541) in Burlington	
CR 633	3.53	5.68	Beverly–Rancocas Road (CR 626) in Willingboro Township	Jonh F. Kennedy Way, Salem Road	Mill Road in Burlington Township	
CR 634	3.30	5.31	Charleston Road (CR 630) in Willingboro Township	Sunset Road	Burlington–Mount Holly Road (CR 541) in Burlington Township	
CR 635	7.29	11.73	Route 38 in Mount Laurel	Ark Road, Masonville Road, Creek Road, Centerton Road, Bridge Street, Rancocas Bypass, Springside Road, Rancocas Road	Burlington–Mount Holly Road (CR 541) and High Street (CR 541) in Burlington Township	
CR 636	9.80	15.77	Main Street (CR 541) in Lumberton	Fostertown Road, Masonville–Fostertown Road, Ark Road, Marne Highway, Creek Road	U.S. Route 130 in Delran Township	
CR 637	1.87	3.01	Rancocas Road (CR 626) in Westampton	Irick Road, Woodlane Road	Burlington–Mount Holly Road (CR 541) on the Westampton/Burlington township line	
CR 638	1.53	2.46	Burlington–Mount Holly Road (CR 541) in Westampton	Burrs Road	Oxmead Road (CR 639) in Westampton	
CR 639	1.53	2.46	Burrs Road (CR 638) in Westampton	Oxmead Road	Hedding–Jacksonville Road (CR 628) in Westampton	
CR 640	2.16	3.48	Route 38 in Hainesport Township	Creek Road	Main Street (CR 541) in Lumberton Township	
CR 641	9.17	14.76	Route 70 in Southampton Township	Red Lion Road, Mill Street, Landing Street, Chestnut Street, Lumberton Avenue, Lumberton Road	Marne Highway (CR 537) in Hainesport Township	
CR 642	6.45	10.38	Main Street (CR 681) in Southampton Township	Main Street, Buddtown Road, Ridge Road, Ongs Hat Road	Magnolia Road (CR 644) on the Southampton/Pemberton township line	
CR 643	0.56	0.90	Ridge Road (CR 642) and Ongs Hat Road (CR 642) in Southampton Township	Ridge Road	Pemberton Road (CR 616) in Southampton Township	
CR 644	6.79	10.93	Hanover Street (CR 616) in Pemberton	Magnolia Road	Route 70 and Route 72 at the Four Mile Circle on the Southampton/Pemberton township line	
CR 645	5.72	9.21	Magnolia Road (CR 644) in Pemberton Township	New Lisbon Road, Four Mile Road, Mount Misery Road, Junction Road	Lakehurst Road (CR 530) in Pemberton Township	
CR 646	5.44	8.75	Route 70, Route 72, and Magnolia Road (CR 644) at the Four Mile Circle in Pemberton Township	Four Mile Road	Pemberton–Brown Mills Road (CR 530) in Pemberton Township	
CR 648	8.27	13.31	Atsion Road in Shamong Township	Willow Grove Road, Old Indian Mills Road, Flyatt Road, Carranza Road	U.S. Route 206 in Southampton Township	
CR 651	0.50	0.80	CR 542 in Washington Township	Green Bank–Batsto Road	Green Bank Road (CR 563) in Washington Township	
CR 652	1.79	2.88	Lower Bank Road (CR 652) at the Atlantic County line in Washington Township	Lower Bank Road, River Road	CR 542 in Washington Township	
CR 653	1.62	2.61	Hammonton Road (CR 542) in Bass River Township	Leektown Road	Chatsworth Road (CR 679) in Bass River Township	
CR 654	2.11	3.40	US 9 in Bass River Township	East Greenbush Road	Stage Road (CR 655) in Bass River Township	
CR 655	3.9	6.28	Chatsworth Road (CR 679) and North Maple Avenue (CR 679) in Bass River Township	North Maple Avenue, Stage Road	Stage Road at the Ocean County line in Bass River Township	
CR 656	8.60	13.84	Assiscunk Creek in Burlington	Pearl Street, River Road, West Front Street, East Front Street, Delaware Avenue, Florence–Columbus Road	Columbus Road (CR 543) in Mansfield Township	
CR 657	0.62	1.00	Columbus Road (CR 655) in Burlington	Bordentown Road	U.S. Route 130 in Burlington	
CR 658	0.89	1.43	Neck Road in Burlington Township	Dultys Lane	U.S. Route 130 in Burlington Township	Maintenance swap occurred with Neck Road by 2021
CR 658	0.73	1.17	U.S. Route 130 in Burlington Township	Neck Road	River Road (CR 656) in Burlington Township	Maintenance swap occurred with Dultys Lane by 2021
CR 659	2.20	3.54	Bustleton Road (CR 661) in Florence Township	Florence–Bustleton Road, Cedar Lane	Wilbur Henry Drive in Florence Township	
CR 660	13.57	21.84	Jacksonville Road (CR 670) in Burlington Township	Old York Road, Chesterfield–Crosswicks Road, Main Street, Church Street	Church Street (CR 672) at the Mercer County line in Chesterfield Township	
CR 661	1.38	2.22	Bustleton Road at the Burlington township line in Florence Township	Burlington–Bustleton Road	Old York Road (CR 660) in Florence Township	
CR 662	3.30	5.31	U.S. Route 130 in Bordentown Township	Burlington–Bordentown Road, 4th Street, West Burlington Street, Prince Street, Park Street	U.S. Route 206 in Bordentown Township	
CR 663	2.76	4.44	Fort Dix Road (CR 616) in Pemberton Township	Old Fellows Road, Juliustown–Pemberton Road, Juliustown–Georgetown Road	Saylors Pond Road (CR 670) in Springfield Township	
CR 664	2.91	4.68	Chesterfield–Arneytown Road (CR 528) and Chesterfield–Jacobstown Road (CR 528) in Chesterfield Township	Chesterfield–Arneytown Road	Province Line Road at the Monmouth County line in North Hanover Township	
CR 665	4.74	7.63	Main Street (CR 616) in North Hanover Township	Jacobstown–Cookstown Road, Chesterfield–Jacobstown Road, Paulson Road	Chesterfield–Arneytown Road (CR 664) in North Hanover Township	
CR 666	2.92	4.70	Wrightstown–Georgetown Road (CR 545) in North Hanover Township	Sykesville Road, Croshaw Road	Jacobstown–Cookstown Road (CR 665) in North Hanover Township	
CR 667	6.19	9.96	Juliustown Road (CR 530/CR 669) and Pemberton–Brown Mills Road (CR 530) in Pemberton Township	Pemberton–Brown Mills Road, Broadway, West Lakeshore Drive, Bayberry Street, East Lakeshore Drive, Cookstown–Brown Mills Road	Wrightstown–Cookstown Road (CR 616) and Main Street (CR 616) in New Hanover Township	
CR 668	3.81	6.13	Fort Dix Road (CR 616) in Pemberton Township	Arneys Mount Road	Monmouth Road (CR 537) in Springfield Township	
CR 669	9.03	14.53	Monmouth Road (CR 537) in Springfield Township	Juliustown Road, Main Street, Lewistown Road	Pemberton–Brown Mills Road (CR 530/CR 667) and Juliustown Road (CR 530) in Pemberton Township	
CR 670	12.03	19.36	U.S. Route 130 in Burlington	Jacksonville Road, Burlington–Jacksonville Road, Jacksonville–Jobstown Road, Monmouth Road, Saylors Pond Road	Route 68 in Springfield Township	
CR 672	2.10	3.38	Bordentown–Chesterfield Road (CR 528) in Chesterfield Township	Bordentown–Crosswicks Road, Buttonwood Street	Ward Avenue in Chesterfield Township	
CR 673	2.75	4.43	Springdale Road (CR 673) at the Camden County line in Mount Laurel	Springdale Road, Church Road, Fellowship Road	South Church Street (CR 607) in Moorestown	
CR 674	6.64	10.69	Greentree Road (CR 674) at the Camden County line in Evesham Township	Greentree Road, Church Road, Hainesport–Mount Laurel Road	Marne Highway (CR 537) in Hainesport Township	
CR 677	1.47	2.37	Bordentown–Chesterfield Road (CR 528) in Chesterfield Township	Chesterfield-Crosswicks Road	Old York Road (CR 660) and Chesterfield–Crosswicks Road (CR 660) in Chesterfield Township	
CR 678	3.23	5.20	U.S. Route 206 in Mansfield Township	Columbus–Hedding Road, Kinkora Road	U.S. Route 130 in Mansfield Township	
CR 679	8.42	13.55	New York Road (U.S. Route 9) in Bass River Township	North Maple Avenue, Chatsworth Road, Harrisville–Chatsworth Road	Green Bank–Chatsworth Road (CR 563) in Washington Township	
CR 680	2.51	4.04	Wrightstown–Georgetown Road (CR 545) in Springfield Township	McGuire Access Highway, Defense Access Road	Wrightstown–Cookstown Road (CR 616) in North Hanover Township	McGuire AFB Main Gate
CR 681	1.58	2.54	U.S. Route 206 and Buddtown Road (CR 642) in Southampton Township	Buddtown Road, Main Street	U.S. Route 206 in Southampton Township	
CR 682	0.50	0.80	Route 38 in Lumberton	Maple Avenue	Marne Highway (CR 537) in Hainesport Township	
CR 683	0.68	1.09	Madison Avenue (CR 691) in Mount Holly	South Avenue	Pine Street (CR 612) in Mount Holly	
CR 684	2.67	4.30	Route 38 on the Lumberton/Southampton township line	Smithville Road	Monmouth Road (CR 537) in Eastampton Township	
CR 685	0.21	0.34	Route 70 in Southampton Township	Eayrestown Road	Red Lion Road (CR 641) in Southampton Township	
CR 686	7.90	12.71	U.S. Route 130 in Delran Township	Hartford Road	Hartford Road at the Medford township line in Mount Laurel	Western terminus changed from the Delran/Moorestown township line to U.S. Route 130 by 2021
CR 687	2.89	4.65	Hanover Street (CR 616) in Pemberton	Elizabeth Street, Pemberton–Browns Mills Road, Pemberton Bypass, Colemans Bridge Road	Magnolia Road (CR 644) in Pemberton Township	
CR 688	0.23	0.37	Van Sciver Parkway in Willingboro Township	Salem Road	Salem Road (CR 633) and John F. Kennedy Way (CR 633) in Burlington Township	
CR 690	0.79	1.27	U.S. Route 206 in Mansfield Township	Atlantic Avenue, New York Avenue	U.S. Route 206 in Mansfield Township	Old Route 170
CR 691	2.81	4.52	Main Street (CR 541) and Mount Holly Bypass (CR 541) in Lumberton	Main Street, Madison Avenue, King Street, Rancocas Road, High Street	Mount Holly Bypass (CR 541) and Burlington–Mount Holly Road (CR 541) in Mount Holly	
CR 693	1.0	1.61	Cedar Lane in Florence Township	Recovery Boulevard	Columbus Road (CR 543) in Mansfield Township	Designed by the New Jersey Department of Transportation as Cedar Lane Extension between CR 543 and CR 660
CR 694	0.47	0.76	Assiscunk Creek in Burlington	Columbus Road	U.S. Route 130 and Columbus Road (CR 543) in Burlington	Designated by the New Jersey Department of Transportation as CR 655
