= List of highways numbered 530 =

Route 530, or Highway 530, may refer to:

== Canada ==
- Alberta Highway 530
- Manitoba Provincial Road 530
- New Brunswick Route 530

== United Kingdom ==
- A530 road

== United States ==
- I-530
- US 530 (former)
- AR 530
- SR 530
  - CR 530
- Route 530
- LA 530
- SR 530 (former)
- CR 530
- SR 530
- PR-530
- SC 530 (former)
- Texas:
  - Loop 530
  - FM 530
- SR 530
- WYO 530

Preceded by 529	Lists of highways 530	Succeeded by 531
