= List of highways numbered 535 =

Route 535, or Highway 535, may refer to:

== Canada ==
- Alberta Highway 535
- New Brunswick Route 535
- Ontario Highway 535

== United Kingdom ==
- A535 road

== United States ==
- I-535
- SR 535
- CR 535 (Florida)
- MD 535
- SR 535
- CR 535 (New Jersey)
- SR 535
- PA 535 (former)
- PR-535
- Virginia State Route 535 (1930)

Preceded by 534	Lists of highways 535	Succeeded by 536
