= County Route 537 (New Jersey) =

County highway in New Jersey, U.S.

County Route 537
- CR 537 highlighted in red, spurs in blue, still signed former CR 537 segment in Monmouth County in grey

Route information
- Length: 66.22 mi (106.57 km)

Major junctions
- West end: CR 737 in Camden
- I-676 in Camden; US 30 in Camden; US 130 in Pennsauken Township; Route 73 in Maple Shade Township; US 206 in Springfield Township; I-195 in Millstone Township–Jackson Township; Route 33 in Freehold Township; US 9 in Freehold Borough; Route 18 in Colts Neck Township; Route 34 in Colts Neck; Route 35 in Eatontown
- East end: CR 11 in Oceanport

Location
- Country: United States
- State: New Jersey
- Counties: Camden, Burlington, Ocean, Monmouth

Highway system
- County routes in New Jersey; 500-series routes
| ← CR 536 | → CR 538 |

County Route 537 (CR 537) is a county highway in the U.S. state of New Jersey. The highway extends 66.22 miles (106.57 km) from Delaware Avenue (CR 737) in Camden to Oceanport Avenue (CR 11) in Oceanport. It is the state's fourth-longest 500 series county route.

== Route description ==
=== Camden and Burlington counties ===
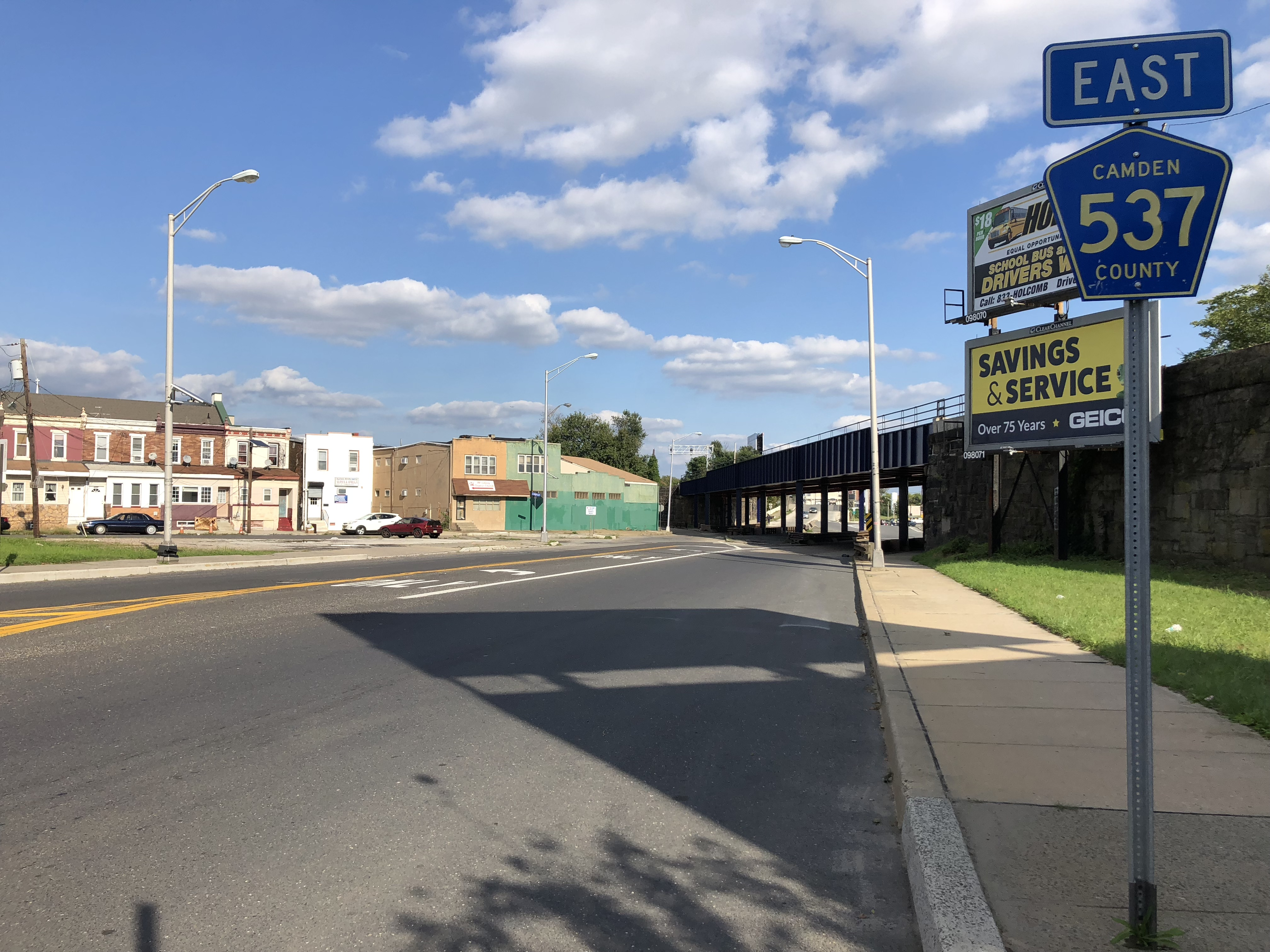
CR 537 eastbound past I-676 in Camden

CR 537 begins at an intersection with Delaware Avenue (CR 737) in the downtown area of Camden in Camden County, heading east on four-lane undivided Federal Street. West of this intersection, Federal Street continues to the Camden Waterfront on the Delaware River. The road runs east passing a few parking lots, turning into a one-way eastbound street at the intersection with 3rd Street. Market Street (CR 537 Spur) to the north is one-way westbound, serving as the westbound direction of CR 537 through Downtown Camden. From here, Federal Street passes downtown businesses as it alternates between two and four lanes, crossing NJ Transit's River Line at the intersection with 5th Street. The route intersects with Broadway (CR 551) and Haddon Avenue (CR 561) before coming to an interchange with Interstate 676 (I-676). After this, CR 537 Spur merges onto CR 537 and the road becomes two-way and two lanes wide as it passes under a railroad line that carries Conrail Shared Assets Operations' Vineland Secondary and the River Line. The route interchanges with U.S. Route 30 (US 30) and crosses the Cooper River and intersects with River Road (CR 543). The road passes through urban areas of businesses and industry, crossing the intersection with State Street/Marlton Pike (CR 601) and becoming lined with businesses. CR 537 comes to the intersections of Westfield Avenue (CR 610) and 27th Street (CR 609) as it heads into more residential areas, intersecting with 36th Street (CR 611). At this point, the road becomes the border between Pennsauken Township to the north and Camden to the south, meeting the intersection with Terrace Avenue (CR 663). The route fully enters Pennsauken and turns north and east as a four-lane divided highway, interchanging with US 130 in commercial areas. CR 537 becomes two lanes and undivided again as it heads into suburban Merchantville as Maple Avenue, passing through wooded areas of homes. The road intersects with Browning Road (CR 612) and Lexington Avenue (CR 613) prior to passing a few businesses as it reaches the intersections of Chapel Avenue (CR 626), Park Avenue (CR 621), and Centre Street (CR 622). The route passes more homes, crossing the intersection with Cove Road/Church Road (CR 616) and then passing over NJ Transit's Atlantic City Line on a bridge. CR 537 then passes businesses as it intersects with Union Avenue (CR 615). At a point shortly before the intersection with Haddonfield Road (CR 644), CR 537 becomes the border between Pennsauken to the north and Cherry Hill to the south. Shortly after this crossing, the road heads through more residential surroundings.

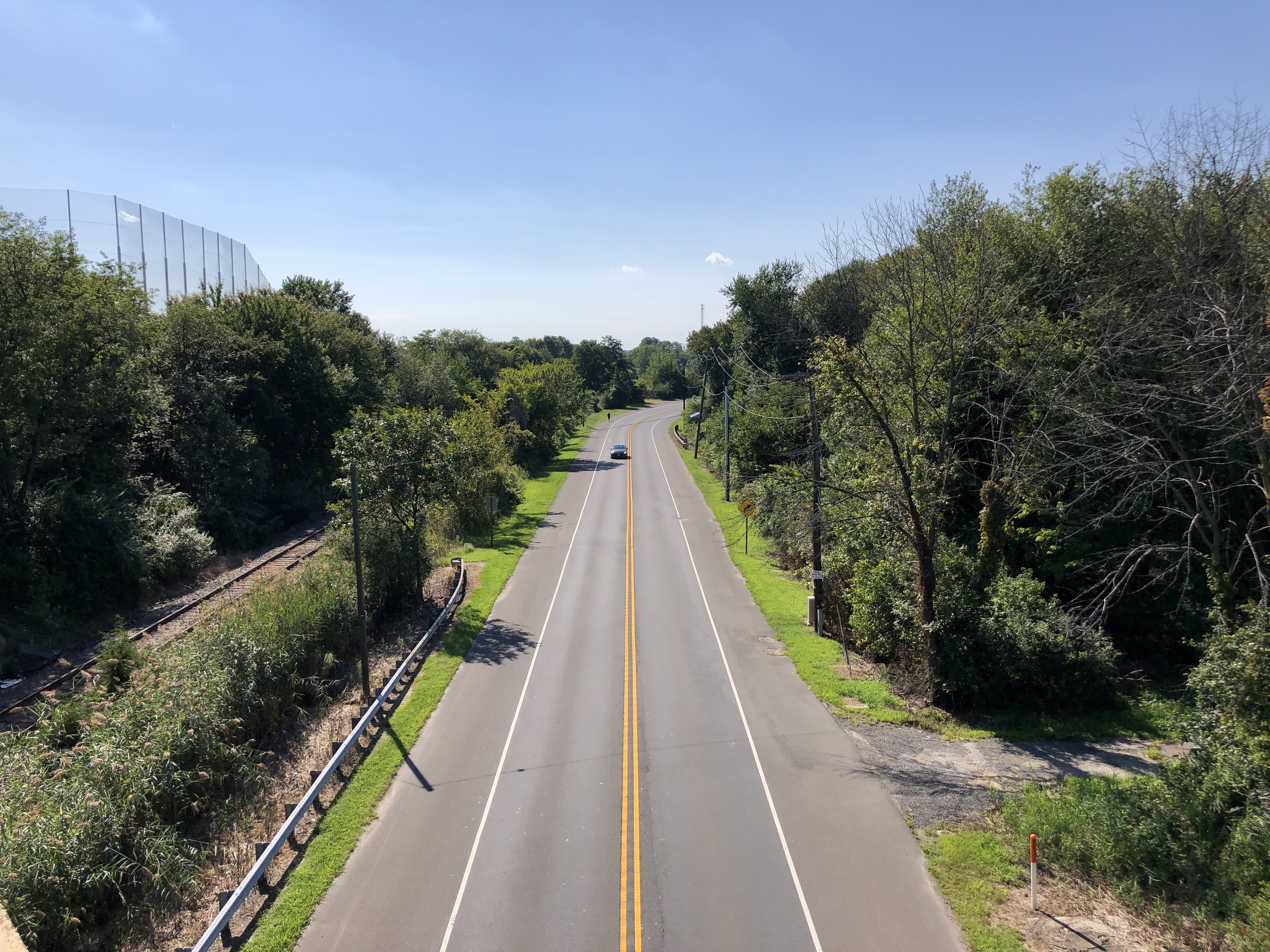
View westbound along CR 537 from I-295 in Mount Laurel

Upon crossing the Pennsauken Creek, CR 537 enters Maple Shade Township in Burlington County and becomes West Main Street, passing a mix of homes and businesses before heading into the commercial downtown of Maple Shade. The name of the route changes to East Main Street after crossing the intersection with Fork Landing Road and intersects with Fellowship Road (CR 610) as it continues into residential and business areas and meeting the intersection with Stiles Avenue (CR 609). After an interchange with Route 73, the road crosses the North Branch of the Pennsauken Creek into Moorestown and becomes Camden Avenue as it passes a few businesses before crossing the intersection with Lenola Road (CR 608). At this point, CR 537 enters wooded areas of homes and reaches the intersection with Kings Highway (CR 611), where the route turns northeast onto West Main Street. The road passes homes and businesses in the downtown area of Moorestown, crossing the intersection with Church Street (CR 607) and becoming East Main Street. The route passes more homes and intersects with Chester Avenue (CR 603). CR 537 briefly joins CR 603 until it splits from CR 537 by turning southeast on Mount Laurel Road before coming to the intersection with Marter Avenue (CR 615). CR 537 becomes Marne Highway at this intersection and turns east as it runs immediately to the south of Conrail Shared Assets Operations' Pemberton Industrial Track line, passing a mix of business parks and fields and enters Mount Laurel. Upon intersecting with Centerton Road (CR 619), the route turns north as a four-lane divided highway and heads through fields, crossing the railroad tracks and re-enters Moorestown. At the intersection with Westfield Road (CR 614), CR 537 turns southeast as a two-lane undivided road, re-entering Mount Laurel and turns east and running parallel to the north of the Conrail tracks again as it passes under I-295 and the New Jersey Turnpike, within a short distance of each other. The road heads through a mix of farms and homes as it crosses the intersection with Hartford Road (CR 686) before continuing east into areas of residential subdivisions as it crosses the intersection with Ark Road/Masonville Road (CR 635). The route heads through more wooded areas of residences as it intersects with Creek Road (CR 636) and enters Hainesport Township. CR 537 passes between homes and businesses to the north and industrial areas to the south as it comes to the intersection with Hainesport–Mount Laurel Road (CR 674). The road passes over the South Branch of the Rancocas Creek and passes more residential areas as it intersects with Lumberton Road (CR 641).

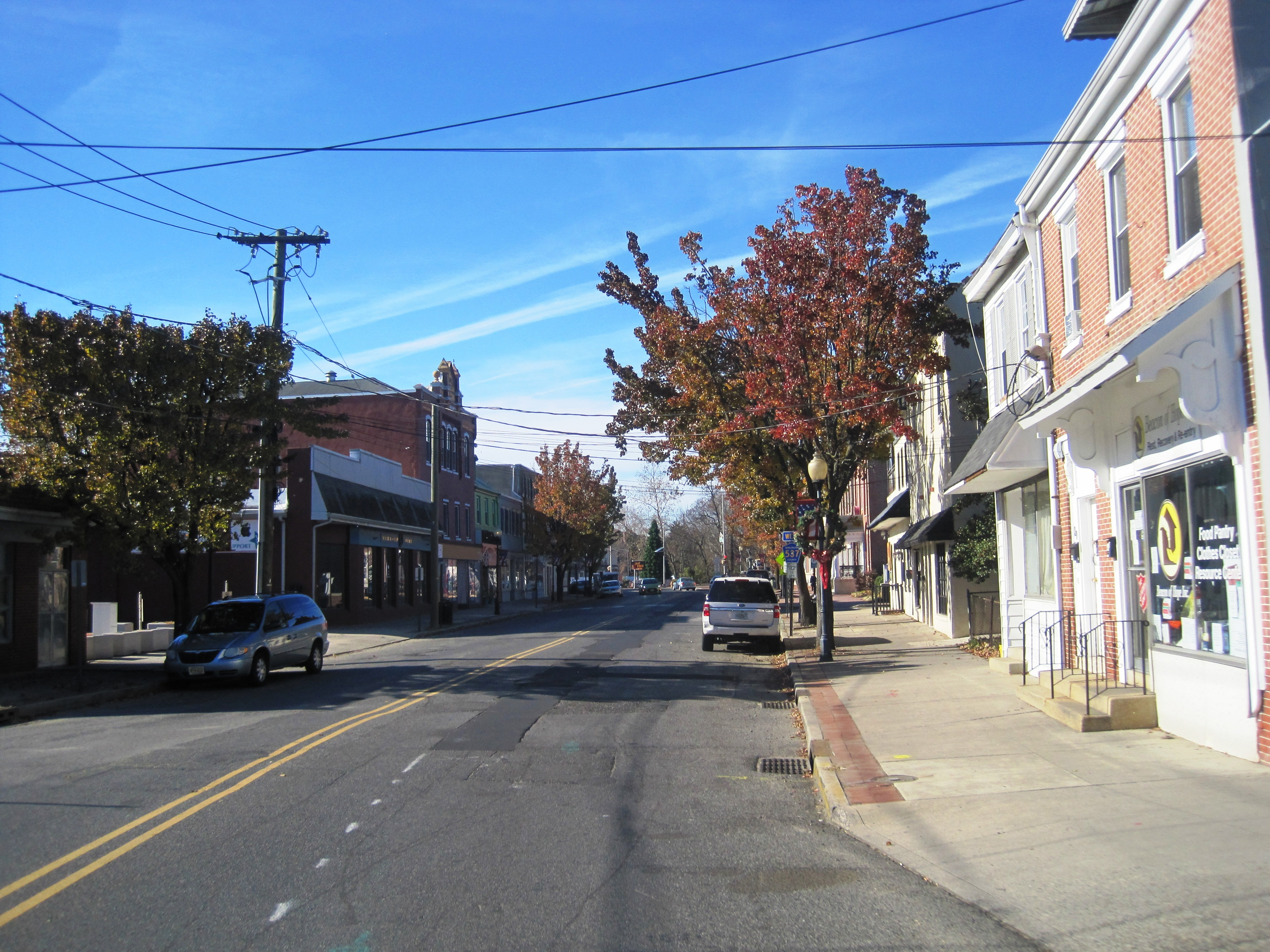
CR 537 (Mill Street) through downtown Mount Holly

The road crosses the intersection with Mount Holly Bypass (CR 541) and runs near more homes, intersecting with Maple Avenue (CR 682) before it heads into Mount Holly and becomes Washington Street. The route passes businesses as it crosses the intersection with King Street/Madison Avenue (CR 691) and continues into the commercial downtown of Mount Holly as Mill Street, coming to the intersection with Pine Street (CR 612) as it curves northeast and east past more homes. CR 537 turns northeast onto Branch Street, with CR 621 continuing east along Mill Street. The route intersects with Garden Street (CR 617) and CR 537 continues northeast along Garden Street. Upon crossing into Eastampton Township, CR 537 becomes Monmouth Road and passes more residences before passing businesses at the intersection with Woodlane Road (CR 630). The road continues into a mix of farmland, woodland, and homes after this intersection and meets the intersection with Smithville Road (CR 684) before entering Springfield Township. The route heads through open farm fields here and intersects with Juliustown Road (CR 669) prior to crossing the intersection with US 206. The road passes through more agriculture and woods with occasional residences as it intersects with Arneys Mount Road (CR 668) before intersecting with Jacksonville–Jobstown Road (CR 670). CR 670 briefly joins the road until it splits from CR 537 by turning southeast on Saylors Pond Road. Farther northeast, CR 537 crosses the intersection with Route 68 and turns more to the east as it passes woods to the north and agricultural areas to the south. After intersecting with Wrightstown–Georgetown Road (CR 545) in commercial areas, the route enters Chesterfield Township and passes more farms before passing through rural areas of homes and crossing into North Hanover Township. The road heads through more farmland as it comes to the intersection with Jacobstown–Cookstown Road (CR 665) before passing near residential subdivisions and crossing the intersection with Jacobstown–New Egypt Road (CR 528). After this intersection, the road becomes concurrent with CR 528 Truck and passes through woods before heading into open farmland.

=== Ocean and Monmouth counties ===
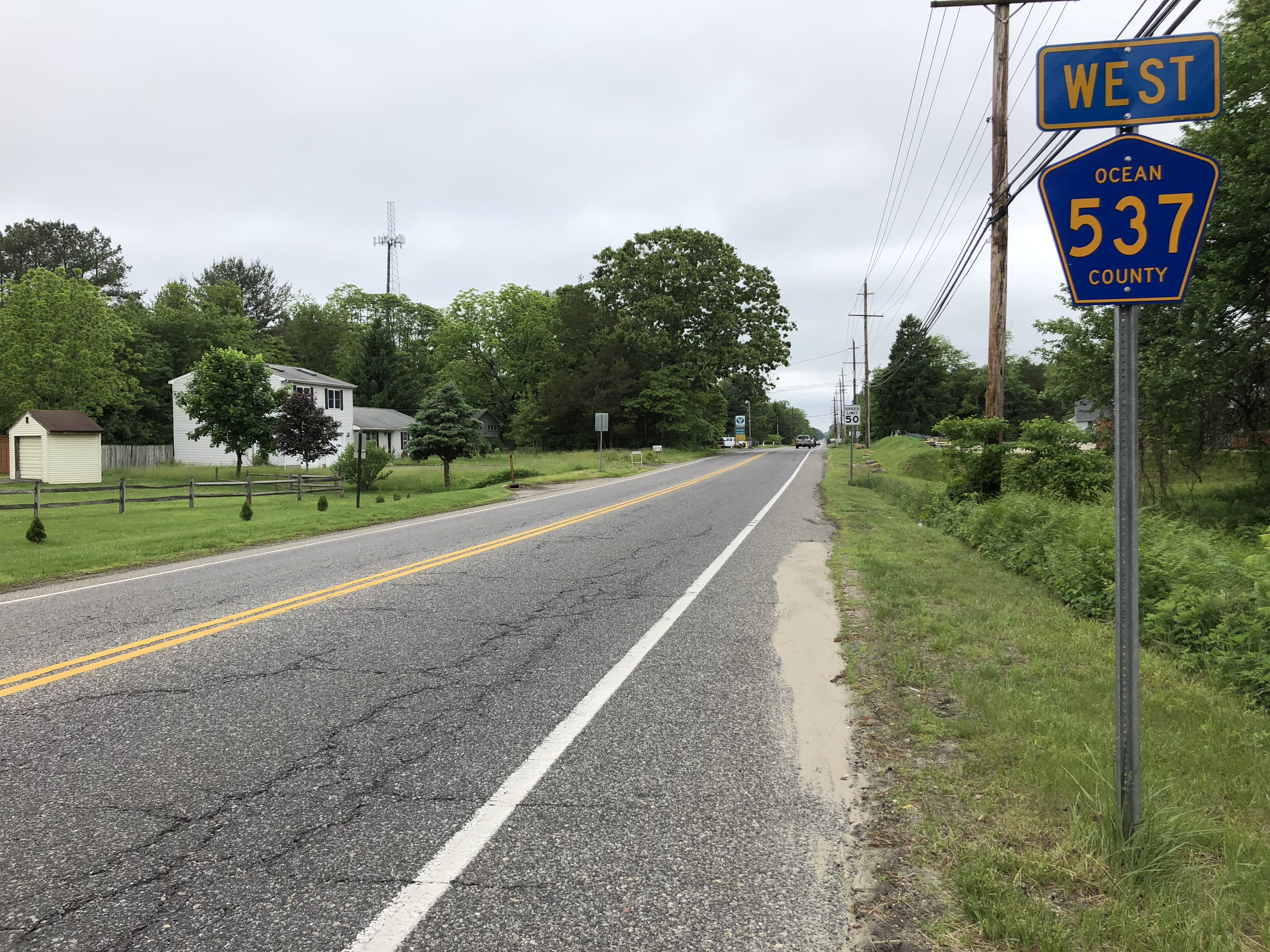
CR 537 westbound on the border of Monmouth and Ocean counties

After crossing the intersection with Province Line Road, CR 537 becomes the border between Upper Freehold Township, Monmouth County, to the northwest and Plumsted Township, Ocean County, to the southeast. The road heads through a mix of farms, wooded areas, and some development, intersecting with Holmes Mill Road (CR 27)/Evergreen Road (CR 8). Farther northeast, the route passes near businesses as it intersects with Main Street (CR 27) as well as Hornerstown Road (CR 26) prior to crossing the intersection with Hornerstown–Whiting Road (CR 539), where CR 528 Truck turns south along CR 539. Past Hornerstown–Whiting Road (CR 539), CR 537 enters more forested areas with a few homes and farms, becoming the border between Upper Freehold to the northwest and Jackson Township to the southeast at the intersection with Hawkin Road (CR 640). The route heads into dense forests and becomes the border between Millstone Township to the northwest and Jackson to the southeast, passing to the west of Prospertown Lake before coming to the entrance of the Six Flags Great Adventure amusement park, which is located in Jackson. CR 537 intersects an exit from the amusement park before coming to an interchange with a westbound exit and eastbound entrance that serves Six Flags. At this point, the route widens into a six-lane divided highway with a Jersey barrier and jughandles, passing a mix of woods and businesses before reaching the interchange with I-195. At this interchange, CR 537 narrows back into a two-lane undivided road and passes the Jackson Premium Outlets before crossing the intersection with Trenton–Lakewood Road (CR 526/CR 571). Past this intersection, the road heads into forested areas with some residences.

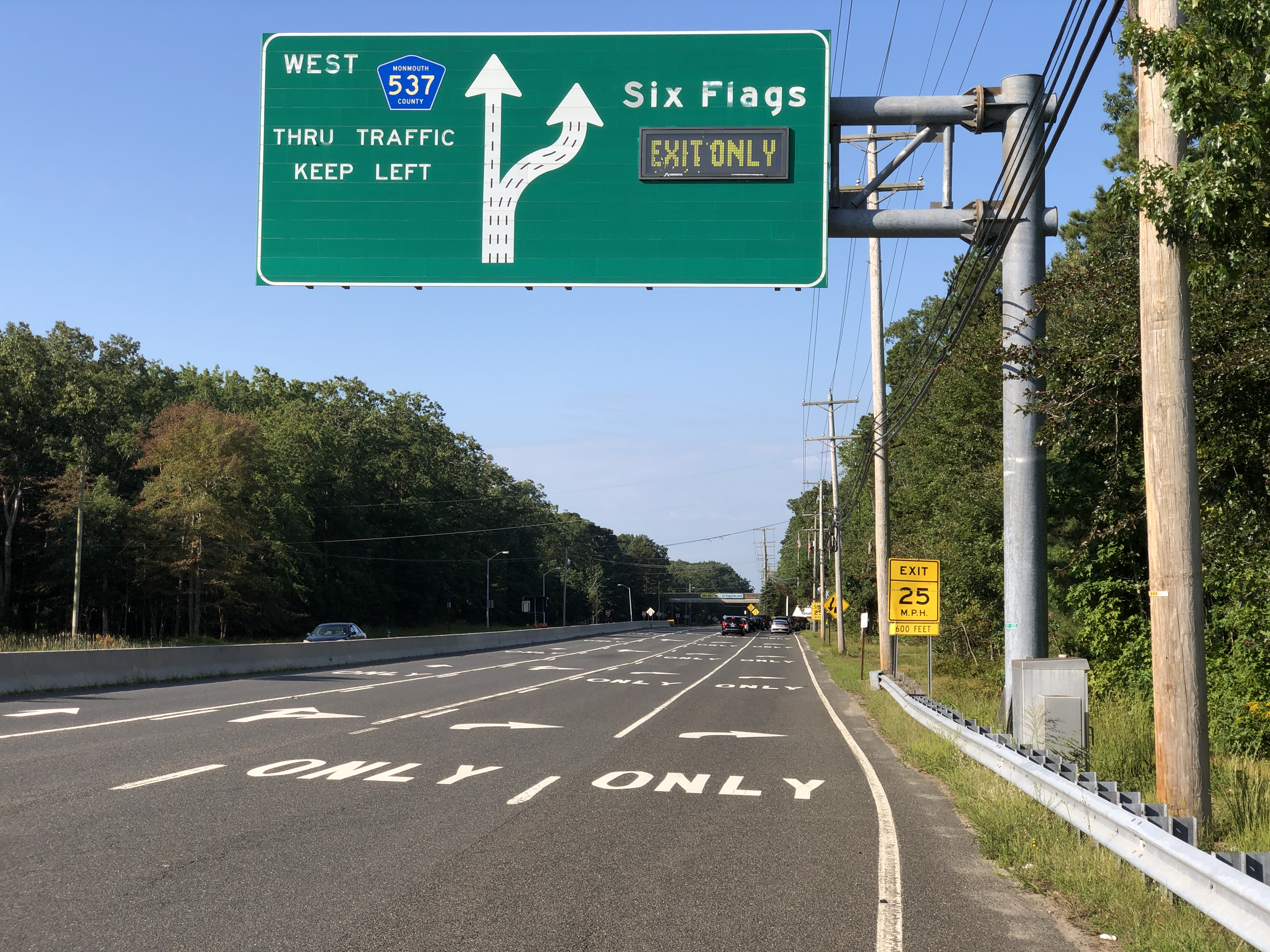
CR 537 westbound at the entrance to Six Flags Great Adventure

CR 537 fully enters Monmouth County and becomes the border between Millstone Township to the northwest and Freehold Township to the southeast, passing through more forests before coming to an intersection with Stagecoach Road (CR 524). CR 524 runs concurrently with CR 537 at this point, with the two routes continuing northeast. Upon crossing the intersection with Smithburg Road/Siloam Road (CR 527) in Smithburg, the road forms the border between Manalapan Township and Freehold Township as it passes near farms and homes. In the community of Elton in Manalapan Township, CR 524 splits from CR 537 by turning east on Elton–Adelphia Road, with CR 537 continuing northeast past residential subdivisions. Upon crossing the intersection with Thompson Grove Road, the route fully enters Freehold Township and becomes West Main Street, passing more housing developments along with some farms. The road widens to four lanes and briefly becomes a divided highway after intersecting with Gravel Hill Road. From here, the route becomes undivided shortly before passing CentraState Medical Center to the north and enters several business areas. After intersecting with Wal-Mart Drive/Castranova Way, the road reaches an interchange with Route 33. From this interchange, CR 537 passes the entrance to the Freehold Raceway Mall, as well as a farm to the south, prior to interchanging with US 9. At this point, the road heads into Freehold Borough on Main Street and passes homes as it intersects with Park Avenue (Route 33 Business). The route narrows to two lanes as it intersects with Manalapan Avenue (CR 24) and continues into the commercial downtown of Freehold. At this point, CR 537 passes southeast of the Freehold Center bus terminal and crosses the Freehold Industrial Track railroad line operated by the Delaware and Raritan River Railroad at the intersection with Throckmorton Street (CR 522) before coming to the intersection with South Street (Route 79). Here, Route 79 briefly runs concurrently with CR 537 before it heads north on Broadway. CR 537 continues east-northeast along East Main Street, passing through residential areas and meeting the trailhead of the Henry Hudson Trail. The route crosses back into Freehold Township and becomes Colts Neck Road as it passes through more areas of housing developments and intersecting with Kozloski Road (CR 55) at a signalized intersection where westbound CR 537 traffic exits before the signal to travel through a small interchange to access Kozloski Road (CR 55).

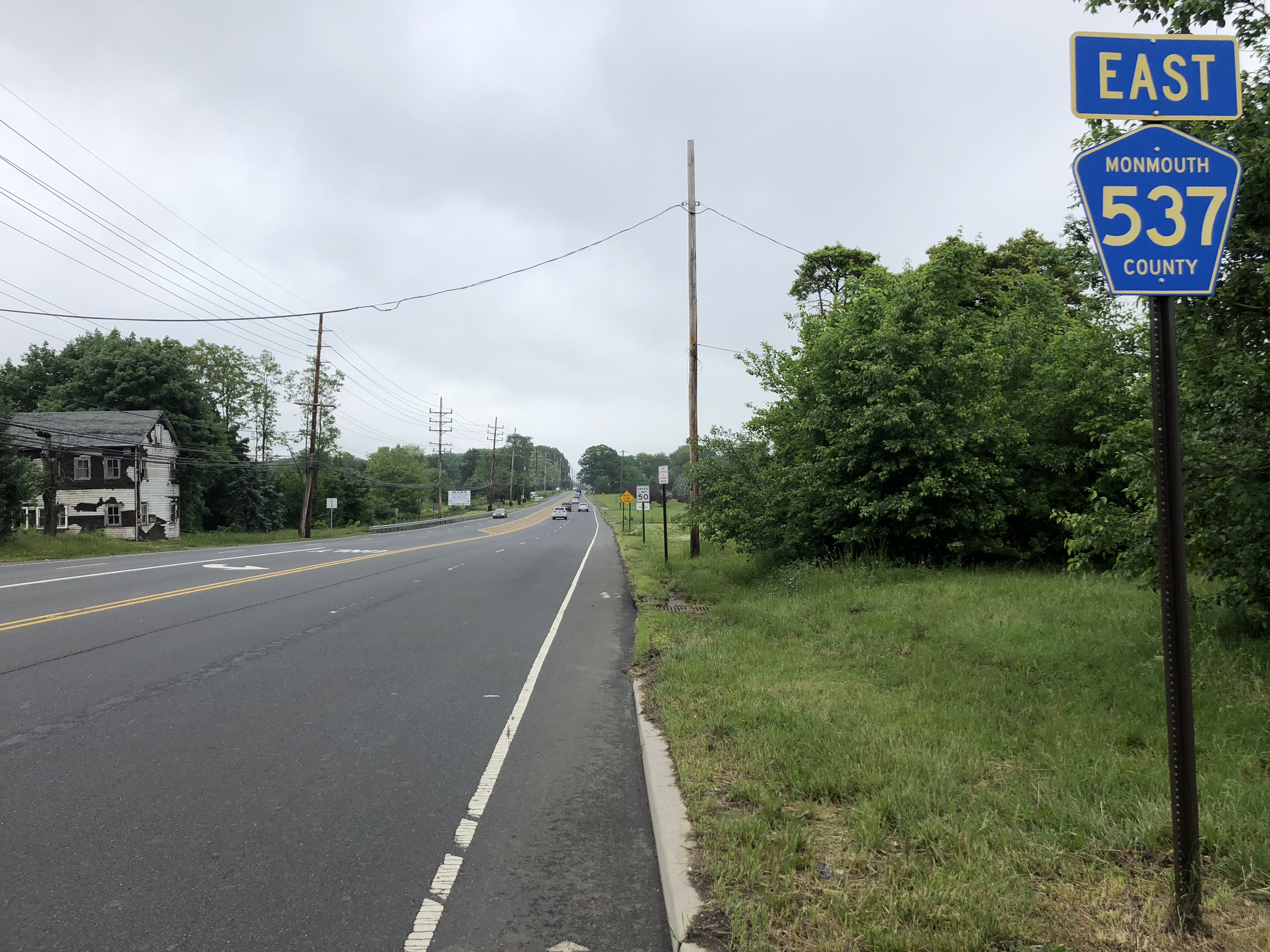
CR 524 and CR 537 eastbound on the border of Freehold and Manalapan townships

Upon entering Colts Neck Township, the road comes to an interchange with Route 18. CR 537 continues past Colts Neck High School, along with more homes, and passes Hominy Hill Golf Course to the south in the Bucks Mill section of the township, before coming to the intersection with Route 34. At this intersection, CR 537 becomes unsigned and heads into agricultural areas. After passing under Normandy Road, which serves as a road and railroad link between the two sections of Naval Weapons Station Earle, the route heads northeast through a mix of farms and housing developments. Upon intersecting with Swimming River Road (CR 50), CR 537 heads into Tinton Falls and turns southeast onto Tinton Avenue. The road enters wooded areas of homes, coming to the intersections of Sycamore Avenue (CR 13A) and Wayside Road (CR 38). After the latter intersection, the route turns east and passes over the Garden State Parkway. The road passes more homes before crossing the intersection with Hope Road (CR 51) into Eatontown. In this area, CR 537 passes more development and crosses the Southern Secondary railroad line operated by the Delaware & Raritan River Railroad before intersecting with Main Street (Route 35) at the former entrance to Fort Monmouth. The route enters the former military base on a road known as the Avenue of Memories. On this portion, the road is lined by trees and memorials to U.S. Army Signal Corps soldiers killed during World War II. It enters Oceanport still within the confines of Fort Monmouth traveling along Saltzman Avenue and Hildreth Avenue before ending at a signalized intersection with Oceanport Avenue (CR 11).

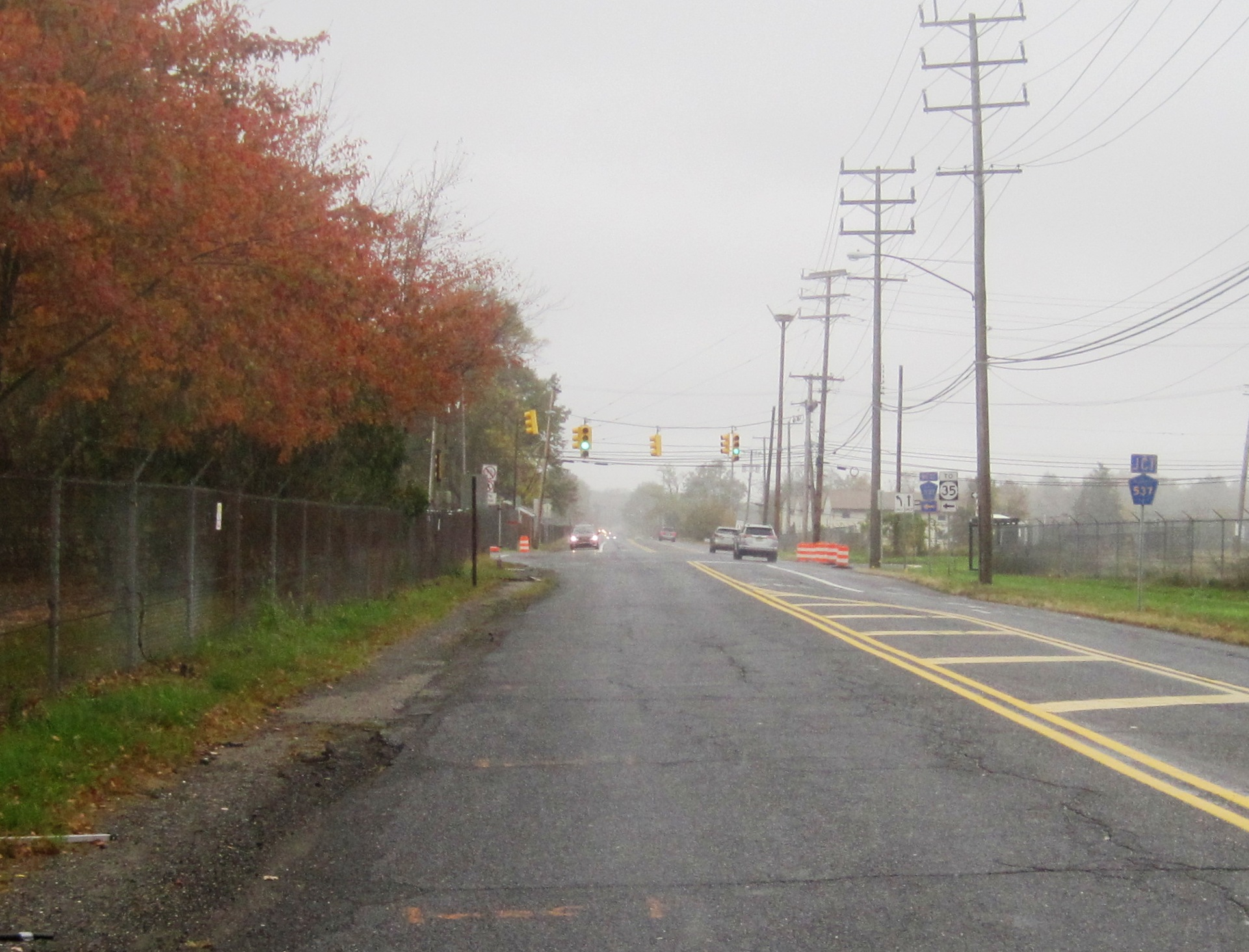
Signage for CR 537 at its eastern terminus along Oceanport Avenue (CR 11)

== History ==
From Mount Holly to Moorestown, the road was part of a King's Highway extending from South Amboy to Salem, chartered in 1681.

In the mid-19th century, several turnpikes maintained what would become CR 537:

- Moorestown and Camden Turnpike: Camden to Moorestown, chartered in 1849, following what is now CR 551 to Camden
- Mount Holly and Moorestown Turnpike: Moorestown to Mount Holly, chartered in 1852, built on the road built as part of the King's Highway
- Mount Holly and Jobstown Turnpike: Mount Holly to Jobstown, chartered in 1853
- Freehold and Smithville Turnpike: Smithburg to Freehold Township, chartered in 1858
- Freehold and Colts Neck Turnpike: Freehold to Colts Neck, chartered in 1859
- Tinton Falls Turnpike: Colts Neck to Shrewsbury, following Sycamore Avenue to Shrewsbury Village, with a branch to Eatontown, chartered in 1866

The road from Camden to Sykesville was signed as part of the Camp Dix Way, an auto trail extending from Camden to Point Pleasant. The road from Camden to what is now US 206 was part of Route 38 until a bypass route was built.

Another CR 537 Spur previously existed, which is now CR 613 and CR 614 in Burlington County.

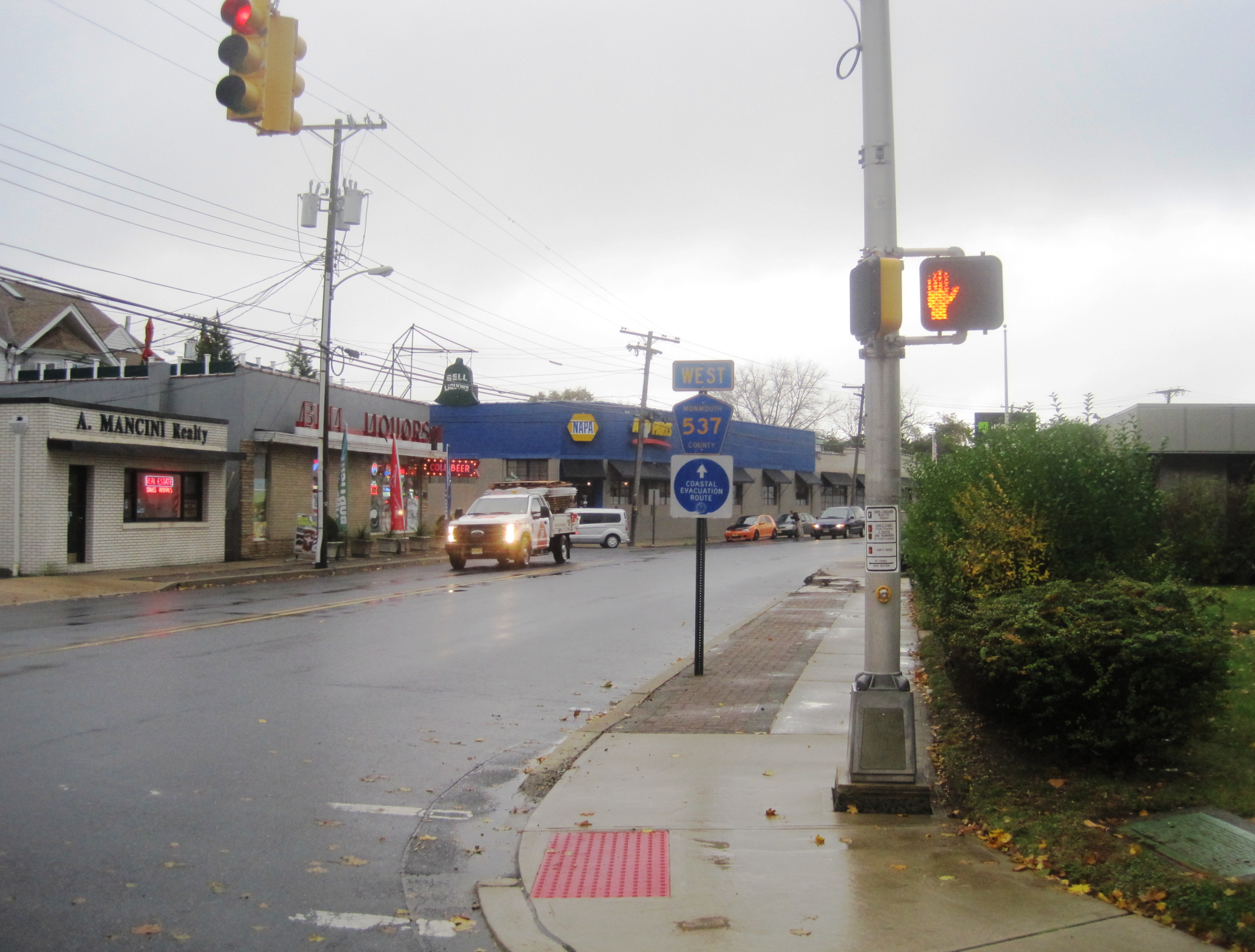
The former eastern terminus of CR 537 in Long Branch still signed as CR 537 in November 2017

The road that now carries CR 537 through the former Fort Monmouth was originally open to the public but closed after the September 11 attacks. Following the base's closure in 2011, the gates across the Avenue of Memories were locked. As a requirement for the issuance of bonds by Monmouth County for use in redevelopment of the former base, the county required the allowance for public through traffic on the road. In 2016, the county started reconstruction on the 1.72-mile-long (2.77 km) road through the base. The completed reconstructed road was opened to the public on January 17, 2017, and subsequently made part of CR 537. Upon opening, both directions of travel use Saltzman Avenue and Hildreth Avenue on the Oceanport side of the fort. However, in the future, the roads will be reconfigured as a one-way pair similarly to how the roads operated when the base was in use. Eastbound traffic will use Saltzman and Hildreth avenues while westbound traffic will use Russel Avenue, Sherill Avenue, and Wilson Avenue.

Prior to 2017, CR 537's eastern terminus was in Long Branch at the intersection with Broadway and Myrtle Avenue. From its present intersection with Route 35 outside of Fort Monmouth in Eatontown, it traveled south on Route 35 running concurrently with it for just under 1/4 mile (0.40 km), ran along Route 71 from its northern terminus in Downtown Eatontown to the Oceanport boundary, then along Eatontown Boulevard and Broadway through Oceanport, West Long Branch (where it intersected Route 36), and Long Branch. In February 2017, the Monmouth County Board of Chosen Freeholders passed a resolution officially making the road through Fort Monmouth part of CR 537 while the old county-maintained portions of Eatontown Boulevard and Broadway became an extension of CR 547 (which previously ended at Route 71 and CR 537 in Eatontown). However as of November 2022, signage for CR 537 still appears along the former section of the road from Fort Monmouth's entrance to Long Branch.

== Major intersections ==
| County | Location | mi | km | Destinations | Notes |
|---|---|---|---|---|---|
| Camden | Camden | 0.00 | 0.00 | CR 737 north (Delaware Avenue) | Western terminus; southern terminus of CR 737 |
| Camden | Camden | 0.52 | 0.84 | CR 551 (Broadway) | |
| Camden | Camden | 0.64 | 1.03 | CR 561 south (Haddon Avenue) | Northern terminus of CR 561 |
| Camden | Camden | 0.81 | 1.30 | I-676 | Exit 5A on I-676; ramp from southbound I-676 to eastbound CR 537 only |
| Camden | Camden | 0.91 | 1.46 | CR 537 Spur west (Market Street) | Eastern terminus of CR 537 Spur |
| Camden | Camden | 1.15 | 1.85 | US 30 – Benjamin Franklin Bridge, Cherry Hill | Interchange |
| Camden | Camden | 1.34 | 2.16 | CR 543 north (River Road) | Southern terminus of CR 543 |
| Camden | Pennsauken Township | 3.46 | 5.57 | US 130 – Burlington, Westville | Interchange |
| Burlington | Maple Shade Township | 7.67 | 12.34 | Route 73 to N.J. Turnpike | Interchange |
| Burlington | Hainesport Township | 17.62 | 28.36 | CR 541 (Mt. Holly Bypass) – Burlington, Lumberton | |
| Burlington | Springfield Township | 22.22 | 35.76 | US 206 – Trenton, Hammonton | |
| Burlington | Springfield Township | 27.40 | 44.10 | Route 68 to I-95 / N.J. Turnpike – Bordentown, Fort Dix | |
| Burlington | Springfield–Chesterfield township line | 28.38 | 45.67 | CR 545 (Wrightstown–Georgetown Road) to CR 680 – Bordentown, Wrightstown, Joint Base McGuire-Dix-Lakehurst | |
| Burlington | North Hanover Township | 32.11 | 51.68 | CR 528 (Jacobstown–New Egypt Road) | Western end of CR 528 Truck concurrency |
| Monmouth–Ocean county line | Upper Freehold–Plumsted township line | 35.76 | 57.55 | CR 539 / CR 528 Truck east (Hornerstown–Whiting Road) – Allentown, Manchester Township | Eastern end of CR 528 Truck concurrency |
| Monmouth–Ocean county line | Millstone–Jackson township line | 40.23– 40.38 | 64.74– 64.99 | Six Flags | Interchange |
| Monmouth–Ocean county line | Millstone–Jackson township line | 41.67 | 67.06 | I-195 to I-95 / N.J. Turnpike / G.S. Parkway – Trenton, Shore Points | Exit 16 on I-195 |
| Monmouth–Ocean county line | Millstone–Jackson township line | 42.21 | 67.93 | CR 526 / CR 571 (Trenton Lakewood Road) – Allentown, Clarksburg, Shore Points | |
| Monmouth | Millstone–Freehold township line | 46.31 | 74.53 | CR 524 west (Stagecoach Road) – Allentown, Clarksburg | Western end of CR 524 concurrency |
| Monmouth | Millstone–Manalapan– Freehold township tripoint | 46.72 | 75.19 | CR 527 (Smithburg Road, Siloam Road) | Forms the municipal tripoint Smithburg |
| Monmouth | Manalapan–Freehold township line | 47.54 | 76.51 | CR 524 east (Elton–Adelphia Road) | Eastern end of CR 524 concurrency |
| Monmouth | Freehold Township | 50.81 | 81.77 | Route 33 to US 9 south – Hightstown, Trenton, Asbury Park | Interchange |
| Monmouth | Freehold Township–Freehold Borough line | 51.32 | 82.59 | US 9 | Interchange |
| Monmouth | Freehold Borough | 51.56 | 82.98 | Route 33 Bus. (Park Avenue) to N.J. Turnpike / G.S. Parkway – Asbury Park | |
| Monmouth | Freehold Borough | 52.15 | 83.93 | CR 522 west (Throckmorton Street) | Eastern terminus of CR 522 |
| Monmouth | Freehold Borough | 52.20 | 84.01 | Route 79 south (South Street) | Western end of Route 79 concurrency |
| Monmouth | Freehold Borough | 52.38 | 84.30 | Route 79 north (Broadway) | Eastern end of Route 79 concurrency |
| Monmouth | Colts Neck Township | 55.24 | 88.90 | Route 18 – New Brunswick, Shore Points | Exits 22A-B on Route 18 |
| Monmouth | Colts Neck Township | 57.92 | 93.21 | Route 34 – Matawan, Asbury Park, Brielle | |
| Monmouth | Eatontown | 64.50 | 103.80 | Route 35 (Main Street) – Red Bank, Asbury Park | Access to Monmouth Medical Center |
| Monmouth | Oceanport | 66.62 | 107.21 | CR 11 (Oceanport Avenue) | Eastern terminus |
1.000 mi = 1.609 km; 1.000 km = 0.621 mi: Concurrency terminus; Incomplete access

== Special routes ==
County Route 537 Spur
- Location: Camden
- Length: 1.08 mi (1.74 km)

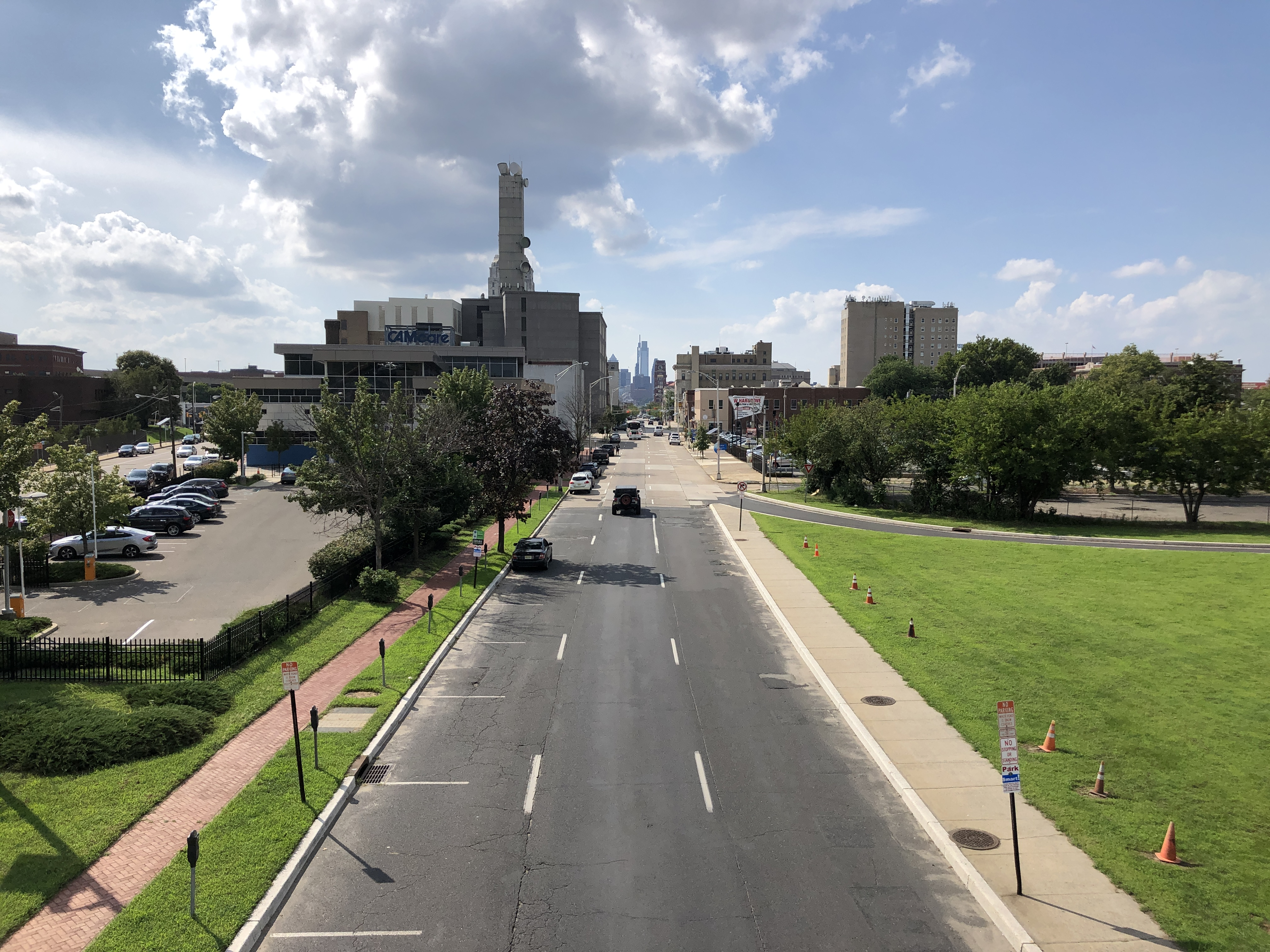
View west along CR 537 Spur from I-676 in Camden

County Route 537 Spur (CR 537 Spur) extends 1.1 miles (1.8 km) from Delaware Avenue (CR 737) to CR 537 in Camden. The route is one-way westbound and serves as the westbound direction of CR 537 through Downtown Camden.

Major intersections
The entire route is in Camden, Camden County.

| mi | km | Destinations | Notes |
|---|---|---|---|
| 1.08 | 1.74 | CR 737 south (Delaware Avenue) | Western terminus; northern terminus of CR 737 |
| 0.56 | 0.90 | CR 551 (Broadway) | |
| 0.27 | 0.43 | I-676 | Exit 5B on I-676; ramp from southbound I-676 |
| 0.00 | 0.00 | CR 537 east (Federal Street) | Eastern terminus |
1.000 mi = 1.609 km; 1.000 km = 0.621 mi: Incomplete access
