= List of highways numbered 529 =

Route 529, or Highway 529, may refer to:

== Canada ==
- Alberta Highway 529
- Ontario Highway 529
  - Ontario Highway 529A

== United Kingdom ==
- A529 road

== United States ==
- SR 529 (former highway proposal)
- MD 529
- SR 529
- CR 529
- SR 529
- PR-529
- FM 529
- SR 529

Preceded by 528	Lists of highways 529	Succeeded by 530
