= County Route 534 (New Jersey) =

County highway in New Jersey, U.S.

County Route 534
- CR 534 highlighted in red

Route information
- Maintained by Gloucester County, Camden County, NJDOT, Burlington County
- Length: 22.80 mi (36.69 km)

Major junctions
- West end: Cooper Street on the Woodbury–Deptford Township line
- Route 47 in Deptford Township; CR 544 in Deptford Township; Route 41 in Deptford Township; Route 168 in Gloucester Township; Route 42 in Gloucester Township; US 30 / CR 561 in Berlin; Route 73 in Berlin Township; CR 541 in Shamong Township
- East end: CR 620 in Shamong Township

Location
- Country: United States
- State: New Jersey
- Counties: Gloucester, Camden, Burlington

Highway system
- County routes in New Jersey; 500-series routes
← CR 533	→ CR 535

County Route 534 (CR 534) is a county highway in the U.S. state of New Jersey. The highway extends 22.86 miles (36.79 km) from Cooper Street on the border of Woodbury and Deptford Township to Indian Mills Road (Burlington CR 620) in Shamong Township.

== Route description ==
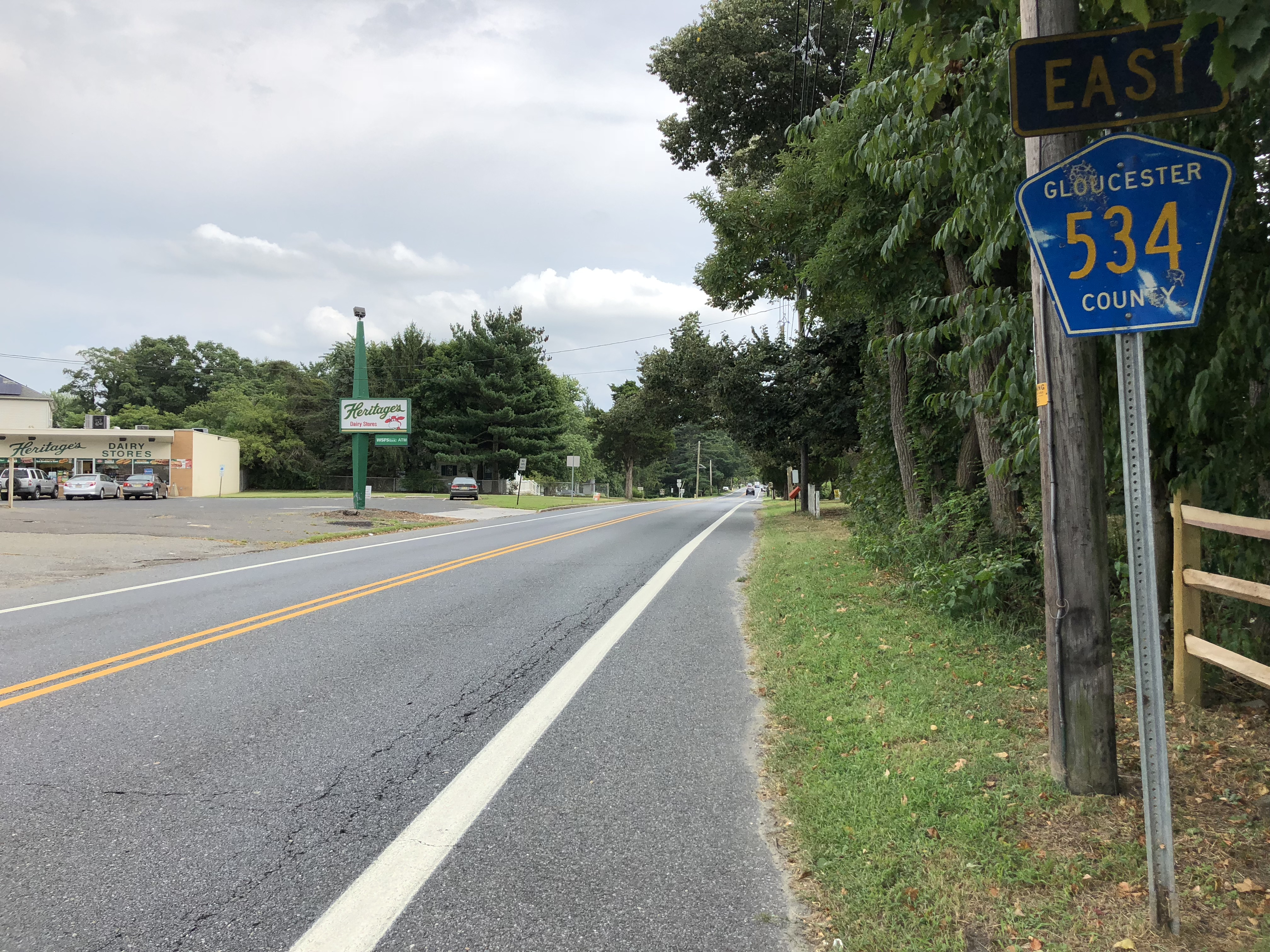
CR 534 eastbound past CR 706 in Deptford Township

CR 534 begins along Cooper Street on the eastern edge of Woodbury, Gloucester County. It travels east along the two-lane Cooper Street through Deptford Township passing over the New Jersey Turnpike then widening to a four-lane undivided boulevard before coming to an intersection with Route 47. From Route 47, CR 534 heads through residential and commercial areas. The road narrows to two lanes after the CR 544 intersection before CR 534 splits from Cooper Street by heading southeast onto Good Intent Road, with CR 706 continuing along Cooper Street. The route passes more homes as it intersects CR 647 right before passing over the Route 55 freeway. The road turns more to the east-southeast as it crosses CR 621 and comes to the Route 41 intersection. CR 534 continues through residential areas prior to crossing into Washington Township, where it turns south and intersects CR 681 and CR 603 in a wooded areas.

Upon crossing the South Branch of Big Timber Creek, CR 534 continues east into Gloucester Township, Camden County as East Church Road and passes homes in the community of Blackwood. In this area, the route crosses Route 168 (Black Horse Pike) prior to passing more residences. After CR 706 joins from the north, CR 534 interchanges with the Route 42 freeway before CR 706 splits south again. At this point, the route becomes Blackwood-Clementon Road and enters business areas, crossing CR 759. The road widens to four lanes before intersecting CR 673, where it narrows back to two lanes and forms the border between Lindenwold to the north and Pine Hill to the south. Here, the road passes through a mix of woods and residential and commercial areas, meeting CR 687 prior to entering Clementon and becoming Berlin Road. In Clementon, CR 534 intersects CR 683 before intersecting CR 703/CR 728 and Conrail Shared Assets Operations' Beesleys Point Secondary railroad line, and CR 686 in quick succession. The route heads into commercial areas as Clementon Road and intersects CR 727, CR 694, and CR 695 as it passes Clementon Amusement Park. The road turns southeast into wooded residential areas prior to heading east and meeting CR 733. The road forms the border between Clementon to the north and Pine Hill to the south until crossing CR 691, where CR 534 enters Berlin and passes more homes as a four lane road. The road crosses CR 692 and heads into more commercial surroundings as it intersects CR 702 and then US 30 and CR 690, at which point CR 534 forms a concurrency with US 30.

The two routes head southeast on the four-lane White Horse Pike, becoming concurrent with CR 561 a short distance later. The road turns to the south-southeast and passes through the downtown area of Berlin as a two-lane road. Past the downtown area, CR 534 and CR 561 split from US 30 at the same intersection, with CR 534 heading east on Jackson Road and CR 561 heading southeast on Tansboro Road. Jackson Road carries CR 534 through residential areas, crossing into Berlin Township upon passing over NJ Transit's Atlantic City Line. The road enters commercial areas as it crosses Route 73 before continuing into Waterford Township. In this area, the route passes a mix of woodland and homes, intersecting CR 713, CR 715, and CR 710. Farther east, CR 534 enters more dense forests of the Pine Barrens and comes to a junction with CR 714 near the former Atco Raceway. From this point, the road heads northeast into sparsely populated areas.

Upon crossing the Mullica River, CR 534 continues into Shamong Township in Burlington County and becomes Jackson-Indian Mills Road. The road turns north-northeast, becoming Oak Shade Road at the Atsion Road intersection, and heads into a mix of farms and woods and reaches an intersection with CR 541. From here, CR 534 passes woodland and some homes as it reaches its eastern terminus at CR 620.

== History ==
CR 534 formerly continued west from its current terminus through Woodbury. It began at the intersection with Route 44 in West Deptford Township, adjacent to Interstate 295/U.S. Route 130's interchange 21 and traveled east along Delaware Street (current CR 640) to downtown Woodbury, intersected Route 45/CR 551, became Cooper Street and intersected CR 553 before continuing onto its current route. Some signage along Delaware and Cooper streets imply that CR 534 still exists through Woodbury.

A disconnected segment of CR 534 also once existed in Barnegat Township (formerly Union Township), Ocean County. This segment was originally a part of County Route 532 and ran from Route 72 to US 9 with an interchange with the Garden State Parkway. By 1984, the road had been renumbered to County Route 554.

== Major intersections ==
County	Location	mi	km	Destinations	Notes
Gloucester	Deptford Township–Woodbury municipal line	0.00	0.00	Cooper Street	
Gloucester	Deptford Township	0.59	0.95	Route 47 (Delsea Drive) – Camden, Glassboro	
Gloucester	Deptford Township	0.99	1.59	CR 544 east (Clements Bridge Road)	Western terminus of CR 544
Gloucester	Deptford Township	2.82	4.54	Route 41 (Hurffville Road) – Runnemede, Haddonfield, Glassboro	
Camden	Gloucester Township	4.42	7.11	Route 168 (Black Horse Pike)	Access to Kennedy Memorial Hospital UMC
Camden	Gloucester Township	5.04	8.11	Route 42 north – Walt Whitman Bridge	Exit 8 (Route 42); access from Route 42 south / to Route 42 north only
Camden	Berlin	11.45	18.43	US 30 west (White Horse Pike) – Camden	West end of US 30 overlap
Camden	Berlin	11.64	18.73	CR 561 north (Haddon Avenue)	West end of CR 561 overlap
Camden	Berlin	12.23	19.68	US 30 east / CR 561 south (White Horse Pike) – Hammonton, Tansboro	East end of US 30/CR 561 overlap
Camden	Berlin Township	13.26	21.34	Route 73 – Marlton, Folsom	
Camden	Berlin Township	13.40	21.57	CR 536 Spur north (Hopewell Road)	Southern terminus of northern segment of CR 536 Spur
Burlington	Shamong Township	22.05	35.49	CR 541 (Stokes Road)	
Burlington	Shamong Township	22.80	36.69	CR 620 (Indian Mills Road) / Oak Shade Road	
1.000 mi = 1.609 km; 1.000 km = 0.621 mi: Concurrency terminus; Incomplete access
