= County Route 541 (New Jersey) =

County highway in New Jersey, U.S.

County Route 541
- CR 541 highlighted in red, CR 541 Truck highlighted in blue

Route information
- Length: 23.84 mi (38.37 km)

Major junctions
- South end: US 206 in Shamong Township
- CR 534 in Shamong Township; CR 532 in Medford Lakes; Route 70 in Medford; Route 38 in Lumberton; CR 537 in Hainesport Township; N.J. Turnpike in Westampton; I-295 in Burlington Township
- North end: US 130 / CR 543 in Burlington

Location
- Country: United States
- State: New Jersey
- Counties: Burlington

Highway system
- County routes in New Jersey; 500-series routes
← CR 540	→ CR 542

County Route 541 (CR 541) is a county highway in the U.S. state of New Jersey. The highway extends 23.84 miles (38.37 km) from U.S. Route 206 (US 206) in Shamong Township to US 130/CR 543 in Burlington.

== Route description ==
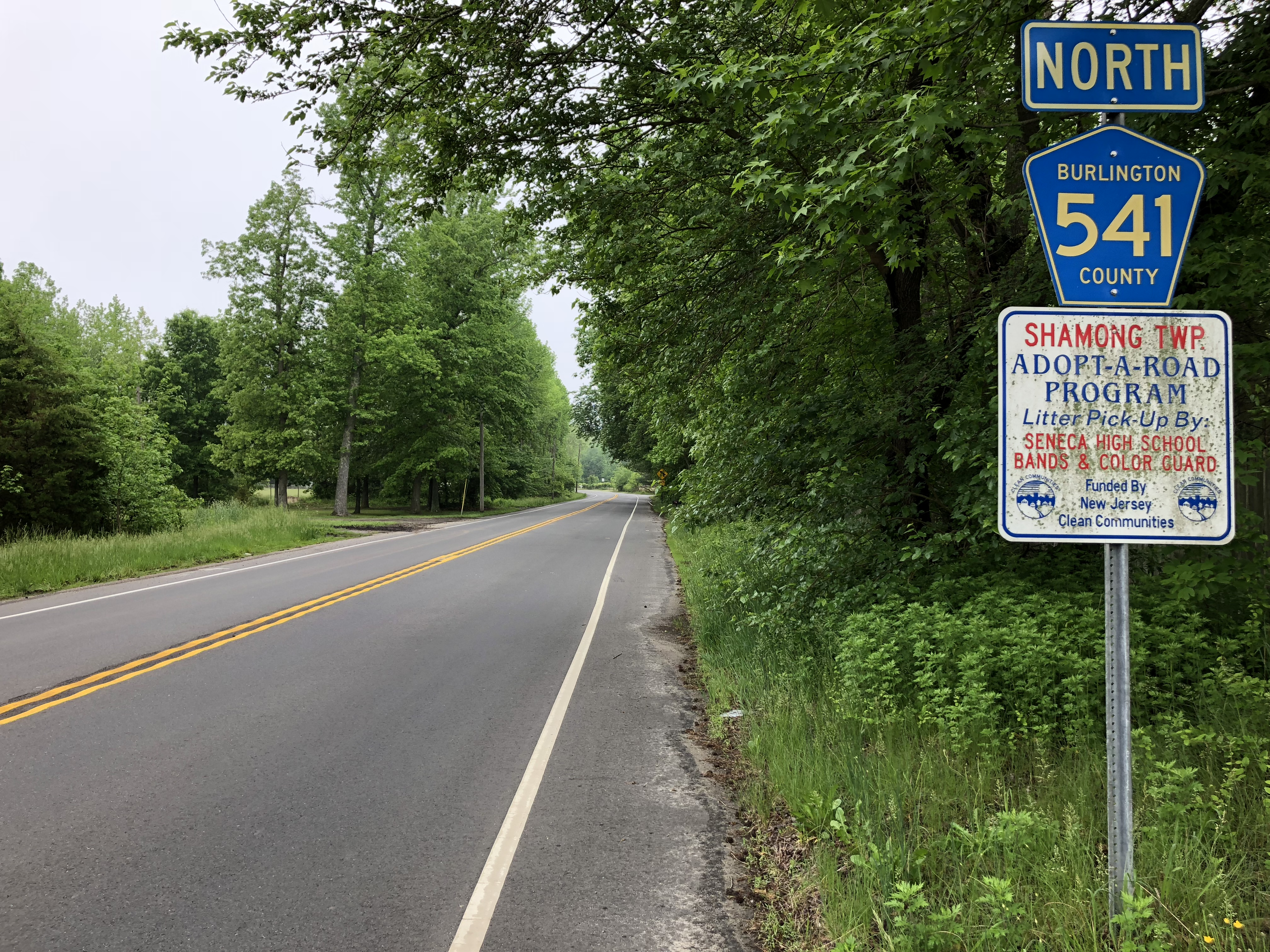
View north along CR 541 at Route 206 in Shamong

CR 541 begins at an intersection with US 206 in Shamong Township, Burlington County, heading northwest on two-lane undivided Stokes Road. The road passes through forested areas before intersecting, entering a mix of farms and homes. The route reaches the intersection with Willow Grove Road (CR 648) before crossing the intersection with Oakshade Road (CR 534). CR 541 continues through wooded areas with a few farm fields before heading into forested areas with a few residences and intersects with Indian Mills Road (CR 620). The route briefly joins with CR 620 as it crosses into Medford and intersects with Tuckerton Road (CR 622), where CR 620 splits from CR 541 by turning northwest on Tuckerton Road. CR 541 eventually forms the border between Medford to the west and Medford Lakes to the east before fully entering Medford Lakes as it continues through forested residential subdivisions to the west of Aetna Lake. After the intersection with Tabernacle Road (CR 532), the route gains a center left-turn lane and borders Medford Lakes to the west and Medford to the east before fully entering Medford again as it passes businesses, with a four-lane stretch near the intersection with Jackson Road. The road narrows to two lanes and passes a few farms before coming into the residential and commercial downtown of Medford, where CR 541 becomes South Main Street and North Main Street. The route crosses the intersection with Route 70, at which point it becomes Medford-Mount Holly Road and passes residential areas as it reaches the intersection with Church Road (CR 616). CR 541 continues through a mix of farmland, woodland, and some homes as it crosses into Lumberton. Here, the road intersects with Fostertown Road (CR 636/CR 612). The route briefly joins with CR 612 and splits from CR 541 by turning east on Bridge Road before coming near a few residential subdivisions as it comes to the intersections of Creek Road (CR 640) and Landing Street (CR 641), the road name continuing as Main Street.

CR 541 passes near woods and homes before splitting from Main Street by turning west onto the four-lane undivided Mount Holly Bypass; CR 691 continues north on Main Street towards Mount Holly. The road turns north and becomes a divided highway as it passes through industrial areas and comes to an intersection with Route 38. After this, the route enters Hainesport Township and passes more industry before crossing the Conrail Shared Assets Operations' Pemberton Industrial Track railroad line and intersects with Marne Highway (CR 537). The road turns northwest and then northeast through wooded areas and crosses into Mount Holly. After crossing the Rancocas Creek, the route intersects with Rancocas Road (CR 626) and heads north, bordering Westampton to the west and Mount Holly to the east, passing residential neighborhoods and briefly enters Mount Holly. Upon intersecting with High Street (CR 691), CR 541 turns northwest onto Burlington-Mount Holly Road, a four-lane divided highway that has intersections with jughandles. The route fully enters Westampton and crosses the intersection with Woodlane Road (CR 630), where it heads into agricultural areas with some businesses, meeting the intersection with Burrs Road (CR 638). CR 541 comes to an interchange with the New Jersey Turnpike and intersects with Irick Road (CR 637) a short distance later. From this point, the road becomes a six-lane divided highway and crosses into Burlington Township, where it heads into businesses areas, passing the former Burlington Center Mall. The route comes to a cloverleaf interchange with Interstate 295 (I-295) and narrows back to four lanes, passing more businesses. At the intersection with Sunset Road (CR 634), CR 541 narrows into an undivided road that passes a mix of residences and commercial establishments, becoming Mount Holly Road before intersecting with Rancocas Road (CR 635). At this point, the route turns north onto High Street, a three-lane road with a center left-turn lane that runs through residential areas as it comes into Burlington. After the intersection with Morris Street (CR 632), CR 541 becomes a four-lane undivided road that passes businesses before coming to its northern terminus at the intersection with US 130/CR 543. High Street continues north from here into Downtown Burlington.

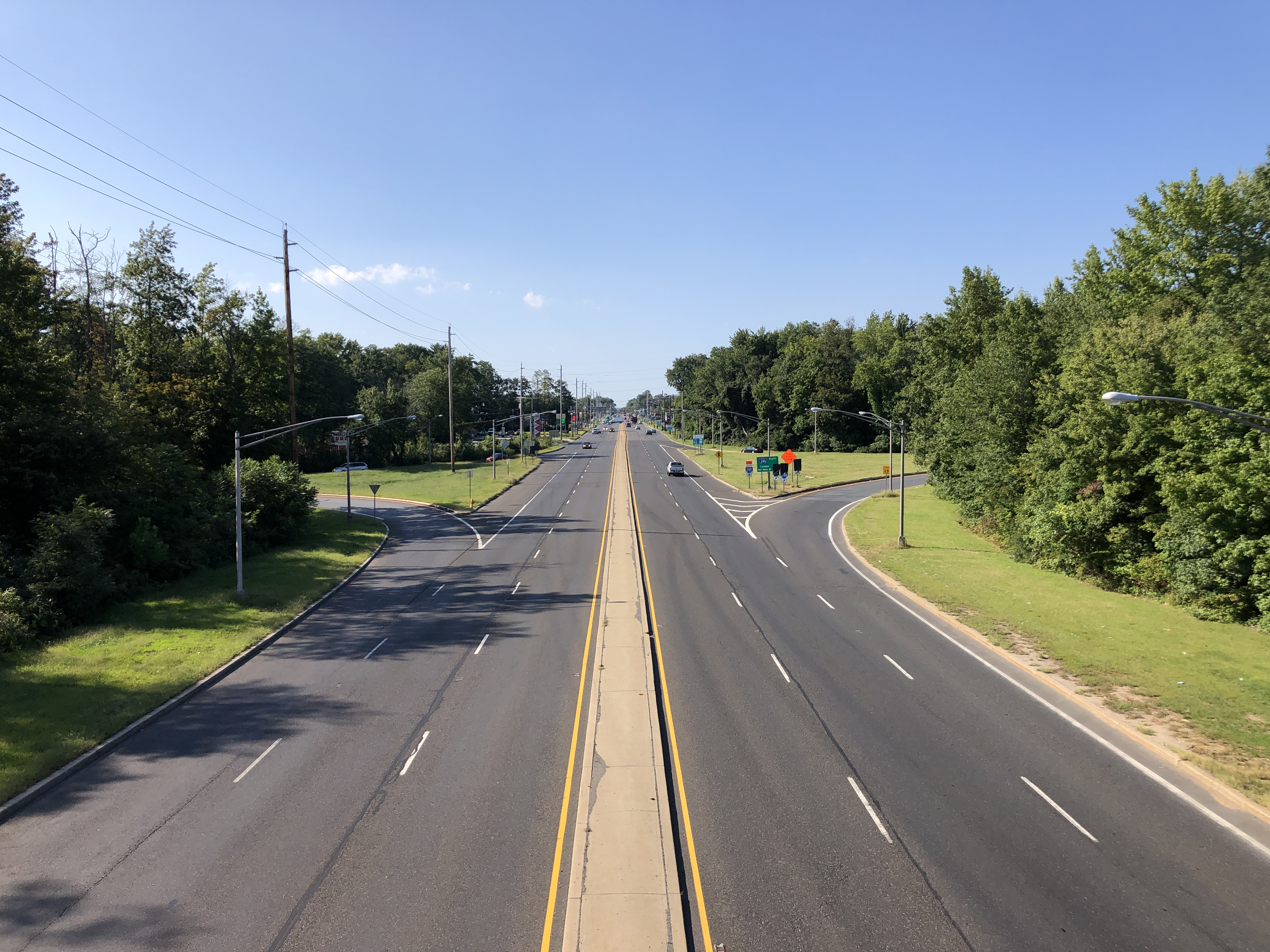
View northbound along CR 541 from I-295 in Burlington Township

== History ==
From Mount Holly to Medford, the road was once maintained by the Mount Holly, Lumberton, and Medford Turnpike, chartered in 1854. The road from Mount Holly to Burlington was once maintained by the Mount Holly and Burlington Turnpike, chartered in 1857.

The Mount Holly Bypass was formerly County Route 541 Alternate while CR 541 ran through the town. The former route of CR 541 through Mount Holly is now Burlington County Route 691.

== Major intersections ==
The entire route is in Burlington County.

Location	mi	km	Destinations	Notes
Shamong Township	0.00	0.00	US 206 – Trenton, Hammonton	Southern terminus
Shamong Township	2.95	4.75	CR 534 (Oakshade Road)	
Medford Lakes–Medford Township municipal line	7.50	12.07	CR 532 east (Tabernacle Road)	Western terminus of CR 532
Medford Township	10.51	16.91	Route 70	
Lumberton Township	16.34	26.30	Route 38 to I-295	
Hainesport Township	16.82	27.07	CR 537 (Marne Highway)	
Westampton	20.10	32.35	N.J. Turnpike	Exit 5 on N.J. Turnpike; access northbound CR 541 to the New Jersey Turnpike via Hancock Lane
Burlington Township	21.63	34.81	I-295 – Camden, Delaware Memorial Bridge, Trenton	Exits 47A-B on I-295
Burlington	23.84	38.37	US 130 / CR 543 – Bordentown	Northern terminus
1.000 mi = 1.609 km; 1.000 km = 0.621 mi: Tolled

== CR 541 Truck ==
County Route 541 Truck
- Location: Burlington Township–Burlington
- Length: 1.49 mi (2.40 km)
- Existed: 1986–present

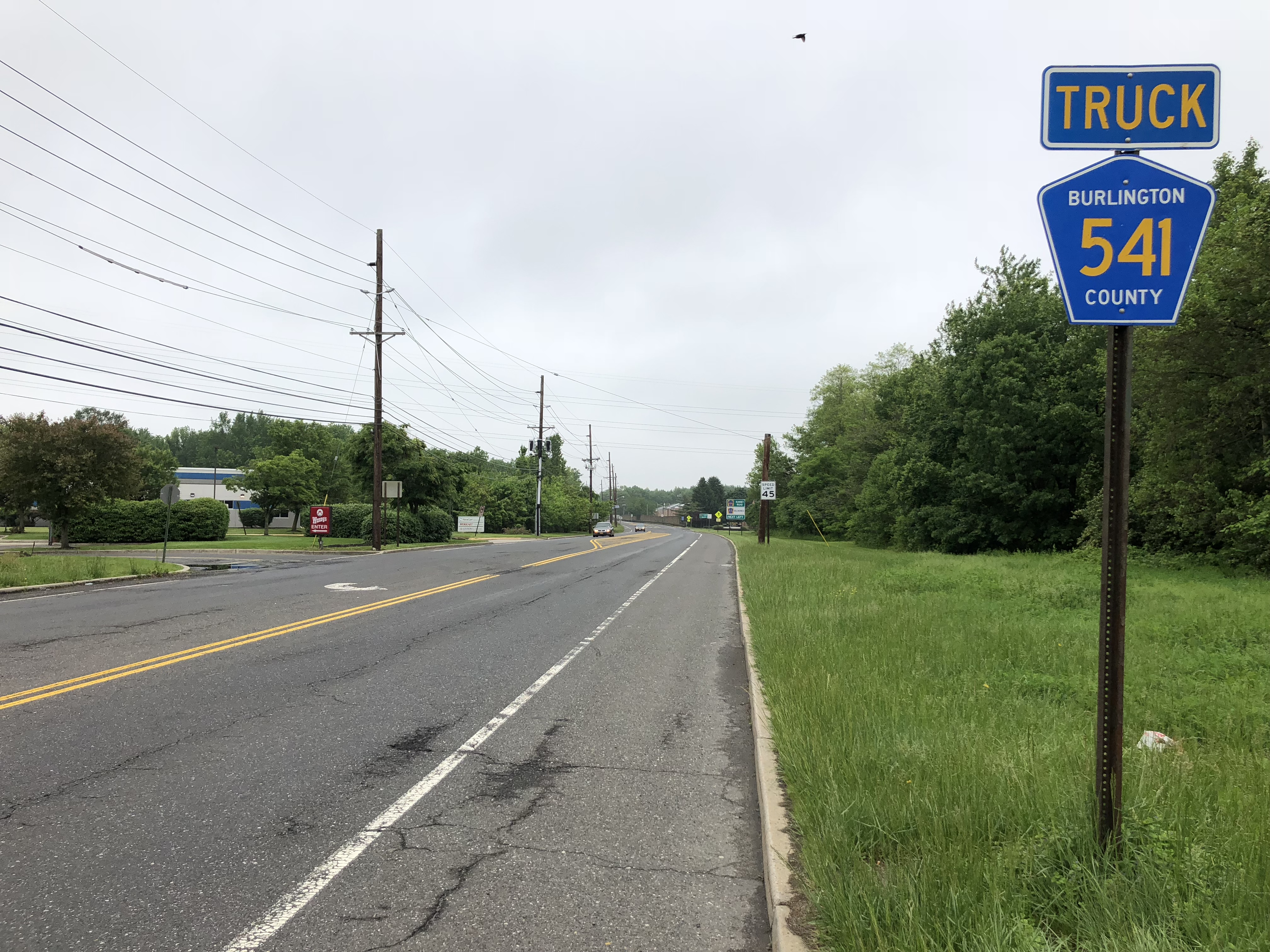
CR 541 Truck northbound past its southern terminus at Cadillac Road in Burlington Township

County Route 541 Truck (CR 541T) is a bypass of a section of CR 541 near Burlington. The route runs along the Burlington Bypass between Cadillac Road in Burlington Township, north to Jacksonville Road (CR 670) in Burlington. The bypass is maintained by Burlington County and its construction was originally funded by the Burlington County Bridge Commission.

The bypass begins at Cadillac Road, just east of CR 541 and an offramp from CR 541 northbound. The two- to three-lane road heads north-northwest between businesses and restaurants. At an apartment complex entrance, a ramp for southbound traffic to connect directly to CR 541 and Sunset Road (CR 634) is present. The road narrows to two lanes where is passes between Burlington Township Middle School and a fire station. Continuing north-northwest on a straight course, CR 541T intersects with Fountain Avenue, crosses into the city limits of Burlington, and ends at a signalized intersection with Jacksonville Road (CR 670). Signage at this intersection indicates that CR 541T continues west along Jacksonville Road (CR 670) to US 130.

CR 541T was constructed on the right-of-way of the former Burlington and Mount Holly Railroad. Construction began on the road in November 1985 and was opened in August 1986. Following completion of the bypass road, trucks were banned on CR 541 in Burlington. The road is maintained by Burlington County.
