= List of highways numbered 534 =

The following highways are numbered 534:

== United States ==
- LA 534
- MD 534 (former)
- SR 534
- PA 534
- PR-534
- FM 534
- SR 534

Preceded by 533	Lists of highways 534	Succeeded by 535
