= Airport Circle =

Airport Circle may refer to the following traffic circles:

- Airport Circle (Newark) in Newark, New Jersey (defunct)
- Airport Circle (Pennsauken) in Pennsauken Township, New Jersey
- Airport Circle (Pomona) in Pomona, New Jersey
