= List of highways numbered 531 =

The following highways are numbered 531.

== Australia ==
- Kiewa Valley Highway

== Canada ==
- Alberta Highway 531
- Highway 531 (Ontario)

== Cuba ==
- Sancti Spíritus–Yaguajay Road (4–531)

== India ==
- National Highway 531 (India)

== Israel ==
- Route 531 (Israel)

== United Kingdom ==
- A531 road

== United States ==
- SR 531
  - SR 531A
- KY 531
- LA 531
- MS 531
- SR 531 (former)
- NM 531
- NY 531
- SR 531
- PA 531
- PR-531
- SC 531 (former)
- FM 531
- SR 531

Preceded by 530	Lists of highways 531	Succeeded by 532
