= List of highways numbered 536 =

Route 536, or Highway 536, may refer to:

== India ==
- National Highway 536 (India)

== United Kingdom ==
- A536 road

== United States ==
- SR 536
- KY 536
- MD 536
- SR 536 (former)
- CR 536
- SR 536
- PA 536
- PR-536
- SR 536

Preceded by 535	Lists of highways 536	Succeeded by 537
