= List of highways numbered 528 =

The following highways are numbered 528:

== Canada ==
- Alberta Highway 528
- Ontario Highway 528
  - Ontario Highway 528A

== United Kingdom ==
- A528 road

== United States ==
- SR 528 / SR 528
- MD 528
- CR 528
- NM 528
- SR 528
- PA 528
- PR-528
- FM 528

Preceded by 527	Lists of highways 528	Succeeded by 529
