= New Jersey Route 38 =

State highway in southern, New Jersey, US

Route 38

Route information
- Maintained by NJDOT
- Length: 19.1 mi (30.7 km)
- Existed: 1927–present

Major junctions
- West end: US 30 / US 130 in Pennsauken
- Route 70 / CR 601 / CR 612 in Pennsauken; Route 41 / Route 73 in Maple Shade; I-295 in Mount Laurel
- East end: US 206 / CR 530 in Southampton

Location
- Country: United States
- State: New Jersey
- Counties: Camden, Burlington

Highway system
- New Jersey State Highway Routes; Interstate; US; State; Scenic Byways
← Route 37	→ Route 39

Route 38 is a state highway in the southern part of the U.S. state of New Jersey serving the Philadelphia metropolitan area. It extends 19.1 mi (30.74 km) from the Airport Circle junction with US 30 and US 130 in Pennsauken, Camden County, east to an intersection of US 206 and South Pemberton Road (CR 530) in Southampton, Burlington County. The entire route is closely parallel to CR 537 located to the north, being only one block away at places. The route is a multilane divided highway for most of its length and passes through commercial development, residential development, and some farmland.

Route 38 was signed in 1927, replacing part of Pre-1927 Route 18, which had run from Camden east to Toms River. Route 38 was originally planned to be a freeway crossing the state of New Jersey, running from Camden east to Wall Township, Monmouth County. The eastern part of this freeway would become part of I-195 in the late 1960s. The freeway routing was then modified to head north of I-195 to Route 18 in Colts Neck but was ultimately canceled by the late 1970s due to environmental and financial concerns. Route 138 was originally numbered as a segment of Route 38, but was renumbered by the 1990s when it became apparent the freeway would not be completed.

== Route description ==
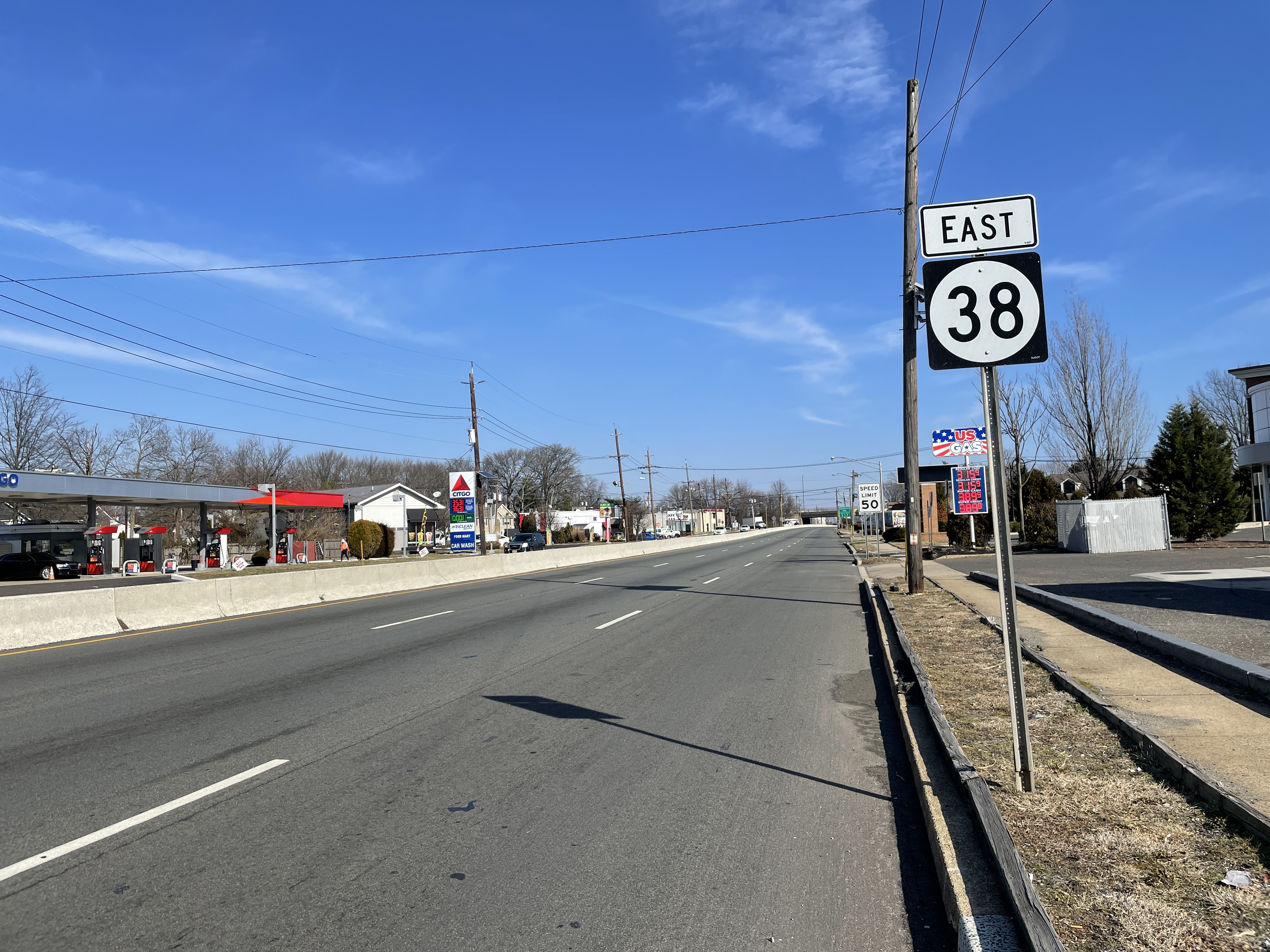
Route 38 eastbound past CR 626 in Cherry Hill

Route 38 begins at the Airport Circle intersection of US 30, US 130, and Kaighns Avenue (CR 607) in Pennsauken, Camden County, heading east on Kaighns Avenue. It comes to a partial cloverleaf interchange with the western terminus of Route 70 that also connects to Marlton Pike (CR 601) and Browning Road (CR 612), which replaced the Browning Road Traffic Circle. A six–lane divided highway separated by a jersey barrier, it proceeds eastward, crossing into Cherry Hill, where it heads through commercial development. Route 38 features cloverleaf interchanges with Cuthbert Boulevard (CR 636) and Haddonfield Road (CR 644), passing under NJ Transit's Atlantic City Line between the two interchanges. Past the interchange with Haddonfield Road (CR 644), Route 38 heads past the Cherry Hill Mall, located on the north side of the road. It proceeds through the Church Road Circle, where it crosses the intersection of Church Road (CR 616) and Coles Avenue/Cooper Landing Road (CR 627).

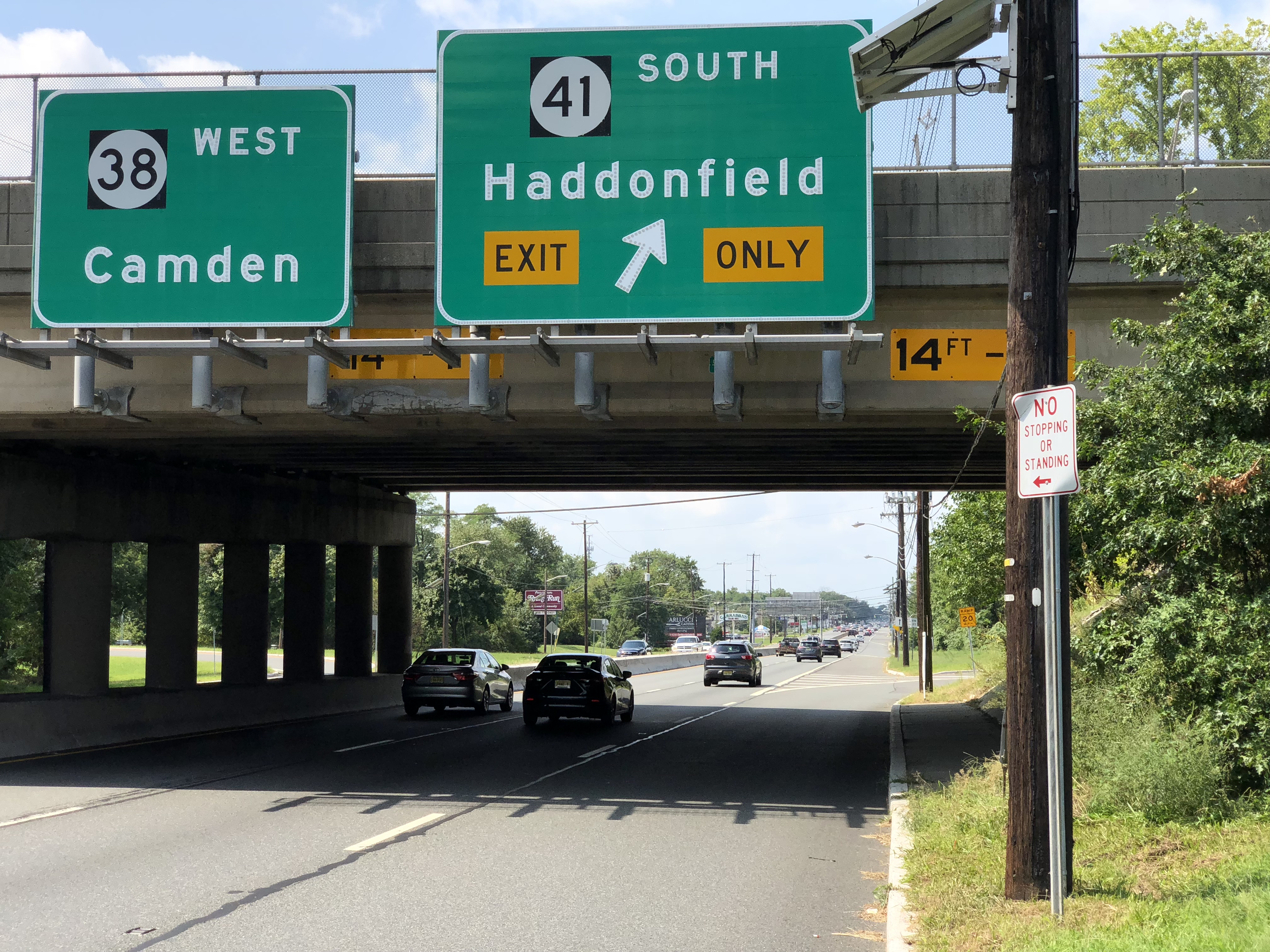
Route 38 westbound at Route 41 interchange in Maple Shade Township

Route 38 crosses the South Branch of the Pennsauken Creek into Maple Shade in Burlington County. The route reaches a cloverleaf interchange with Route 41 before it has an interchange with Route 73 that also has access to Old Kings Highway. The Route 38-41-73 interchange complex replaced a dangerous and congested 6-way traffic circle. The route then crosses the intersection of Lenola Road (CR 608) into Moorestown, where it becomes unnamed. Route 38 travels by the Moorestown Mall located to the south before passing by the Strawbridge Lake Park located to the north, where it crosses the intersection of Church Street (CR 607) and then Mt Laurel Road (CR 603). It enters Mount Laurel, where it intersects with Marter Avenue (CR 615) before meeting I-295 at a partial cloverleaf interchange and passing over the New Jersey Turnpike without access.

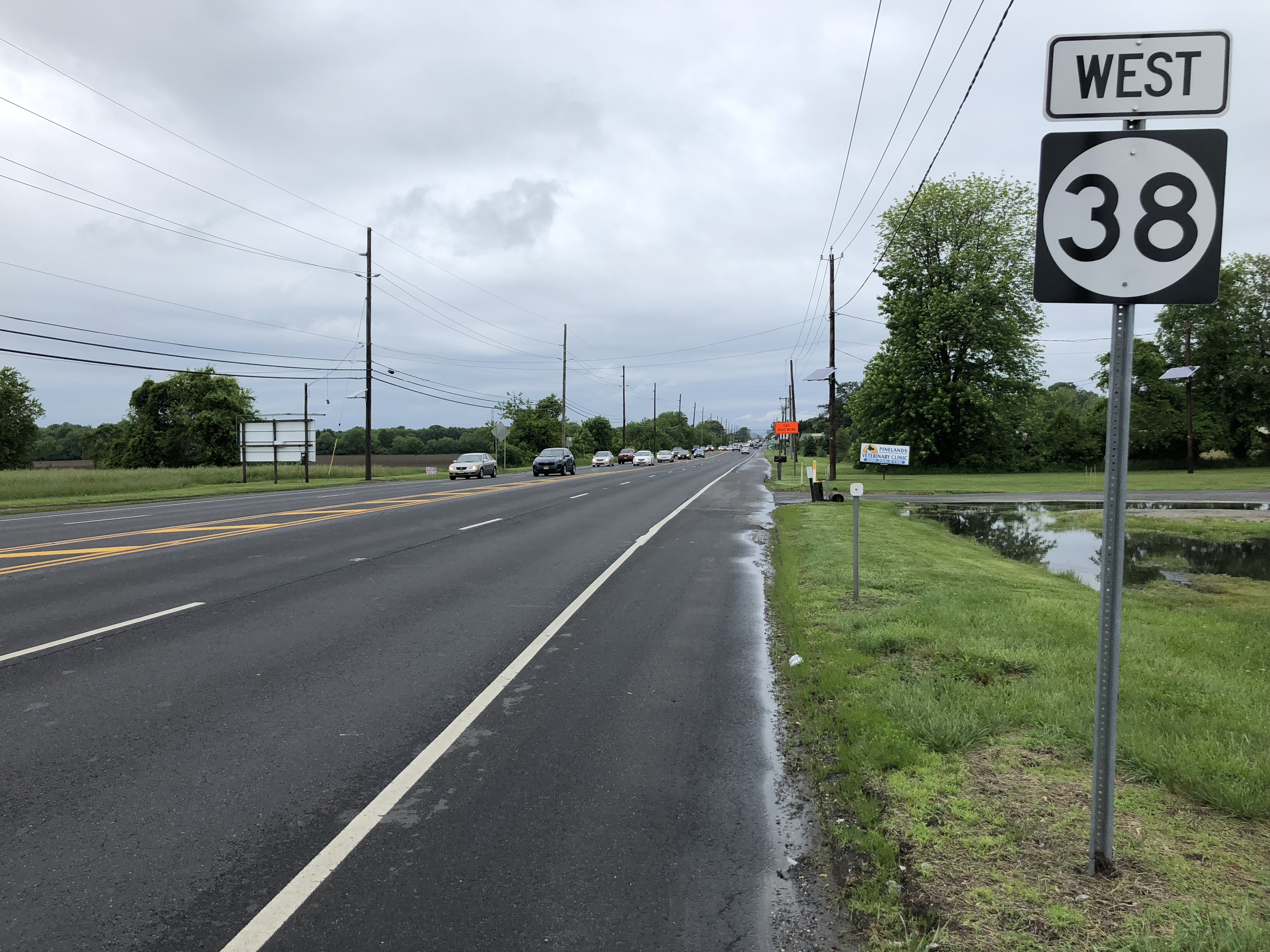
View west at the east end of Route 38 at US 206 and CR 530 in Southampton Township

It then continues east, heading into more residential areas and passing south of Rowan College at Burlington County. Route 38 intersects many roads with jughandles, including Hartford Road (CR 686), Ark Road (CR 635), and Masonville–Fostertown Road (CR 636) crossing into Hainesport, where it further intersects with Hainesport–Mount Laurel Road (CR 674), Creek Road (CR 636) without a traffic light, and Lumberton Avenue (CR 641). The route then crosses the South Branch of the Rancocas Creek before entering Lumberton, where the road intersects with Mt Holly Bypass (CR 541). Route 38 runs through the southern part of the Mount Holly area, intersecting with Madison Avenue/Main Street (CR 691), the former alignment of CR 541. It crosses into Mount Holly at the intersection of Pine Street/Eayrestown Road (CR 612). Past this intersection, Route 38 eventually becomes an undivided highway and then reenters Lumberton. The route then heads into farmland and crosses into Southampton at the intersection of Smithville Road (CR 684). Route 38 ends at the intersection of US 206, where the road continues east on South Pemberton Road (CR 530).

== History ==
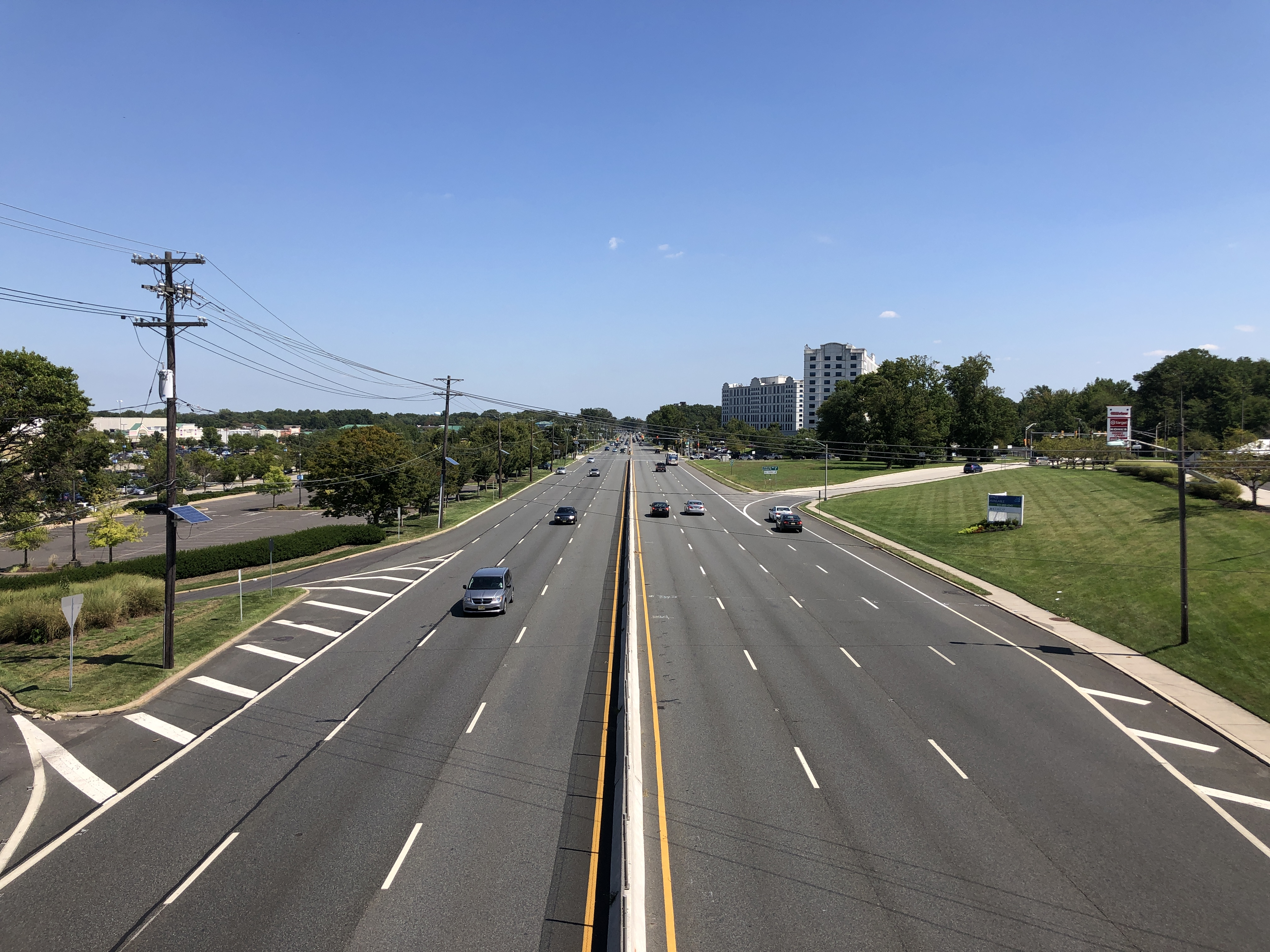
Route 38 in Cherry Hill looking east

Prior to 1927, the route was a part of Pre-1927 Route 18, which was legislated in 1923 to run from Camden to Toms River. In the 1927 New Jersey state highway renumbering, Route 38 was legislated to run along the route from Route 25 (now U.S. Route 130) in Pennsauken east to Route 39 (now US 206) in Eastampton.

In 1938, Route 38 was legislated to extend from East Hampton to Route 4N (now Route 71) in Wall Township, Monmouth County. A section of this was built, running between Route 34 and Route 35 in Wall Township. The Route 38 freeway was then planned in 1961 to connect these two sections of Route 38. It was to run from I-680 (now I-676) in Camden east to the planned Route 35 freeway (now Route 18) in Wall Township, providing a direct freeway connection between the Philadelphia metropolitan area and the northern portions of the Jersey Shore. The route of the freeway was to run east from the Ben Franklin Bridge, paralleling US 30 and then Route 70. It would then have run parallel to the current alignment of Route 38 through the Mount Holly area and then travel along the northern border of the Fort Dix Military Reservation to Jackson, Ocean County, where it would then follow the present alignment of I-195 to Wall Township. In the late 1960s, the eastern part of the Route 38 freeway became part of the proposed I-195.

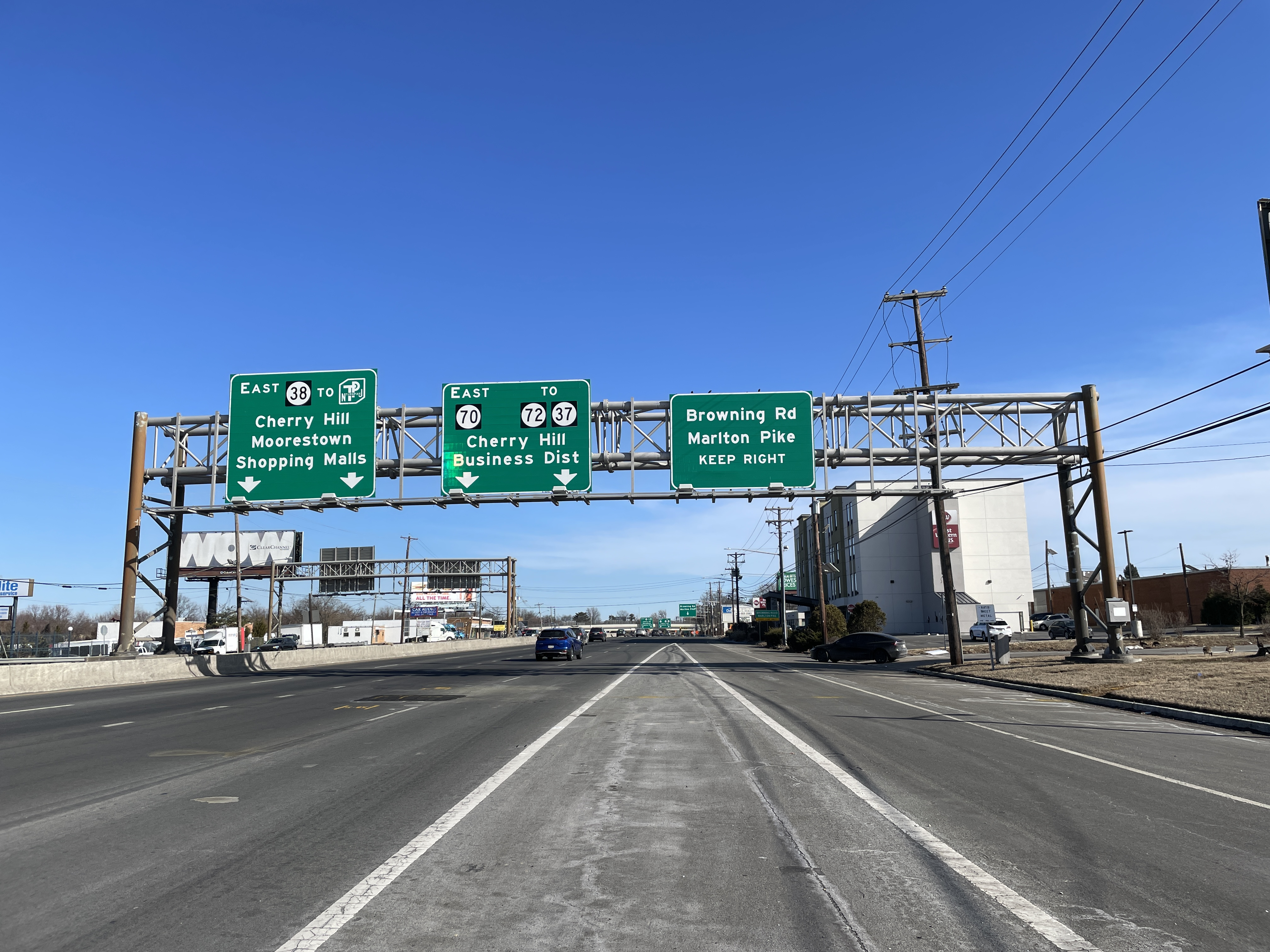
Route 38 eastbound past US 30/US 130 at the Airport Circle in Pennsauken Township

In 1969, it was estimated the Route 38 freeway between I-295 in Cherry Hill and I-195 in Jackson would cost $60 million and be completed by 1985. The route of the freeway was revised in 1972 to head north of I-195 to Route 18 in Colts Neck, intersecting with Route 33 in Freehold Township. The western terminus was also moved to Mount Laurel, where it was to connect to the New Jersey Turnpike and Route 90, which was projected to extend to the New Jersey Turnpike. It was estimated that this routing of the Route 38 freeway would cost $101 million. However, due to environmental concerns of the route passing through the Pine Barrens and financial troubles, the freeway was canceled by the end of the 1970s. The orphaned eastern section of Route 38 in Monmouth County was renumbered to Route 138 on July 29, 1988.

The portion of Route 38 extending 2.39 miles (3.85 km) from the curve east of Pine Street east to US 206 was county maintained as part of CR 530 until June 30, 1986, when jurisdiction of the route was transferred from Burlington County.

== Major intersections ==
County	Location	mi	km	Destinations	Notes
Camden	Pennsauken Township	0.0	0.0	US 30 / US 130 – Camden, B Franklin Br, Trenton	Airport Circle; western terminus
Camden	Pennsauken Township	0.6	0.97	Route 70 east to Route 72 / Route 37 – Cherry Hill Business Dist Marlton Pike/Browning Rd – Merchantville	Partial cloverleaf interchange; western terminus of Route 70; access via CR 601/CR 612
Camden	Cherry Hill	1.5	2.4	Cuthbert Blvd – Merchantville, Oaklyn	Cloverleaf interchange; access via CR 636
Camden	Cherry Hill	2.8	4.5	Haddonfield Rd – Haddonfield, Pennsauken	Cloverleaf interchange; access via CR 644
Burlington	Maple Shade Township	5.2	8.4	Route 41 to Route 73 north – Haddonfield, Palmyra, Tacony Br	Partial cloverleaf interchange; no northbound access to Route 38 west
Burlington	Maple Shade Township	5.5	8.9	Route 73 south to N.J. Turnpike – Marlton	No westbound exit
Burlington	Maple Shade Township	5.5	8.9	Route 73 north – Palmyra, Tacony Br	No eastbound exit
Burlington	Mount Laurel	9.5	15.3	I-295 south – Del Mem Br	No eastbound exit; Exits 40A-B (I-295)
Burlington	Mount Laurel	9.5	15.3	I-295 north – Trenton	Eastbound exit and westbound entrance; Exits 40A-B (I-295)
Burlington	Lumberton	15.3	24.6	CR 541 (Mt Holly Bypass) to N.J. Turnpike north – Mt. Holly, Burlington, Lumberton, Medford	
Burlington	Southampton Township	19.1	30.7	US 206 to A.C. Expressway – Trenton, Hammonton CR 530 east (S Pemberton Rd)	Eastern terminus; western terminus of CR 530
1.000 mi = 1.609 km; 1.000 km = 0.621 mi: Incomplete access
