= List of highways numbered 533 =

The following highways are numbered 533:

== Canada ==
- Ontario Highway 533

== United States ==
- SR 533
- LA 533
- MD 533
- NM 533
- SR 533
- PA 533
- PR-533
- FM 533

Preceded by 532	Lists of highways 533	Succeeded by 534
