= List of highways numbered 532 =

The following highways are numbered 532:

== Canada ==
- Alberta Highway 532
- Manitoba Provincial Road 532
- Ontario Highway 532

== India ==
- National Highway 532 (India)

== United States ==
- SR 532
- CR 532
- SR 532
- PA 532
- PR-532
- SR 532

Preceded by 531	Lists of highways 532	Succeeded by 533
