= County Route 542 (New Jersey) =

County highway in New Jersey, U.S.

County Route 542
- CR 542 highlighted in red

Route information
- Length: 20.57 mi (33.10 km)
- Tourist routes: Pine Barrens Byway

Major junctions
- West end: Route 54 in Hammonton
- US 30 in Hammonton; CR 563 in Washington Township
- East end: US 9 in Bass River Township

Location
- Country: United States
- State: New Jersey
- Counties: Atlantic, Burlington

Highway system
- County routes in New Jersey; 500-series routes
← CR 541	→ CR 543

County Route 542 (CR 542) is a county highway in the U.S. state of New Jersey. The highway extends 20.57 miles (33.10 km) from Route 54 in Hammonton to U.S. Route 9 (US 9) in Bass River Township.

== Route description ==
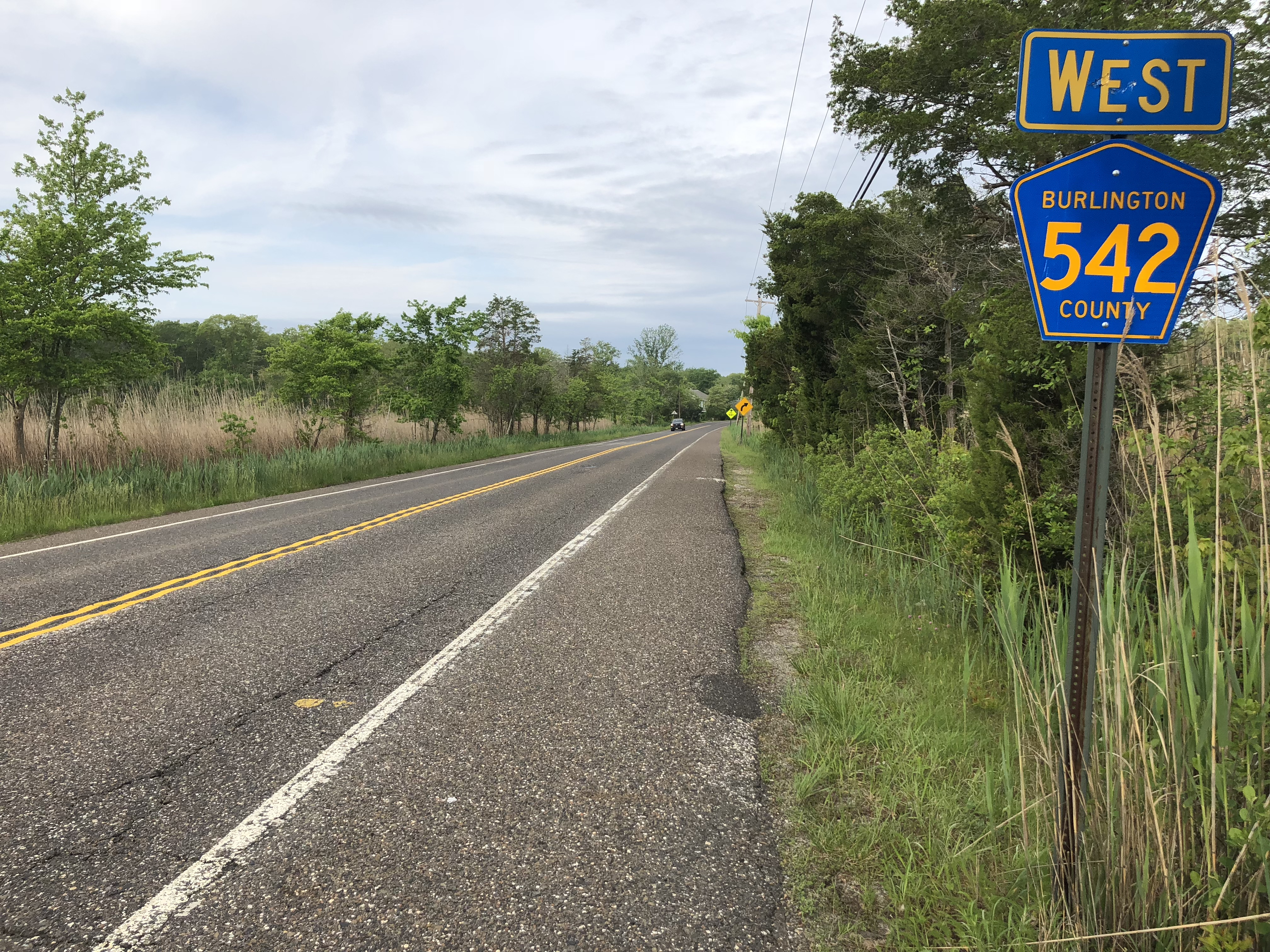
View west along CR 542 just west of the Wading River in Washington Township, Burlington County

CR 542 begins at an intersection with Route 54 in Hammonton, Atlantic County, heading east on two-lane undivided Central Avenue. The road passes through wooded residential areas, intersecting CR 724 and CR 680. Near Atlanticare–Kessler Memorial Hospital, the route intersects US 30, at which point CR 542 turns south for a brief concurrency on four-lane undivided White Horse Pike. Near Hammonton Lake, CR 542 splits from US 30 by heading east on two-lane undivided Hammonton–Pleasant Mills Road, soon intersecting CR 679. The road continues through a mix of homes and farms, turning northeast and entering Mullica Township, where CR 542 curves east again and passes through woods as it reaches a junction with CR 693. From this point, the route continues back into agricultural areas with some homes, meeting CR 658. CR 542 turns northeast and enters the Wharton State Forest, a part of the Pine Barrens. After passing to the north of Nescochague Lake, the road reaches the CR 623 junction.

Upon crossing the Mullica River, CR 542 crosses into Washington Township in Burlington County and becomes Hammonton Road. The road passes to the south of Batsto Village and makes a turn southeast into dense forests, running a short distance to the north of the Mullica River. After a turn to the east, the route comes to an intersection with CR 651 before coming to a brief concurrency with CR 563. Past this point, the road continues through rural areas for several miles, with a junction at CR 652. CR 542 enters marshland as it crosses the Wading River on a drawbridge into Bass River Township. A short distance later, the road meets CR 653 and turns southeast, running a short distance east of the Wading River through areas of forests and marshland. CR 542 turns east and comes to its eastern terminus at US 9 in the community of New Gretna.

== Major intersections ==
County	Location	mi	km	Destinations	Notes
Atlantic	Hammonton	0.00	0.00	Route 54 (12th Street) to A.C. Expressway	Western terminus
Atlantic	Hammonton	1.68	2.70	US 30 west (White Horse Pike) – Camden	West end of US 30 overlap
Atlantic	Hammonton	1.76	2.83	US 30 east (White Horse Pike) – Atlantic City	East end of US 30 overlap
Burlington	Washington Township	13.00	20.92	CR 563 south (Green Bank Road)	West end of CR 563 overlap
Burlington	Washington Township	13.10	21.08	CR 563 north (Jenkins Road) – Jenkins, Chatsworth	East end of CR 563 overlap
Burlington	Bass River Township	20.57	33.10	US 9 to G.S. Parkway – Tuckerton, Cape May	Eastern terminus
1.000 mi = 1.609 km; 1.000 km = 0.621 mi: Concurrency terminus
