= County Route 530 (New Jersey) =

County highway in New Jersey, U.S.

County Route 530
- CR 530 highlighted in red

Route information
- Length: 31.21 mi (50.23 km)

Major junctions
- West end: US 206 / Route 38 in Southampton Township
- CR 545 in Pemberton Township; Route 70 in Pemberton Township; CR 539 in Manchester Township; US 9 / G.S. Parkway in South Toms River
- East end: Route 166 in Toms River

Location
- Country: United States
- State: New Jersey
- Counties: Burlington, Ocean

Highway system
- County routes in New Jersey; 500-series routes
← CR 529	→ CR 531

County Route 530 (CR 530) is a county highway in the U.S. state of New Jersey. The highway extends 31.21 miles (50.23 km) from the intersection of U.S. Route 206 and Route 38 in Southampton Township to Water Street (Route 166) in Toms River.

== Route description ==
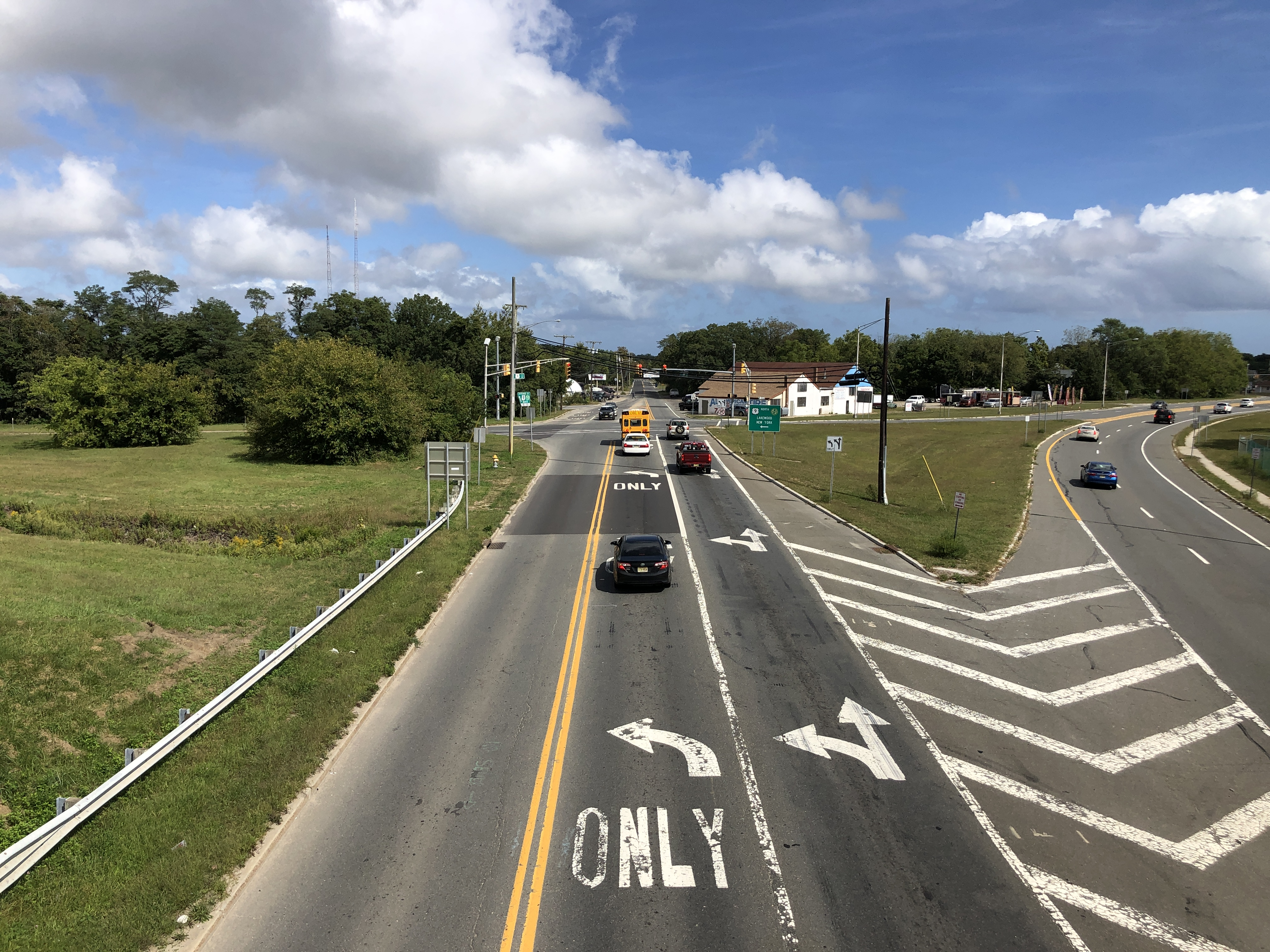
View eastbound along CR 530 from the Garden State Parkway in South Toms River

CR 530 begins at an intersection of Route 38 and U.S. Route 206 in Southampton, Burlington County, heading east on four-lane undivided Pemberton Road. West of U.S. Route 206, the road becomes Route 38. From here, the route passes woods and farms with some homes and businesses. The road crosses into Pemberton Township before continuing into Pemberton, at which point CR 530 becomes Hampton Street. Upon crossing CR 616, the route becomes the two-lane Pemberton By-Pass and intersects CR 644, heading southeast into forested areas and crossing back into Pemberton Township. The road turns north and joins CR 687, crossing the Rancocas Creek. The bypass ends at Pemberton-Browns Mills Road, at which point CR 687 turns west and CR 530 continues to the east. The route heads through agricultural areas with some development, coming to a junction with CR 646. From here, the road enters forested areas of the New Jersey Pine Barrens with a few homes before turning northeast and reaching the community of Browns Mills. In this area, CR 530 passes businesses and makes a turn to the southeast at a junction with CR 667 and CR 669. The road comes to the southern terminus of CR 545, with the name becoming Lakehurst Road, and passes Mirror Lake. After the CR 645 junction, CR 530 passes more rural areas of homes, with the road curving more to the east. After passing some cranberry bogs, CR 530 meets Route 70 and heads east concurrent with that route.

A short distance later, the two routes enter Manchester Township in Ocean County and continue east through a tract of the Brendan T. Byrne State Forest within the Pine Barrens as well as a corner of the Fort Dix Military Reservation. The road eventually reaches the community of Whiting, where it passes commercial development at the intersection with CR 539. Here, CR 530 turns south to follow CR 539 on Allentown-Whiting Road, splitting from that route a short distance later by turning east onto Lacey Road. The road heads into a mix of forests and residential subdivisions, crossing a New Jersey Seashore Lines railroad line before intersecting CR 615 and CR 614. At the intersection with the latter, CR 530 becomes Keswick Road and passes near more developed areas before entering more rural areas of the Pine Barrens and turning southeast. The road enters Berkeley Township, intersecting CR 39 before reaching the CR 618 junction. At this junction, CR 530 turns northeast onto Dover Road and continues for a distance before coming into South Toms River. At this point, the road enters residential areas and intersects CR 619 prior to coming to an interchange with the Garden State Parkway/U.S. Route 9. Here, CR 530 has access to and from the northbound direction of the Garden State Parkway/U.S. Route 9 and crosses the northbound direction of U.S. Route 9 at an at-grade intersection and has a brief concurrency with southbound U.S. Route 9 from the point it exits the Garden State Parkway. A short distance later, the route makes a turn north onto South Main Street and passes between the Toms River to the west and woods to the east. CR 530 enters industrial areas before reaching its eastern terminus at the Route 166 intersection.

== Major intersections ==
County	Location	mi	km	Destinations	Notes
Burlington	Southampton Township	0.00	0.00	US 206 to N.J. Turnpike – Hammonton, Trenton Route 38 west – Mount Holly, Camden	Eastern terminus of Route 38
Burlington	Pemberton Township	8.78	14.13	CR 545 north (Trenton Road)	Southern terminus of CR 545
Burlington	Pemberton Township	14.28	22.98	Route 70 west – Camden	West end of Route 70 overlap
Ocean	Manchester Township	19.41	31.24	Route 70 east – Lakehurst CR 539 north (Allentown Whiting Road) – New Egypt, Trenton	East end of Route 70 overlap, west end of CR 539 overlap
Ocean	Manchester Township	19.58	31.51	CR 539 south	East end of CR 539 overlap
Ocean	South Toms River	30.35– 30.43	48.84– 48.97	US 9 / G.S. Parkway – Beachwood, Lakewood Township, New York City	Exit 80 (GSP)
Ocean	Toms River	31.21	50.23	Route 166 (Herflicker Boulevard / Main Street)	
1.000 mi = 1.609 km; 1.000 km = 0.621 mi: Concurrency terminus
