= Marlton Circle =

Former roundabout in Evesham Township, New Jersey

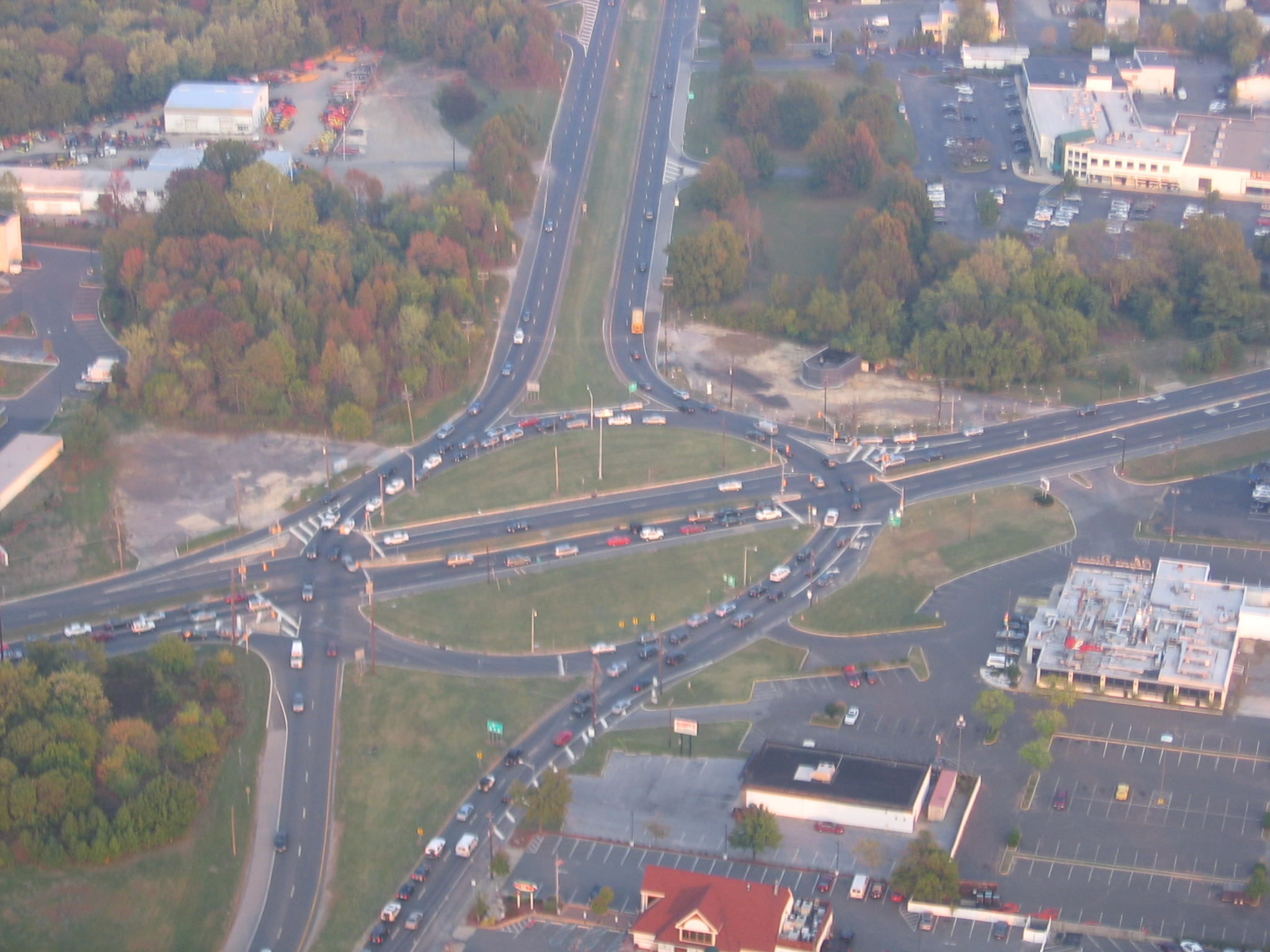
- Marlton Circle in 2007, before construction started on the replacement interchange

Location
- Marlton, New Jersey
- Coordinates: 39.8939°N 74.9275°W
- Roads at junction: Route 70; Route 73

Construction
- Type: Traffic circle

The Marlton Circle was a traffic circle in the Marlton section of Evesham Township, New Jersey, located at the intersection of Route 70 and Route 73. The highways connecting through the circle provided access to drivers navigating to and between the New Jersey Turnpike, the Tacony-Palmyra Bridge and points on the Jersey Shore.

== History ==
For years after the construction of the one-lane Marlton Circle in the 1940s, the area was a sparsely populated farming town. While the roads in the area had long been lightly traveled, the population of Evesham Township had doubled since the 1970s and the increased housing and commercial density placed greater traffic stress on the Marlton Circle. In the summer of 1974, the circle was modified when Route 73 was cut through and traffic signals were installed. Congestion has plagued this intersection for years, routinely backing up as far as a mile on summer afternoons. A motorist described the interchange as being like an airport in a resident neighborhood, saying it's "not a traffic circle, it's a non-traffic circle".

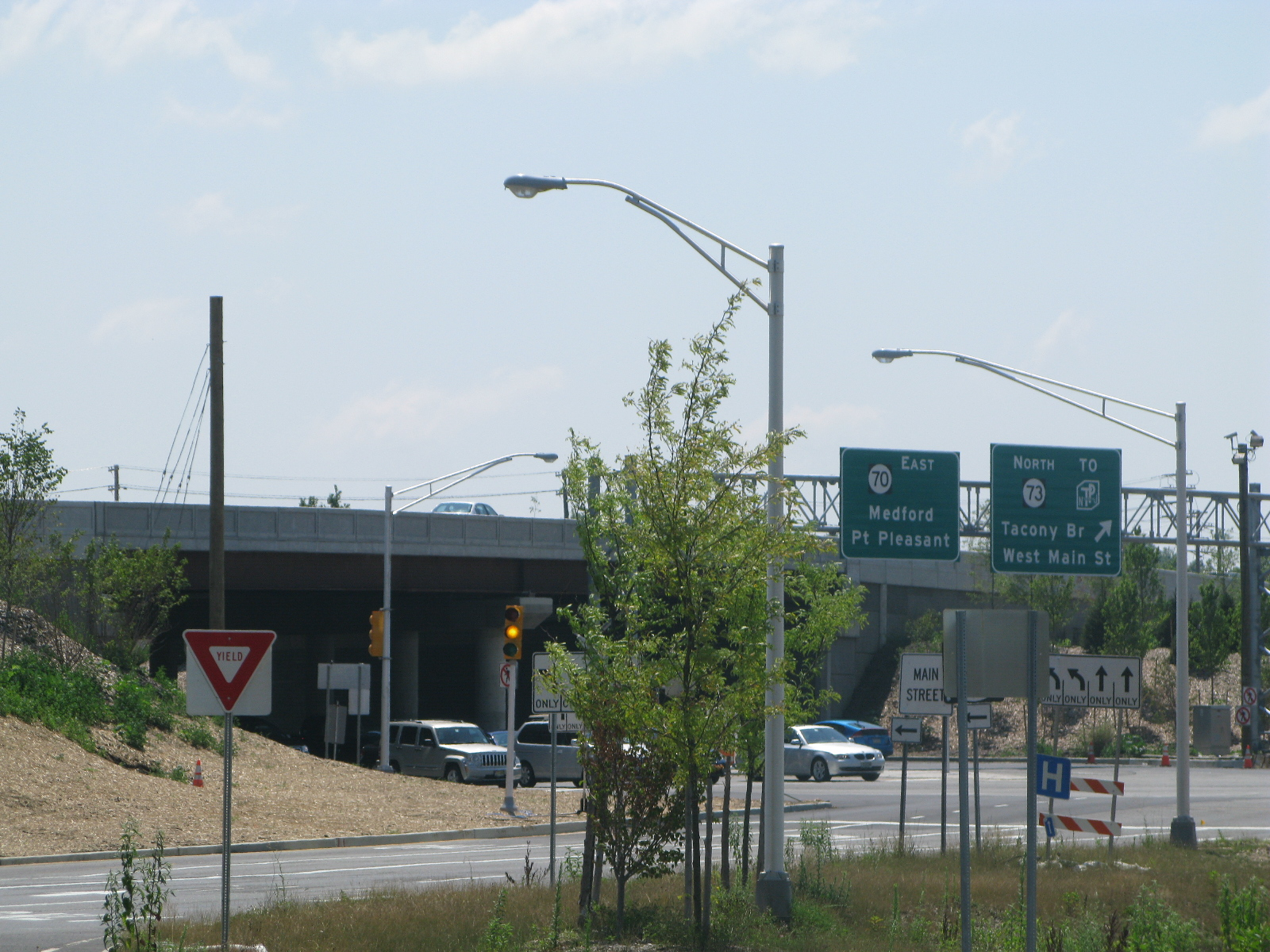
Current Marlton Circle interchange

A plan to eliminate the circle was announced in 2002 as part of a $26 million project that would address congestion at the circle, which was at the time "the third most dangerous intersection in the state". By 2008, plans to eliminate the circle, described by The Philadelphia Inquirer as "one of the most dangerous intersections in South Jersey", and replace it with an overpass over Route 70 were continuing, a task made more difficult by the daily traffic volume of 90,000 vehicles passing through the circle. Construction broke ground on April 8, 2009.

On May 2, 2010, new traffic patterns were put into effect on Route 70 and 73, and the circle was closed off to traffic and replaced with a temporary at-grade intersection until the overpass was completed. The circle elimination project also made improvements and new traffic patterns to local roads nearby, including the intersections of Old Marlton Pike (CR 600), East Main Street (CR 620) and Centre Boulevard. New service roads were constructed to provide access for the several businesses in the area, as well as installing new signage and new traffic signals where needed.

On June 25, 2011, the circle was officially eliminated as the Route 73 southbound overpass opened to traffic. The northbound lanes began using the new bridge in March 2011. The entire project, including signage, landscaping, pavement resurfacing, road improvements, and installation of new traffic signals was completed in November 2011. The total cost of the project was $33 million.

== Maps ==
Map of intersection c. 2008 before reconstruction

Map of current interchange

== Olga's Diner ==
Olga's Diner, which Peter Genovese (writer for The Star-Ledger) describes as "the queen of South Jersey diners", was located at the Marlton Circle for four decades. The diner, originally located at the junction of Sixth and Federal Streets in Camden, opened in 1946 and was originally called Mom and Pop's. It became Olga's Diner when it moved to a location across the street in 1951; and finally moved to the Marlton Circle in 1960. It was put up for sale in 2005, and finally closed in December 2008. In November 2019, a new Olga's location opened on Route 73, less than a half mile from the former Marlton Circle.
