= New Jersey Route 70 =

Highway in New Jersey

Route 70
- Marlton Pike

Route information
- Maintained by NJDOT
- Length: 59.8 mi (96.2 km)
- Existed: January 1, 1953–present

Major junctions
- West end: Route 38 in Pennsauken
- I-295 in Cherry Hill; Route 73 in Evesham Township; US 206 in Southampton; Route 72 in Woodland Township; Route 37 in Lakehurst; US 9 in Toms River; G.S. Parkway in Lakewood
- East end: Route 34 / Route 35 in Wall Township

Location
- Country: United States
- State: New Jersey
- Counties: Camden, Burlington, Ocean, Monmouth

Highway system
- New Jersey State Highway Routes; Interstate; US; State; Scenic Byways
| ← Route 69 | → Route 71 |
| ← US 40 | Route 40 | → Route 41 |

Route 70 is a state highway located in the U.S. state of New Jersey. It extends 59.8 mi (96.24 km) from an interchange with Route 38 in Pennsauken, Camden County, east to an intersection with Route 34 and Route 35 in Wall Township, Monmouth County. Route 70 cuts across the middle of the state as a two-lane highway through the Pine Barrens in Burlington and Ocean counties. A popular truck route, it provides access between the Philadelphia metropolitan area and the Jersey Shore resorts, particularly Long Beach Island by way of Route 72. It is also a congested commercial route within Philadelphia's New Jersey suburbs. The western section in Cherry Hill and Marlton is a four- to eight-lane divided highway that serves as a major suburban arterial and is locally known as Marlton Pike. There has been construction on the road in Pennsauken, Cherry Hill, and Evesham, starting in 2023 with expected completion in 2026.The eastern section in Monmouth and Ocean counties is also a multilane divided highway that runs through suburban areas.

The portion of the current route between Whitesbog and Lakehurst became a part of pre-1927 Route 18 in 1923. In 1927, Route 40 was legislated to run from Camden to Lakewood; the termini were eventually moved to the Airport Circle in Pennsauken and the Laurelton Circle in Brick. Route 40 became Route 70 in 1953 in order to avoid conflicting with US 40; in addition, the western terminus was cut back to its current location to avoid a concurrency with Route 38 and the eastern terminus was moved to the Brielle Circle, replacing a portion of Route 34 between the Laurelton Circle and the Brielle Circle.

== Route description ==
=== Camden and Burlington counties ===
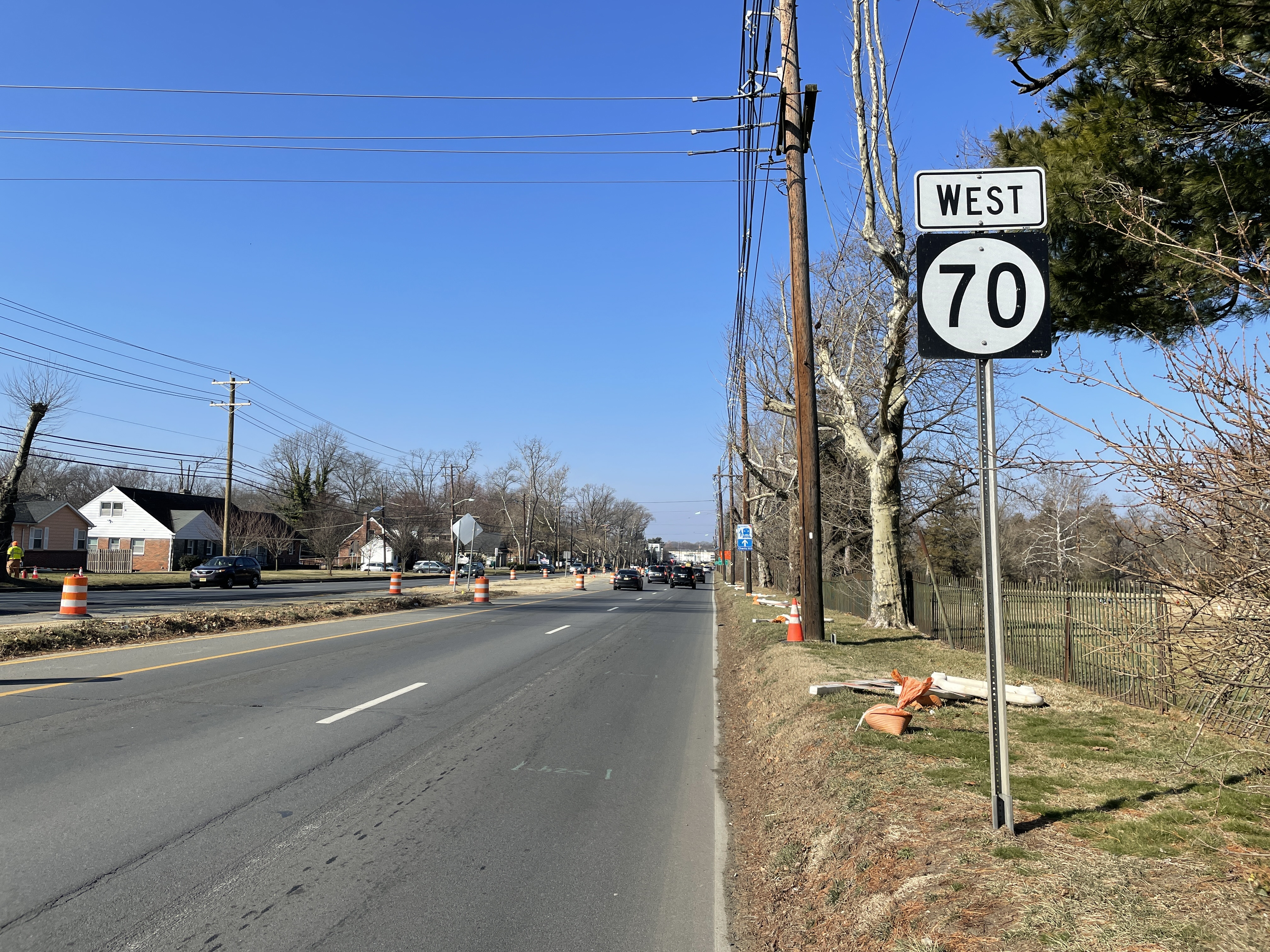
Route 70 westbound past CR 627 in Cherry Hill

Route 70 begins at an interchange with Route 38, Marlton Pike (CR 601), and Browning Road (CR 612) in Pennsauken, Camden County. From this interchange, it heads to the southeast on Marlton Pike, a six-lane divided highway that runs through suburban residential and commercial areas. The road is also officially called the John Davison Rockefeller Memorial Highway for its entire length after John D. Rockefeller. The road enters Cherry Hill and comes to a cloverleaf interchange with Cuthbert Boulevard (CR 636) before crossing under NJ Transit's Atlantic City Line, a short distance to the south of the Cherry Hill Station. In this area, Route 70 passes to the south of a retail and residential development at the former site of the Garden State Park Racetrack before crossing the intersection of Grove Street/Haddonfield Road (CR 644). Past this intersection, the route narrows to four lanes and turns more to the east as it comes to the Ellisburg area. In Ellisburg, it has an intersection of Kings Highway (Route 41/CR 573) and Brace Road (Route 154). The road runs through more suburban areas as it encounters I-295 at a cloverleaf interchange. A short distance past I-295, Route 70 passes over the New Jersey Turnpike without an interchange before widening into an eight-lane highway and continuing east to the intersections of Greentree Road (CR 674) and Springdale Road (CR 673). Following the intersection of Springdale Road (CR 673), the road narrows back to four lanes before it encounters the intersection of CR 600, a former alignment of the road known as Old Marlton Pike.

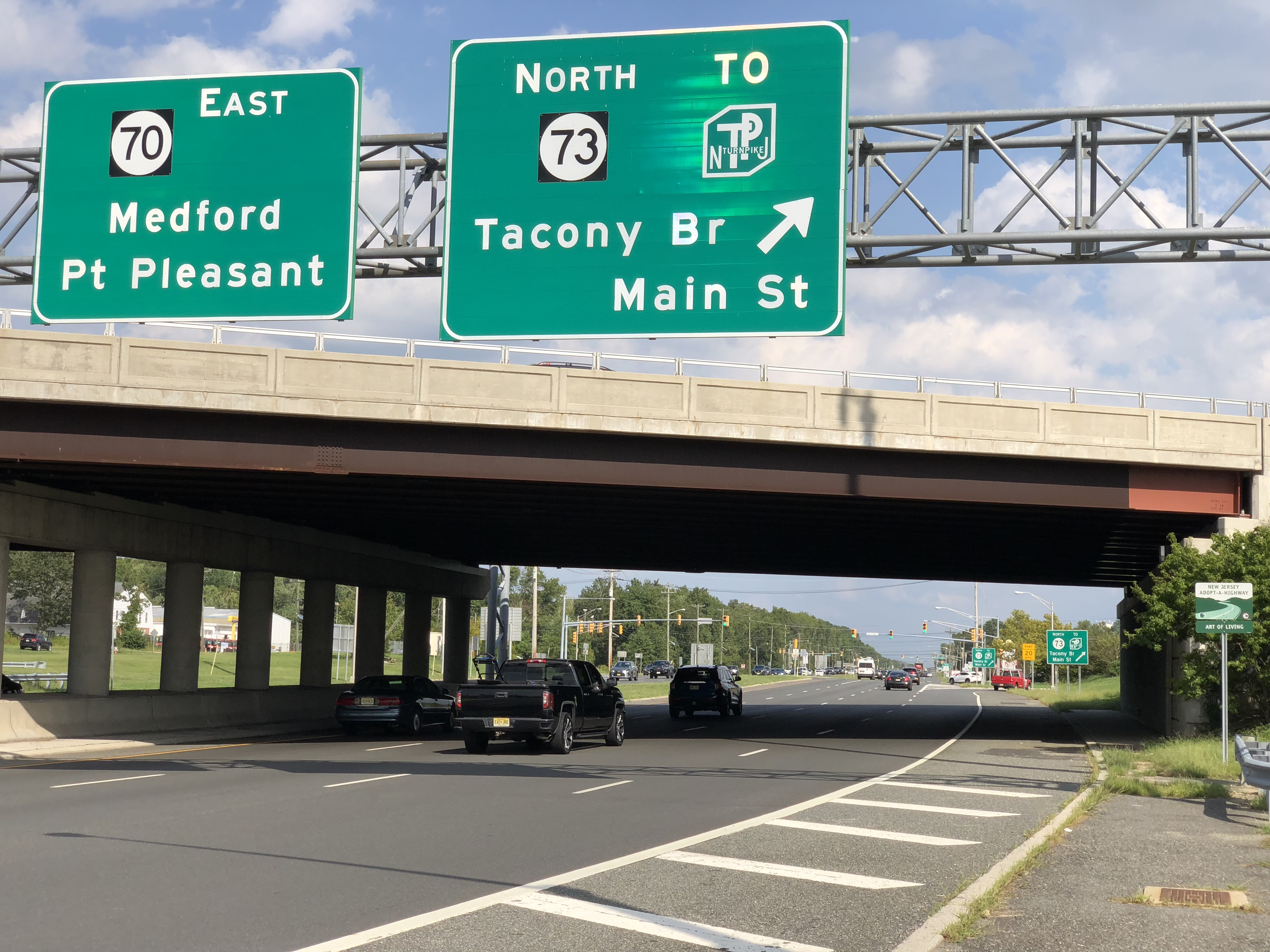
Route 70 eastbound at the interchange with Route 73 in Marlton, the former location of the Marlton Circle

Route 70 crosses the Pennsauken Creek into Evesham Township in Burlington County, running east through more commercial areas within the Marlton section of the township. A short distance later, the route intersects with Route 73 at a partial cloverleaf interchange that was formerly the Marlton Circle. After this interchange, the road heads east passing through some more commercial areas and then into residential neighborhoods that are separated from the road by trees, narrowing into a two-lane undivided road. It continues into a mix of suburban development and rural woods and farms as it crosses into Medford, coming to a crossroads with Medford–Evesboro Road (CR 618). From this intersection, Route 70 continues east through the Medford area, passing a couple of shopping centers before crossing the intersection of North Main Street/Medford–Mt Holly Road (CR 541). After the intersection of North Main Street/Medford–Mt Holly Road (CR 541), the route leaves the suburban development and runs through a mix of woodland and farmland with occasional homes. It enters Southampton, where the road enters more wooded surroundings before coming to US 206 at the Red Lion Circle.

Past here, Route 70 loses Marlton Pike name and continues east into the heavily wooded Pine Barrens. It passes to the south of the Leisuretowne retirement village before entering predominantly rural areas, with two fire lanes paralleling the road on either side. Route 70 eventually turns slightly to the northeast and forms the border between Southampton to the north and Woodland Township to the south. Along this borderline, the route comes to the Four Mile Circle, where it intersects with Route 72 as well as Magnolia Road (CR 644) and Four Mile Road (CR 646). Past the traffic circle, Route 70 becomes the border between Pemberton Township to the north and Woodland Township to the south. The road passes to the south of the wooded Presidential Lakes Estates residential development before turning northeast through more of the Pine Barrens entirely within Pemberton Township. The road passes near some cranberry bogs before intersecting with Lakehurst Road (CR 530). At this intersection, CR 530 heads east concurrently with Route 70.

=== Ocean and Monmouth counties ===
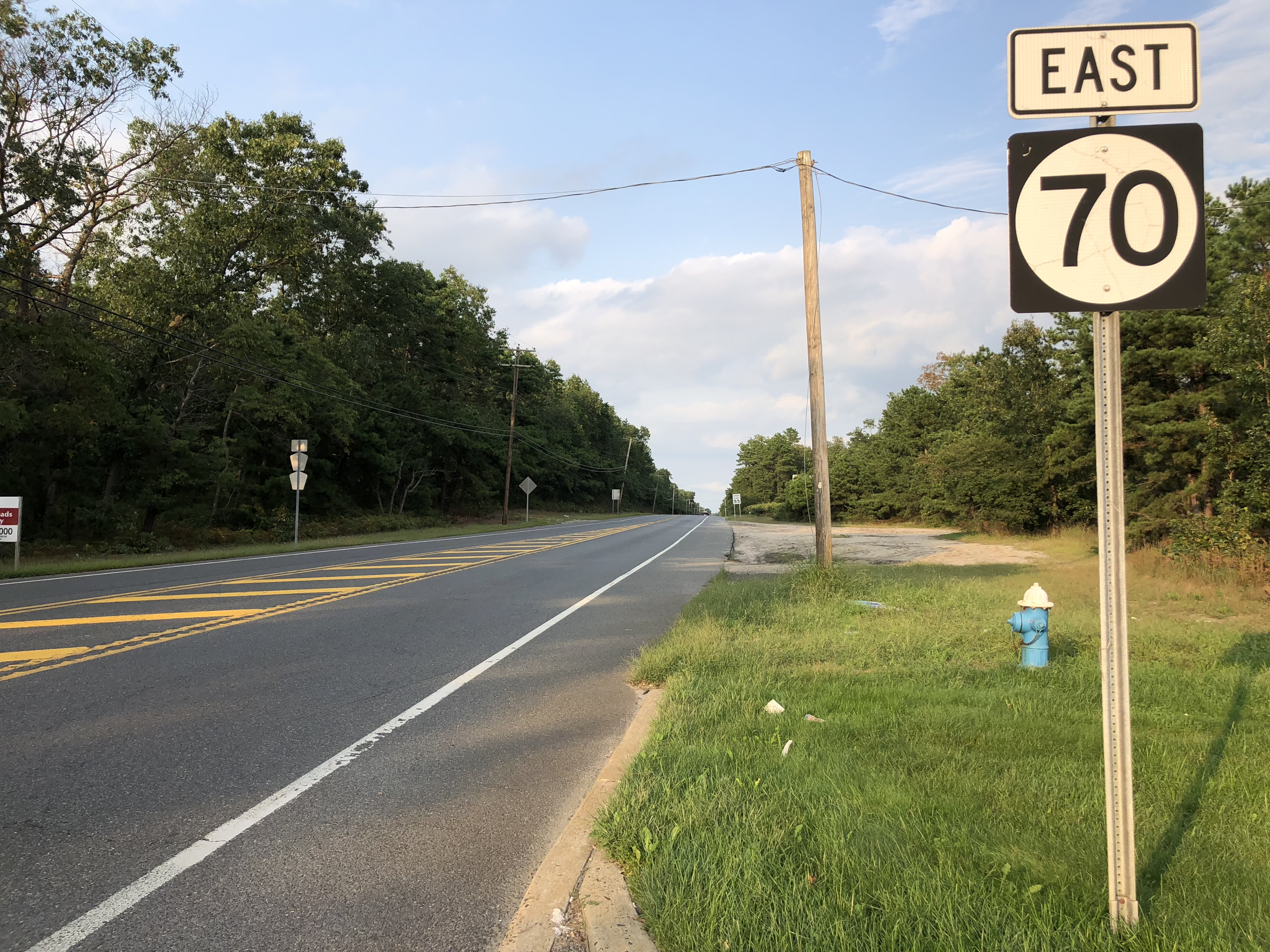
Rural portion of Route 70 eastbound past CR 530 and CR 539 in Manchester Township

A short distance later, the two routes enter Manchester in Ocean County and continue east through a tract of the Brendan T. Byrne State Forest within the Pine Barrens as well as a corner of the Fort Dix Military Reservation. The road eventually reaches the community of Whiting, where it passes commercial development at the intersection of Whiting–New Egypt Road (CR 539). Here, CR 530 turns south to follow CR 539 and Route 70 continues northeast back into the Pine Barrens. The road turns more to the north-northeast before heading east into Lakehurst to the south of the Lakehurst Maxfield Field naval station. In Lakehurst, Route 70 comes to the Eisenhower Traffic Circle with CR 4 and CR 12 before running through residential and commercial areas of the town. It intersects with Center Street (CR 547), where it widens into a four-lane divided highway. From here, the route crosses over the Southern Secondary railroad line operated by the Delaware & Raritan Railroad before coming to the Lakehurst Circle, where it intersects with Route 37.

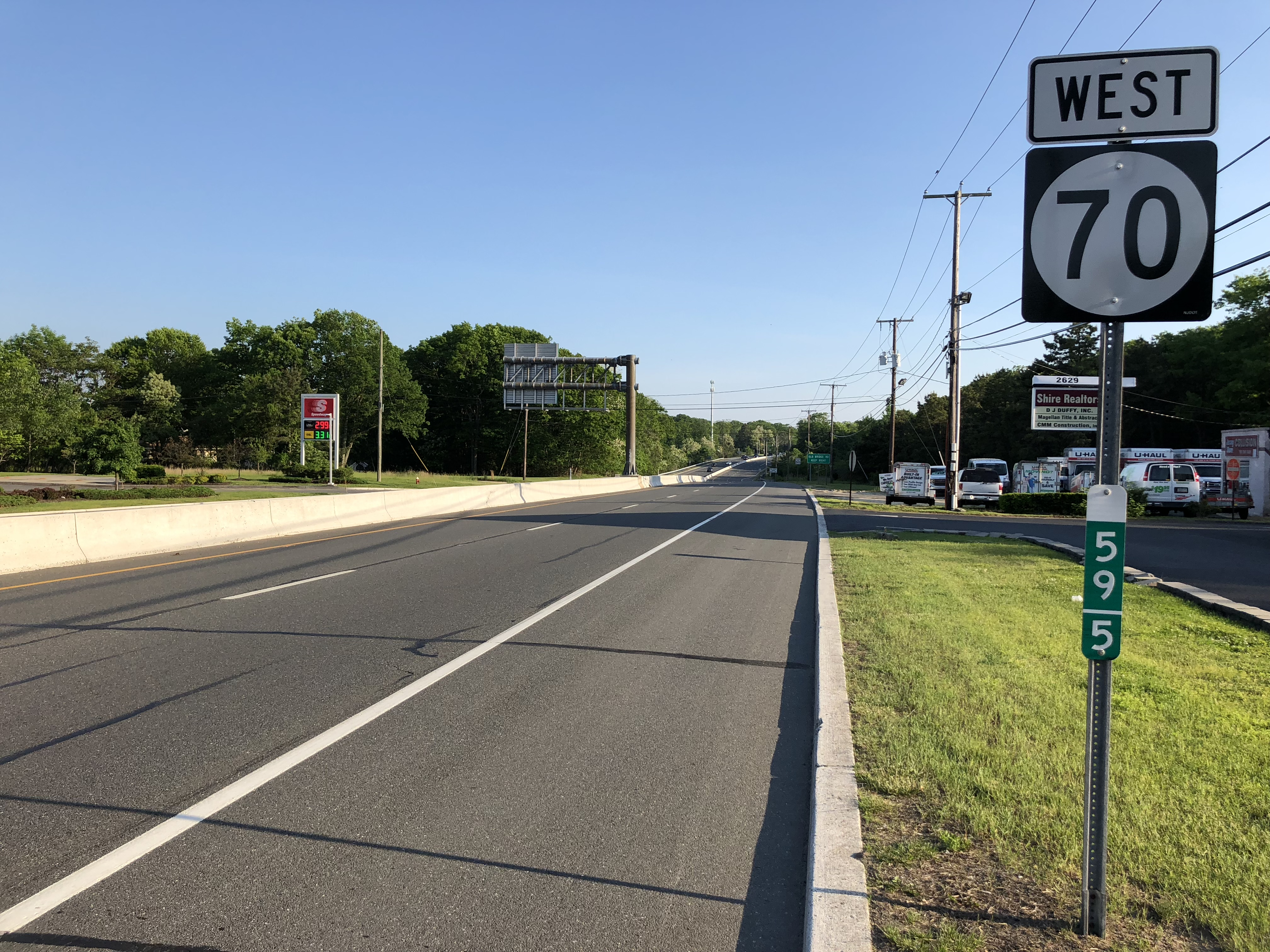
Route 70 westbound just past its eastern terminus at Route 34 and Route 35 in Wall Township

Route 70 enters Manchester again past this traffic circle and becomes a two-lane undivided road, passing near the wooded residential Leisure Knoll community before crossing the intersection of Ridgeway Road (CR 571). Past Ridgeway Road (CR 571), the route heads through wooded suburban residential and business areas, crossing into Toms River. Here, the road intersects with Whitesville Road (CR 527) and Massachusetts Avenue (CR 637) before becoming a four-lane divided highway again and encountering US 9 at a modified cloverleaf interchange. Following the US 9 interchange, Route 70 enters Lakewood and turns more to the east, crossing the intersection of New Hampshire Avenue (CR 623) before crossing a modified cloverleaf interchange with the Garden State Parkway. From here, the route continues into Brick and passes several shopping centers, intersecting with Cedar Bridge Avenue (CR 528), Chambers Bridge Road (CR 549), and Brick Blvd (CR 631). At the intersection of Cedar Bridge Avenue (CR 528), the road is briefly an undivided highway. It turns northeast, crossing the Metedeconk River before intersecting with Route 88 and Princeton Avenue (CR 630). After this intersection, Route 70 passes more inhabited areas separated from the road by trees, crossing both the intersections of Burnt Tavern Road (CR 632) and Herbertsville Road (CR 549 Spur). After a short distance, it becomes an undivided road and crosses the Manasquan River on the September 11th Memorial Bridge, briefly entering Point Pleasant and entering Brielle in Monmouth County. The September 11th Memorial Bridge is dedicated to residents of Monmouth and Ocean counties who lost their lives in the September 11 attacks. After the bridge, the route turns north through residential areas and becomes a divided highway again, briefly forming the border between Wall Township to the west and Brielle to the east before fully entering Wall Township. Route 70 ends at the former Brielle Circle intersection with Route 34 and Route 35, where the road continues north on Route 35.

== History ==
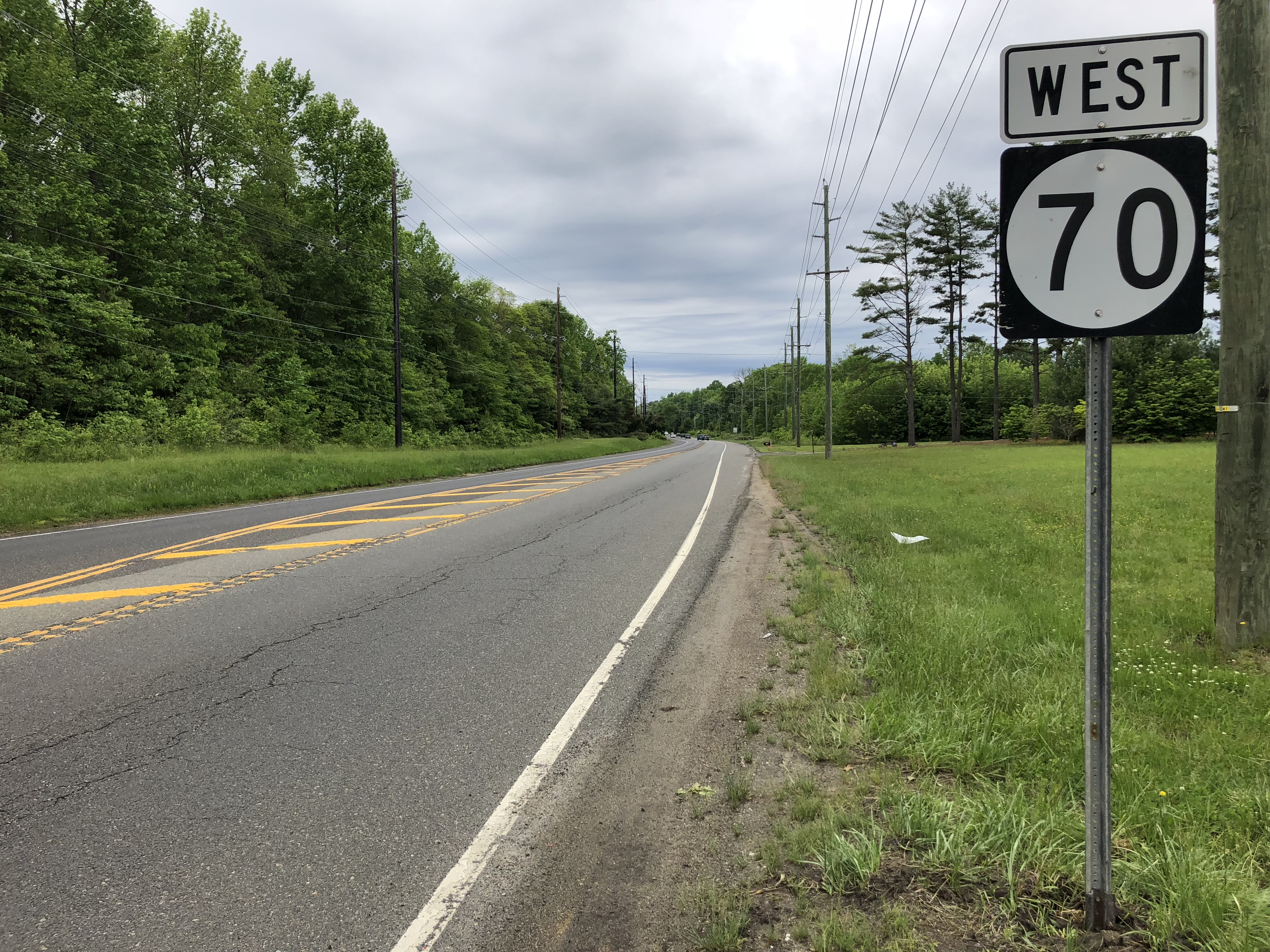
View west along Route 70 at Chairville Road and Skeet Road in Medford

The Camden, Ellisburg, and Marlton Turnpike was chartered in 1849 as a turnpike that was to run from Camden east to Marlton along what is today Route 70 and Browning Road (CR 612)/Marlton Pike (CR 601). The Marlton Pike was taken over by Camden County in 1907 at a time many other turnpikes became public roads. The current alignment of Route 70 between Whitesbog (the west end of the concurrency with CR 530) and Lakehurst was legislated as a part of pre-1927 Route 18 in 1923, a route that was to run from Camden to Toms River. In the 1927 New Jersey state highway renumbering, Route 40 was designated to run from Camden to Lakewood along the current alignment of Route 70. In addition a spur of this route called Route S40 (now Route 72) was designated to head from the route at the Four Mile Circle to Manahawkin. Eventually, the eastern terminus of Route 40 was moved to the Laurelton Circle in Brick, where it intersected Route 35 (now Route 88) as well as Route 34, which continued north from this point. The western terminus was placed at the Airport Circle with US 30 and US 130 in Pennsauken, ending concurrent with Route 38. In the 1953 New Jersey state highway renumbering, Route 40 was renumbered to Route 70, to avoid conflicting with US 40 in the state. Also, Route 70 was designated onto its current alignment between Route 38 in Pennsauken and Route 34 and Route 35 at the Brielle Circle, removing the concurrency with Route 38 and replacing the portion of Route 34 between the Laurelton Circle and the Brielle Circle.

Route 40
- Location: Camden–Lakewood
- Existed: 1927–1953

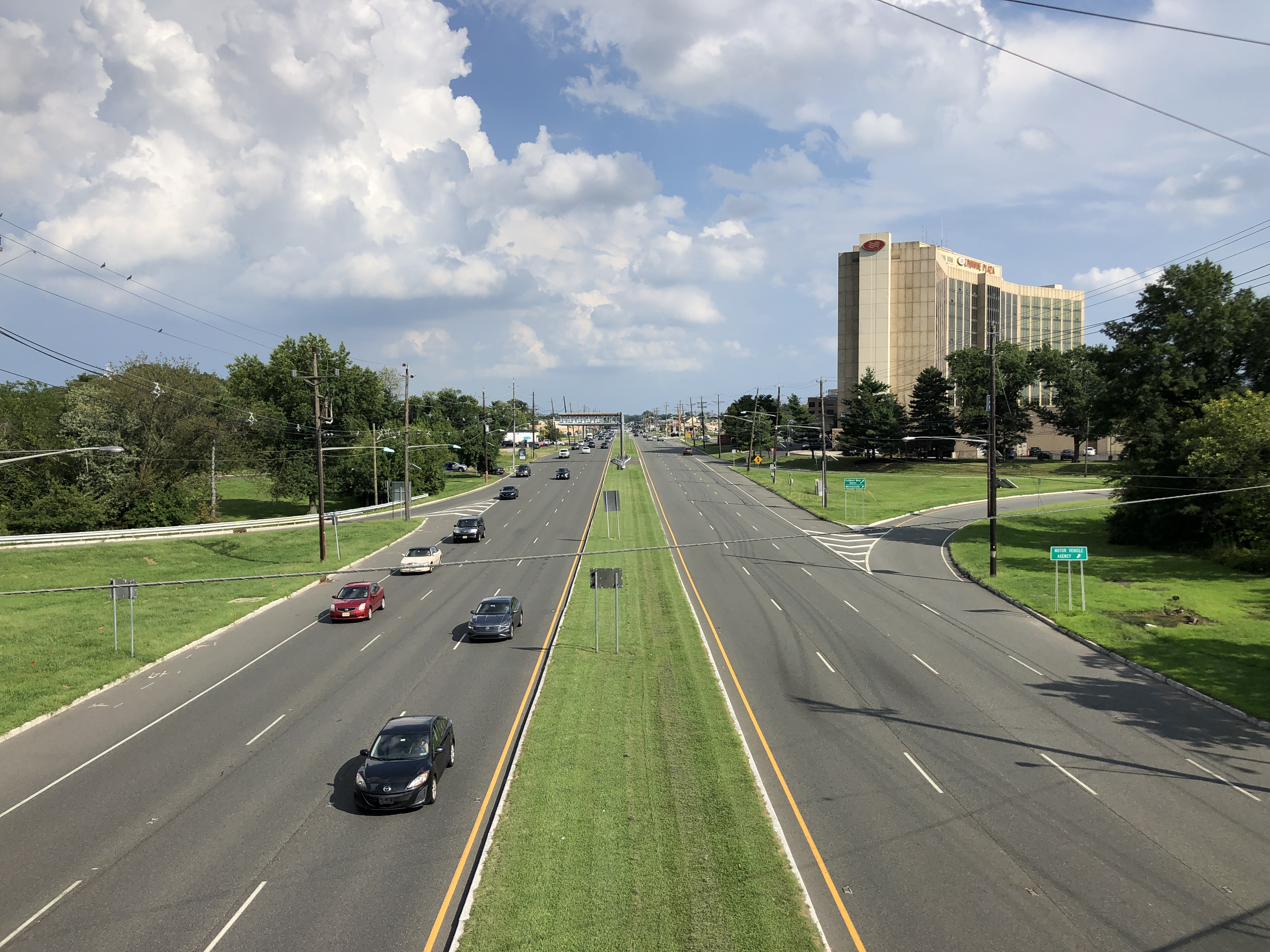
Route 70 eastbound in Cherry Hill

Since 1953, many changes have occurred to Route 70. Several traffic circles that had existed on the road had been either modified or replaced by at-grade intersections. The Marlton Circle at Route 73 in Marlton was modified in 1974 to allow Route 73 to run straight through the circle. This circle became known for traffic backups and was later replaced with an interchange. Construction on this interchange, which cost $31 million, began in April 2009. In May 2010, the circle was eliminated with a temporary at-grade intersection constructed while the Route 73 bridge over Route 70 was being built. The interchange was completed in June 2011. Also, the Race Track Circle at the intersection with Haddonfield Road/Grove Street (CR 644) was eventually replaced by an at-grade intersection. The Laurelton Circle at Route 88, built in 1937, was replaced by the 1990s. The Ellisburg Circle at Route 41 and Route 154, was replaced by an intersection with jughandles. The Brielle Circle at the eastern terminus was also converted to an intersection with jughandles in 2001. In conjunction with eliminating the Brielle Circle, Route 70 was also widened between the intersection with Jack Martin Boulevard in Brick Township and the former circle. In July 2004, floods caused by heavy rain washed away a bridge along the route in Southampton Township, leading for it to be replaced. The New Jersey Department of Transportation replaced the September 11th Memorial Bridge over the Manasquan River in a $52 million project that increased capacity on the bridge, added monumental decorations, and increased pedestrian access. Construction was completed in September 2008, two years ahead of schedule. In September 2021, NJDOT began a project to repave and reconstruct the section of Route 70 between Route 38 in Pennsauken Township and Cooper Avenue in Evesham Township. The project will include reconstructing jughandles, upgrading traffic signals, improvements to drainage systems, utility improvements, and pedestrian improvements. The reconstruction project is planned to be completed in early 2027.

== Major intersections ==
| County | Location | mi | km | Destinations | Notes |
|---|---|---|---|---|---|
| Camden | Pennsauken Township | 0.0 | 0.0 | Route 38 to US 30 / US 130 – Camden, B Franklin Br Marlton Pike/Browning Rd | Airport Circle; western terminus; access via CR 601/CR 612 |
| Camden | Cherry Hill | 1.0 | 1.6 | Cuthbert Blvd – Merchantville, Collingswood | Interchange; access via CR 636 |
| Camden | Cherry Hill | 3.6 | 5.8 | Route 41 (Kings Hwy) to Route 154 south (Brace Rd) – Haddonfield, Maple Shade | Former Ellisburg Circle; northern terminus of Route 154 |
| Camden | Cherry Hill | 5.0 | 8.0 | I-295 – Bellmawr, Del Mem Br, Mt Holly, Trenton | Exits 34A-B (I-295) |
| Burlington | Evesham Township | 8.3 | 13.4 | Route 73 to N.J. Turnpike / Old Marlton Pike/Main St – Berlin, Atlantic City, Palmyra, Tacony Br | Interchange; former Marlton Circle |
| Burlington | Medford | 13.9 | 22.4 | CR 541 (Medford–Mt Holly Rd/N Main St) | |
| Burlington | Southampton Township | 18.5 | 29.8 | US 206 to N.J. Turnpike north / A.C. Expressway – Trenton, New York, Hammonton, Atlantic City | Red Lion Circle |
| Burlington | Woodland Township | 26.3 | 42.3 | Route 72 east to G.S. Parkway south – Manahawkin, Long Beach Island New Lisbon Pemberton, Fort Dix, Mt Holly | Four Mile Circle; western terminus of Route 72 |
| Burlington | Pemberton Township | 33.3 | 53.6 | CR 530 west (Lakehurst Rd) – Browns Mills, Joint Base MDL | West end of the overlap with CR 530 |
| Ocean | Manchester Township | 38.4 | 61.8 | CR 530 east / CR 539 (Whiting–New Egypt Rd) – Trenton, Whiting, Forked River | East end of the overlap with CR 530 |
| Ocean | Lakehurst | 44.4 | 71.5 | CR 547 north (Center St) – Naval Base | Southern terminus of CR 547 |
| Ocean | Lakehurst | 44.7 | 71.9 | Route 37 east to G.S. Parkway south – Toms River, Seaside Hts | Lakehurst Circle; western terminus of Route 37 |
| Ocean | Manchester Township | 46.8 | 75.3 | CR 571 (Ridgeway Rd) – Jackson, Trenton, Toms River | |
| Ocean | Toms River | 48.6 | 78.2 | CR 527 (Whitesville Rd) – Whitesville, Toms River | |
| Ocean | Toms River | 49.9 | 80.3 | US 9 – Lakewood, Toms River | Interchange |
| Ocean | Lakewood Township | 52.7 | 84.8 | G.S. Parkway – Woodbridge, Toms River | Exits 89A (northbound), 89A-B (southbound) (Garden State Parkway) |
| Ocean | Brick Township | 54.0 | 86.9 | CR 528 (Cedar Bridge Ave) – Lakewood, Mantoloking | |
| Ocean | Brick Township | 54.3 | 87.4 | CR 549 (Chambers Bridge Rd) – Herbertsville, Breton Woods, Mantoloking | |
| Ocean | Brick Township | 55.1 | 88.7 | Route 88 to G.S. Parkway – Lakewood, Pt Pleasant | Former Laurelton Circle |
| Ocean | Brick Township | 57.7 | 92.9 | CR 549 Spur (Herbertsville Rd) – Herbertsville, Pt Pleasant | |
| Monmouth | Wall Township | 59.8 | 96.2 | Route 34 north to G.S. Parkway – Matawan Route 35 north – Belmar Route 35 south – Seaside Pk | Eastern terminus; former Brielle Circle; southern terminus of Route 34 |
1.000 mi = 1.609 km; 1.000 km = 0.621 mi: Concurrency terminus; Tolled
