= Traffic circles in New Jersey =

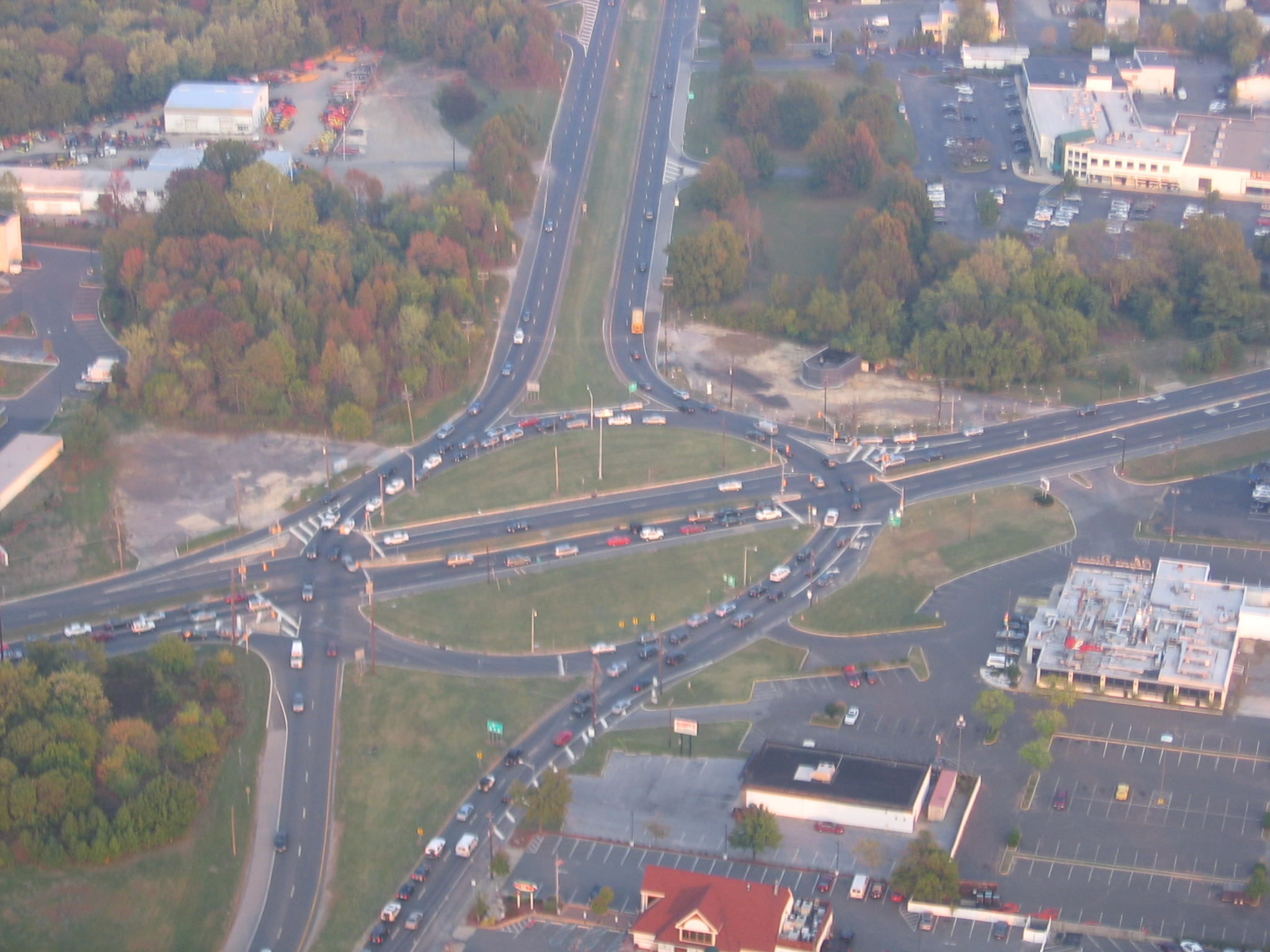
Marlton Circle before retrofit project to form a grade separated interchange

The U.S. state of New Jersey at one point had a total of 101 traffic circles, 44 of which were part of state roads. However, the number has shrunk as traffic circles have been phased out by the New Jersey Department of Transportation. In the 1920s and 1930s, New Jersey felt that traffic circles were an efficient way for moving traffic through three or more intersecting roads. Built in 1925, the first traffic circle in New Jersey was the Airport Circle in Pennsauken. Many of these interchanges are rotaries in design, as opposed to the more successful modern roundabout.

As suburban and rural populations grew New Jersey's traffic circles became outdated. The increased number of drivers on the roads resulted in traffic circles being more likely to hinder traffic than help it. Increased number of vehicles and faster traffic speeds made traffic circles more dangerous and accidents common. Many traffic circles became notorious for having frequent accidents and being confusing, especially for non-locals. Starting around the 1970s, the New Jersey Department of Transportation began phasing out traffic circles. Common methods of eliminating traffic circles are building a road through the circle, adding traffic lights, and the use of grade separation.

Modified traffic circles are intersections where parts or all of the original circle still exist as a major part of the intersection.

== List ==
Name	Image	Location	Status	Intersecting roads	Notes
Airport Circle (Newark)		Newark 40.708214°N 74.181135°W	Defunct	US 1/9, Route 21, US 22	Eliminated due to the construction of the New Jersey Turnpike and the subsequent expansion of Newark Airport.
Airport Circle		Pennsauken; 39.9337°N 75.0823°W	Modified	US 30, US 130, Route 70, Route 38, Kaighns Avenue	First traffic circle in New Jersey. Built 1925, opened 1927. Traffic lights, ramps and overpasses have been added.
Airport Circle		Egg Harbor Township; 39.4318°N 74.5791°W	Modified	CR 563, CR 646, Amelia Earhart Boulevard	Entrance to the Atlantic City International Airport. In 2011, the circle was revised to allow Delilah Road motorists to pass straight through the circle, plus the addition of traffic signals. Direct connection ramps are proposed to help funnel traffic to and from the airport.
Alexander Street Circle (Roundabout)		Princeton; 40.3430°N 74.6608°W	Original	Alexander Street, University Place	Opened February 2014.
Allwood Circle		Clifton; 40.843°N 74.1596°W	Modified	Allwood Road (CR 602), Bloomfield Avenue (CR 622)	Reconfigured to roundabout alignment.
Allenwood Circle (Hurleys Corner Circle)		Wall Township; 40.1501°N 74.0960°W	Modified	Route 34 & Allaire Road	Built in the 1930s to support increased traffic in the area. Modified in 2021 with marked lanes and better signage.
Asbury Park Circle		Ocean Township and Neptune; 40.2261°N 74.0377°W	Original	Route 35, Route 66, Asbury Avenue (CR 16)	Built in the 1940s to support increased traffic in the area.
Barrington Circle		Barrington; 39.8762°N 75.0495°W	Modified	US 30, Route 41	
Bayway Circle		Elizabeth; 40.6507°N 74.2211°W	Modified	US 1/9, Route 439	Originally built to connect the Edgar Plank Road with Elizabeth's Spring Street (via a modified Carlton Street between Edgar Road and the circle and a brand-new highway between Spring Street and the circle), both of which are now part of US 1/9.
Berlin Circle		Berlin Township; 39.8016°N 74.9316°W	Defunct	Route 73, Berlin-Cross Keys Road and Walker Avenue	Replaced by an at-grade intersection
Boulevard and Passaic Avenue Circle		Hasbrouck Heights; 40.8580°N 74.0817°W	Original	Boulevard, Passaic Avenue	While there was no circle in this town originally, increased traffic required a circle to be built.
Bound Brook Circle		Bound Brook; 40.5615°N 74.5278°W	Original	East Main Street and Bolmer Boulevard	One of the newer traffic circles in the state. Built in the early-mid 2000s as a traffic calming solution at a former three-way intersection, and also as part of a realignment of the same intersection.
Brielle Circle		Wall Township; 40.1162°N 74.0729°W	Defunct	Route 34, Route 35, Route 70	Replaced with an at-grade intersection with jughandles.
Brookdale Circle		Lincroft; 40.3321°N 74.1317°W	Original	CR 520, Campus Drive	Added in 2007; replaced a signalized at-grade intersection. Located at the entrance to Brookdale Community College and the Lincroft Bible Church.
Brooklawn East Circle		Brooklawn 39.8758°N 75.1227°W		US 130, Route 47, CR 551, South Hannevig Avenue	
Brooklawn West Circle		Brooklawn 39.8767°N 75.1245°W		US 130, CR 551	
Browning Road Circle		Pennsauken	Defunct	NJ 38, NJ 70, Marlton Pike, Browning Road	
Brunswick Circle		Trenton and Lawrence Township; 40.2453°N 74.7428°W		US 206, US 1 Bus., CR 645	
Burnet Street Circle		New Brunswick 40.484310°N 74.417341°W	Defunct	US 1, NJ 18	
Camp Merritt Memorial Circle		Cresskill; 40.9413°N 73.9768°W		CR 505 (Knickerbocker Road), Madison Avenue	Site of the Camp Merritt Memorial Monument, an obelisk standing 66 feet (20 m) that marks the 578 victims of an influenza outbreak at Camp Merritt, which was used an embarkation point for soldiers heading to Europe during World War I.
Cardiff Circle		Egg Harbor Township; 39.4073°N 74.5637°W	Defunct	US 40, US 322, CR 563	
Charlotte Circle		Jersey City; 40.738320°N 74.073660°W	Defunct	US 1/9 Truck, NJ 7, Newark Ave, James Ave, Dey St, Howell St	
Chesterfield Circle		Chesterfield Township; 40.130592°N 74.661938°W	Original	CR 528, Old York Road (CR 660)	Technically a roundabout
Clark Circle		Clark; 40.6269°N 74.3044°W	Modified	G.S. Pkwy., Central Avenue (CR 613), Walnut Avenue (CR 632)	Exit 135 of the Garden State Parkway, traffic lights added in 2007.
Cleveland Lane Circle #1		Princeton 40.35095°N 74.67376°W			Traffic calming circle
Cleveland Lane Circle #2		Princeton 40.35166°N 74.67208°W			Traffic calming circle
College Drive Circle (Roundabout)		Gloucester Township; 39.7877°N 75.0435°W		CR 673	Built in 2009 at the entrance to Camden County College. 3 other traffic circles were built on college grounds, along with new service roads for improved safety and more accessibility to the college, near Route 42 and Route 168.
Collingswood Circle		Collingswood; 39.9189°N 75.0888°W	Defunct	US 30, US 130, White Horse Pike, Woodlynne Avenue	Replaced by an at-grade intersection with jughandles in 2009.
Collingwood Circle		Wall Township; 40.2192°N 74.1284°W		Route 33, Route 34, CR 547	
Cooper Landing Circle		Cherry Hill; 39.9405°N 75.0098°W	Modified	Route 38, Cooper Landing Road, Church Road	
Cranbury-Hightstown Circle		Cranbury; 40.2919°N 74.5205°W		US 130, CR 539, Old Trenton Road (CR 685)	
Dvoor's Circle / Route 12 Circle		Raritan Township; 40.5044°N 74.8712°W		Route 12, CR 523, Mine Street	
Eatontown Circle		Eatontown; 40.2909°N 74.0518°W	Defunct	Route 35, Route 36	Replaced by an at-grade intersection in the 1980s, said intersection relocated as part of a project completed in 2009
Eisenhower Traffic Circle		Lakehurst; 40.0117°N 74.3259°W		Route 70, Union Avenue, South Union Avenue, Pine Street, Myrtle Avenue	
Ellisburg Circle		Cherry Hill; 39.9138°N 75.0102°W	Defunct	Route 41, Route 70, Route 154	
Flemington Circle		Flemington; 40.5026°N 74.8534°W	Modified	US 202, Route 12, Route 31	Upgraded with at-grade overpasses in the 1950s, planning once made to replace it with a modern roundabout.
Four Mile Circle		Southampton, Pemberton Township; 39.8989°N 74.5963°W		Route 70, Route 72, Magnolia Road (CR 644), New Lisbon Road (CR 646)	
Franklin Lake Circle		Franklin Lakes; 40.9935°N 74.2123°W		Franklin Lake Road, High Mountain Road	
Freehold Circle		Freehold Township; 40.2592°N 74.2912°W	Defunct	US 9, Route 33 Bus., Manalapan Avenue	Replaced by a at-grade interaction in the late 1980s, with ramps also allowing for ascess to the then truncated Manalapan Avenue
General Circle		Fort Dix 40.0167°N 74.6358°W	Modified	Route 68, Pemberton-Wrightstown Road, 4th Street	Formerly served Fort Dix Road
Green Street Circle		Woodbridge 40.5629°N 74.3003°W	Defunct	US 1, Green Street	
Ho-Ho-Kus Circle		Ho-Ho-Kus 40.9933°N 74.0962°W	Defunct	Route 17, Racetrack Road	
Lakehurst Circle		Lakehurst; 40.0128°N 74.3052°W		Route 37, Route 70	
Laurelton Circle		Brick; 40.0688°N 74.1303°W	Defunct	Route 70, Route 88, CR 630	Replaced in 1986
Ledgewood Circle		Ledgewood in Roxbury; 40.8790°N 74.6508°W	Defunct	US 46, Route 10, Circle Drive	Converted to 3-way signaled intersection (late 1990s)
Linden Circle		Linden; 40.6399°N 74.2879°W	Defunct	Raritan Road (CR 607), Centennial Avenue (CR 615)	
Little Ferry Circle		Little Ferry; 40.8529°N 74.0340°W	Defunct	US 46, Bergen Turnpike	
Livingston Circle		Livingston; 40.7963°N 74.3413°W	Modified	Eisenhower Parkway, Route 10 (Mt. Pleasant Avenue), West Northfield Road	
Main Street Circle		Flemington; 40.5018°N 74.8586°W		Route 12, Main Street, South Main Street, Reaville Avenue	
Manasquan Circle		Wall Township; 40.1323°N 74.0652°W		Route 35, CR 524 Spur	
Maple Shade Circle		Maple Shade39.9432°N 74.9785°W	Defunct	Route 38, Route 41, Route 73	
Marlton Circle		Marlton in Evesham Township; 39.8938°N 74.9278°W	Defunct	Route 70, Route 73	Replaced with by a grade-separated interchange in 2011.
McKee City Circle		Egg Harbor Township; 39.4505°N 74.6424°W	Defunct	US 40, US 322	Teardrop-shaped circle where US 40 and US 322 split. Replaced by a at-grade cloverleaf.
Medford Circle		Medford; 39.9047°N 74.8244°W	Defunct	Route 70, CR 541	
Monument Circle		Englewood; 40.8967°N 73.9797°W		CR 505 (West Palisade Avenue), Tenafly Road, Bennett Road, Lafayette Avenue	
Morlot Avenue Bridge Circle		Paterson; 40.9230°N 74.1413°W	Defunct	Route 20, 10th Avenue (CR 651)	
Netcong Circle		Netcong; 40.8968°N 74.7003°W	Defunct	US 46, Route 183	Converted to 4-way intersection (August 2013)
Park and Passaic Avenues		Rutherford; 40.8263°N 74.1072°W	Modified		
Pavilion Circle		Cape May Point 38.9379°N 74.9668°W		Cape Avenue, Pavilion Avenue, Central Avenue, Oxford Avenue, Ocean Avenue	
Penhorn Circle		North Bergen 40.7736°N 74.042°W	Defunct	US 1/9, Route 3	
Pennington Circle		Pennington; 40.3082°N 74.7866°W		Route 31, CR 546, Pennington Road (CR 640)	Metering lights added in late 2015
Penns Neck Circle		Penns Neck in West Windsor; 40.3315°N 74.6380°W	Modified	US 1, CR 526/CR 571	
Pole Tavern Circle		Upper Pittsgrove Township; 39.6170°N 75.2294°W		US 40, Route 77, Monroeville Road (CR 604), Daretown Road (CR 635)	
Pompton Plains Circle / Jackson Circle		Pequannock 40.9689°N 74.2859°W	Defunct	Route 23, Jackson Avenue	
Pudgy Circle		McGuire AFB, New Hanover; 40.0354°N 74.5868°W		McGuire Boulevard, 1st Street	
Race Track Circle		Cherry Hill; 39.9194°N 75.0343°W	Defunct	Route 70, Haddonfield Road (CR 644)	
Ramsey Circle		Ramsey 41.0688°N 74.1357°W	Defunct	Route 17, CR 507	
Red Lion Circle		Southampton; 39.8872°N 74.7411°W		US 206, Route 70	
Ratzer Road Circle		Wayne 40.9465°N 74.2739°W	Defunct	Route 23, US 202, CR 504	
Ridgefield Circle		Ridgefield; 40.8331°N 74.0103°W	Defunct	US 1, Route 93, Hendricks Causeway	
Ridgewood Circle		Ridgewood 40.9831°N 74.0888°W	Defunct	Route 17, Paramus Road, E Saddle River Road	
Riverdale Circle		Riverdale 40.9853°N 74.3033°W	Defunct	Route 23, CR 511 Alt., Windbeam Road	
Ross Dock Circle		Fort Lee 40.8577°N 73.959°W		Henry Hudson Drive, road to Ross Dock	
Rosedale Circle		Princeton 40.34571°N 74.68806°W			Mini-roundabout
Routes 1 & 130 Circle		North Brunswick; 40.4627°N 74.4553°W	Defunct	US 1, US 130, Route 171	Replaced by at-grade intersection, now an interchange.
Sharon Station Road		Upper Freehold; 40.1498°N 74.5384°W	Recent	CR 539, CR 539A	Opened in 2022.
Somers Point Circle		Somers Point; 39.3087°N 74.5993°W	Defunct	Route 52, CR 559, CR 585	Replaced by an intersection with traffic signals.
Somerville Circle		Bridgewater and Raritan; 40.5757°N 74.6290°W	Modified	US 202, US 206, Route 28	An overpass and traffic lights were added in the 1990s.
Station Square		Rutherford; 40.8284°N 74.1011°W	Modified	Park Avenue, Orient Way, Union Avenue, and Erie Avenue	Rebuilt August 2003 - 2005
Still Valley Circle		Pohatcong 40.673333°N 75.138611°W	Defunct	US 22, US 22 Alt., Still Valley Road	
Teaneck Circle		Teaneck 40.8843°N 74.0073°W	Defunct	Teaneck Road, Cedar Lane	
Tonnele Circle		Jersey City; 40.7394°N 74.0654°W	Modified	US 1/9, US 1/9 Truck, Route 139, Tonnele Avenue	reconfigured 1950s, 2000s, 2010s
Veterans' Memorial Circle		Vineland 39.4934°N 75.0229°W		N 6th St, Cambridge St	
Victory Circle		Sayreville; 40.4962°N 74.2978°W	Defunct	US 9, Route 35, Chevalier Avenue, Main Street	Replaced with a diamond interchange in 2006, which was modified in 2020 as part of improvements to Chevalier Avenue and its extension.
Vineland Circle		Vineland 39.487°N 75.0431°W	Defunct	Route 47, Route 56, Landis Ave	
War Memorial Circle		Atlantic City 39.3512°N 74.4548°W	Defunct	US 40, US 322, Albany Ave, Ventnor Ave	
Watchung Circle		Mountainside; 40.6872°N 74.3639°W		W R Tracy Drive (CR 645), Summit Lane (CR 642)	
Westfield Circle		Westfield; 40.6485°N 74.3503°W		CR 509, South Avenue (CR 610), Route 28, Westfield Avenue, Watterson Street	Expanded to two lanes in 2005 with one way designations added to Watterson Street (Inbound), and Westfield Avenue (Outbound)
White Horse Circle		White Horse in Hamilton; 40.1882°N 74.7048°W	Modified	US 206, CR 524, CR 533	
Willowbrook Circle		Wayne 40.8936°N 74.2516°W	Defunct	US 46, Route 23, CR 703	Replaced by a spaghetti bowl interchange with the construction of I-80 in the late 1950s
		Brooklawn 39.8772°N 75.1201°W		Noreg Place, Christiana St, Maude Ave	
		Brooklawn 39.8781°N 75.1220°W		Wilson Avenue, Horton Avenue, Tommy McAdams Way	
		Pohatcong 40.6812°N 75.1471°W	Defunct	US 22, CR 519	
		Washington 40.7594°N 74.975°W	Defunct	Route 31, Route 57	
		Egg Harbor Township 39.4002°N 74.5611°W	Defunct	US 40, US 322, Black Horse Pike, Tilton Road	
		Wayne 40.924864°N 74.269058°W	Defunct	Route 23, US 202, Newark-Pompton Turnpike	Only operated as such southbound on Route 23; northbound side unimpeded
		Paterson 40.9026°N 74.1354°W	Defunct	Route 20, Market Street	
		Paterson 40.9019°N 74.1411°W		Market Street, Lakeview Avenue	
		Woodland Park 40.8764°N 74.2011°W		Great Notch Road, Notch Road, Rifle Camp Road, Lackawanna Avenue	
		Little Falls 40.8725°N 74.1966°W		Exit to US 46, Clove Road, entrance to Overlook Corporate Center	
		Perth Amboy 40.5286°N 74.28°W	Defunct	Route 35, Route 440 (now partly Route 184)	
		Cherry Hill 39.9384°N 75.03°W	Defunct	Route 38, Haddonfield Road	
		Old Bridge Township 40.409894°N 74.361872°W	Defunct	NJ 18, CR 516, CR 527	
		Fort Dix 40.0298°N 74.6188°W		CR 545, Pemberton-Wrightstown Road, Delaware Avenue, Neely Road	
		Fort Dix 40.0291°N 74.6115°W		Broidy Road, Wonnacott Avenue	
		New Hanover 40.0355°N 74.5868°W		West Tuskegee Airmen Avenue, McGuire Blvd	
		New Hanover 40.0279°N 74.585°W		McGuire Boulevard, Arnold Avenue	
		Alpine 40.9398°N 73.9216°W		Henry Hudson Drive, Hudson Drive	
		Jersey City 40.6998°N 74.0672°W		Bayview Ave, Burma Road, Morris Pesin Drive	
		Bayonne 40.6826°N 74.0991°W		Avenue E	Exits on the north side of the circle divide access to the east and westbound ramps of I-78
