= Berlin Circle (traffic circle) =

Former traffic circle in Berlin Township, New Jersey

- Interactive map of Berlin Circle

Location
- Berlin Township, New Jersey
- Coordinates: 39.801213°N 74.932066°W
- Roads at junction: Route 73; CR 689; CR 708

Construction
- Type: Signalized intersection

The Berlin Circle was a traffic circle in Berlin Township, New Jersey, United States located at the intersection of Route 73, Berlin-Cross Keys Road and Walker Avenue, and which also received traffic from nearby U.S. Route 30, and County Route 561. The New Jersey Department of Transportation (NJDOT) began replacement of the circle in August 2006. The project cost $73 million. The circle was replaced with an at-grade intersection with traffic signals. The project was completed in 2007.

== History ==
The circle was created in 1953 when Route 73 was created, and marked the crossroads of two state highways, three county roads, four local roads and a railway. The circle was constructed at a time when Berlin was largely rural and the land in the area used primarily for agricultural purposes. By 2002 and with increased suburbanization of the area, the circle became notorious for its congestion and traffic accidents, and for flooding caused by the Great Egg Harbor River.

New Jersey has had an abundance of traffic circles built throughout the 20th century and is home to the first such circle in the United States, the Airport Circle in Pennsauken Township, which opened in 1927. While the state had as many as 67 traffic circles at its peak, projects initiated by the NJDOT since the mid-1970s had reduced the count to 37 by 1999.

== Proposed changes ==
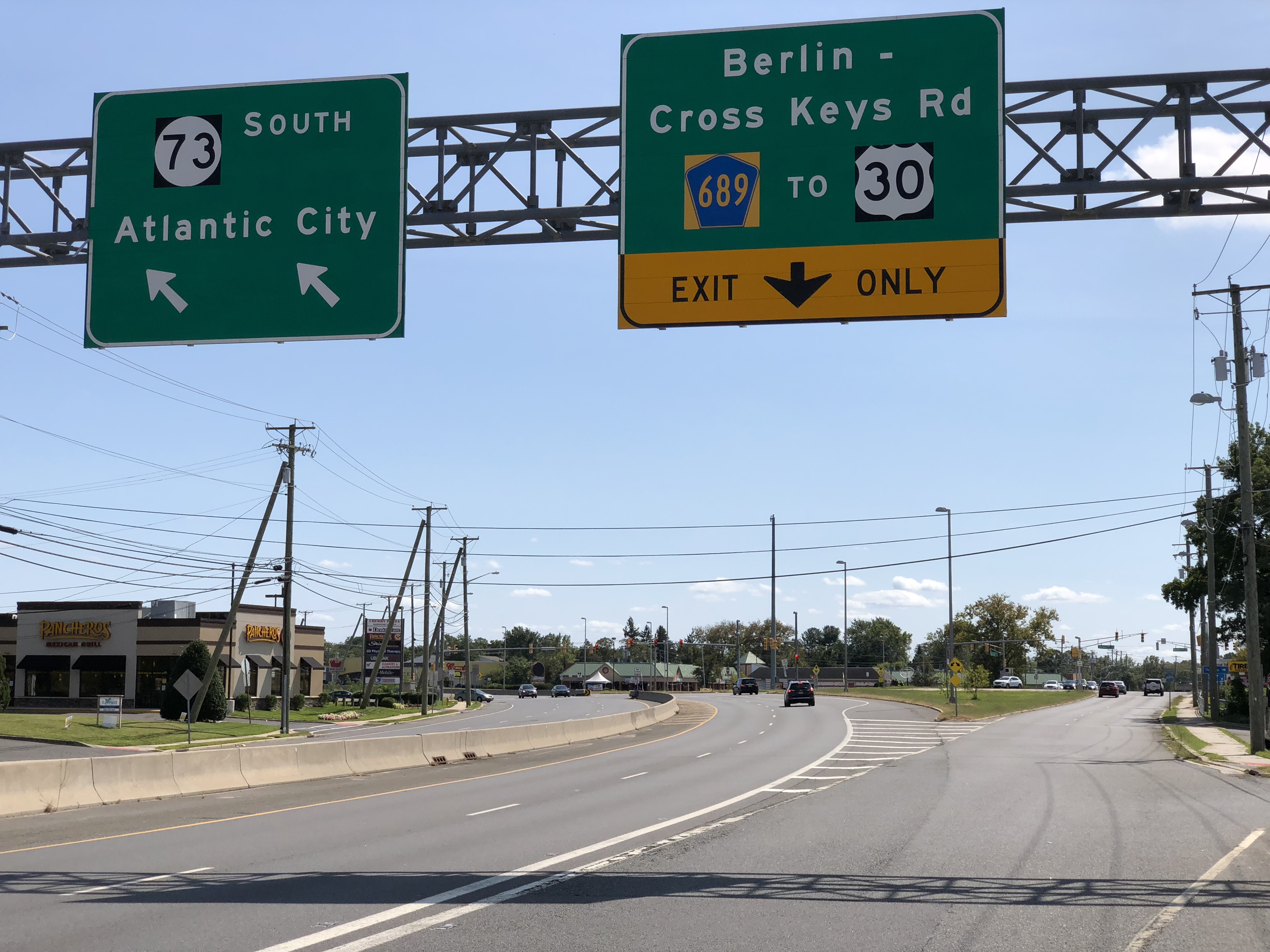
Approaching the former Berlin Circle

In addition to the traffic issues, the NJDOT undertook an analysis of the drainage issues associated with the road infrastructure, in conjunction with the local office of Parsons Brinckerhoff. The preliminary planning studies for the roadway redesign had been completed in 1998, and in 2002 the NJDOT expected to have the design completed in 2004 and construction finished by 2007.

Plans to eliminate the Berlin Circle and Collingswood Circle, two of what were the state's most congested interchanges, were announced in 1999, with estimates that the cost would be $16 million for the project. In announcing that funds for the two $8 million projects had been obtained from the federal government through the Intermodal Surface Transportation Efficiency Act, Congressman Rob Andrews noted that these were "two of South Jersey's worst traffic nightmares".

Construction began in August 2005, and Route 73 was shifted to avoid the circle as of September 14, 2006.

By 2006, the project had been in motion for over a year and the price tag had risen to $73 million. Local merchants at the circle and along the portions of Route 73 being shifted complained that the traffic delays and confusion caused by the project had resulted in business being down as much as 60% at area businesses.

The completed project featured a wider roadway and drainage improvements on Route 73, Route 30, Berlin Cross Keys Road and Walker Avenue, with new ramps and access roads created to allow the retention of all of the traffic flows offered as part of the traffic circle. Crossings on Route 73 were combined into four intersections controlled by traffic signals. New sidewalks and curbs were also included, as were bike lanes. New basins, box culverts, pipes and inlets were added to improve holding capacity in storms and mitigate flooding at the intersection.

== See also ==
- List of traffic circles in New Jersey
