= New Jersey Route 154 =

State highway in Camden County, New Jersey, US

Route 154
- Brace Road

Route information
- Maintained by NJDOT
- Length: 1.70 mi (2.74 km)
- Existed: 1953–present

Major junctions
- South end: CR 561 in Cherry Hill
- Route 41 / CR 573 in Cherry Hill
- North end: Route 41 / Route 70 in Cherry Hill

Location
- Country: United States
- State: New Jersey
- Counties: Camden

Highway system
- New Jersey State Highway Routes; Interstate; US; State; Scenic Byways
← Route 153	→ Route 155

Route 154 is a state highway in Cherry Hill Township, Camden County, New Jersey. The route begins at an intersection with County Route 561 (CR 561) in Cherry Hill, heading northward to the site of the former Ellisburg Circle, where Route 154 reaches its northern terminus at Route 41 (Kings Highway) and Route 70. The route ends concurrent with Route 41 for the short distance from the junction between the two routes. Brace Road is the local name for Route 154 for its entire length.

Route 154 is an original portion of Route 41, defined in the 1927 renumbering. The route remained intact for several decades, until the construction of a bypass around Haddonfield. By the time of the 1953 renumbering on January 1, 1953, Route 41 was realigned onto a county-maintained roadway, signed as Temporary Route 41, while the former alignment went unnumbered. During the 1960s, the old alignment was designated as Route 154, but was unsigned until 1992. From 1984 to 1992, the New Jersey Department of Transportation removed the Ellisburg Circle, built in 1938 at Route 154's northern terminus.

== Route description ==
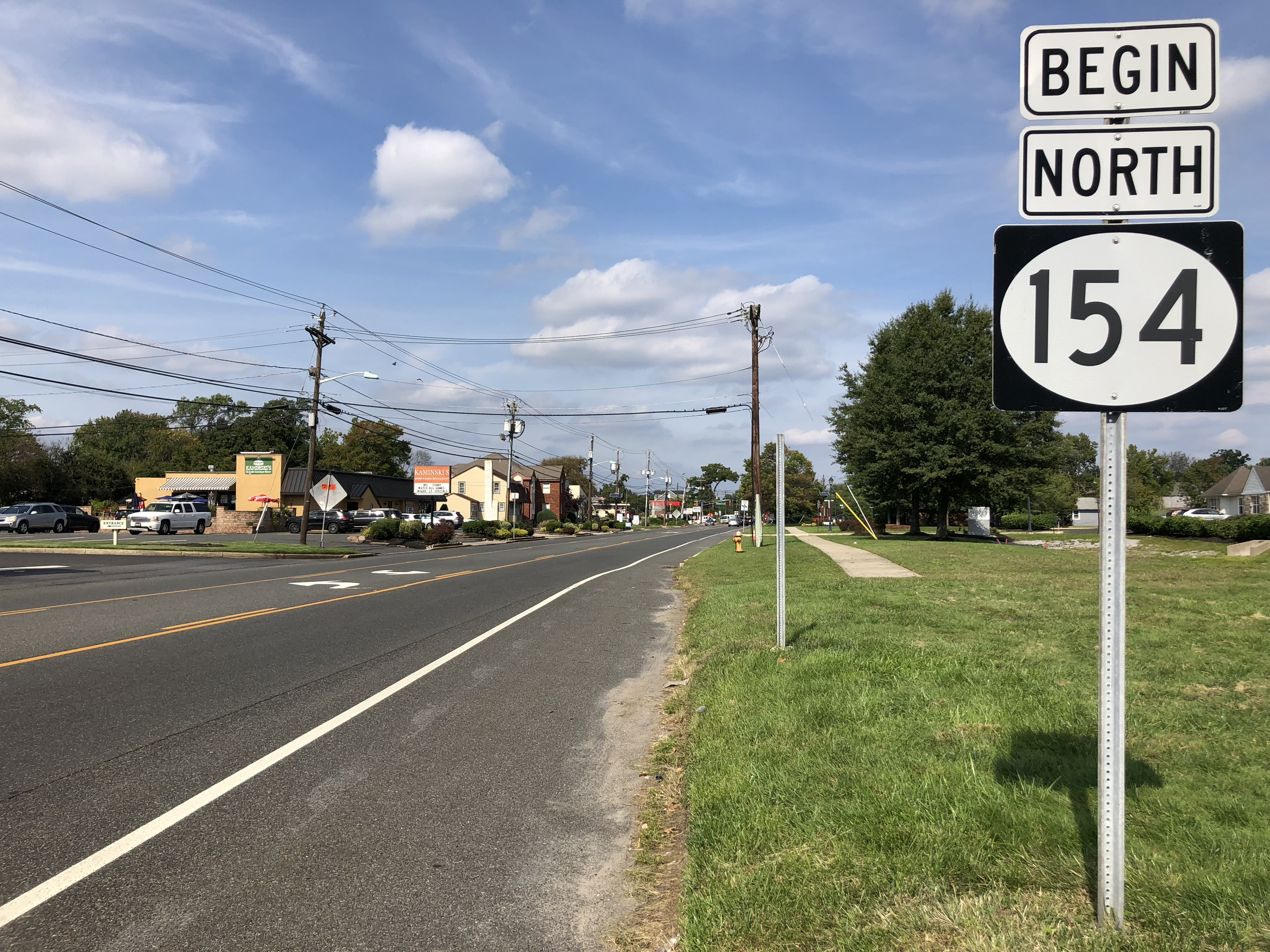
View north at the south end of Route 154 at CR 561 in Cherry Hill

Route 154 begins at an intersection with CR 561 (Haddonfield-Berlin Road) in the township of Cherry Hill. The site of the former Cherry Hill Arena, now occupied by a shopping center, lies on the route's east side at its beginning. The highway progresses northward as Brace Road, passing through some large commercial districts and to the east of Tyndall Village. The route continues, passing several small commercial businesses until approaching an intersection with CR 671 (Kresson Road) in the northeast portion of Tyndall Village. Route 154 continues northward, passing to the east of several more commercial buildings, while the surroundings become woodland to the northwest and east for a short distance. The route continues northward, passing Kingsway Circle Park before becoming moderately developed with homes and businesses.

After the intersection with Munn Lane West, Route 154 becomes surrounded by large, deep patches of trees until the intersection with Kenwood Drive, where residential homes return. At the intersection, Route 154 gains its own service road for the local residences, which terminate a block away. A short distance later, Route 41 comes in from the west and becomes concurrent with Route 154 for a short distance. Passing some large businesses in Ellisburg, a part of Cherry Hill, Route 41 and Route 154 intersect with Route 70, where Route 154's designation terminates.

== History ==
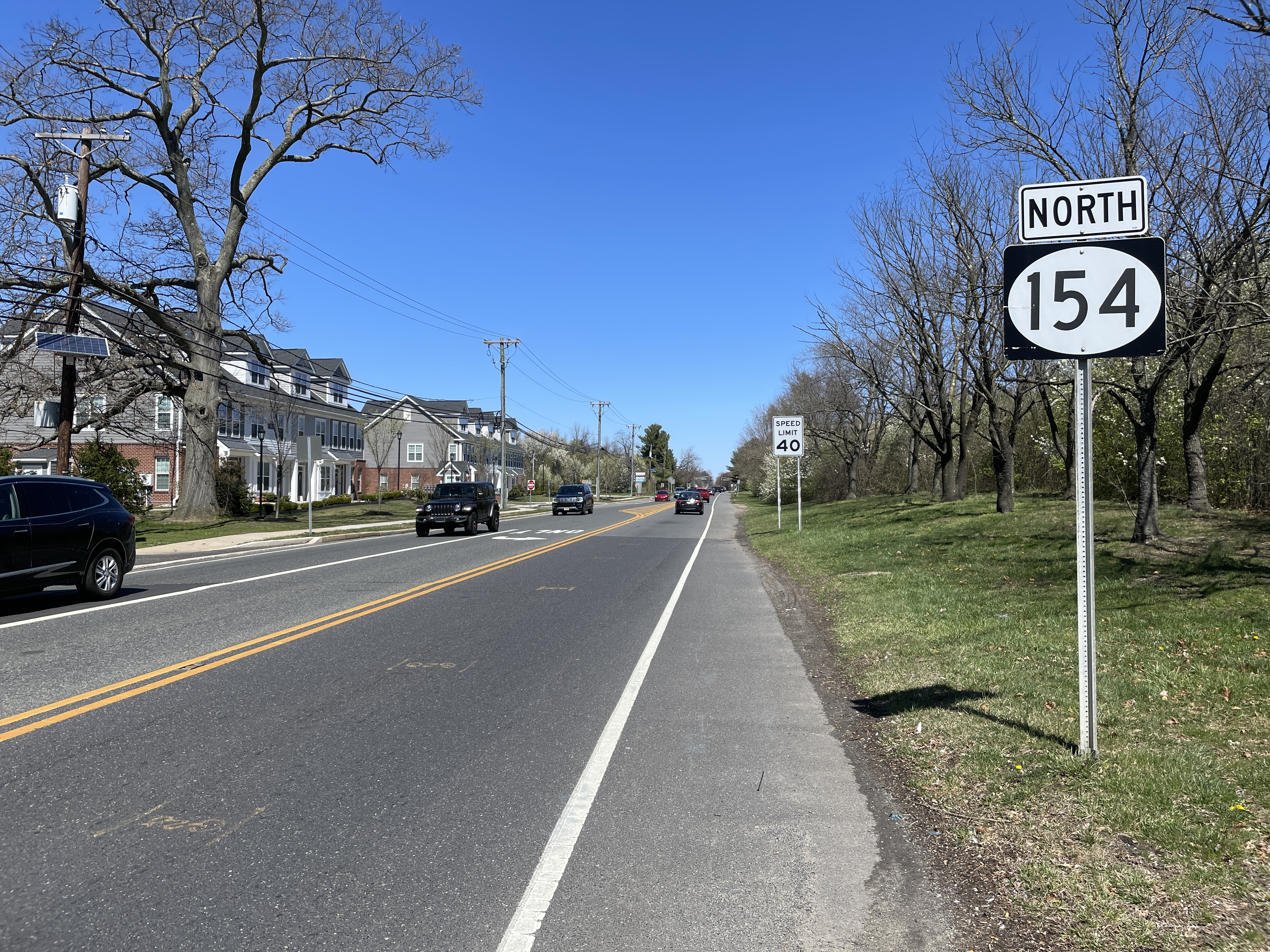
Route 154 northbound past CR 671 in Cherry Hill

The alignment of Route 154 was originally a stretch of Route 41 through Cherry Hill and Ellisburg assigned in the 1927 renumbering of state highways. The route went from its current alignment along former Route 25 to current Route 154 instead of via the Kings Highway. The route remained intact until plans for a bypass around Haddonfield arose in 1929. By the second state highway renumbering in 1953, the bypass around Haddonfield had only been partially built, so instead, the New Jersey State Highway Department realigned Route 41 onto the Kings Highway, leaving the former route unnumbered. The route remained unnumbered until the 1960s, when it was given the designation of Route 154.

In 1938, the State Highway Department tore down the Ellisburg General Store, a market located at the intersection of then-Route 41 and Route 40 (now Route 70) to construct a new traffic circle at the junction. This circle, known as the Ellisburg Circle, was removed in 1992, while plans arose in the late 1980s to remove the congested circle, hosting the junctions of Route 154, 41, and 70. The impetus to remove the structure and replace it with a four-way intersection was produced in 1987, with a cost of $8 million (1987 USD) to rebuild.

== Major intersections ==
The entire route is in Cherry Hill, Camden County.

mi	km	Destinations	Notes
0.00	0.00	CR 561 (Haddonfield–Berlin Road) – Berlin, Haddonfield	Southern terminus
1.58	2.54	Route 41 south / CR 573 south (Kings Highway) – Haddonfield	Southern end of Route 41 concurrency; northern terminus of CR 573
1.70	2.74	Route 41 north (Kings Highway) / Route 70 (Marlton Pike)	Former Ellisburg Circle; northern terminus; northern end of Route 41 concurrency
1.000 mi = 1.609 km; 1.000 km = 0.621 mi: Concurrency terminus
