= Camp Merritt Memorial Monument =

Monument and park in New Jersey, U.S.

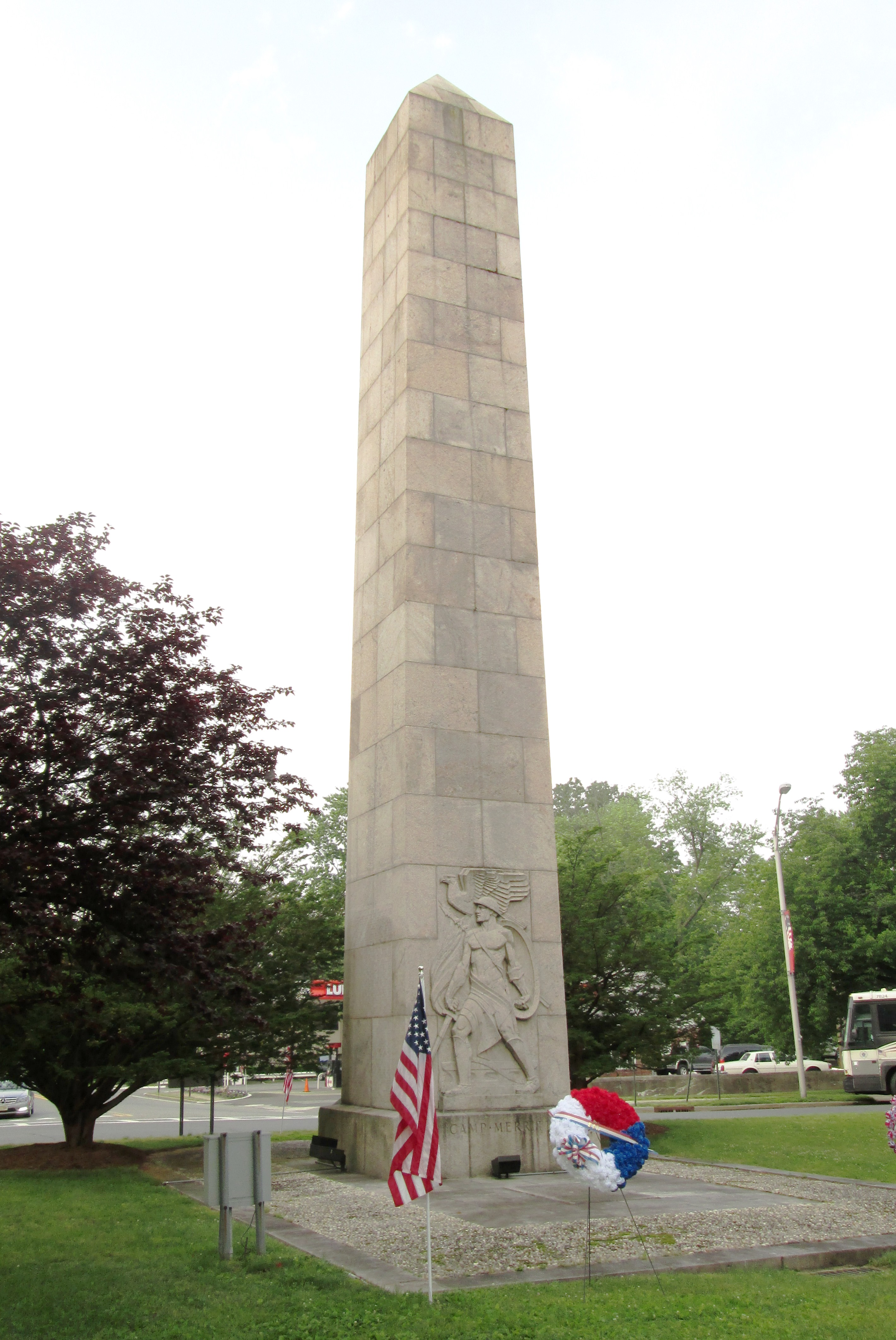
- (2016)
- Interactive map of Camp Merritt Memorial Monument
- Location: CR 505 and Madison Avenue; Cresskill–Dumont, New Jersey
- Coordinates: 40.9413°N 73.9768°W
- Material: granite
- Height: 65 feet (20 m)
- Completion date: 1924
- Opening date: May 30, 1924
- Dedicated to: Camp Merritt
- Website: https://www.journeythroughjersey.com/sites/camp-merritt-memorial-monument/

The Camp Merritt Memorial Monument is dedicated to the soldiers who passed through Camp Merritt, New Jersey on their way to fight in Europe in World War I, especially the 578 people – 15 officers, 573 enlisted men, four nurses and one civilian – who died at the camp due to the worldwide influenza epidemic of 1918, whose names are inscribed at the base of the monument. The memorial is located at the center of the traffic circle on the borders of Cresskill and Dumont in Bergen County, New Jersey, at the intersection of Madison Avenue and Knickerbocker Road (CR 505). Camp Merritt was a major embarkation camp which processed more than a million soldiers, and the monument marks its center. Bergen County purchased the property for the site of the monument in 1919.

== Background ==
The monument, which is a replica of the Washington Monument, is a 66-foot (20 m) tall obelisk, constructed of Stony Creek granite by the Harrison Granite Company. It features a large carved relief sculpted by Robert Ingersoll Aitken, which portrays a World War I doughboy with an eagle above it. An inscription on the south side states that the obelisk "marks the center of the camp and faces the highway over which more than a million American soldiers passed on their way to and from the World War, 1917–1919." Near the monument on a large boulder is a copper plaque designed by Katherine Lamb Tait which has a relief of the Palisades, and in the ground is a dimensional stone carving of a map of Camp Merritt.

The memorial monument was dedicated on Memorial Day, May 30, 1924. General John "Black Jack" Pershing, Commander-in-Chief of the American Expeditionary Force, gave the dedication address to an estimated audience of 20,000 people. Other speakers included the Governor of New Jersey, George S. Silzer. Mrs. Laura Williams Merritt, the widow of Major General Wesley Merritt, for whom the camp was named, was in attendance as well. The President at the time, Calvin Coolidge, was also invited to the event, but declined due to other obligations.

== Gallery ==
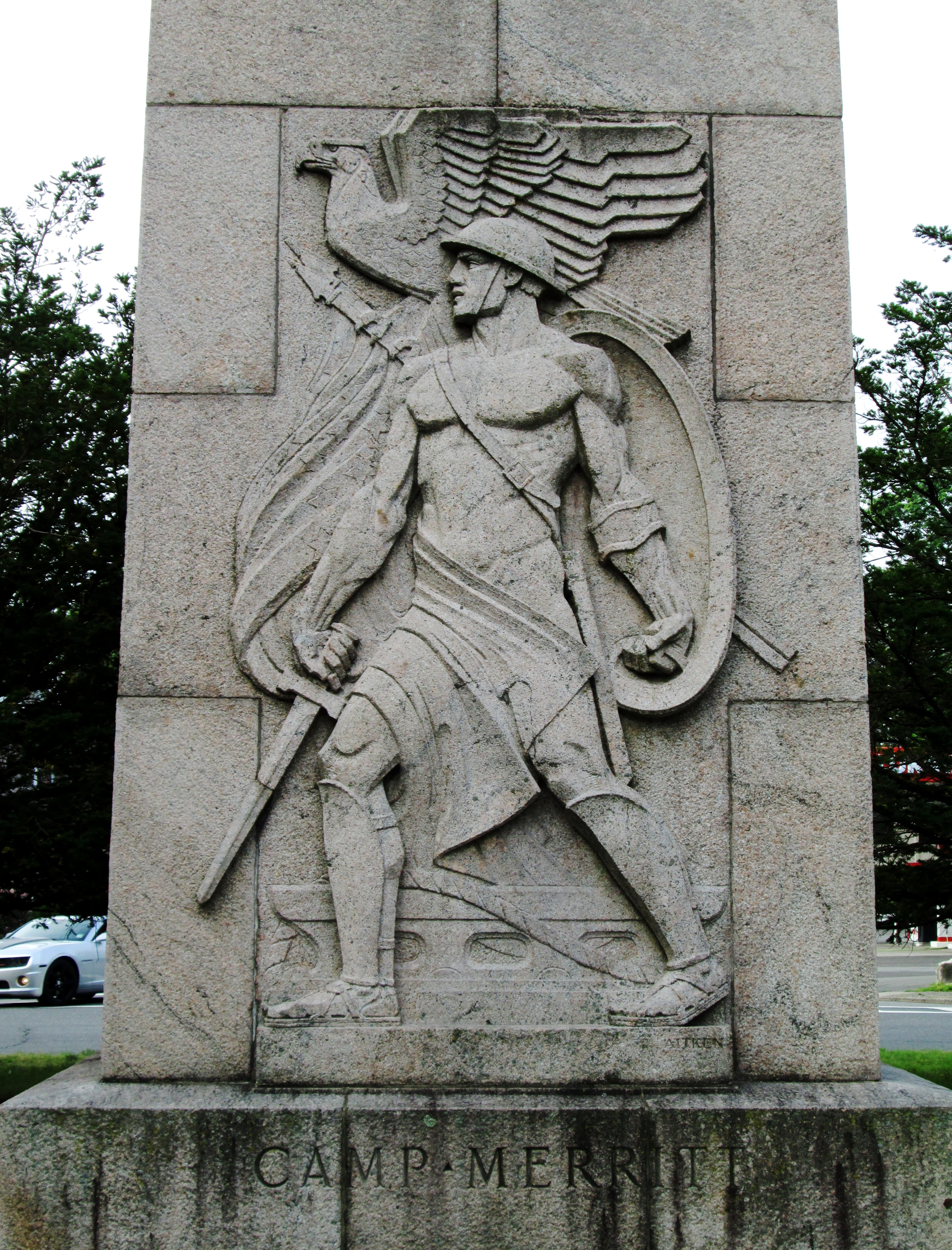
Relief by Robert Ingersoll Aitken at the base of the obelisk

== See also ==
- List of traffic circles in New Jersey
