= Airport Circle (Pennsauken, New Jersey) =

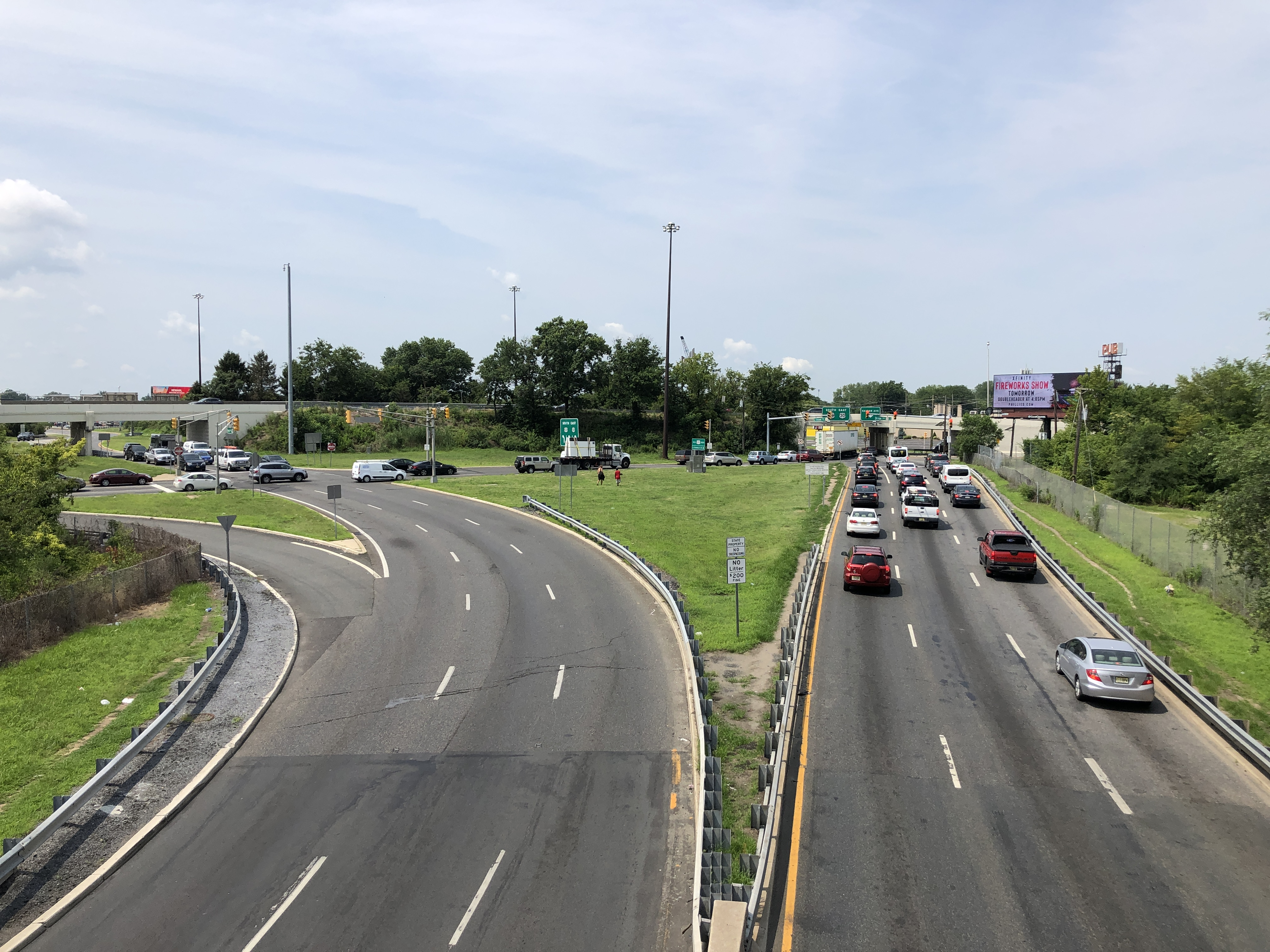
- View of Airport Circle from the US 30 westbound bridge over US 130
- Interactive map of Airport Circle

Location
- Pennsauken, New Jersey
- Coordinates: 39.9335°N 75.0825°W
- Roads at junction: US 30; US 130; Route 38; CR 607 (Kaighns Avenue)

Construction
- Type: Traffic circle

The Airport Circle is a traffic circle in Pennsauken, New Jersey, United States. It is located at the intersection of Route 38, US 30, and US 130, close to the Camden border. South of the circle, US 30 and US 130 run concurrently until they reach the former Collingswood Circle in Collingswood. The Airport Circle opened in 1927 and is the first of is kind in the United States. It is named for Camden Central Airport whose terminal building was located beside the circle, to the south-east. The circle has been modified to include traffic lights and ramps to help ease traffic congestion.

== Description ==
The Airport Circle is located in Pennsauken in Camden County, east of Camden. The circle serves as the intersection between US 30, US 130, Route 38, and Kaighns Avenue (CR 607). From the circle, US 130 heads northeasterly on six-lane divided highway called Crescent Boulevard, US 30 continues westward onto six-lane divided Admiral Wilson Boulevard, CR 607 runs westerly along two-lane undivided Kaighns Avenue, US 30/US 130 continues southward on six-lane divided Crescent Boulevard, and Route 38 heads to the easterly as a six-lane divided road, coming to an interchange with Route 70 a short distance later. All five roadways have ramps that feed into the circle itself, with traffic lights that govern movements at the ramps from westbound Route 38, southbound US 130, and eastbound US 30 and a stop sign at the ramp from Kaighns Avenue. The ramp from westbound US 30/northbound US 130 merges into the main circle. The mainline of US 130 passes through the circle. There are flyover ramps that carry the mainline of US 30 through the circle. The eastbound US 30 ramp heads into the center of the circle, where a ramp for eastbound Route 38 splits and continues east over the circle to connect to that route. Eastbound US 30 merges with southbound US 130 in the median of that route. The flyover ramp carrying westbound US 30 forks to the right from northbound US 130 and heads to the east of the circle, passing over Route 38 before coming to a ramp connecting westbound Route 38 to westbound US 30. The ramp heads over US 130, with a ramp from the southbound direction of that route, before continuing west and merging with the ramp to US 30 westbound from the center of the circle. To the north of the circle is a residential neighborhood while the Airport Industrial Park is to the southeast. Other commercial and industrial establishments surround the circle to the northeast and west.

== History ==
Built in 1925, the Airport Circle is New Jersey's first traffic circle. The circle opened to traffic on July 1, 1927, as the first such traffic rotary in the United States. It is named for the former Camden Central Airport, an airport that operated in this vicinity between 1929 and 1957. The Airport Circle was later modified to include overhead ramps and traffic lights to move traffic through.

The world's first drive-in theater opened June 6, 1933, on Admiral Wilson Boulevard at Airport Circle a short distance from Cooper River Park.

== See also ==
- List of traffic circles in New Jersey
