= New Jersey Route 73 =

State highway in southern, New Jersey, US

Route 73
- NJ 73 highlighted in red

Route information
- Maintained by NJDOT, Burlington County Bridge Commission, and Atlantic and Camden counties
- Length: 34.64 mi (55.75 km)
- Existed: January 1, 1953–present

Major junctions
- South end: US 322 in Folsom
- Route 54 in Folsom; A.C. Expressway in Winslow Township; US 30 in Waterford Township; Route 70 in Evesham Township; N.J. Turnpike in Mount Laurel; I-295 in Mount Laurel; Route 38 / Route 41 in Maple Shade Township; Route 90 in Cinnaminson Township; US 130 in Pennsauken Township
- North end: PA 73 at the Pennsylvania state line in Palmyra

Location
- Country: United States
- State: New Jersey
- Counties: Atlantic, Camden, Burlington

Highway system
- New Jersey State Highway Routes; Interstate; US; State; Scenic Byways
← Route 72	→ Route 74

Route 73 is a state highway in the southern part of the U.S. state of New Jersey. It runs 34.64 mi (55.75 km) as an outer bypass of the Camden area from an intersection with U.S. Route 322 (US 322) in Folsom, Atlantic County, north to the Tacony–Palmyra Bridge in Palmyra, Burlington County, where the road continues into Philadelphia, Pennsylvania, as Pennsylvania Route 73 (PA 73). South of the interchange with the Atlantic City Expressway in Winslow Township, Camden County, Route 73 is a two-lane undivided county-maintained road and is signed as County Route 561 Spur (CR 561 Spur), a spur of CR 561. North of the Atlantic City Expressway, the route is maintained by the New Jersey Department of Transportation (NJDOT) and is mostly four lanes, with the portion north of the CR 561 concurrency a divided highway. North of the US 30 interchange near Berlin, Route 73 runs through suburban areas of the Philadelphia metropolitan area, intersecting Route 70 in Marlton, the New Jersey Turnpike and Interstate 295 (I-295) in Mount Laurel, Route 38 and Route 41 in Maple Shade Township, Route 90 in Cinnaminson Township, and US 130 in Pennsauken Township.

What is today Route 73 between the Tacony–Palmyra Bridge and Berlin was legislated as Route S41 in 1927, a spur of Route . An extension of this spur called Route S41A was designated in 1938 to continue south from Berlin to Route 42 (now US 322) in Folsom. In 1953, both these routes became Route 73 in order to match PA 73. The portion of Route 73 between Berlin and the Atlantic City Expressway became a state highway by 1969. By the 2000s, Route 73 was extended south along CR 561 Spur to US 322. Several traffic circles along Route 73 have been modified or replaced over time. Among these was the Berlin Circle, which was turned into an at-grade intersection in 2006. The Marlton Circle at Route 70, which was modified in 1974 to allow Route 73 to pass through the circle, was replaced with an interchange completed in 2011.

== Route description ==
=== US 322 to Atlantic City Expressway ===
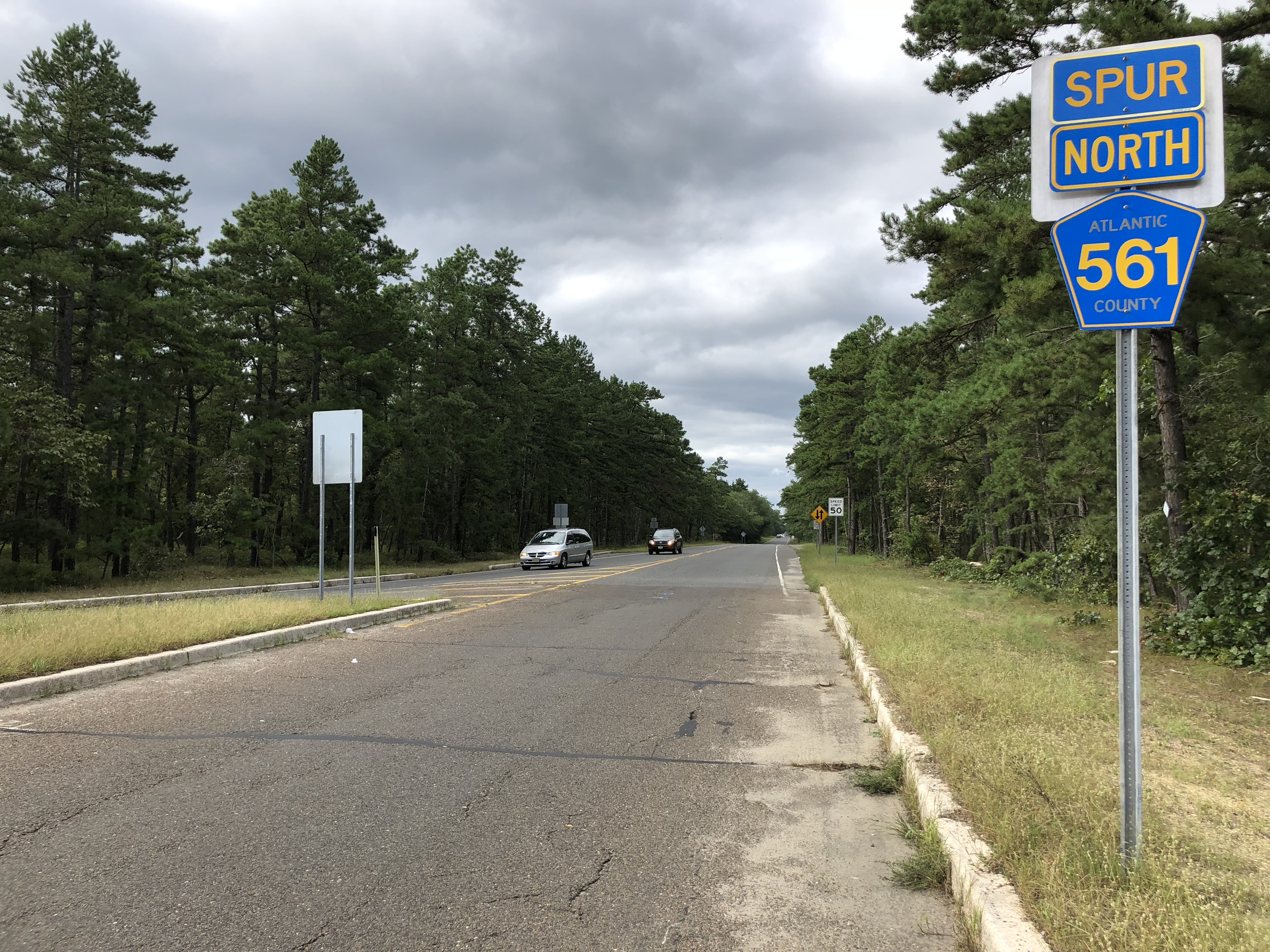
Route 73 northbound just north of US 322 in Folsom, signed as CR 561 Spur

County Route 561 Spur
- Location: Folsom–Winslow Township
- Length: 8.50 mi (13.68 km)
- Existed: 1952–present

Route 73 begins at an intersection with US 322 (Black Horse Pike) in Folsom, Atlantic County, heading to the northwest on Blue Anchor Road, a two-lane undivided county-maintained road signed as CR 561 Spur. This portion of the route is officially considered a part of Route 73 but is not signed as such, with signs directing motorists north on CR 561 Spur to reach Route 73. The road runs through forested areas of the Pine Barrens with some homes and farms, coming to a crossroads with Route 54. Following this intersection, the road continues northwest as Mays Landing Road, crossing the Beesleys Point Secondary railroad line operated by the Cape May Seashore Lines railroad at-grade. It enters a small corner of Hammonton before it heads into Winslow Township in Camden County. Here, Route 73 crosses the Southern Railroad of New Jersey's Southern Running Track railroad line at-grade and intersects CR 725. From this point, the road heads north to a partial interchange with the Atlantic City Expressway that has access from southbound Route 73 to the eastbound Atlantic City Expressway and from the westbound Atlantic City Expressway to northbound Route 73.

=== Atlantic City Expressway to Route 70 ===
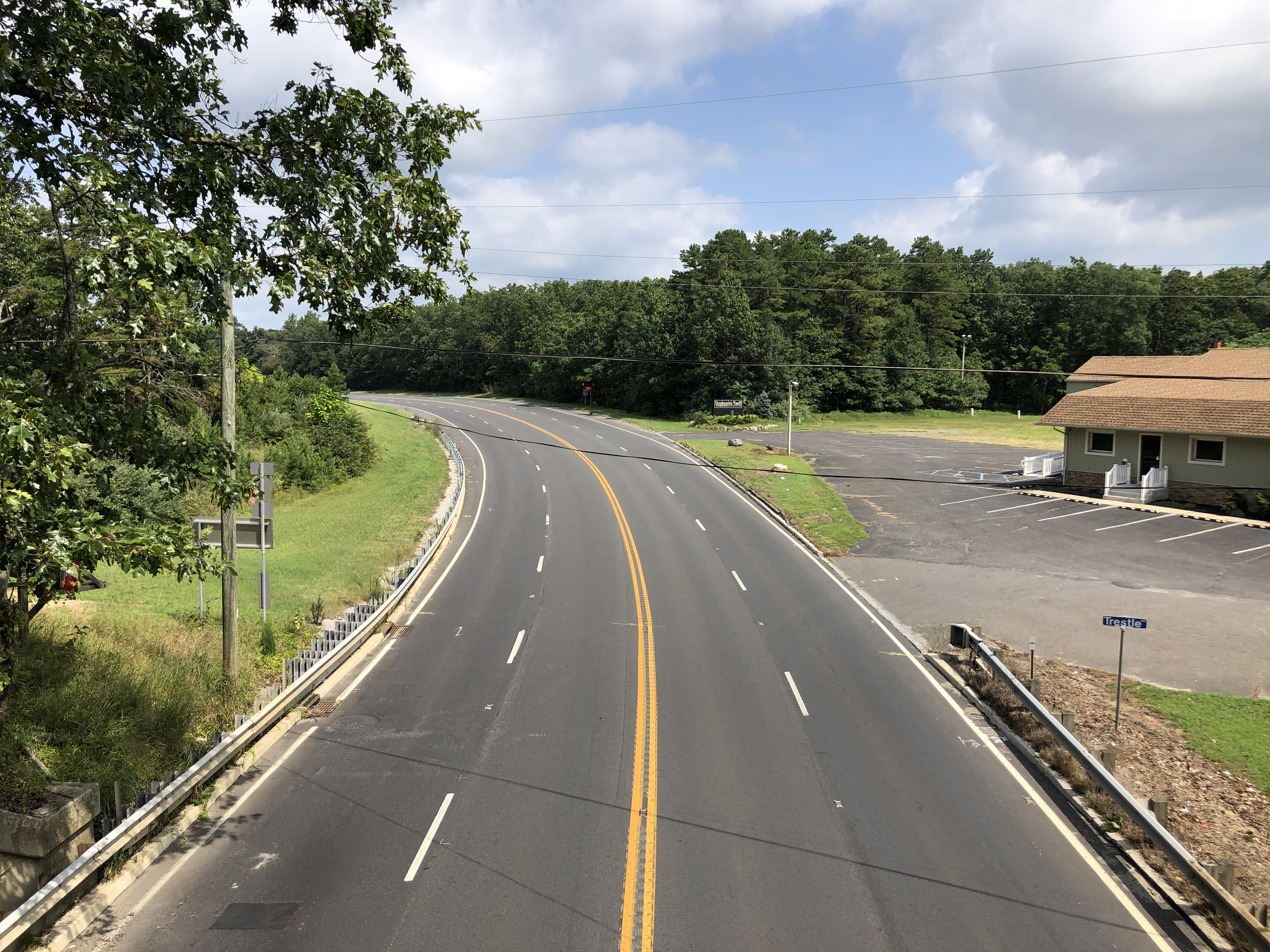
Route 73 and CR 561 Spur northbound in Winslow Township

After the Atlantic City Expressway, Route 73 becomes officially signed and maintained by NJDOT, although CR 561 Spur is still signed along the route. It heads to the north as a four-lane undivided road, passing through wooded areas with some residences and businesses and crosses CR 723, which provides access to the westbound Atlantic City Expressway and from the eastbound Atlantic City Expressway. The route continues to an intersection with CR 561, where it briefly widens into a four-lane divided highway. At this junction, CR 561 Spur ends and Route 73 forms a concurrency with CR 561. The road intersects CR 722 and CR 721, becoming Camden Road at the latter junction. It heads north through more rural areas, meeting CR 720. CR 561C, a former segment of CR 561, splits from Route 73 by heading north through the community of Cedar Brook while Route 73 and CR 561 bypass the community to the east, crossing under Conrail Shared Assets Operations' (CSAO) Beesleys Point Secondary railroad line.

North of Cedar Brook, the route traverses CR 536, becoming Cedarbrook Road. It intersects CR 680 and CR 711 before widening into a divided highway prior to a junction where CR 712 heads northeast and CR 561 splits from Route 73 by heading north on Cedarbrook Road. Past this intersection, Route 73 becomes an unnamed road and encounters CR 710 at a four-way intersection. A short distance later, the route enters Waterford Township and comes to a modified cloverleaf interchange with US 30 (White Horse Pike) and CR 536 Spur.

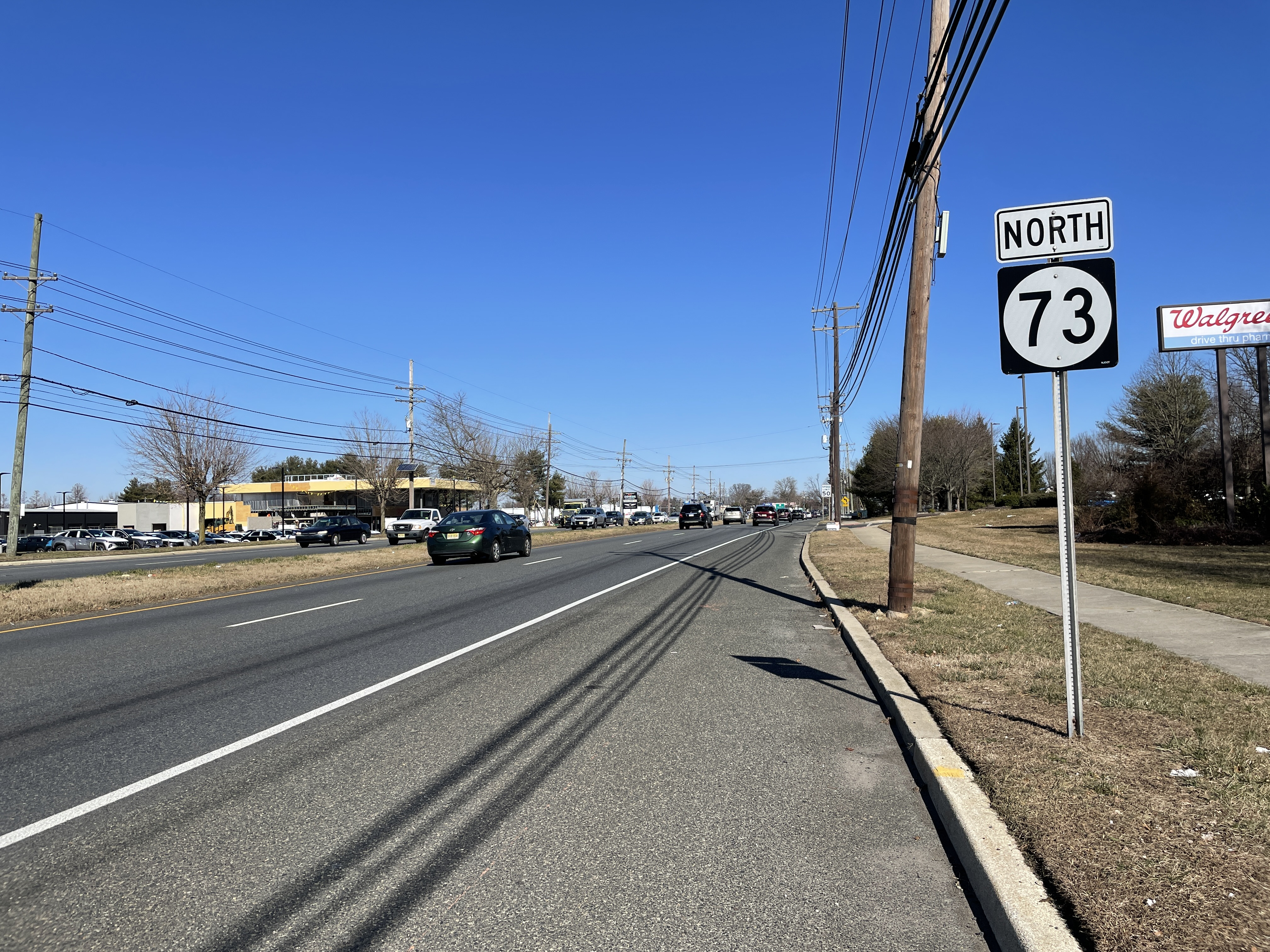
View north along Route 73 at Brick Road in Evesham Township

Following US 30, Route 73 passes through a small corner of Berlin Boro before it crosses under NJ Transit's Atlantic City Line west of the Atco station. At the railroad underpass, the route enters Berlin Township and meets CR 534 at a crossroad. After the intersection with this route, the road proceeds back into Berlin Boro, where the route runs through a mix of residences and businesses. Route 73 widens to a six-lane highway and comes to the former Berlin Circle, where it meets both CR 689 and CR 708. From here, the road turns north and reenters Berlin Township as a four-lane divided highway, continuing through developed areas and intersecting CR 692. Prior to the junction with CR 693, the route enters Voorhees Township, where it encounters CR 675 before passing east of Virtua Voorhees Hospital.

At the intersection with CR 671, Route 73 comes into Evesham Township, Burlington County. In Evesham, it heads to a junction with CR 544 before coming to Marlton, where it passes west of The Promenade at Sagemore shopping center and Virtua Marlton Hospital before turning northwest at CR 607. The route intersects CR 600 and CR 620 before meeting Route 70 at a partial cloverleaf interchange that was formerly the Marlton Circle.

=== Route 70 to Tacony–Palmyra Bridge ===
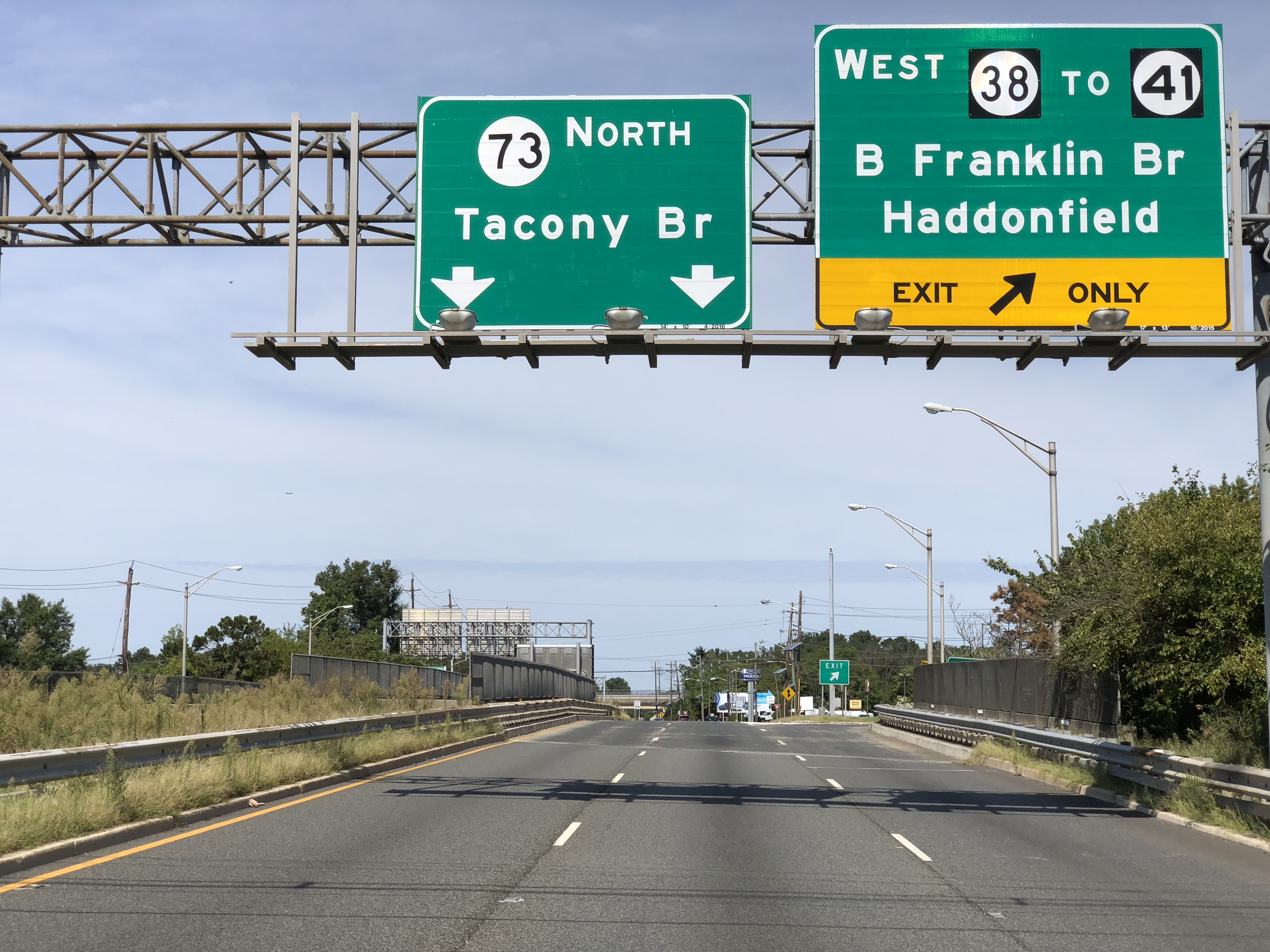
Route 73 northbound at the interchange with Route 38 in Maple Shade Township

Past the Route 70 interchange, Route 73 continues through suburban commercial areas, crossing the unsigned CR 674, and heading into Mount Laurel. The route comes to an intersection with CR 616, where it turns to the northwest. A short distance later, the road has a double trumpet interchange with the New Jersey Turnpike. Following this interchange, Route 73 widens into a six-lane divided highway and encounters CR 673 before coming to a cloverleaf interchange with I-295. From the I-295 interchange, the route goes into Maple Shade Township. Route 73 comes to two exits for Route 38 and Route 41 within a short distance of each other. After Route 41, the road intersects CR 610 and bypasses the center of Maple Shade to the east as a four-lane divided highway. The route has an interchange with CR 537 and runs under CSAO's Pemberton Industrial Track railroad line before turning northwest and paralleling the North Branch of the Pennsauken Creek, meeting CR 609.

Route 73 enters Cinnaminson Township, where the Route 90 freeway splits from the road before crossing over the South Branch of the Pennsauken Creek into Pennsauken Township, Camden County. In Pennsauken, the route has exits with CR 644 and US 130. Route 73 briefly enters Cinnaminson Township, Burlington County, again before crossing into Palmyra at the bridge over the Pennsauken Creek. In Palmyra, the road has an interchange with CR 543 before running under NJ Transit's River Line. The route comes to the intersection with Temple Boulevard, where it becomes maintained by the Burlington County Bridge Commission and comes to the northbound toll plaza for the Tacony–Palmyra Bridge. A short distance later, the road traverses the Delaware River on the Tacony–Palmyra Bridge, a combination steel tied-arch bridge and drawbridge with two northbound lanes and one southbound lane, where it continues into Philadelphia, Pennsylvania, as PA 73. The Tacony–Palmyra Bridge was designed by Ralph Modjeski, who also engineered the Benjamin Franklin Bridge and the Manhattan Bridge, that opened to traffic in 1929, replacing a ferry service across the Delaware River.

Route 73 serves as a main road in South Jersey that helps provide access between the Philadelphia area and the southern part of the Jersey Shore as well as connections to several local roads. It has been rated one of the worst roads in the state in terms of traffic, accidents, and driver aggression.

== History ==
Route S41
- Location: Berlin–Palmyra
- Existed: 1927–1953

Route S41A
- Location: Folsom–Berlin
- Existed: 1938–1953

In the 1927 New Jersey state highway renumbering, a spur of Route 41 called Route S41 was legislated to run from the Tacony–Palmyra Bridge south to Berlin along what is today Route 73. A southern extension of Route S41 called Route S41A was proposed to run from Berlin south to Route 42 (now US 322) in Folsom in 1938. In the 1953 New Jersey state highway renumbering, Route S41 and Route S41A were renumbered to Route 73 in order to match PA 73. With the establishment of the 500-series county routes in 1952, the current alignment of Route 73 between Berlin and Blue Anchor became a part of CR 561 while it became CR 561 Spur between Blue Anchor and Folsom. By 1969, Route 73 was designated south of Berlin along CR 561 and CR 561 Spur to the Atlantic City Expressway. By the 2000s, Route 73 was extended south along with CR 561 Spur from the Atlantic City Expressway to US 322.

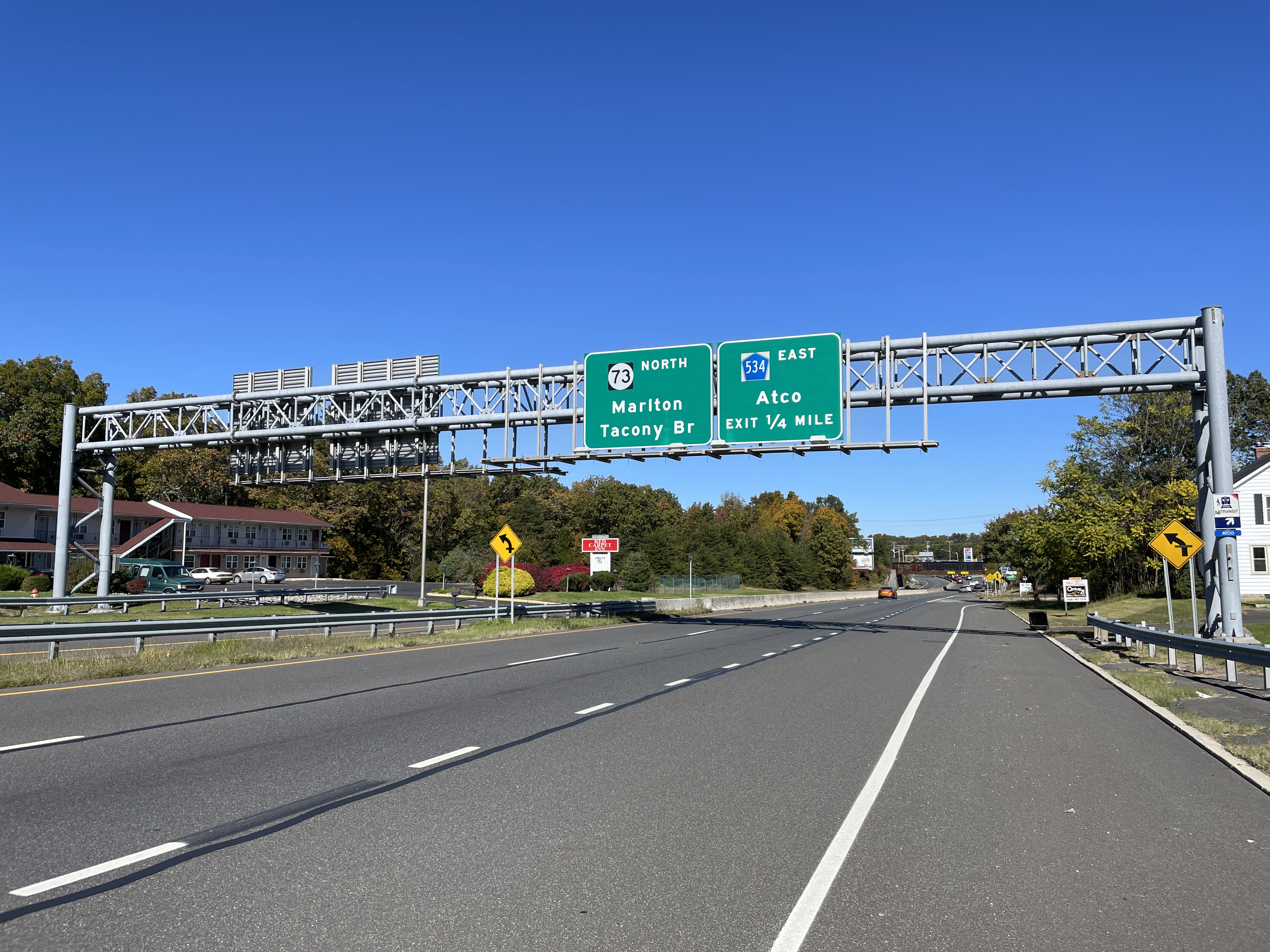
Route 73 northbound approaching CR 534 in Berlin

Over the years, several traffic circles have been modified or replaced along Route 73. The Marlton Circle at Route 70 in Marlton was modified in 1974 to allow Route 73 to run directly straight through the circle. This circle became known for traffic backups and was replaced with an interchange. Construction on this interchange, which cost $31 million, began in April 2009. In May 2010, the circle was eliminated with a temporary at-grade intersection constructed while the Route 73 bridge over Route 70 was being built. The interchange was completed in June 2011. A traffic circle that existed at the intersection of Route 38 and Route 41 in Maple Shade Township was removed by the 1960s and replaced by the current set of interchanges. In addition, the Berlin Circle in Berlin was replaced by an at-grade intersection between August 2005 and September 2006 at a cost of $73 million.

== Major intersections ==
County	Location	mi	km	Destinations	Notes
Atlantic	Folsom	0.00	0.00	US 322 (Black Horse Pike) – Atlantic City, Camden CR 561 Spur begins	Southern terminus; southern terminus of CR 561 Spur
Atlantic	Folsom	2.40	3.86	Route 54 (12th Street) to A.C. Expressway – Buena, Hammonton	
Camden	Winslow Township	6.06	9.75	A.C. Expressway east – Atlantic City, Wildwood, Shore Points	Southbound exit and northbound entrance; exit 31 on A.C. Expressway
Camden	Winslow Township	8.50	13.68	CR 561 south (Egg Harbor Road) – Hammonton CR 561 Spur ends	Southern end of CR 561 concurrency; northern terminus of CR 561 Spur
Camden	Winslow Township	13.22	21.28	CR 561 north (Tansboro Road) – Tansboro	Northern end of CR 561 concurrency
Camden	Waterford Township	15.50	24.94	US 30 (White Horse Pike) – Berlin, Camden, Atco, Hammonton	Interchange
Camden	Berlin Township	16.04	25.81	CR 534 (Jackson Road) – Berlin, Atco	
Burlington	Evesham Township	22.80	36.69	CR 544 (Evesham Road / Marlton Parkway)	
Burlington	Evesham Township	24.13	38.83	Route 70 – Cherry Hill, Medford	Interchange; former Marlton Circle
Burlington	Mount Laurel	27.10	43.61	N.J. Turnpike – New York, Delaware	Exit 4 on N.J. Turnpike
Burlington	Mount Laurel	27.68	44.55	I-295 – Delaware Memorial Bridge, Trenton	Exit 36 on I-295
Burlington	Maple Shade Township	28.55	45.95	Route 38 / Route 41 – Moorestown, Mount Holly, Haddonfield, Camden, Benjamin Franklin Bridge	Interchange
Burlington	Maple Shade Township	28.82	46.38	Route 41 south – Haddonfield	Interchange; no northbound exit
Burlington	Maple Shade Township	29.68	47.77	CR 537 (Main Street) – Maple Shade, Moorestown	Interchange
Burlington	Cinnaminson Township	31.44	50.60	Route 90 west – Pennsauken, Betsy Ross Bridge	Interchange; northbound exit and southbound entrance; eastern terminus of Route 90
Camden	Pennsauken Township	32.18	51.79	US 130 – Cinnaminson, Trenton, Pennsauken, Camden	Interchange
Burlington	Palmyra	33.24	53.49	CR 543 (River Road) – Camden, Palmyra, Riverton	Interchange
Delaware River		34.64	55.75	Tacony–Palmyra Bridge (northbound toll; cash or E-ZPass)	
Delaware River		34.64	55.75	PA 73 west – Philadelphia	Continuation into Pennsylvania
1.000 mi = 1.609 km; 1.000 km = 0.621 mi: Concurrency terminus; Incomplete access; Tolled
