= Tacony–Palmyra Bridge =

Bridge connecting Pennsylvania and New Jersey

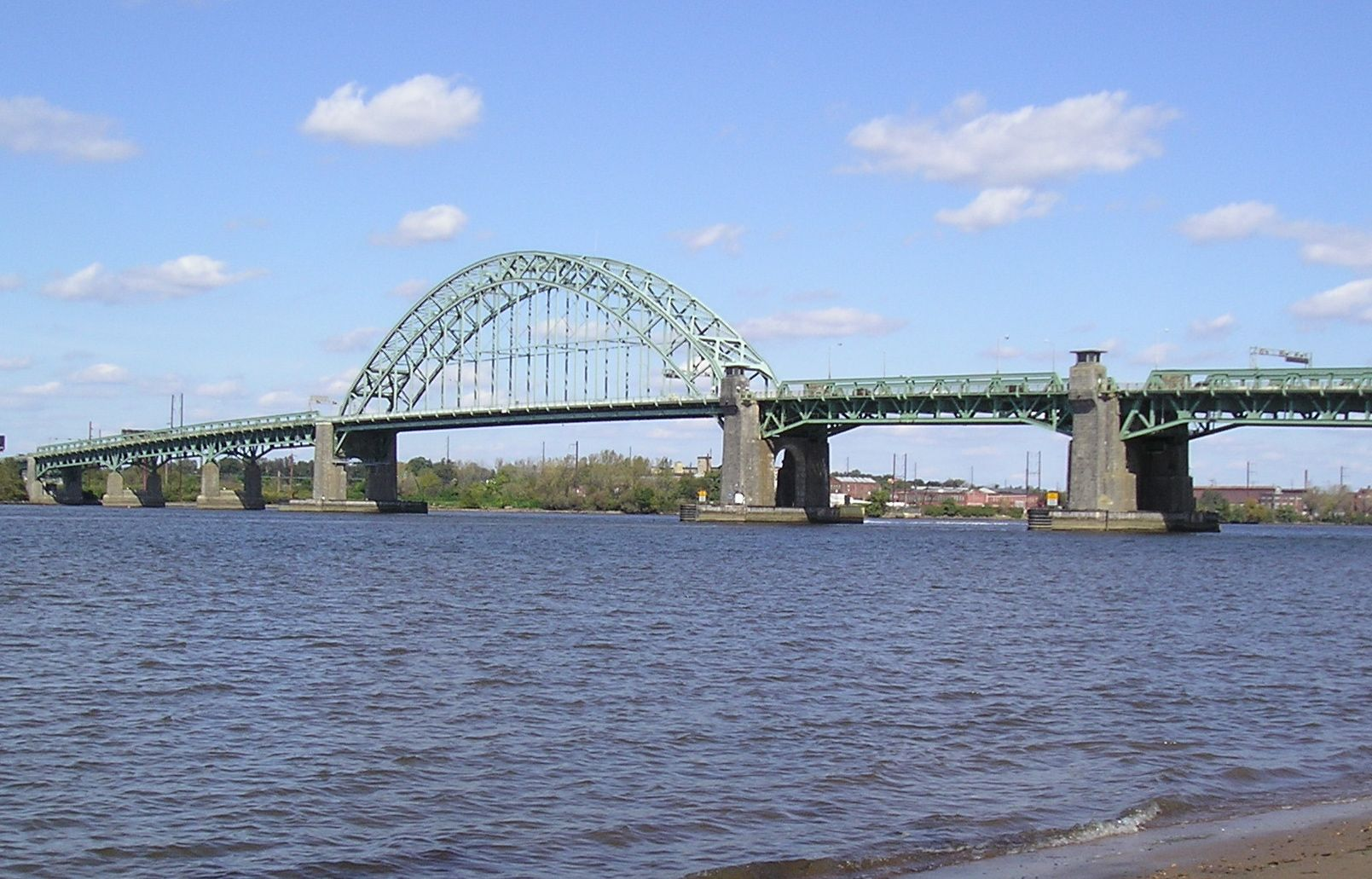
- Bridge as seen from the New Jersey shoreline
- Coordinates: 40.01199°N 75.04298°W
- Carries: 3 lanes of PA 73 (PA side) / Route 73 (NJ side), pedestrians and bicycles
- Crosses: Delaware River
- Locale: Philadelphia (Tacony), Pennsylvania and Palmyra, New Jersey
- Official name: Tacony–Palmyra Bridge
- Maintained by: Burlington County Bridge Commission
- ID number: 3000001 (NJ), 677301999100150 (PA)

Characteristics
- Design: Steel tied arch bridge with bascule opening
- Total length: 3,659 ft (1,115 m)
- Width: 38 ft (12 m)
- Longest span: 558 ft (170 m)
- Clearance above: 14.5 ft (4.4 m)
- Clearance below: 61 ft (19 m) (arch), 54 ft (16 m) (bascule)

History
- Opened: August 14, 1929; 97 years ago

Statistics
- Daily traffic: 50,000 (1999)
- Toll: $4.00 cash or $3.00 E-ZPass (westbound only)

Location
- Interactive map of Tacony–Palmyra Bridge

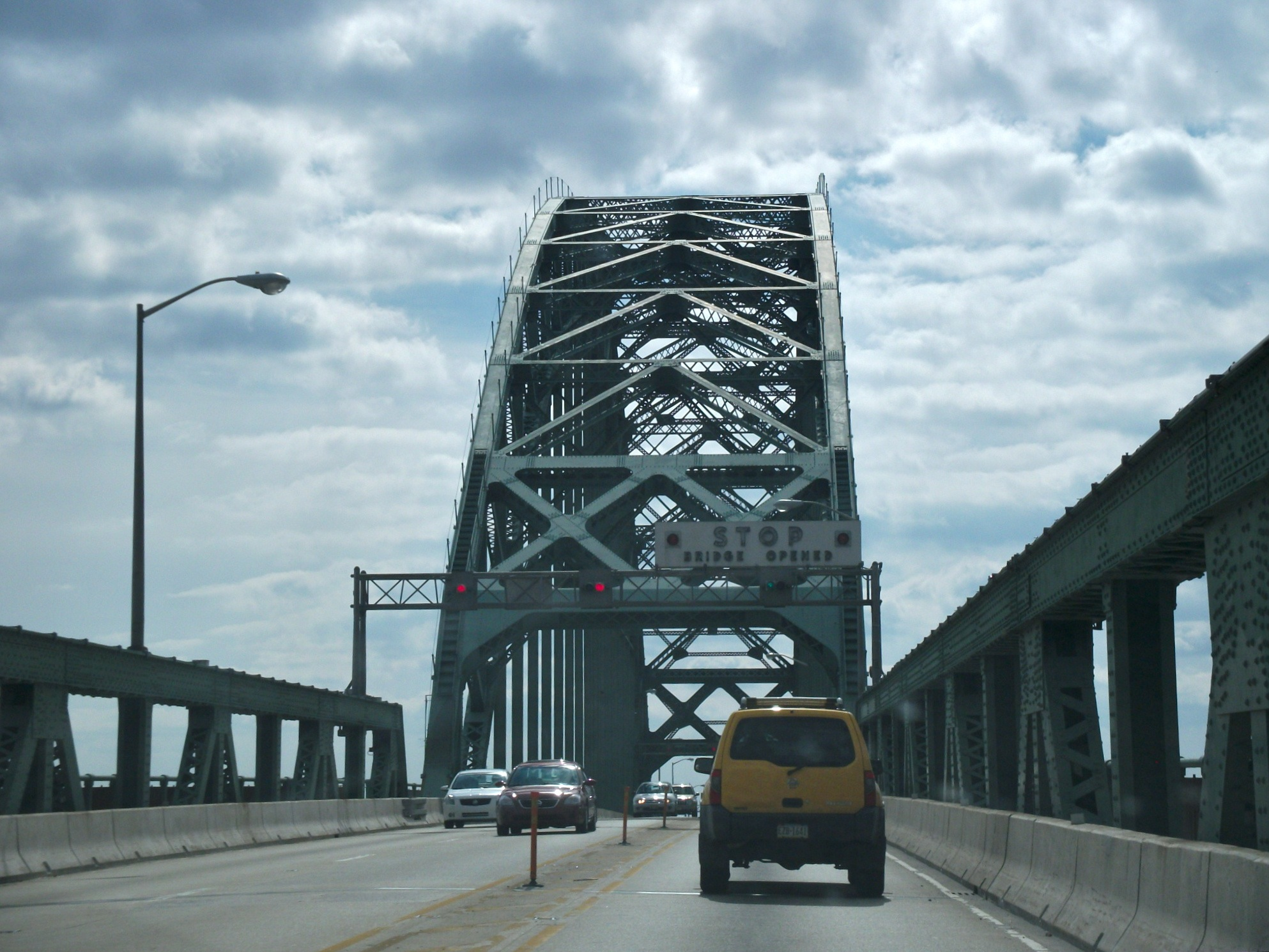
View from the roadway of the Tacony-Palmyra Bridge, across the upper Delaware River from Palmyra, New Jersey to Tacony section of Philadelphia with drawbridge signs

The Tacony–Palmyra Bridge is a toll bridge across the Delaware River that connects New Jersey Route 73 in Palmyra, New Jersey with Pennsylvania Route 73 in the Tacony neighborhood of Philadelphia. The bridge has a $4 cash toll and $3 E-ZPass toll for westbound (Pennsylvania-bound) traffic. Despite occasional interruptions due to openings for passing ship traffic, it serves as a lower-cost alternative to the more southerly, six-lane, high-span Betsy Ross Bridge, which charges $6 for the westbound crossing.

The combination steel tied-arch and double-leaf bascule bridge was designed by Polish-born architect Ralph Modjeski and completed in 1929. It has a total length of 3,659 feet (1,115 m) and spans 2,324 feet (708 m). The bascule draw span is located immediately east of the main, arched span. There are two westbound lanes, one eastbound land, and a walkway for pedestrian and bicycle traffic. The bridge is owned and maintained by the Burlington County Bridge Commission of New Jersey, which also operates the upstream Burlington–Bristol Bridge.

== History ==
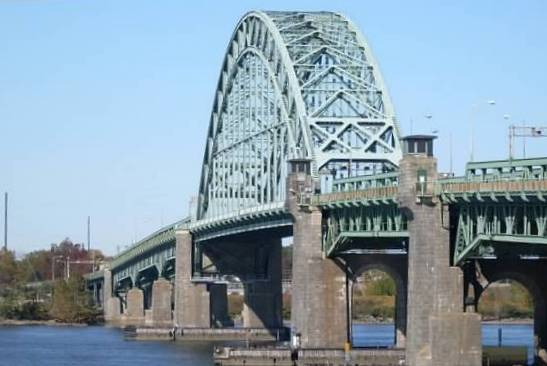
The Tacony–Palmyra Bridge, seen from New Jersey

After one and a half years of construction, the Tacony–Palmyra Bridge opened on August 14, 1929. It replaced ferry service that had operated between Tacony and Palmyra since May 6, 1922.

From 1955 to 1975 the toll was only 5 cents.

Built with four lanes, the bridge was modified in 1997 to have three wider lanes – two westbound towards Philadelphia and one eastbound towards New Jersey.

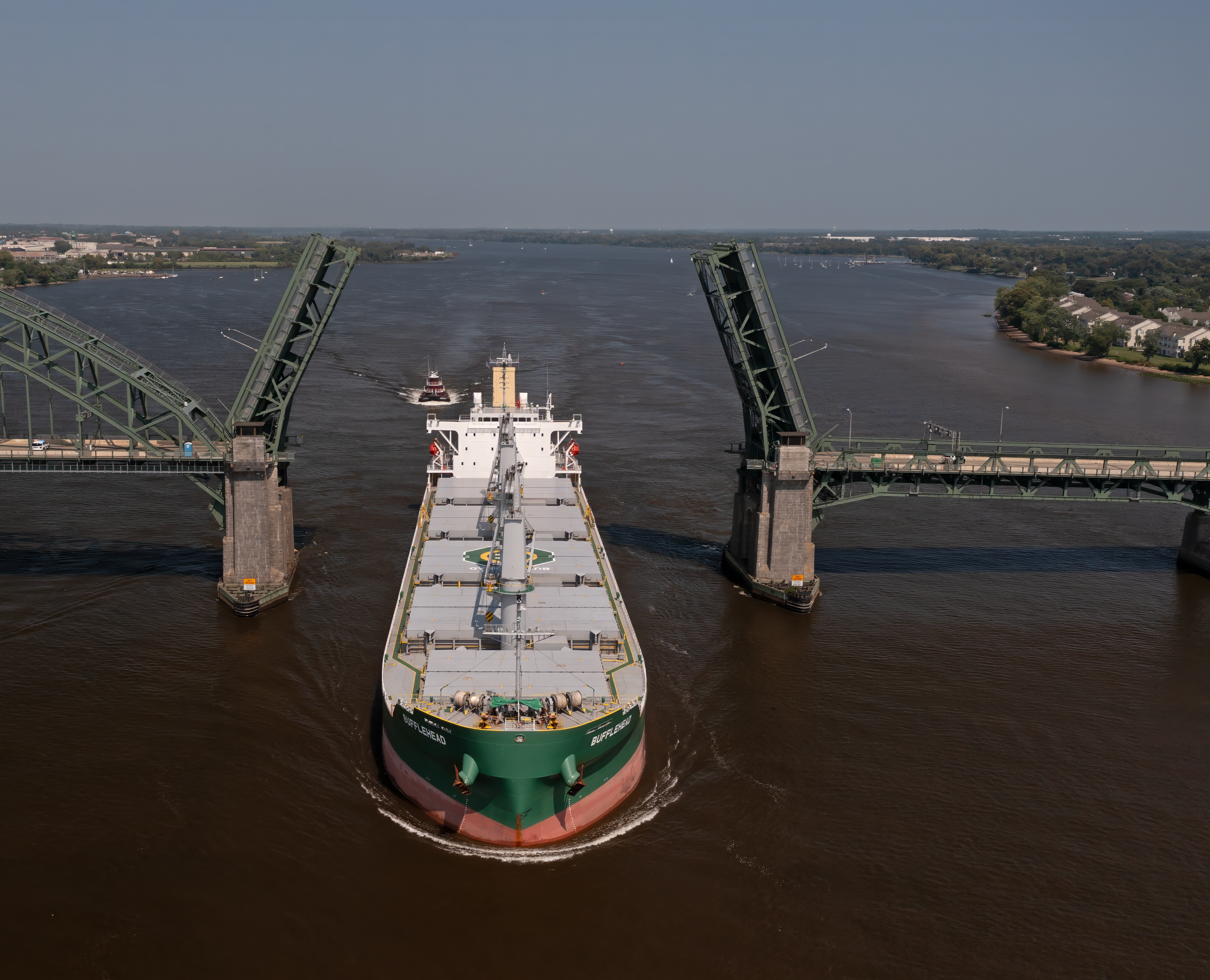
The bulk carrier, Bufflehead, passes through the drawbridge span.

On October 10, 2013, the bascule span jammed and became stuck in the open position when a roller under the maintenance walkway seized, closing the bridge for approximately eleven hours.

In 2016, work began on rehabilitation and improved traffic controls systems, including barriers and traffic lights.

=== 2026 ship collision ===
At around 1:15 p.m. EST on November 12, 2026, the Singaporean-flagged bulk carrier Strategic Alliance collided with the bridge while it was open to marine traffic. The bridge was closed to vehicular traffic immediately after, and the Strategic Alliance was moored at a port facility in Fairless Hills, Pennsylvania to be inspected by the Coast Guard. Crews at the bridge inspected the bridge following the collision, and it was partially reopened to vehicular traffic by 8:40 p.m.

By November 13, the pedestrian crossing and one of the Philadelphia-bound lanes remained closed while bridge crews continued inspecting and repairing the bridge.

== See also ==
- List of crossings of the Delaware River
