= County Route 545 (New Jersey) =

County highway in New Jersey, U.S.

County Route 545
- CR 545 highlighted in red, grey line represents closed section

Route information
- Length: 14.76 mi (23.75 km)

Major junctions
- South end: CR 530 in Pemberton Township
- CR 537 in Springfield Township; Route 68 in Mansfield Township; CR 543 in Mansfield Township; US 206 in Bordentown Township; US 130 in Bordentown Township
- North end: CR 662 in Bordentown

Location
- Country: United States
- State: New Jersey
- Counties: Burlington

Highway system
- County routes in New Jersey; 500-series routes
← CR 544	→ CR 546

County Route 545 (CR 545) is a county highway in the U.S. state of New Jersey. The highway extends 14.76 miles (23.75 km) from Lakehurst Road (CR 530) in Pemberton Township to West Park Street in Bordentown. There is a 3.38-mile (5.44 km) stretch from Pemberton Boulevard at the Pemberton Township/New Hanover border to Rexall Avenue in Wrightstown that is permanently closed to the general public because of security restrictions on the Fort Dix entity of Joint Base McGuire–Dix–Lakehurst (JB MDL).

== Route description ==
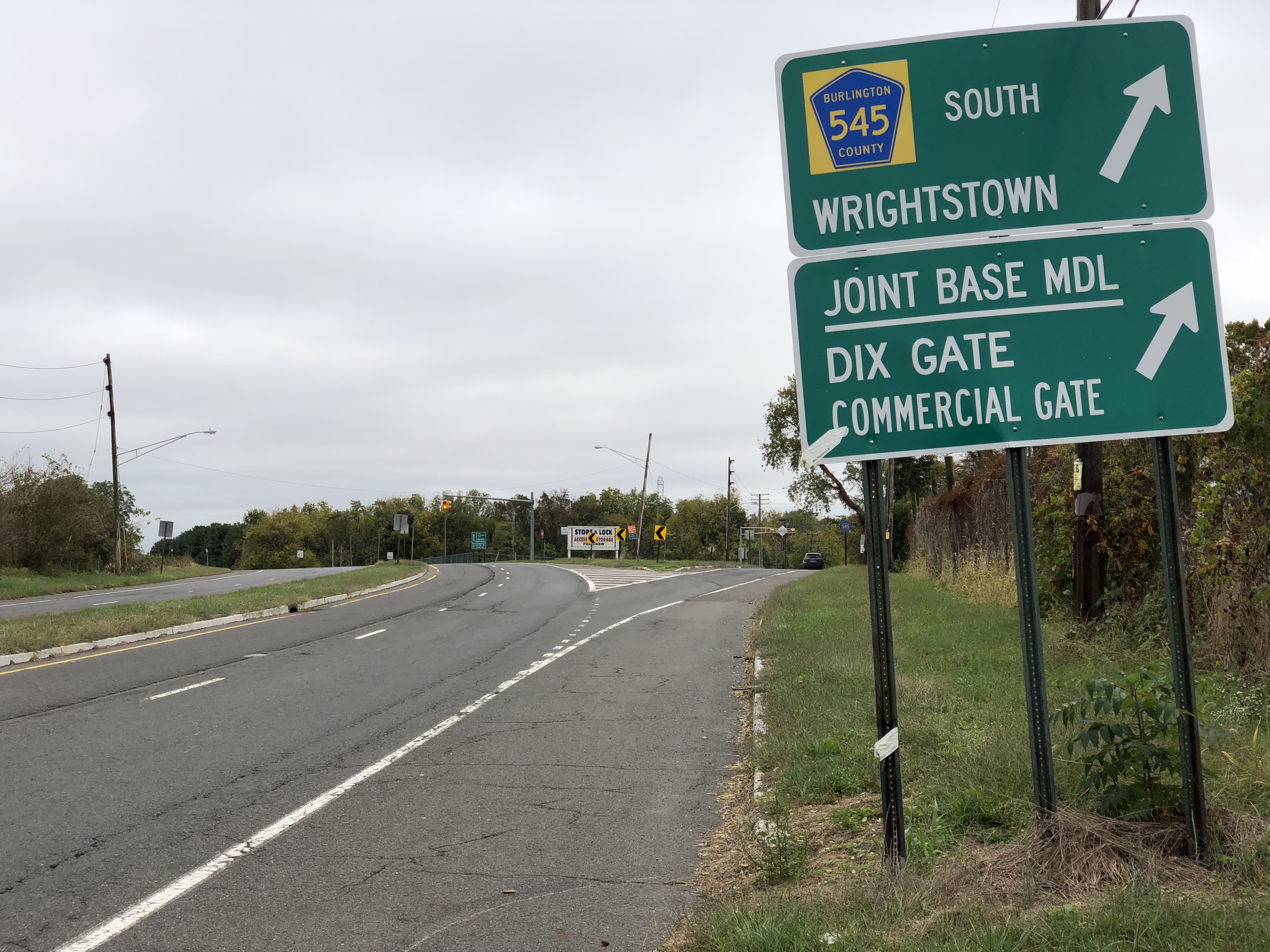
CR 545 southbound at split with CR 680 in Springfield Township, to the north of JB MDL. CR 545 provides access to Fort Dix while CR 680 provides access to McGuire AFB.

CR 545 begins at an intersection with CR 530 in the community of Browns Mills in Pemberton Township, heading north-northwest on two-lane undivided Trenton Road. The road passes a mix of homes and businesses, crossing CR 667. The route runs to the west of Deborah Heart and Lung Center before entering wooded areas with residences located along the east side of the road as it enters the grounds of the Fort Dix entity of Joint Base McGuire–Dix–Lakehurst (JB MDL) within New Hanover Township and becomes Texas Avenue. After the Range Road intersection, CR 545 reaches the Browns Mills Gate into ASA Fort Dix, at which point the general public is prohibited from the road. Along this stretch, the road runs between Fort Dix buildings to the west and McGuire Air Force Base to the east. After a traffic light with an unnamed road, the route becomes Wrightstown Road and intersects CR 616 at a traffic circle, making a turn to the north. Crossing into Wrightstown, CR 545 leaves Dix at the Wrightstown Gate, where the road is accessible to the general public again. The road passes several businesses as Fort Dix Street, crossing CR 616. In North Hanover Township, the route intersects CR 666 and bears northwest onto Wrightstown-Georgetown Road, heading into a mix of farms and homes in Springfield Township. CR 545 reaches a junction with CR 680, at which point the route merges onto a four-lane divided highway that serves as the main access road to McGuire Air Force Base via CR 680. The road crosses CR 537 and narrows back into a two-lane undivided road that turns more to the northwest as it enters Chesterfield Township. The route continues through more areas of farms, woods, and residences as it enters Mansfield Township. Here, CR 545 intersects Bordentown Road, which provides access to Route 68 a short distance to the west, and it makes a turn to the north into more residential areas. A short distance later, the route meets the northern terminus of CR 543 and becomes Bordentown-Georgetown Road. Entering Chesterfield Township again, the road enters more agricultural areas with a few patches of woods, heading north-northwest. Upon crossing CR 660, CR 545 comes into Bordentown Township and enters more residential surroundings, making a turn to the northwest as it passes under the New Jersey Turnpike (I-95). The road has intersections with US 206 and US 130 a short distance apart, with the name becoming Farnsworth Avenue at the intersection with the former and county maintenance ending at the latter. The road continues into Bordentown, where it is municipally maintained and lined with several homes and downtown businesses. In the center of Bordentown, CR 545 has an intersection with the western terminus of CR 528. After crossing over Conrail Shared Assets Operations' Robbinsville Industrial Track railroad line, the route reaches its northern terminus at the CR 662 (Park Street) intersection.

== Major intersections ==
The entire route is in Burlington County.

Location	mi	km	Destinations	Notes
Pemberton Township	0.00	0.00	CR 530 (Lakehurst Road / Pemberton–Browns Mills Road)	Southern terminus
New Hanover Township	2.37– 4.83	3.81– 7.77	Fort Dix entity of Joint Base McGuire–Dix–Lakehurst; Road closed to general public since September 11, 2001	
Springfield Township	6.59	10.61	CR 680 south (Defense Access Road) – Cookstown, Deborah Hospital, Joint Base MDL McGuire Gate	Northern terminus of CR 680
Springfield Township	6.94	11.17	CR 537 (Monmouth Road) – Mt. Holly, Freehold	
Mansfield Township	8.47	13.63	To Route 68 / I-95 / N.J. Turnpike / US 206 – Fort Dix, Bordentown, Trenton	
Mansfield Township	8.77	14.11	CR 543 south (School House Road)	Northern terminus of CR 543
Bordentown Township	13.78	22.18	US 206 – Trenton, Columbus	
Bordentown Township	14.05	22.61	US 130 – New Brunswick, Camden	
Bordentown	14.57	23.45	CR 528 east (Crosswicks Street)	Western terminus of CR 528
Bordentown	14.76	23.75	CR 662 (Park Street) / Farnsworth Avenue	Northern terminus
1.000 mi = 1.609 km; 1.000 km = 0.621 mi: Closed/former
