= Old Upper Springfield Friends Burying Ground =

- Upper Springfield Meetinghouse
- U.S. National Register of Historic Places
- U.S. Historic district
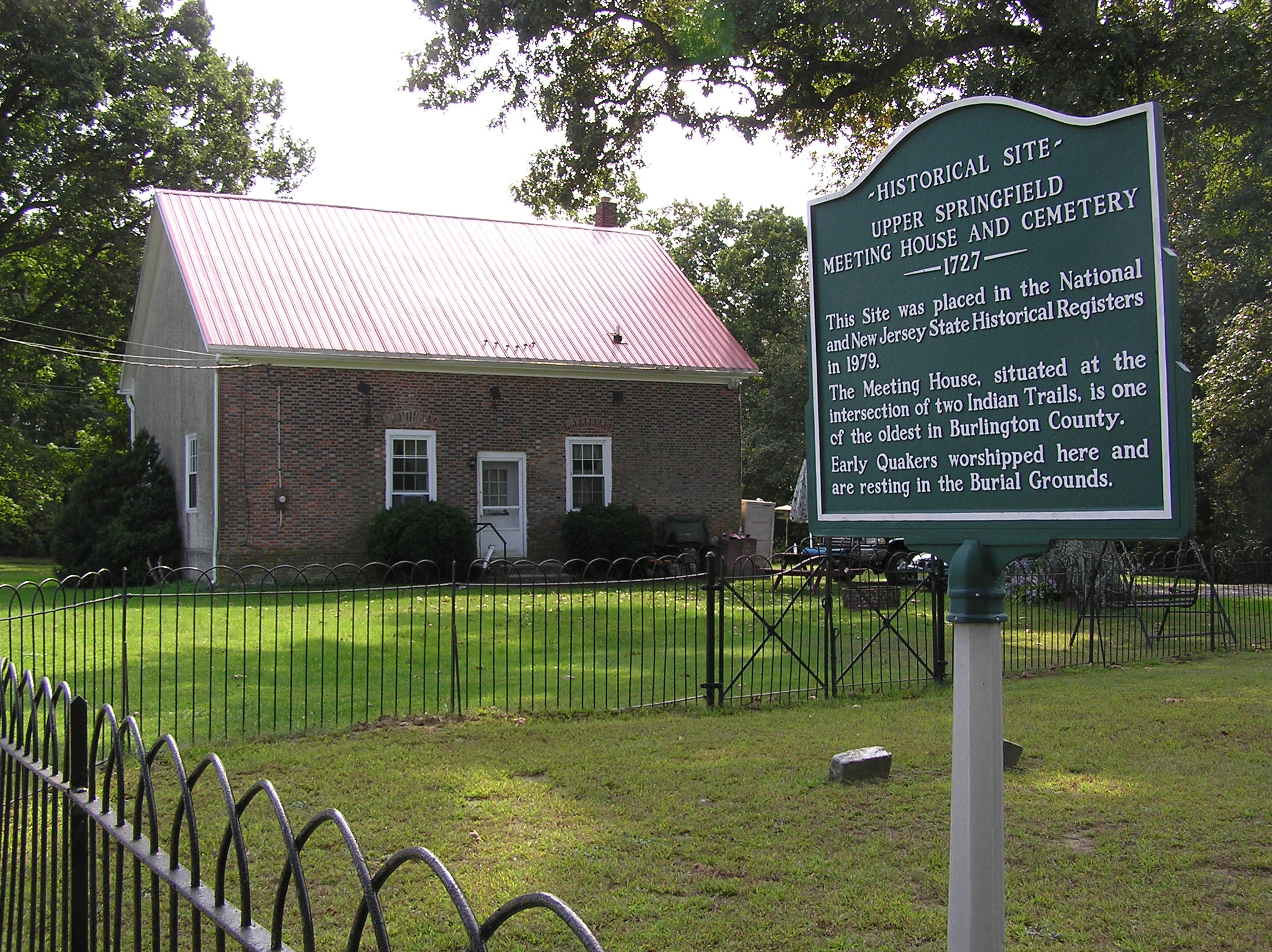

- Location within Burlington County, New Jersey Location within New Jersey Location within the United States
- Nearest city: Wrightstown, New Jersey
- Coordinates: 40°2′40″N 74°38′30″W
- Built: 1727
- NRHP reference No.: 79001479
- Added to NRHP: August 24, 1979

Old Upper Springfield Friends Burying Ground is a cemetery located in Springfield Township and Wrightstown, in Burlington County, New Jersey, United States.

The cemetery and the accompanying meeting house were placed on both the New Jersey (state ID # 875) and the National Register of Historic Places (Reference # 79001479) in 1979.

== Notable burials ==
- Thomas Newbold (1760-1823), represented New Jersey in the United States House of Representatives from 1807 to 1813.
- George Sykes (1802-1880), represented New Jersey's 2nd congressional district in the United States House of Representatives from 1843 to 1845, and was reelected in 1845 to fill a vacancy, serving until 1847.

== See also ==
- National Register of Historic Places listings in Burlington County, New Jersey
