= Thomas Newbold (New Jersey politician) =

American politician

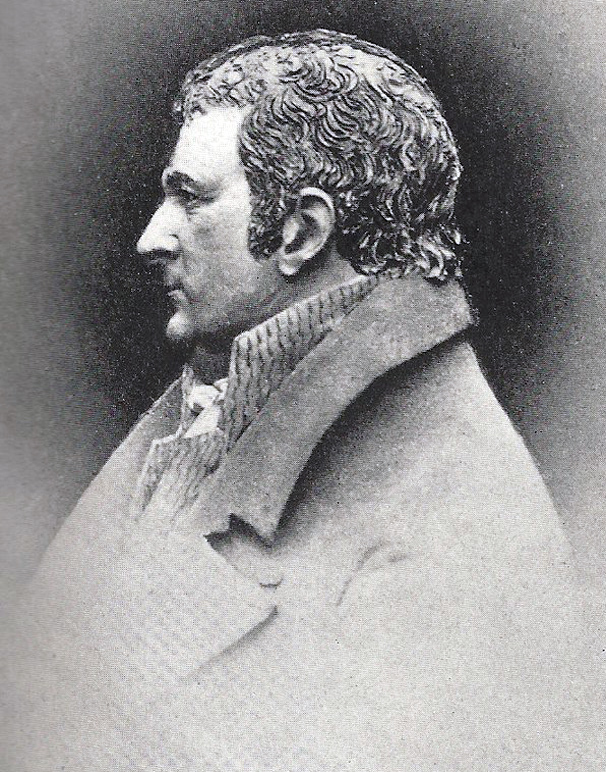

Thomas Newbold (August 2, 1760 – December 18, 1823) was a U.S. Democratic-Republican politician.

He was born in Springfield Township, Burlington County, New Jersey. He engaged in agricultural pursuits. He was a member of the New Jersey General Assembly in 1797. He then became involved in banking. He was elected as a Democratic-Republican to the United States House of Representatives from New Jersey and served from March 4, 1807, to March 3, 1813, but was not re-elected to the United States House of Representatives in 1812. He again was a member of the New Jersey General Assembly from 1820 to 1822. He died in Springfield Township, Burlington County, New Jersey. He was interred in the Old Upper Springfield Friends Burying Ground.

== Sources ==
- United States Congress. "Thomas Newbold (id: N000064)". Biographical Directory of the United States Congress.
- Thomas Newbold at The Political Graveyard

U.S. House of Representatives
Preceded by Ebenezer Elmer	Member of the U.S. House of Representatives from New Jersey's at-large congressional district 1807–1813	Succeeded by Ephraim Bateman
