= New Hanover Township, New Jersey =

Township in Burlington County, New Jersey, US

- Township
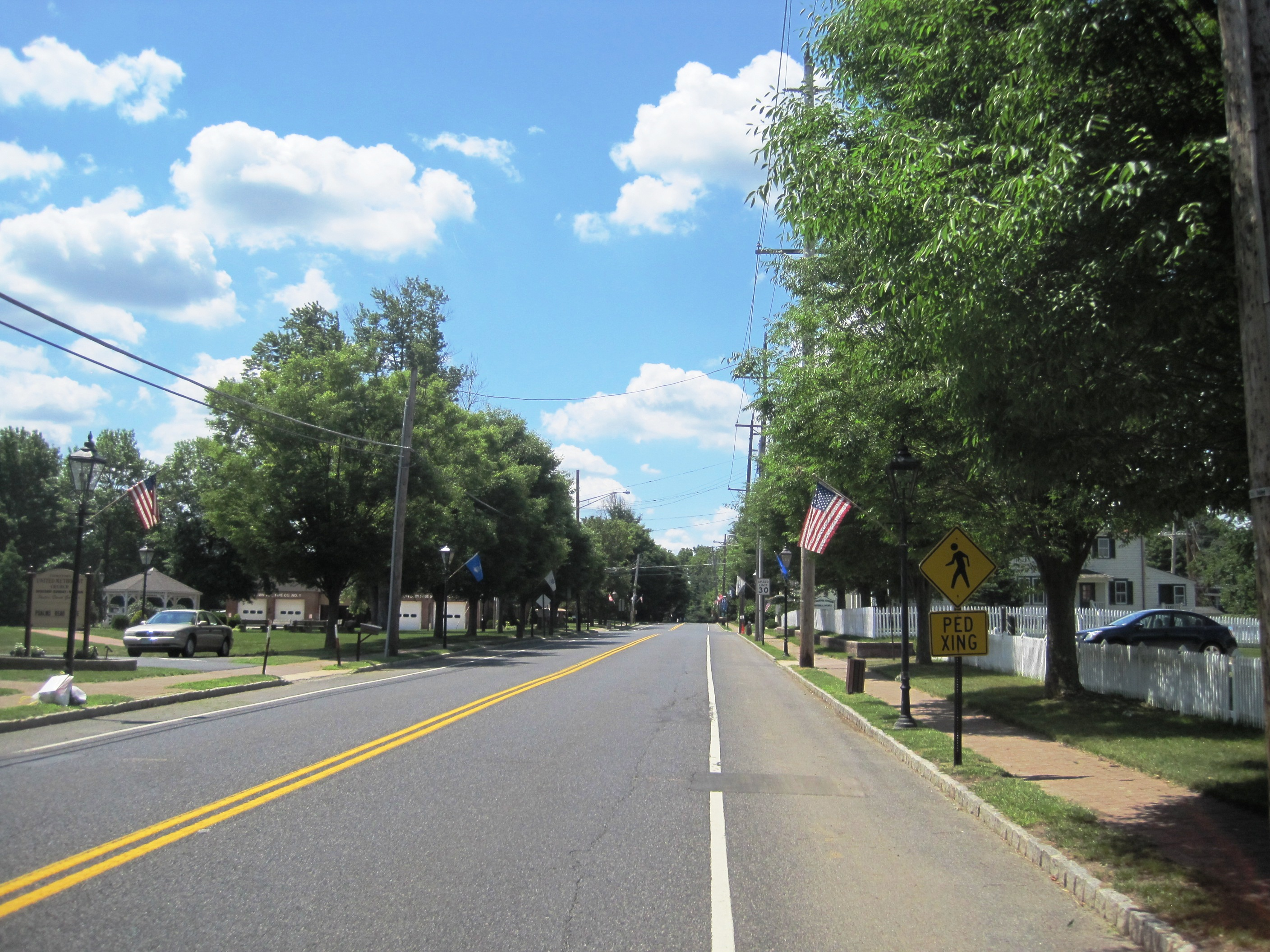
- Cookstown, an unincorporated community within New Hanover Township

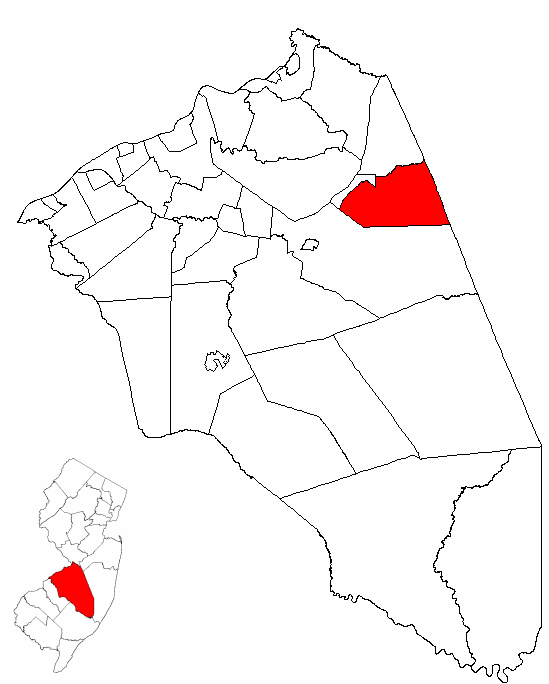
- New Hanover Township highlighted in Burlington County. Inset map: Burlington County highlighted in the State of New Jersey.

- Location in Burlington County Location in New Jersey Location in the United States
- Coordinates: 40.013969°N 74.575016°W
- Country: United States
- State: New Jersey
- County: Burlington
- Royal charter: December 2, 1723
- Incorporated: February 21, 1798

Government
  - Type: Township
  - Body: Township Committee
  - Mayor: Paul D. Peterla (R, term ends December 31, 2023)
  - Administrator / Municipal clerk: Susan D. Jackson

Area
  - Total: 22.56 sq mi (58.42 km^{2})
  - Land: 22.33 sq mi (57.84 km^{2})
  - Water: 0.22 sq mi (0.58 km^{2}) 0.99%
  - Rank: 122nd of 565 in state 11th of 40 in county
- Elevation: 105 ft (32 m)

Population (2020)
  - Total: 6,367
  - Estimate (2023): 6,348
  - Rank: 333rd of 565 in state 26th of 40 in county
  - Density: 285.1/sq mi (110.1/km^{2})
  - Rank: 480th of 565 in state 33rd of 40 in county
- Time zone: UTC−05:00 (Eastern (EST))
  - Summer (DST): UTC−04:00 (Eastern (EDT))
- ZIP Code: 08511 – Cookstown
- Area code: 609
- FIPS code: 3400551510
- GNIS feature ID: 0882088
- Website: www.newhanovertwp.com

New Hanover Township is a township in Burlington County, in the U.S. state of New Jersey. As of the 2020 United States census, the township's population was 6,367, a decrease of 1,018 (−13.8%) from the 2010 census count of 7,385, which in turn reflected decline of 2,359 (−24.2%) from the 9,744 counted in the 2000 census. The township, and all of Burlington County, is a part of the Philadelphia metropolitan area.

== History ==
New Hanover was originally formed by Royal charter on December 2, 1723, from portions of Chesterfield Township and Springfield Township. New Hanover was incorporated as one of New Jersey's initial 104 townships by an act of the New Jersey Legislature on February 21, 1798. Portions of the township were taken to form Pemberton borough (December 15, 1826), Pemberton Township (March 10, 1846), North Hanover Township (April 12, 1905) and Wrightstown (March 4, 1918).

== Geography ==
According to the United States Census Bureau, the township had a total area of 22.56 square miles (58.42 km^{2}), including 22.33 square miles (57.84 km^{2}) of land and 0.22 square miles (0.58 km^{2}) of water (0.99%).

Fort Dix is an unincorporated community and census-designated place (CDP) with a total 2010 Census population of 7,716 located in portions of New Hanover Township (5,951 of the total), Pemberton Township (1,765 of CDP's residents) and Springfield Township (with no residents in the CDP). McGuire AFB CDP is a CDP with a 2010 population of 3,710 located in portions of New Hanover Township (737 of the total) and North Hanover Township (2,973). Cookstown is a CDP with a 2020 population of 900.

Other unincorporated communities, localities and place names located partially or completely within the township include Cranberry Hall, Cranbury Park, Fountain Green, Lewistown, Mahalala, Pointville, Shreve and Taylors Mountain.

The township borders North Hanover Township, Pemberton Township and Wrightstown in Burlington County; and Plumsted Township in Ocean County.

The township is one of 56 South Jersey municipalities that are included within the New Jersey Pinelands National Reserve, a protected natural area of unique ecology covering 1,100,000 acres (450,000 ha), that has been classified as a United States Biosphere Reserve and established by Congress in 1978 as the nation's first National Reserve. Part of the township is included in the state-designated Pinelands Area, which includes portions of Burlington County, along with areas in Atlantic, Camden, Cape May, Cumberland, Gloucester and Ocean counties.

== Demographics ==
Historical population
Census	Pop.	Note	%±
1810	2,536		—
1820	2,642		4.2%
1830	2,859	*	8.2%
1840	3,045		6.5%
1850	2,245	*	−26.3%
1860	2,526		12.5%
1870	2,536		0.4%
1880	2,373		−6.4%
1890	1,962		−17.3%
1900	1,847	*	−5.9%
1910	948		−48.7%
1920	5,606	*	491.4%
1930	646		−88.5%
1940	983		52.2%
1950	18,168		1,748.2%
1960	28,528		57.0%
1970	27,410		−3.9%
1980	14,258		−48.0%
1990	9,546		−33.0%
2000	9,744		2.1%
2010	7,385		−24.2%
2020	6,367		−13.8%
2023 (est.)	6,348		−0.3%
Population sources: 1800–2000; 1800–1920 1840; 1850–1870 1850 1870; 1880–1890 1890–1910 1910–1930; 1940–2000 2000; 2010 2020 * = Lost territory in previous decade. 1920 data includes 5,018 in Camp Dix.

=== 2010 census ===
The 2010 United States census counted 7,385 people, 551 households, and 441 families in the township. The population density was 333.0 per square mile (128.6/km^{2}). There were 613 housing units at an average density of 27.6 per square mile (10.7/km^{2}). The racial makeup was 54.06% (3,992) White, 33.57% (2,479) Black or African American, 0.65% (48) Native American, 2.04% (151) Asian, 0.08% (6) Pacific Islander, 6.24% (461) from other races, and 3.36% (248) from two or more races. Hispanic or Latino of any race were 20.96% (1,548) of the population.

Of the 551 households, 50.8% had children under the age of 18; 67.2% were married couples living together; 9.3% had a female householder with no husband present and 20.0% were non-families. Of all households, 16.7% were made up of individuals and 2.4% had someone living alone who was 65 years of age or older. The average household size was 3.09 and the average family size was 3.50.

7.9% of the population were under the age of 18, 7.4% from 18 to 24, 46.7% from 25 to 44, 34.2% from 45 to 64, and 3.7% who were 65 years of age or older. The median age was 41.1 years. For every 100 females, the population had 624.0 males. For every 100 females ages 18 and older there were 830.1 males.

The Census Bureau's 2006–2010 American Community Survey showed that (in 2010 inflation-adjusted dollars) median household income was $63,796 (with a margin of error of +/− $9,062) and the median family income was $61,083 (+/− $9,842). Males had a median income of $33,368 (+/− $5,196) versus $38,977 (+/− $6,300) for females. The per capita income for the borough was $15,387 (+/− $1,620). About 0.7% of families and 0.7% of the population were below the poverty line, including 0.8% of those under age 18 and 8.5% of those age 65 or over.

=== 2000 census ===
As of the 2000 United States census there were 9,744 people, 1,162 households, and 991 families residing in the township. The population density was 437.3 inhabitants per square mile (168.8/km^{2}). There were 1,381 housing units at an average density of 62.0 per square mile (23.9/km^{2}). The racial makeup of the township was 64.1% White, 28.9% African American, 0.4% Native American, 1.5% Asian, 0.1% Pacific Islander, 2.7% from other races, and 2.3% from two or more races. Hispanic or Latino of any race were 19.4% of the population.

There were 1,162 households, out of which 60.9% had children under the age of 18 living with them, 78.1% were married couples living together, 3.7% had a female householder with no husband present, and 14.7% were non-families. 13.7% of all households were made up of individuals, and 0.9% had someone living alone who was 65 years of age or older. The average household size was 3.14 and the average family size was 3.46.

In the township the population was spread out, with 14.5% under the age of 18, 15.7% from 18 to 24, 55.4% from 25 to 44, 13.2% from 45 to 64, and 1.3% who were 65 years of age or older. The median age was 32 years. For every 100 females, there were 401.8 males. For every 100 females age 18 and over, there were 561.7 males.

The median income for a household in the township was $44,386, and the median income for a family was $45,511. Males had a median income of $26,428 versus $23,050 for females. The per capita income for the township was $12,140. About 3.2% of families and 3.9% of the population were below the poverty line, including 3.3% of those under age 18 and 12.8% of those age 65 or over.

== Government ==
=== Local government ===
New Hanover Township is governed under the Township form of New Jersey municipal government, one of 141 municipalities (of the 564) statewide that use this form, the second-most commonly used form of government in the state. The Township Committee is comprised of five members, who are elected directly by the voters at-large in partisan elections to serve three-year terms of office on a staggered basis, with either one or two seats coming up for election each year as part of the November general election in a three-year cycle. At an annual reorganization meeting held in January after each election, the Township Committee selects one of its members to serve as Mayor and another as Deputy Mayor.

As of 2023, the members of the New Hanover Township Committee are Mayor Paul D. Peterla (R, term on committee and as mayor ends December 30, 2023), Deputy Mayor Rick Koshak (R, term on committee ends 2024; term as deputy mayor ends 2023), Patrick Murphy (R, 2024), Nicholas Pawlyzyn Sr. (R, 2023) and Aaron Smith (R, 2025).

=== Federal, state and county representation ===
New Hanover Township is located in the 3rd Congressional District and is part of New Jersey's 8th state legislative district.

For the 119th United States Congress, New Jersey's 3rd congressional district is currently represented Herb Conaway (D, Delran Township). New Jersey is represented in the United States Senate by Democrats Cory Booker (Newark, term ends 2027) and Andy Kim (Moorestown, term ends 2031).

For the 2026–2027 session, the 8th legislative district of the New Jersey Legislature is represented in the New Jersey Senate by Latham Tiver (R, Southampton Township) and in the General Assembly by Anthony Angelozzi (D, Hammonton) and Andrea Katz (D, Chesterfield Township).

Burlington County is governed by a Board of County Commissioners comprised of five members who are chosen at-large in partisan elections to serve three-year terms of office on a staggered basis, with either one or two seats coming up for election each year; at an annual reorganization meeting, the board selects a director and deputy director from among its members to serve a one-year term. As of 2026, Burlington County's Commissioners are: Director Felicia Hopson (D, Willingboro Township, term as commissioner ends December 31, 2027; term as director ends 2026), Deputy Director Allison Eckel (D, Medford, term as commissioner ends 2028; term as deputy director ends 2026), Randy Brolo (D, Lumberton, 2026; elected to an unexpired term), Tyler Burrell (D, Delran Township, 2027) and Tom Pullion (D, Edgewater Park, 2026).

Burlington County's constitutional officers are Clerk Joanne Schwartz (D, Southampton Township, 2028), Sheriff James H. Kostoplis (D, Bordentown, 2028) and Surrogate Brian J. Carlin (D, Burlington Township, 2026).

=== Politics ===
United States presidential election results for New Hanover Township 2024 2020 2016 2012 2008 2004
Year	Republican		Democratic		Third party(ies)	
Year	No.	%	No.	%	No.	%
2024	357	63.52%	199	35.41%	6	1.07%
2020	371	59.46%	244	39.10%	9	1.44%
2016	283	60.60%	171	36.62%	13	2.78%
2012	246	55.16%	194	43.50%	6	1.35%
2008	264	57.77%	190	41.58%	3	0.66%
2004	256	65.47%	131	33.50%	4	1.02%

As of March 2011, there were a total of 689 registered voters in New Hanover Township, of which 148 (21.5% vs. 33.3% countywide) were registered as Democrats, 278 (40.3% vs. 23.9%) were registered as Republicans and 262 (38.0% vs. 42.8%) were registered as Unaffiliated. There was one voter registered to another party. Among the township's 2010 Census population, 9.3% (vs. 61.7% in Burlington County) were registered to vote, including 10.1% of those ages 18 and over (vs. 80.3% countywide).

In the 2012 presidential election, Republican Mitt Romney received 246 votes (55.2% vs. 40.2% countywide), ahead of Democrat Barack Obama with 194 votes (43.5% vs. 58.1%) and other candidates with 6 votes (1.3% vs. 1.0%), among the 446 ballots cast by the township's 742 registered voters, for a turnout of 60.1% (vs. 74.5% in Burlington County). In the 2008 presidential election, Republican John McCain received 264 votes (56.3% vs. 39.9% countywide), ahead of Democrat Barack Obama with 190 votes (40.5% vs. 58.4%) and other candidates with 3 votes (0.6% vs. 1.0%), among the 469 ballots cast by the township's 674 registered voters, for a turnout of 69.6% (vs. 80.0% in Burlington County). In the 2004 presidential election, Republican George W. Bush received 256 votes (65.3% vs. 46.0% countywide), ahead of Democrat John Kerry with 131 votes (33.4% vs. 52.9%) and other candidates with 4 votes (1.0% vs. 0.8%), among the 392 ballots cast by the township's 572 registered voters, for a turnout of 68.5% (vs. 78.8% in the whole county).

Gubernatorial election results for New Hanover Township
Year	Republican		Democratic		Third party(ies)	
Year	No.	%	No.	%	No.	%
2025	271	64.52%	144	34.29%	5	1.19%
2021	256	71.11%	101	28.06%	3	0.83%
2017	172	64.42%	84	31.46%	11	4.12%
2013	224	78.87%	57	20.07%	3	1.06%
2009	206	62.80%	97	29.57%	25	7.62%
2005	183	63.99%	92	32.17%	11	3.85%

In the 2013 gubernatorial election, Republican Chris Christie received 224 votes (76.7% vs. 61.4% countywide), ahead of Democrat Barbara Buono with 57 votes (19.5% vs. 35.8%) and other candidates with 3 votes (1.0% vs. 1.2%), among the 292 ballots cast by the township's 726 registered voters, yielding a 40.2% turnout (vs. 44.5% in the county). In the 2009 gubernatorial election, Republican Chris Christie received 206 votes (59.2% vs. 47.7% countywide), ahead of Democrat Jon Corzine with 97 votes (27.9% vs. 44.5%), Independent Chris Daggett with 15 votes (4.3% vs. 4.8%) and other candidates with 10 votes (2.9% vs. 1.2%), among the 348 ballots cast by the township's 723 registered voters, yielding a 48.1% turnout (vs. 44.9% in the county).

United States Senate election results for New Hanover Township1
Year	Republican		Democratic		Third party(ies)	
Year	No.	%	No.	%	No.	%
2024	330	61.34%	200	37.17%	8	1.49%
2018	255	62.50%	130	31.86%	23	5.64%
2012	237	57.11%	175	42.17%	3	0.72%
2006	173	63.14%	94	34.31%	7	2.55%

United States Senate election results for New Hanover Township2
Year	Republican		Democratic		Third party(ies)	
Year	No.	%	No.	%	No.	%
2020	350	58.63%	238	39.87%	9	1.51%
2014	149	66.52%	71	31.70%	4	1.79%
2013	122	69.71%	52	29.71%	1	0.57%
2008	231	57.61%	164	40.90%	6	1.50%

== Education ==
Public school students in pre-kindergarten through eighth grade attend the New Hanover Township School, which serves students from both New Hanover Township and Wrightstown as part of the New Hanover Township School District. Students of military families at Joint Base McGuire–Dix–Lakehurst located within the township have separate school zoning. Students living on the base have choices of three school districts, none of them being New Hanover schools.

As of the 2023–24 school year, the district, comprised of one school, had an enrollment of 197 students and 19.4 classroom teachers (on an FTE basis), for a student–teacher ratio of 10.2:1. In the 2016–17 school year, the district had the 40th-smallest enrollment of any school district in the state.

For ninth through twelfth grades, public school students from both New Hanover Township and Wrightstown attend Bordentown Regional High School as part of a sending/receiving relationship with the Bordentown Regional School District, a regional K-12 school district that serves students from Bordentown City, Bordentown Township and Fieldsboro Borough. As of the 2023–24 school year, the high school had an enrollment of 762 students and 55.5 classroom teachers (on an FTE basis), for a student–teacher ratio of 13.7:1.

Students from New Hanover Township, and from all of Burlington County, are eligible to attend the Burlington County Institute of Technology, a countywide public school district that serves the vocational and technical education needs of students at the high school and post-secondary level at its campuses in Medford and Westampton.

== Transportation ==
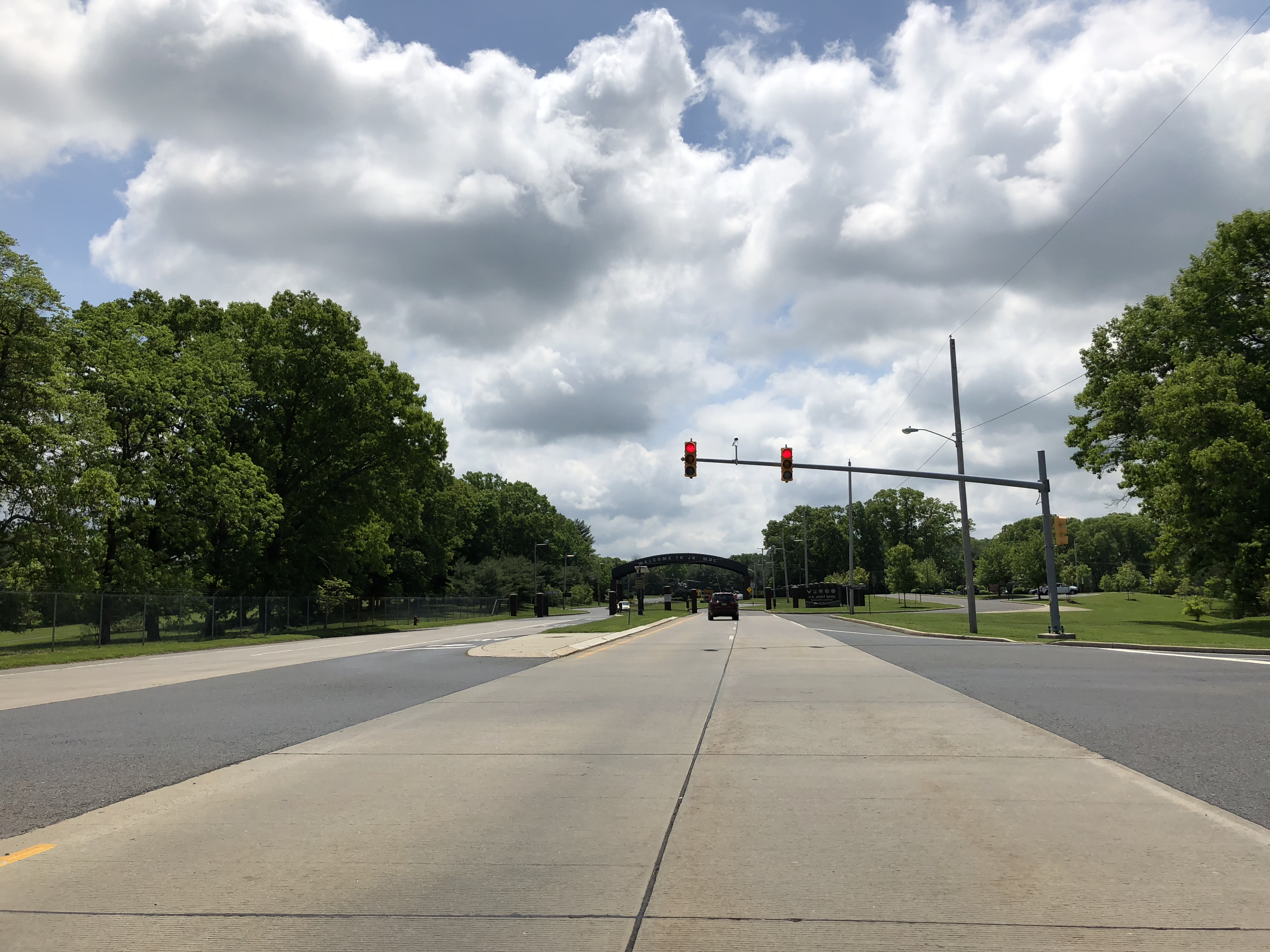
Route 68 in New Hanover Township at the entrance to the Fort Dix entity of Joint Base McGuire–Dix–Lakehurst

=== Roads and highways ===
As of May 2010, the township had a total of 24.13 miles (38.83 km) of roadways, of which 13.11 miles (21.10 km) were maintained by the municipality, 10.70 miles (17.22 km) by Burlington County and 0.32 miles (0.51 km) by the New Jersey Department of Transportation.

New Jersey Route 68 reaches its southern terminus in New Hanover Township. County Route 545 has a gap in New Hanover due to the restricted area on the Fort Dix entity of Joint Base McGuire-Dix-Lakehurst.

=== Public transportation ===
NJ Transit provides bus service in the township on the 317 route between Asbury Park and Philadelphia.

== Notable people ==
People who were born in, residents of, or otherwise closely associated with New Hanover Township include:

- Edward Settle Godfrey (1843–1932), United States Army Brigadier General who received the Medal of Honor for leadership as a captain during the Indian Wars
