= Daniel V. Asay =

American iceboat racer (1847–1930)

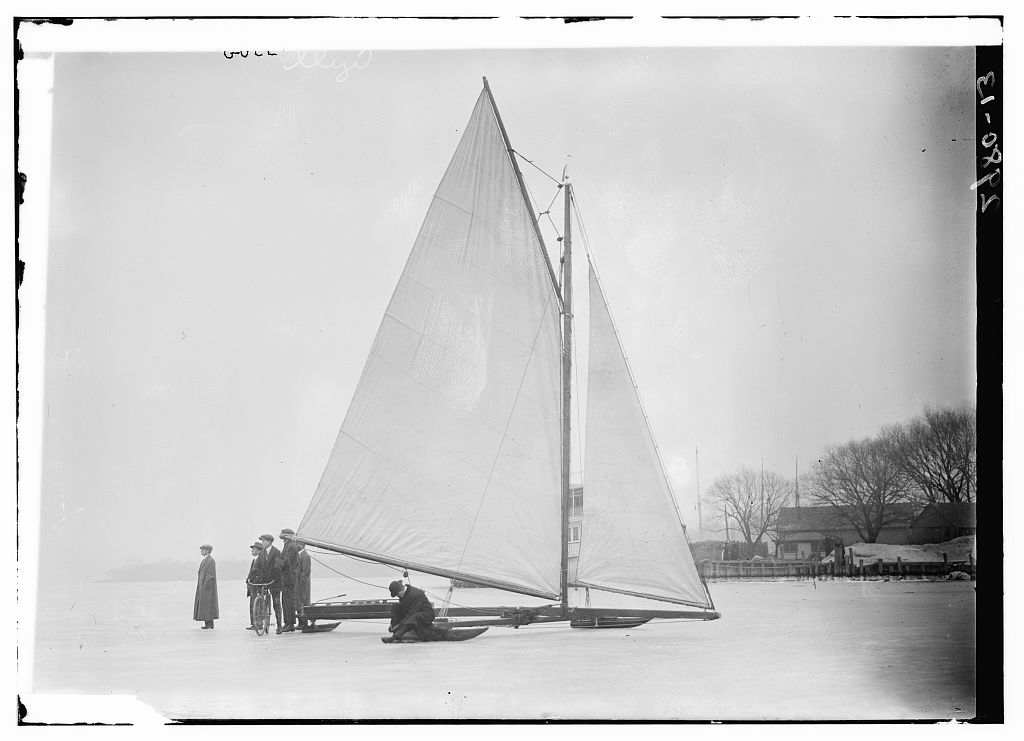
Daniel V. Asay's iceboat Gull

Daniel V. Asay (June 26, 1847 – May 2, 1930) was an American iceboat racer. He claimed to be the oldest ice yacht sailor in the world. His ice boat Gull competed in more races than any other in its class.

== Biography ==
He was born on June 26, 1847, in Wrightstown, New Jersey. He married Sarah E. Bowman (1843–1896) and after her death married Mary Long (1865–1926). He designed, and sailed his iceboats along the frozen Shrewsbury River.

He died on May 2, 1930, in Red Bank, New Jersey.
