= County Route 543 (New Jersey) =

County highway in New Jersey, U.S.

County Route 543
- CR 543 highlighted in red, signed spur route in blue

Route information
- Length: 28.77 mi (46.30 km)

Major junctions
- South end: CR 537 in Camden
- Route 73 in Palmyra; US 130 in Burlington Township; Route 413 in Burlington; CR 541 in Burlington; US 206 in Mansfield Township; Route 68 in Mansfield Township
- North end: CR 545 in Mansfield Township

Location
- Country: United States
- State: New Jersey
- Counties: Camden, Burlington

Highway system
- County routes in New Jersey; 500-series routes
← CR 542	→ CR 544

County Route 543 (CR 543) is a county highway in the U.S. state of New Jersey. The highway extends 28.77 miles (46.30 km) from Federal Street (CR 537) in Camden to Wrightstown–Georgetown Road (CR 545) in Mansfield Township.

== Route description ==
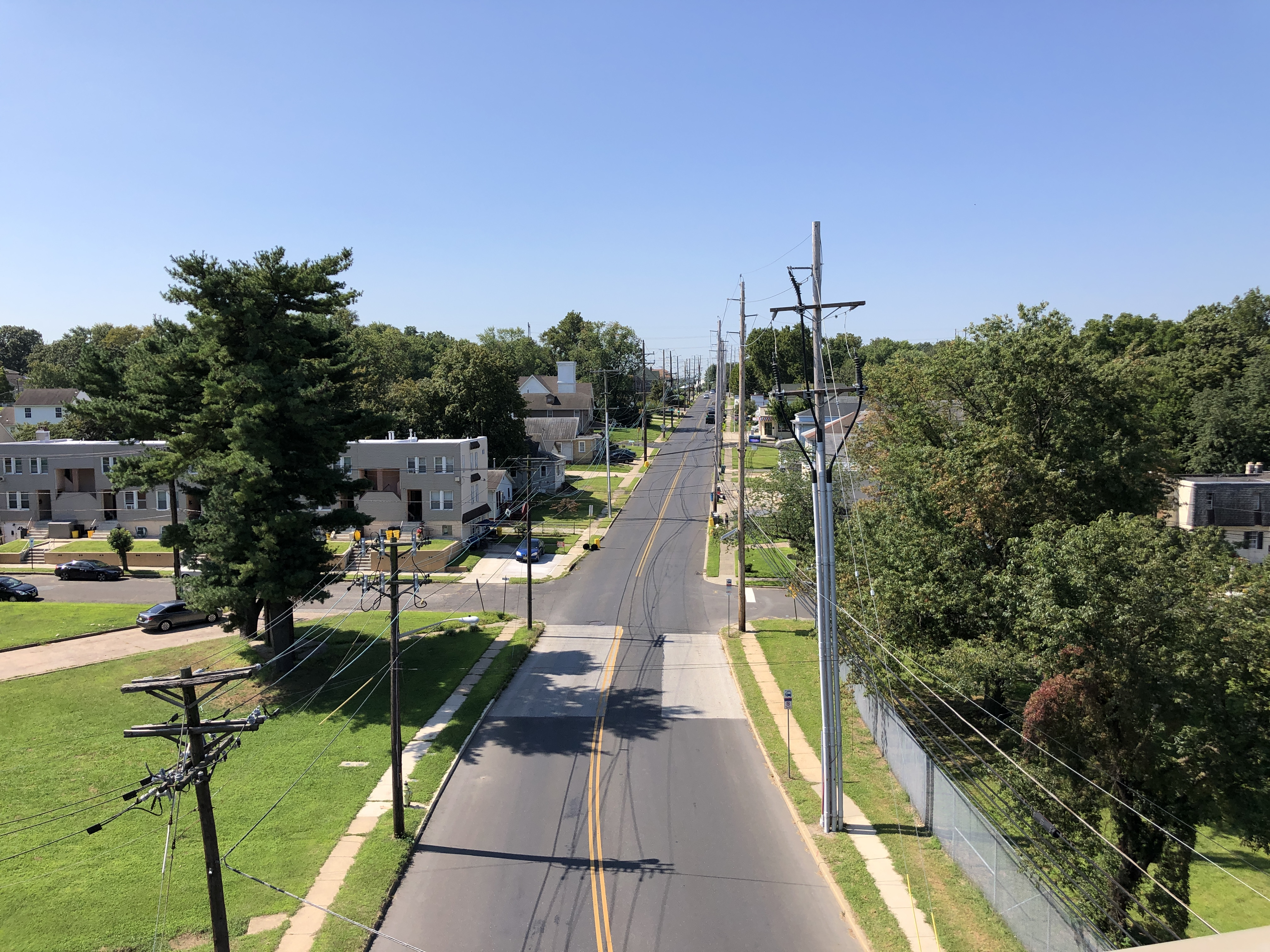
View southbound along CR 543 from Route 90 in Pennsauken

CR 543 begins at an intersection with CR 537 in Camden, Camden County, heading northeast on two-lane undivided River Road through urban industrial areas. The road crosses a set of railroad tracks used by NJ Transit's River Line and Conrail Shared Assets Operations. The route crosses CR 601 and heads into urban residential areas with a few businesses, where it encounters CR 609. Upon crossing CR 611, CR 543 enters Pennsauken Township and turns east through industry, passing over the River Line near the 36th Street station. From here, the road turns northeast again and passes through suburban areas of homes, intersecting CR 612 Spur and CR 612. After the CR 616 junction, the route heads into industrial areas and intersects CR 760 before passing under NJ Transit's Atlantic City Line. CR 543 crosses CR 614 and passes homes as it crosses under the Betsy Ross Bridge, which carries Route 90, and comes to the CR 615 junction. After crossing a railroad line, the route runs past more industrial establishments, passing the entrance to the Pennsauken – Route 73 River Line station.

Upon crossing the Pennsauken Creek, CR 543 enters Palmyra in Burlington County and immediately comes to an interchange with Route 73. The route intersects CR 601 and turns northwest onto Public Road, passing residential and industrial areas. CR 543 crosses the River Line and immediately turns northeast onto Broad Street. Broad Street continues southwest from here towards Route 73 and is signed as a portion of CR 543. The mainline of CR 543 passes homes, running immediately north of the railroad tracks. The road enters the commercial downtown of Palmyra and crosses CR 607 near the Palmyra Station of the River Line before reaching the CR 602 junction. The route gains a center left-turn lane and enters residential areas again and crosses into Riverton at the Elm Avenue intersection, coming to the CR 603 junction near the Riverton Station. After crossing the Pomeston Creek, CR 543 enters Cinnaminson Township and becomes Saint Mihiel Drive, running through residential and industrial areas, passing the Cinnaminson Station. The road passes more industry as a four-lane undivided road, continuing into Delran Township, where it passes a marina to the north. The route passes some homes and businesses before entering Riverside Township at the CR 604 intersection. In Riverside Township, the route passes more commercial developments, becoming Lafayette Avenue at the Fairview Street intersection, which narrows to two lanes. CR 543 turns north onto Pavilion Avenue near the Riverside Station and passes through residential and commercial areas.

The route crosses the Rancocas Creek on the Riverside–Delanco Bridge, a truss bridge with a swing span, and continues into Delanco Township, where it is known as Burlington Avenue. CR 543 passes homes and turns to the northeast again, continuing through a mix of homes and businesses. The route intersects CR 624 and passes more development, crossing a railroad line. The road heads into Beverly and becomes Warren Street, passing through residential areas before coming to the commercial downtown and intersecting CR 626 and CR 630. Here, CR 543 turns east and passes more residences before leaving Beverly for Edgewater Park Township. The road runs through more wooded areas of homes prior to crossing under the River Line. Upon entering, Burlington Township, the route becomes Beverly Road and passes residential and commercial development before intersecting US 130.

The route forms a concurrency with US 130 on a six-lane divided highway and heads northeast into Burlington. A bypass takes US 130 and CR 543 around the downtown area of Burlington. The road comes to an intersection with the eastern terminus of Route 413, which provides access to the Burlington–Bristol Bridge. Past this intersection, US 130/CR 543 turns east, with the median widening to include businesses. Along this portion of road, there is an intersection with the northern terminus of CR 541. The road narrows to four lanes as it crosses Assicunk Creek, where the median also narrows. The road turns northeast into a residential area, and CR 543 splits from US 130 by heading to the east on two-lane undivided Columbus Road.

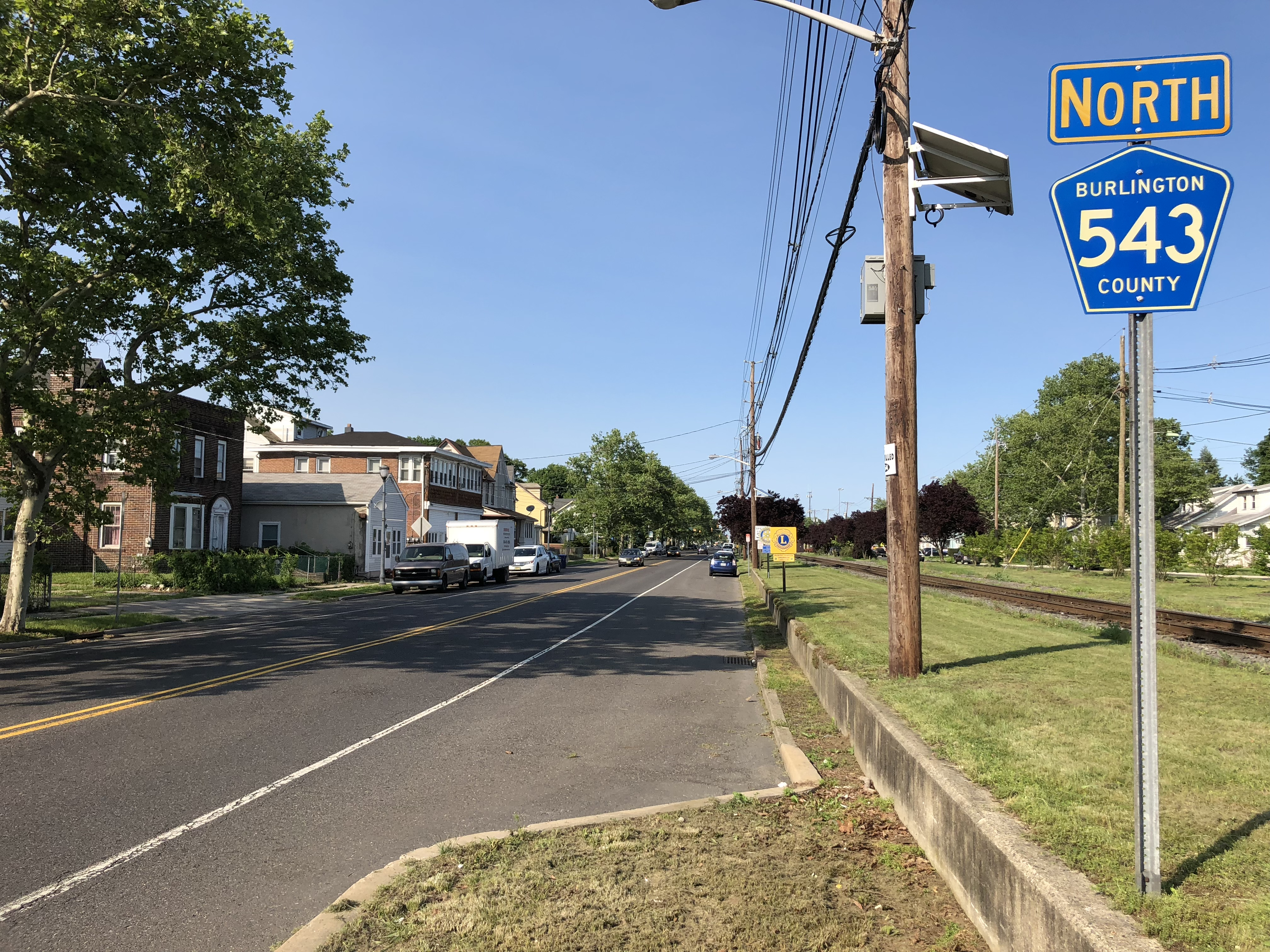
View north along CR 543 at Market Street in Palmyra

The route heads through residential neighborhoods and crosses back into Burlington Township. The road continues into Florence Township and enters a mix of farms, woods, and development, intersecting CR 660 and CR 693. CR 543 crosses over I-295 and enters Mansfield Township, where the route turns southeast at a junction with CR 656, a road that interchanges with I-295 a short distance to the northwest. CR 543 soon passes over the New Jersey Turnpike before crossing CR 628 and passing some housing developments and farm fields. The road comes to a partial interchange with US 206 and soon intersects CR 690 in the residential community of Columbus, which it passes through as Main Street. After Columbus, the road becomes Mount Pleasant Road and enters agricultural areas with some homes. CR 543 turns north onto Gaunt's Bridge Road and enters wooded areas with homes, turning northeast onto School House Road. The route crosses Route 68 before coming to its terminus at CR 545 a short distance later.

== History ==
The road from Burlington to Beverly was once maintained by the Burlington and Beverly Turnpike, chartered in 1858.

== Major intersections ==
County	Location	mi	km	Destinations	Notes
Camden	Camden	0.00	0.00	CR 537 (Federal Street)	Southern terminus
Burlington	Palmyra	5.41	8.71	Route 73 – Tacony–Palmyra Bridge, Philadelphia, Marlton, Shore Points	Interchange
Burlington	Burlington Township	16.03	25.80	US 130 south – Camden	South end of US 130 overlap
Burlington	Burlington	16.51	26.57	Route 413 west (Keim Boulevard) to PA 413 – Bristol Bridge	
Burlington	Burlington	17.01	27.37	CR 541 south (High Street) to N.J. Turnpike – Mount Holly	
Burlington	Burlington	17.95	28.89	US 130 north – Trenton	North end of US 130 overlap
Burlington	Mansfield Township	24.48	39.40	US 206 – Bordentown, Truck Stops, Hammonton	Interchange
Burlington	Mansfield Township	28.44	45.77	Route 68 – Bordentown, Fort Dix	
Burlington	Mansfield Township	28.77	46.30	CR 545 (Chest–Georgetown Road)	Northern terminus
1.000 mi = 1.609 km; 1.000 km = 0.621 mi: Concurrency terminus
