= Springfield Township, Burlington County, New Jersey =

Township in Burlington County, New Jersey, US

Springfield Township, New Jersey
- Township
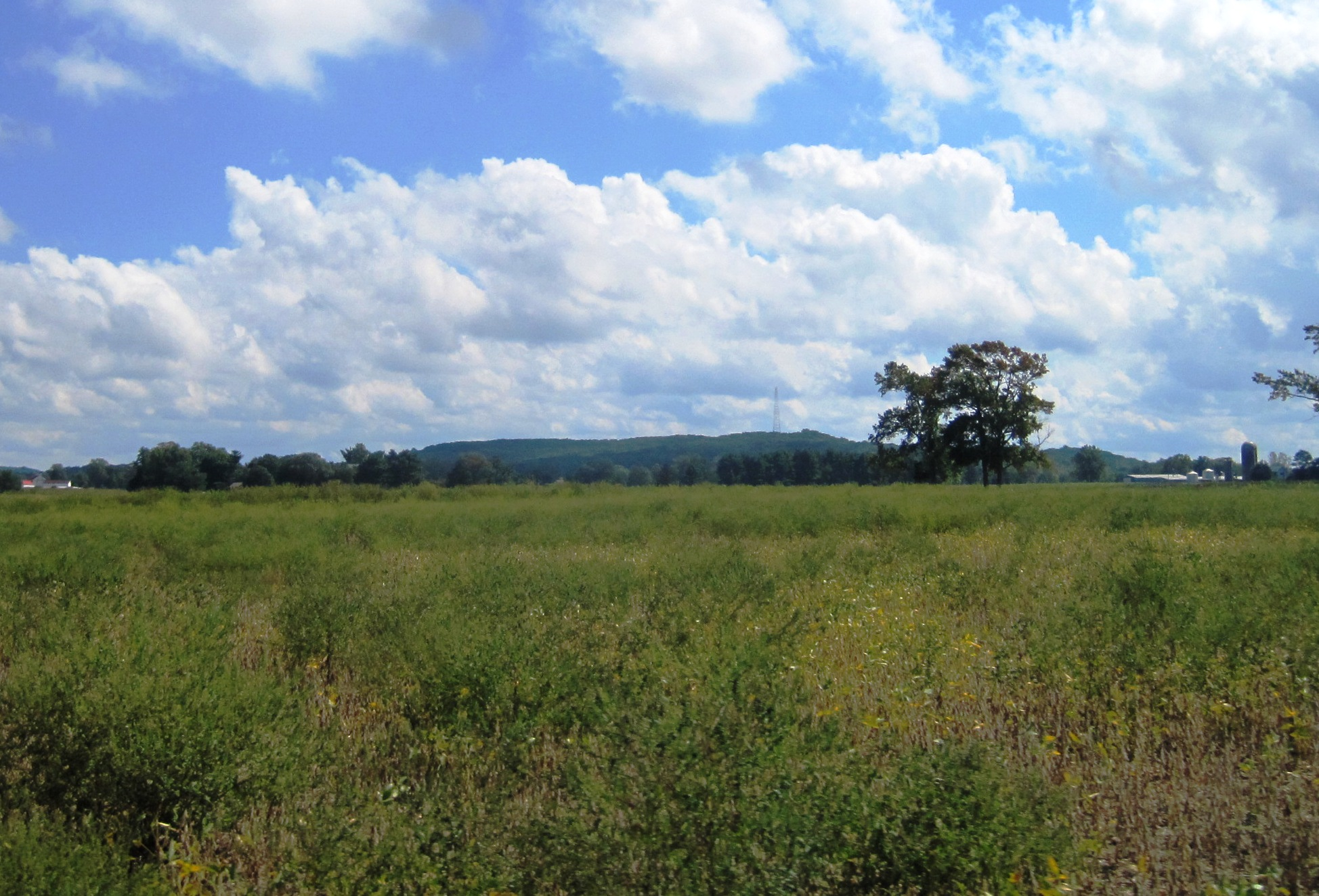
- Arneys Mount, the highest point in Burlington County, in Springfield Township

- Seal

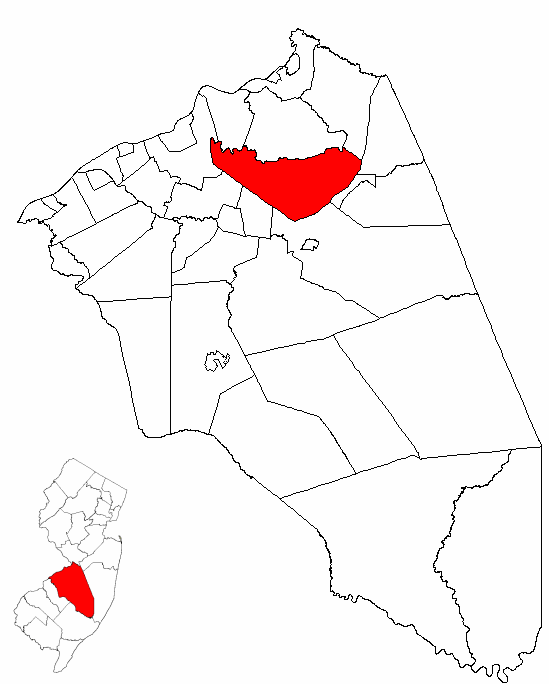
- Location of Springfield Township in Burlington County highlighted in red (right). Inset map: Location of Burlington County in New Jersey highlighted in red (left).

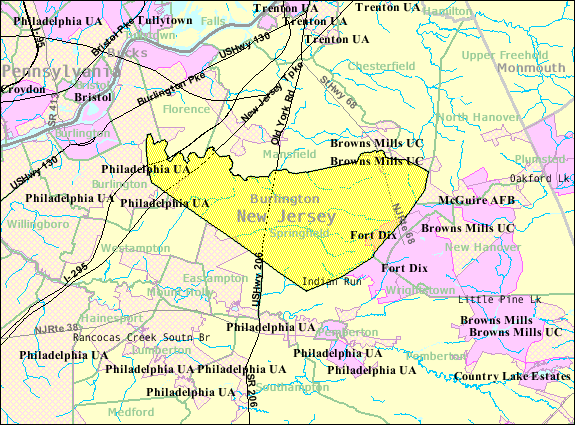
- Census Bureau map of Springfield Township, Burlington County, New Jersey

- Location in Burlington County Location in New Jersey Location in the United States
- Coordinates: 40.041216°N 74.710125°W
- Country: United States
- State: New Jersey
- County: Burlington
- Formed: November 6, 1688
- Royal charter: January 13, 1713
- Incorporated: February 21, 1798

Government
  - Type: Faulkner Act (council–manager)
  - Body: Township Council
  - Mayor: David Frank (R, term ends December 31, 2023)
  - Manager: Brandy C. Boyington
  - Municipal clerk: Brandy C. Boyington

Area
  - Total: 29.57 sq mi (76.58 km^{2})
  - Land: 29.51 sq mi (76.44 km^{2})
  - Water: 0.058 sq mi (0.15 km^{2}) 0.19%
  - Rank: 92nd of 565 in state 10th of 40 in county
- Elevation: 69 ft (21 m)

Population (2020)
  - Total: 3,245
  - Estimate (2023): 3,251
  - Rank: 438th of 565 in state 32nd of 40 in county
  - Density: 110/sq mi (42/km^{2})
  - Rank: 534th of 565 in state 37th of 40 in county
- Time zone: UTC−05:00 (Eastern (EST))
  - Summer (DST): UTC−04:00 (Eastern (EDT))
- ZIP Code: 08041 – Jobstown; 08042 – Juliustown
- Area code: 609
- FIPS code: 3400569990
- GNIS feature ID: 0882106
- Website: www.springfieldtownshipnj.org

Springfield Township is a township in Burlington County, in the U.S. state of New Jersey. As of the 2020 United States census, the township's population was 3,245, a decrease of 169 (−5.0%) from the 2010 census count of 3,414, which in turn reflected an increase of 187 (+5.8%) from the 3,227 counted in the 2000 census. The township, and all of Burlington County, is a part of the Philadelphia metropolitan area.

== History ==
Springfield was originally formed on November 6, 1688, and reformed by Royal charter on January 13, 1713. Springfield Township was incorporated by the Township Act of 1798 of the New Jersey Legislature on February 21, 1798, as one of New Jersey's initial group of 104 townships. Portions of the township were taken on December 2, 1723, to form New Hanover Township. The township's name derives from springs and brooks in the area.

== Geography ==
According to the United States Census Bureau, the township had a total area of 29.57 square miles (76.58 km^{2}), including 29.51 square miles (76.44 km^{2}) of land and 0.06 square miles (0.15 km^{2}) of water (0.19%).

Jobstown (2020 Census population of 369) and Juliustown (362) are unincorporated communities and census-designated places (CDP) located entirely within Springfield Township, while Fort Dix (total population of 7,716 as of 2010) is a CDP located in parts of Springfield Township, New Hanover Township and Pemberton Township.

Other unincorporated communities, localities and place names located partially or completely within the township include Arneys Mount, Chambers Corner, Ellis, Folwell, Jacksonville, Pine Lane and Powell.

The township borders the Burlington County municipalities of Burlington Township, Chesterfield Township, Eastampton Township, Florence Township, Mansfield Township, North Hanover Township, Pemberton Township and Wrightstown.

The township is one of 56 South Jersey municipalities that are included within the New Jersey Pinelands National Reserve, a protected natural area of unique ecology covering 1,100,000 acres (450,000 ha), that has been classified as a United States Biosphere Reserve and established by Congress in 1978 as the nation's first National Reserve. Part of the township is included in the state-designated Pinelands Area, which includes portions of Burlington County, along with areas in Atlantic, Camden, Cape May, Cumberland, Gloucester and Ocean counties.

== Demographics ==
Historical population
Census	Pop.	Note	%±
1810	1,500		—
1820	1,568		4.5%
1830	1,534		−2.2%
1840	1,632		6.4%
1850	1,827		11.9%
1860	1,810		−0.9%
1870	1,761		−2.7%
1880	1,886		7.1%
1890	1,670		−11.5%
1900	1,382		−17.2%
1910	1,278		−7.5%
1920	1,223		−4.3%
1930	1,326		8.4%
1940	1,299		−2.0%
1950	1,562		20.2%
1960	1,956		25.2%
1970	2,244		14.7%
1980	2,691		19.9%
1990	3,028		12.5%
2000	3,227		6.6%
2010	3,414		5.8%
2020	3,245		−5.0%
2023 (est.)	3,251		0.2%
Population sources: 1810–2000 1810–1920 1840; 1850–1870 1850 1870; 1890–1910 1910–1930; 1940–2000 2000; 2010 2020

=== 2010 census ===
The 2010 United States census counted 3,414 people, 1,162 households, and 941 families in the township. The population density was 114.0 per square mile (44.0/km^{2}). There were 1,217 housing units at an average density of 40.6 per square mile (15.7/km^{2}). The racial makeup was 90.60% (3,093) White, 3.81% (130) Black or African American, 0.21% (7) Native American, 2.55% (87) Asian, 0.00% (0) Pacific Islander, 1.20% (41) from other races, and 1.64% (56) from two or more races. Hispanic or Latino of any race were 3.72% (127) of the population.

Of the 1,162 households, 33.7% had children under the age of 18; 69.4% were married couples living together; 7.7% had a female householder with no husband present and 19.0% were non-families. Of all households, 13.3% were made up of individuals and 5.4% had someone living alone who was 65 years of age or older. The average household size was 2.93 and the average family size was 3.24.

23.0% of the population were under the age of 18, 8.0% from 18 to 24, 20.3% from 25 to 44, 35.4% from 45 to 64, and 13.3% who were 65 years of age or older. The median age was 44.3 years. For every 100 females, the population had 102.9 males. For every 100 females ages 18 and older there were 103.0 males.

The Census Bureau's 2006–2010 American Community Survey showed that (in 2010 inflation-adjusted dollars) median household income was $85,417 (with a margin of error of +/− $13,463) and the median family income was $102,337 (+/− $14,017). Males had a median income of $62,813 (+/− $16,928) versus $47,361 (+/− $11,194) for females. The per capita income for the borough was $37,901 (+/− $4,219). About 2.6% of families and 3.4% of the population were below the poverty line, including 2.8% of those under age 18 and 1.4% of those age 65 or over.

=== 2000 census ===
As of the 2000 United States census there were 3,227 people, 1,098 households, and 906 families residing in the township. The population density was 107.4 inhabitants per square mile (41.5/km^{2}). There were 1,138 housing units at an average density of 37.9 per square mile (14.6/km^{2}). The racial makeup of the township was 91.94% White, 3.22% African American, 0.31% Native American, 2.63% Asian, 0.22% from other races, and 1.67% from two or more races. Hispanic or Latino of any race were 1.77% of the population.

There were 1,098 households, out of which 36.7% had children under the age of 18 living with them, 73.4% were married couples living together, 5.8% had a female householder with no husband present, and 17.4% were non-families. 13.3% of all households were made up of individuals, and 5.4% had someone living alone who was 65 years of age or older. The average household size was 2.93 and the average family size was 3.22.

In the township the population was spread out, with 25.8% under the age of 18, 5.7% from 18 to 24, 29.0% from 25 to 44, 28.7% from 45 to 64, and 10.7% who were 65 years of age or older. The median age was 39 years. For every 100 females, there were 100.1 males. For every 100 females age 18 and over, there were 97.7 males.

The median income for a household in the township was $69,268, and the median income for a family was $72,292. Males had a median income of $49,044 versus $31,392 for females. The per capita income for the township was $29,322. About 2.8% of families and 3.6% of the population were below the poverty line, including 1.2% of those under age 18 and 8.5% of those age 65 or over.

== Parks and recreation ==
Burlington County Fairgrounds (home of the annual Farm Fair) opened in 2011 at the intersection of Route 206 and Columbus-Jobstown Road.

== Government ==
=== Local government ===
Springfield Township operates within the Faulkner Act (formally known as the Optional Municipal Charter Law) under the Council-Manager form of municipal government, implemented by direct petition as of January 1, 2001, having been approved by voters in a November 1999 referendum. The township is one of 42 municipalities (of the 564) statewide that use this form of government. The Township Council is comprised of five members elected at-large in a partisan vote to four-year terms on a staggered basis, with either two or three seats coming up for election in even-numbered years as part of the November general election. At a reorganization meeting held during the first week of January following each election, the council selects a mayor and deputy mayor from among its members to serve two-year terms of office.

As of 2023, members of the Springfield Township Council are Mayor David Frank (R, term on council ends December 31, 2024; term as mayor ends 2023), Deputy Mayor Andrew Eaton (R, term on council ends 2024; term as deputy mayor ends 2023), Patrick Hermesmann (R, 2026), Denis McDaniel (R, 2026) and Peter Sobotka (R, 2026).

=== Federal, state and county representation ===
Springfield Township is located in the 3rd Congressional District and is part of New Jersey's 8th state legislative district. Prior to the 2010 Census, Springfield Township had been part of the 4th Congressional District, a change made by the New Jersey Redistricting Commission that took effect in January 2013, based on the results of the November 2012 general elections.

For the 119th United States Congress, New Jersey's 3rd congressional district is currently represented Herb Conaway (D, Delran Township). New Jersey is represented in the United States Senate by Democrats Cory Booker (Newark, term ends 2027) and Andy Kim (Moorestown, term ends 2031).

For the 2026–2027 session, the 8th legislative district of the New Jersey Legislature is represented in the New Jersey Senate by Latham Tiver (R, Southampton Township) and in the General Assembly by Anthony Angelozzi (D, Hammonton) and Andrea Katz (D, Chesterfield Township).

Burlington County is governed by a Board of County Commissioners comprised of five members who are chosen at-large in partisan elections to serve three-year terms of office on a staggered basis, with either one or two seats coming up for election each year; at an annual reorganization meeting, the board selects a director and deputy director from among its members to serve a one-year term. As of 2026, Burlington County's Commissioners are: Director Felicia Hopson (D, Willingboro Township, term as commissioner ends December 31, 2027; term as director ends 2026), Deputy Director Allison Eckel (D, Medford, term as commissioner ends 2028; term as deputy director ends 2026), Randy Brolo (D, Lumberton, 2026; elected to an unexpired term), Tyler Burrell (D, Delran Township, 2027) and Tom Pullion (D, Edgewater Park, 2026).

Burlington County's constitutional officers are Clerk Joanne Schwartz (D, Southampton Township, 2028), Sheriff James H. Kostoplis (D, Bordentown, 2028) and Surrogate Brian J. Carlin (D, Burlington Township, 2026).

=== Politics ===
United States presidential election results for Springfield Township 2024 2020 2016 2012 2008 2004
Year	Republican		Democratic		Third party(ies)	
Year	No.	%	No.	%	No.	%
2024	1,213	60.29%	770	38.27%	29	1.44%
2020	1,251	58.24%	870	40.50%	27	1.26%
2016	1,168	61.09%	659	34.47%	85	4.45%
2012	1,071	57.92%	743	40.18%	35	1.89%
2008	1,086	57.40%	773	40.86%	33	1.74%
2004	1,083	61.22%	656	37.08%	30	1.70%

As of March 2011, there were a total of 2,380 registered voters in Springfield Township, of which 403 (16.9% vs. 33.3% countywide) were registered as Democrats, 1,268 (53.3% vs. 23.9%) were registered as Republicans and 707 (29.7% vs. 42.8%) were registered as Unaffiliated. There were 2 voters registered as either Libertarians or Greens. Among the township's 2010 Census population, 69.7% (vs. 61.7% in Burlington County) were registered to vote, including 90.5% of those ages 18 and over (vs. 80.3% countywide).

In the 2012 presidential election, Republican Mitt Romney received 1,071 votes here (57.5% vs. 40.2% countywide), ahead of Democrat Barack Obama with 743 votes (39.9% vs. 58.1%) and other candidates with 35 votes (1.9% vs. 1.0%), among the 1,864 ballots cast by the township's 2,453 registered voters, for a turnout of 76.0% (vs. 74.5% in Burlington County). In the 2008 presidential election, Republican John McCain received 1,086 votes here (56.7% vs. 39.9% countywide), ahead of Democrat Barack Obama with 773 votes (40.4% vs. 58.4%) and other candidates with 33 votes (1.7% vs. 1.0%), among the 1,914 ballots cast by the township's 2,371 registered voters, for a turnout of 80.7% (vs. 80.0% in Burlington County). In the 2004 presidential election, Republican George W. Bush received 1,083 votes here (60.5% vs. 46.0% countywide), ahead of Democrat John Kerry with 656 votes (36.6% vs. 52.9%) and other candidates with 30 votes (1.7% vs. 0.8%), among the 1,791 ballots cast by the township's 2,199 registered voters, for a turnout of 81.4% (vs. 78.8% in the whole county).

Gubernatorial election results for Springfield Township
Year	Republican		Democratic		Third party(ies)	
Year	No.	%	No.	%	No.	%
2025	1,018	60.27%	660	39.08%	11	0.65%
2021	970	67.36%	463	32.15%	7	0.49%
2017	694	62.81%	391	35.38%	20	1.81%
2013	932	74.32%	299	23.84%	23	1.83%
2009	960	64.56%	422	28.38%	105	7.06%
2005	728	61.69%	377	31.95%	75	6.36%

In the 2013 gubernatorial election, Republican Chris Christie received 932 votes here (72.9% vs. 61.4% countywide), ahead of Democrat Barbara Buono with 299 votes (23.4% vs. 35.8%) and other candidates with 23 votes (1.8% vs. 1.2%), among the 1,279 ballots cast by the township's 2,408 registered voters, yielding a 53.1% turnout (vs. 44.5% in the county). In the 2009 gubernatorial election, Republican Chris Christie received 960 votes here (63.1% vs. 47.7% countywide), ahead of Democrat Jon Corzine with 422 votes (27.7% vs. 44.5%), Independent Chris Daggett with 80 votes (5.3% vs. 4.8%) and other candidates with 25 votes (1.6% vs. 1.2%), among the 1,522 ballots cast by the township's 2,412 registered voters, yielding a 63.1% turnout (vs. 44.9% in the county).

United States Senate election results for Springfield Township1
Year	Republican		Democratic		Third party(ies)	
Year	No.	%	No.	%	No.	%
2024	1,108	56.88%	817	41.94%	23	1.18%
2018	989	63.52%	488	31.34%	80	5.14%
2012	1,025	58.44%	708	40.36%	21	1.20%
2006	913	62.88%	506	34.85%	33	2.27%

United States Senate election results for Springfield Township2
Year	Republican		Democratic		Third party(ies)	
Year	No.	%	No.	%	No.	%
2020	1,228	59.70%	801	38.94%	28	1.36%
2014	726	65.23%	365	32.79%	22	1.98%
2013	547	69.86%	224	28.61%	12	1.53%
2008	1,055	61.41%	622	36.20%	41	2.39%

== Education ==
The Springfield Township School District serves students in pre-kindergarten through sixth grade at Springfield Township School. As of the 2023–24 school year, the district, comprised of one school, had an enrollment of 289 students and 22.0 classroom teachers (on an FTE basis), for a student–teacher ratio of 13.2:1.

Public school students in seventh through twelfth grades attend the schools of the Northern Burlington County Regional School District, which also serves students from Chesterfield Township, Mansfield Township, North Hanover Township, along with children of military personnel based at Joint Base McGuire–Dix–Lakehurst. As of the 2023–24 school year, the regional high school district, comprised of two schools, had an enrollment of 2,135 students and 173.5 classroom teachers (on an FTE basis), for a student–teacher ratio of 12.3:1. The schools in the district (with 2023–24 enrollment data from the National Center for Education Statistics) are Northern Burlington County Regional Middle School with 718 students in grades 7–8 and Northern Burlington County Regional High School with 1,381 students in grades 9–12. Both schools are in the Columbus section of Mansfield Township. Using a formula that reflects the population and the value of the assessed property in each of the constituent municipalities, taxpayers in Springfield Township pay 17.7% of the district's tax levy. The 7–12 district's board of education has nine members, who are elected directly by voters to serve three-year terms of office on a staggered basis, with three seats up for election each year. The nine seats on the regional district's board of education are allocated based on the population of the constituent municipalities, with one seat assigned to Springfield Township.

Students from Springfield Township, and from all of Burlington County, are eligible to attend the Burlington County Institute of Technology, a countywide public school district that serves the vocational and technical education needs of students at the high school and post-secondary level at its campuses in Medford and Westampton.

== Transportation ==
As of May 2010, the township had a total of 72.72 miles (117.03 km) of roadways, of which 34.05 miles (54.80 km) were maintained by the municipality, 29.29 miles (47.14 km) by Burlington County and 7.01 miles (11.28 km) by the New Jersey Department of Transportation and 2.37 miles (3.81 km) by the New Jersey Turnpike Authority.

The major limited access roads that traverse are the New Jersey Turnpike and Interstate 295, both in the western part of the township. No interchanges along these highways are located in the township, with the closest interchanges that are accessible are Exit 47 (along I-295) in neighboring Burlington Township and Exits 5, 6A and 6 (along the Turnpike) in neighboring Westampton, Florence and Mansfield townships, respectively.

State and U.S. routes include U.S. Route 206 that runs through the center and Route 68 in the eastern section. The major county routes that pass through are County Route 537 in the eastern part and County Route 545 also in the eastern part briefly.

There is no public transportation available in the township.

== Points of interest ==
- Old Upper Springfield Friends Burying Ground – The cemetery and the accompanying meeting house were placed on both the New Jersey (state ID # 875) and the National Register of Historic Places (Reference # 79001479) in 1979.
- Columbus Farmers Market, on Route 206, is a regional commercial center.
- Pandora Diner (original location, and formerly the Esquire Diner) at the intersection of Route 206 and County Route 537. The diner opened in 2017, and now has locations in Cinnaminson Township and Williamstown.

== Notable people ==
People who were born in, residents of, or otherwise closely associated with Springfield Township include:

- Reading Wood Black (1830–1867), founder of Uvalde County, Texas and the city of Uvalde, Texas
- Irving Fryar (born 1962), former NFL wide receiver
- Phil Haines (born 1950), New Jersey Superior Court judge who served in the New Jersey Senate from 2008 to 2010
- Reuben Moon (1847–1919), Congressman who represented Pennsylvania's 4th congressional district
- Thomas Newbold (1760–1823), member of the United States House of Representatives for New Jersey from 1807 to 1813
- Joe Ohl (1888–1951), MLB pitcher who played for the Washington Senators
- Daniel Trotter (1747–1800), furniture maker from Philadelphia, bought 12 acres of land in Springfield Township in 1781
- Barclay White (1821–1906), Superintendent of Indian Affairs during the administration of President Ulysses S. Grant
- Walter Livingston Wright (1872–1946), professor of mathematics and president of Lincoln University.
