= New Hanover Township School District =

School district in Burlington County, New Jersey, US

Address
- 122 Fort Dix Street Wrightstown, Burlington County, New Jersey, 08562; United States
- Coordinates: 40.037796°N 74.618045°W

District information
- Grades: Pre-K to 8
- Superintendent: Scott Larkin
- Business administrator: Bernard Biesiada
- Schools: 1

Students and staff
- Enrollment: 197 (as of 2023–24)
- Faculty: 19.4 FTEs
- Student–teacher ratio: 10.2:1

Other information
- District Factor Group: B
- Website: www.newhanover.k12.nj.us
Ind.	Per pupil	District spending	Rank (*)	K-8 average	%± vs. average
1A	Total Spending	$21,276	48	$18,891	12.6%
1	Budgetary Cost	20,538	63	14,159	45.1%
2	Classroom Instruction	12,598	66	8,659	45.5%
6	Support Services	3,647	59	2,167	68.3%
8	Administrative Cost	1,751	45	1,547	13.2%
10	Operations & Maintenance	2,241	54	1,612	39.0%
13	Extracurricular Activities	175	44	104	68.3%
16	Median Teacher Salary	61,383	52	61,136
Data from NJDoE 2014 Taxpayers' Guide to Education Spending. *Of K-8 districts with up to 400 students. Lowest spending=1; Highest=71

The New Hanover Township School District is a consolidated public school district that serves students in pre-kindergarten through eighth grade from non-military portions of New Hanover Township (including its Cookstown section) and Wrightstown, two communities in Burlington County, in the U.S. state of New Jersey.

As of the 2023–24 school year, the district, comprised of one school, had an enrollment of 197 students and 19.4 classroom teachers (on an FTE basis), for a student–teacher ratio of 10.2:1.

For ninth through twelfth grades, students from both New Hanover Township and Wrightstown attend Bordentown Regional High School as part of a sending/receiving relationship with the Bordentown Regional School District, a regional K-12 school district that serves students from Bordentown City, Bordentown Township and Fieldsboro Borough. As of the 2023–24 school year, the high school had an enrollment of 762 students and 55.5 classroom teachers (on an FTE basis), for a student–teacher ratio of 13.7:1.

== History ==
In the 2016-17 school year, the district had the 40th-smallest enrollment of any school district in the state.

The district had been classified by the New Jersey Department of Education as being in District Factor Group "B", the second lowest of eight groupings. District Factor Groups organize districts statewide to allow comparison by common socioeconomic characteristics of the local districts. From lowest socioeconomic status to highest, the categories are A, B, CD, DE, FG, GH, I and J.

== Attendance boundary ==
The district only includes portions of the township not on the property of Joint Base McGuire–Dix–Lakehurst. Students living on the base have choices of three school districts, none of them being New Hanover schools.

== School ==
New Hanover Township School had an enrollment of 186 students in grades PreK–8 as of the 2023–24 school year.

== Administration ==
Core members of the district's administration are:

- Scott Larkin, superintendent
- Bernard Biesiada, business administrator and board secretary

== Board of education ==
The district's board of education, comprised of seven members, sets policy and oversees the fiscal and educational operation of the district through its administration. As a Type II school district, the board's trustees are elected directly by voters to serve three-year terms of office on a staggered basis, with either two or three seats up for election each year held (since 2012) as part of the November general election. The board appoints a superintendent to oversee the district's day-to-day operations and a business administrator to supervise the business functions of the district.
