= New Jersey Route 68 =

State highway in Burlington County, New Jersey, US

Route 68
- Fort Dix Access Highway

Route information
- Maintained by NJDOT
- Length: 7.92 mi (12.75 km)
- Existed: January 1, 1953–present

Major junctions
- South end: CR 616 in New Hanover Township (Fort Dix)
- CR 537 in Springfield Township
- North end: US 206 in Mansfield Township

Location
- Country: United States
- State: New Jersey
- Counties: Burlington

Highway system
- New Jersey State Highway Routes; Interstate; US; State; Scenic Byways
← Route 67	→ Route 69

Route 68 is a state highway located in Burlington County in the U.S. state of New Jersey, serving as the main connector between the New Jersey Turnpike and the Fort Dix entity of Joint Base McGuire–Dix–Lakehurst (JB MDL). It runs from County Route 616 (CR 616) inside Fort Dix to U.S. Route 206 (US 206) in Mansfield Township, 0.34 mi (0.55 km) south of the New Jersey Turnpike; a total route length of 7.92 mi (12.75 km). The route passes through Wrightstown and Springfield Township as a two-lane undivided road, crossing CR 537. It continues through Mansfield Township as a four-lane divided highway, intersecting with CR 543. Outside of ASA Fort Dix, Route 68 passes through mostly agricultural and residential areas.

The route was originally designated as Route S39 in 1941, a spur of Route 39 (present-day US 206) that was to provide improved access to Fort Dix during World War II. In 1953, Route S39 became Route 68 and it was legislated to extend south of Fort Dix to the Four Mile Circle with Route 70 and Route 72. A freeway for Route 68 was proposed to run between a planned Route 38 freeway and the Four Mile Circle in 1960; however, it was never built.

== Route description ==
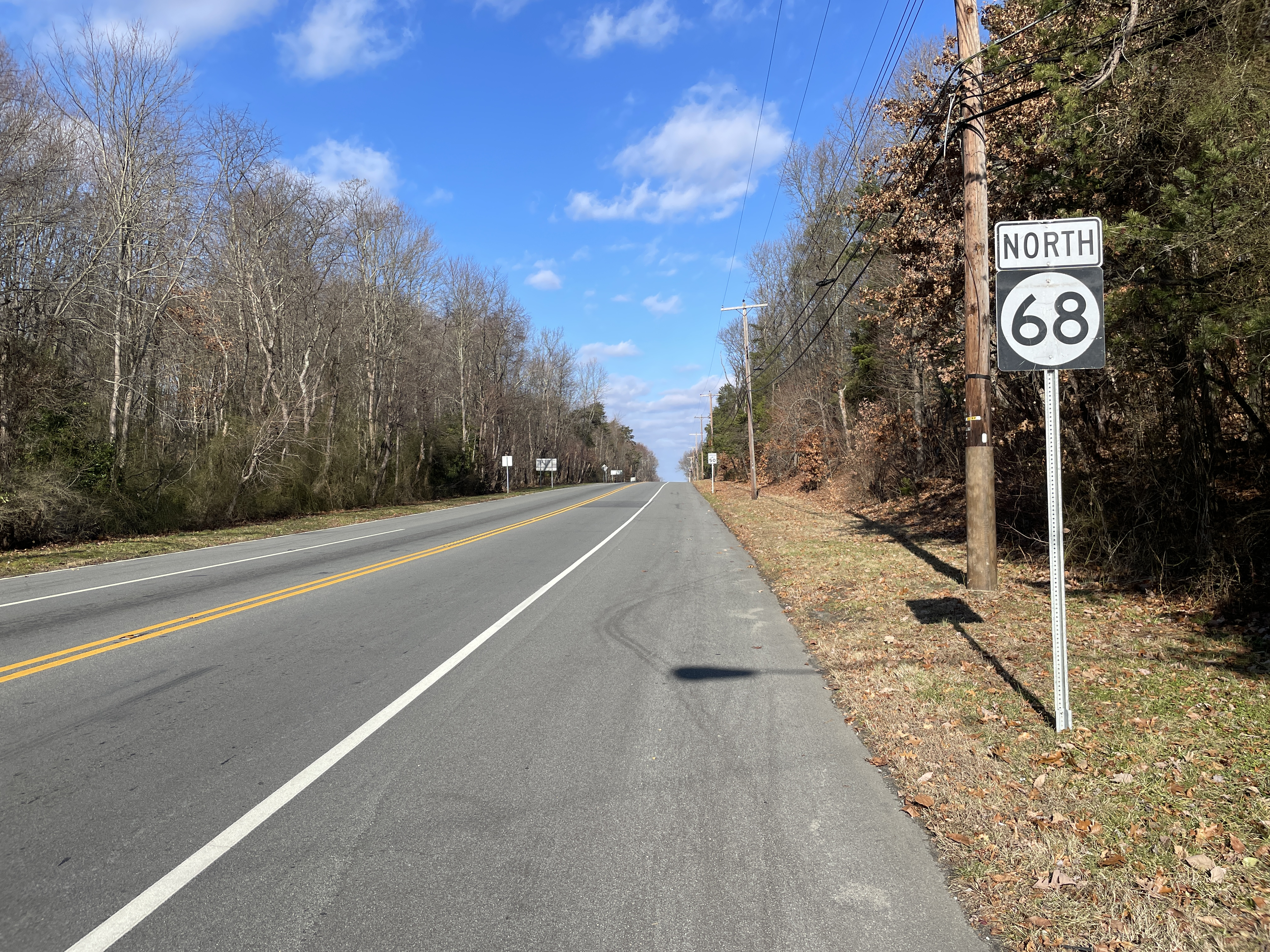
Route 68 northbound past CR 670 in Springfield Township

Route 68 begins at General Circle (inaccessible to the general public) with CR 616 on the grounds of the Fort Dix entity of JB MDL in New Hanover Township, heading to the north as a four-lane divided highway called Fort Dix Road. After passing through the Main Gate to Fort Dix and heading east of the Visitor Center for Fort Dix, the road continues through public areas of the military installation and crosses into Wrightstown, where it narrows into a two-lane undivided road before heading into Springfield Township. The route exits JB MDL at its intersection with CR 670 and upon leaving the military base, it heads through a mix of farmland and woodland. Route 68 crosses CR 537 before continuing north into agricultural areas with some homes.

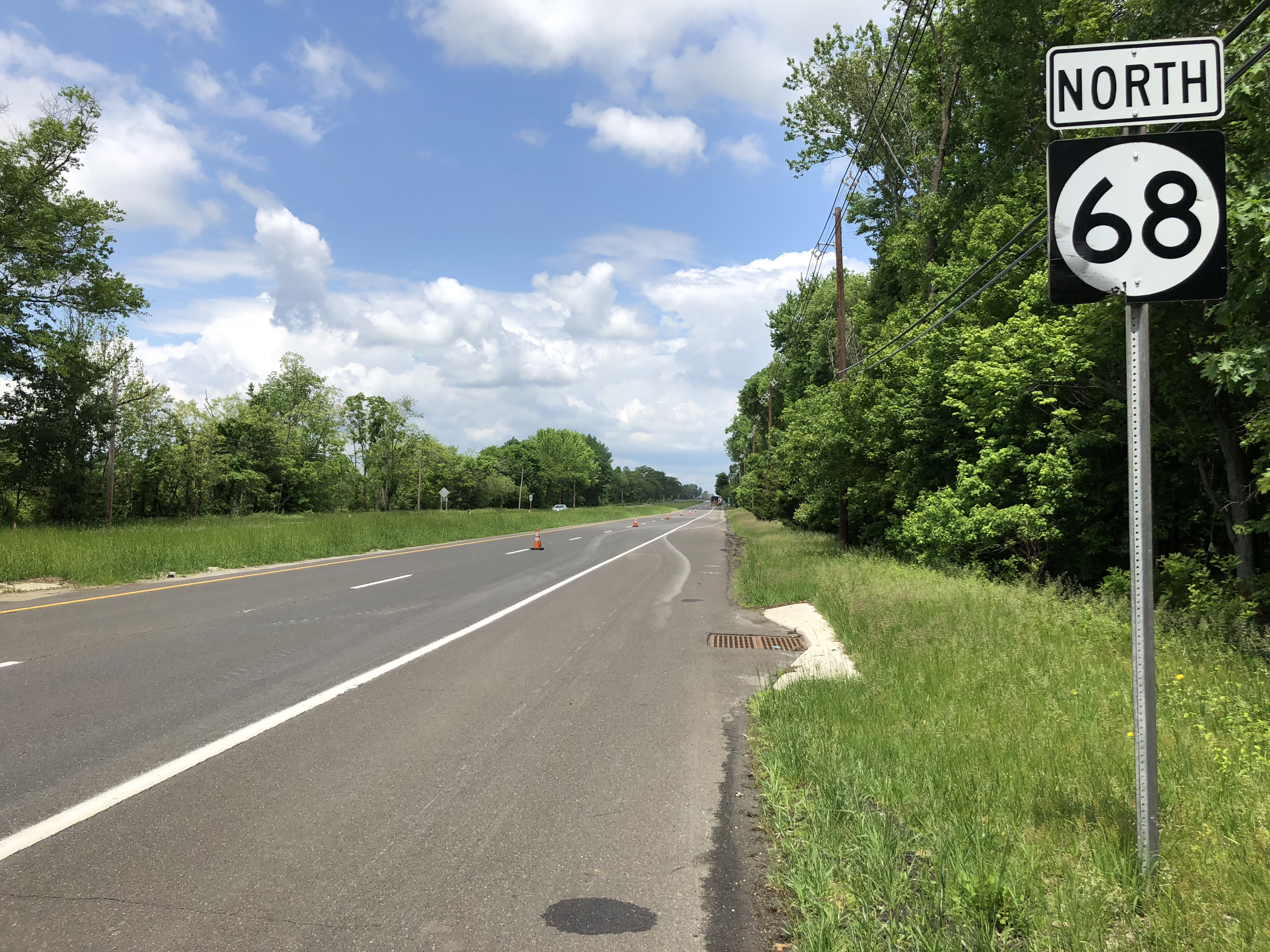
View north along Route 68 at CR 543 in Mansfield

The road enters Mansfield Township where it widens into a four-lane divided highway as it intersects a road that provides access to parallel CR 545 to the east, which heads south to serve as an access road to McGuire Air Force Base. From here, the route turns northwest and crosses CR 543 before heading through a mix of farm fields and suburban residential neighborhoods. Past the intersection with White Pine Road, Route 68 passes in between two large auto auction lots. The route terminates at an intersection with US 206 located a short distance south of that route's interchange with the New Jersey Turnpike (Interstate 95). Route 68 serves as the main access route between Fort Dix and the New Jersey Turnpike.

== History ==
Route S39
- Location: Fort Dix–Mansfield Township
- Existed: 1941–1953

As part of improving road access to the Fort Dix Military Reservation at the onset of World War II, a Works Progress Administration project improved the paved road connecting the fort to Bordentown. In 1941, this road was legislated as Route S39, a state highway spur of Route 39 (now US 206) that was to run from the fort to Mansfield Square. Construction on the access road was completed in 1943 at a cost of over $2 million. Route S39 became Route 68 in the 1953 New Jersey state highway renumbering. The same year, an extension of Route 68 was legislated to run south from Fort Dix to the intersection with Route 70 and Route 72 at the Four Mile Circle. In 1961, a freeway was proposed along the Route 68 corridor, running from a planned Route 38 freeway near Fort Dix south to Route 70 and Route 72; however, this was never built.

== Major intersections ==
The entire route is in Burlington County.

Location	mi	km	Destinations	Notes
New Hanover Township	0.00	0.00	CR 616 (Pemberton–Wrightstown Road) – Pemberton	General Circle; southern terminus
New Hanover Township	0.00– 0.22	0.00– 0.35	Fort Dix Main Gate; Road closed to general public since September 11, 2001	
Springfield Township	2.85	4.59	CR 537 (Monmouth Road) – Jobstown, Jacobstown	
Mansfield Township	4.00	6.44	To CR 545 – Trenton, McGuire AFB	
Mansfield Township	4.30	6.92	CR 543 (School House Road) – Columbus, Georgetown	
Mansfield Township	7.92	12.75	US 206 to N.J. Turnpike	Northern terminus
1.000 mi = 1.609 km; 1.000 km = 0.621 mi
