= Edward S. Godfrey (physician) =

American epidemiologist (1878–1960)

Edward Settle Godfrey Jr.

Commissioner of Health of the State of New York
- In office April 21, 1936 – May 1, 1947
- Governor: Franklin D. Roosevelt; Herbert H. Lehman; Charles Poletti; Thomas E. Dewey
- Preceded by: Thomas Parran
- Succeeded by: Herman E. Hilleboe

Personal details
- Born: 1878
- Died: December 13, 1960
- Profession: physician

Edward Settle Godfrey Jr. (1878–December 13, 1960), son of Edward Settle Godfrey, was a physician and epidemiologist, the founder of the first epidemiological society in the United States. He studied the epidemiology of diphtheria and tuberculosis. From April 21, 1936 until he retired on May 1, 1947, he was the New York State Commissioner of Health.

== Awards and honors ==
- 1951 Sedgwick Memorial Medal
