= Wrightstown, New Jersey =

Borough in Burlington County, New Jersey, US

- Borough
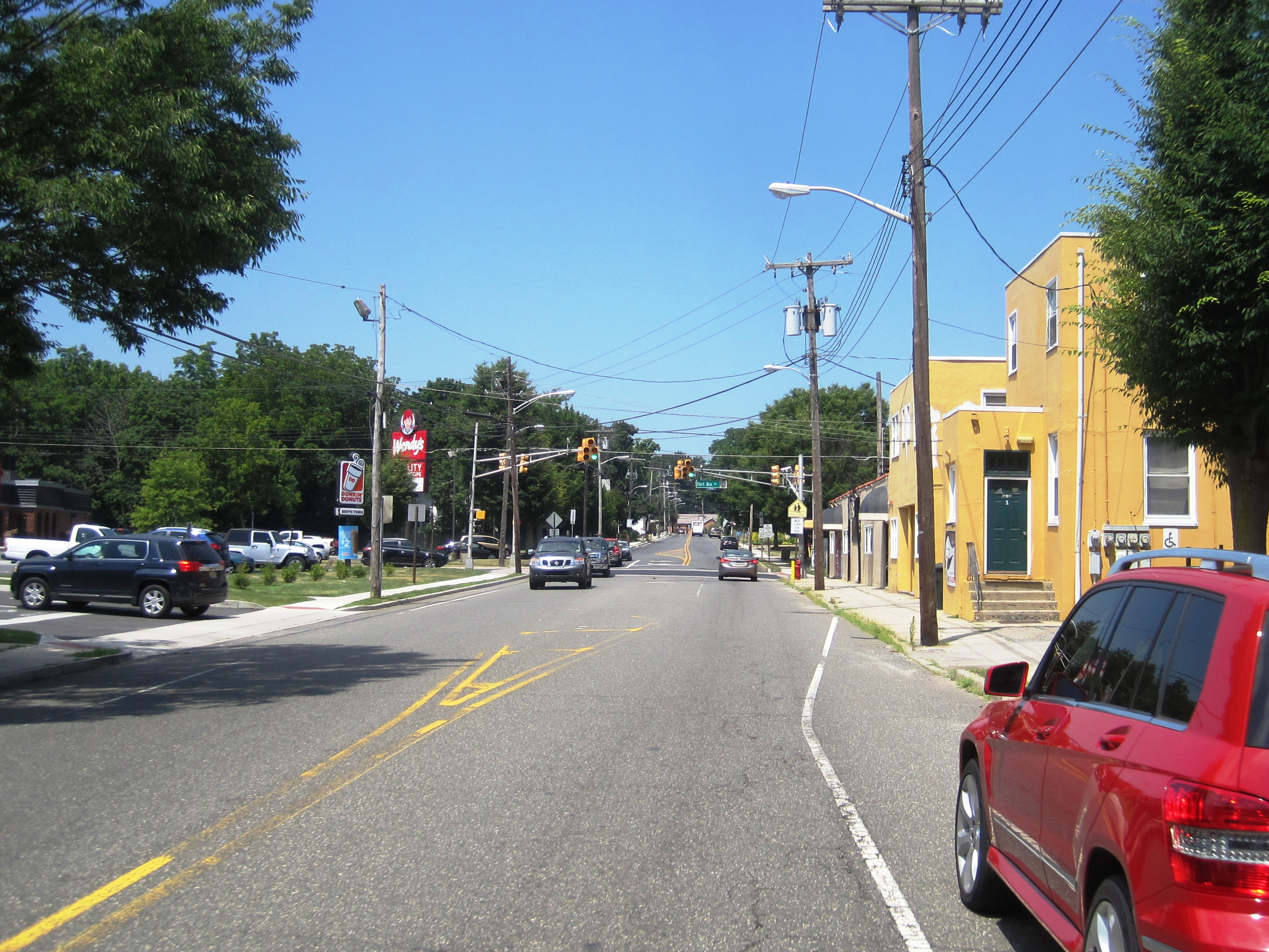
- Center of the borough along East Main Street (County Route 616)

- Seal
- Motto: "Gateway to Freedom"
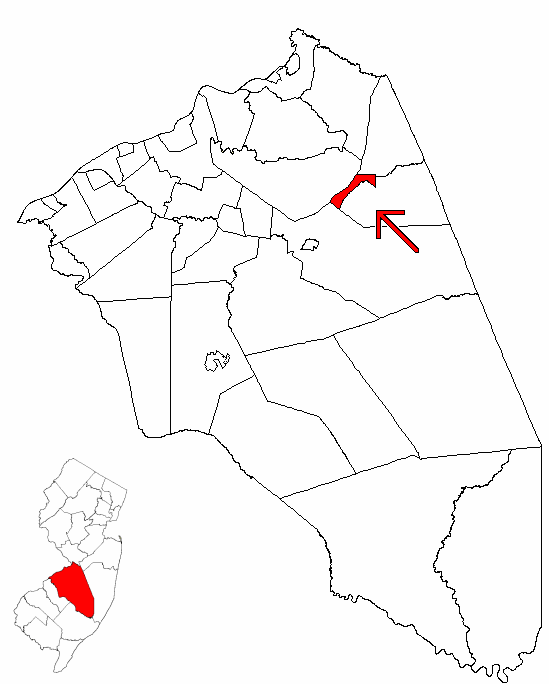
- Wrightstown highlighted in Burlington County. Inset map: Burlington County highlighted in the State of New Jersey.

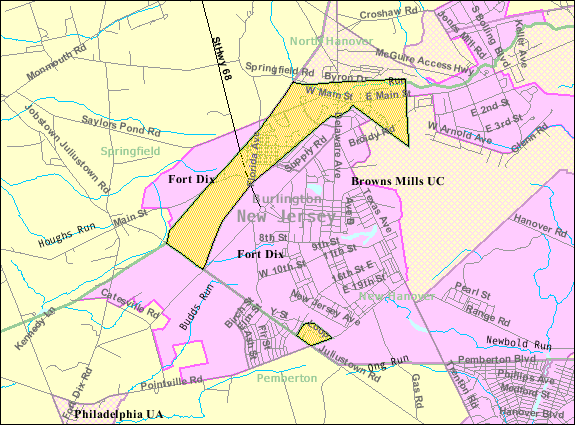
- Census Bureau map of Wrightstown, New Jersey

- Location in Burlington County Location in New Jersey Location in the United States
- Coordinates: 40.025589°N 74.631908°W
- Country: United States
- State: New Jersey
- County: Burlington
- Incorporated: March 26, 1918

Government
  - Type: Borough
  - Body: Borough Council
  - Mayor: Donald Cottrell (R, unexpired term ending December 31, 2024)
  - Municipal clerk: Freda Gorman

Area
  - Total: 1.85 sq mi (4.79 km^{2})
  - Land: 1.85 sq mi (4.79 km^{2})
  - Water: 0 sq mi (0.00 km^{2}) 0.00%
  - Rank: 423rd of 565 in state 33rd of 40 in county
- Elevation: 151 ft (46 m)

Population (2020)
  - Total: 720
  - Estimate (2023): 722
  - Rank: 546th of 565 in state 38th of 40 in county
  - Density: 389.1/sq mi (150.2/km^{2})
  - Rank: 460th of 565 in state 32nd of 40 in county
- Time zone: UTC−05:00 (Eastern (EST))
  - Summer (DST): UTC−04:00 (Eastern (EDT))
- ZIP Code: 08562
- Area code: 609 exchanges: 723, 724, 752, 758
- FIPS code: 3400582960
- GNIS feature ID: 0885453
- Website: www.wrightstownborough.com

Wrightstown is a borough in Burlington County, in the U.S. state of New Jersey. As of the 2020 United States census, the borough's population was 720, a decrease of 82 (−10.2%) from the 2010 census count of 802, which in turn reflected an increase of 54 (+7.2%) from the 748 counted in the 2000 census.

Wrightstown was incorporated as a borough by an act of the New Jersey Legislature on March 4, 1918, from portions of New Hanover Township and North Hanover Township, based on the results of a referendum held on March 26, 1918. The borough was named for John Wright, an early settler who contributed the land that became the settlement of Wrightstown.

== Geography ==
According to the U.S. Census Bureau, the borough had a total area of 1.85 square miles (4.79 km^{2}), all of which was land.

The borough borders the Burlington County municipalities of New Hanover Township, North Hanover Township, Pemberton Township, and Springfield Township, as well as the McGuire AFB and Fort Dix entities of Joint Base McGuire-Dix-Lakehurst.

The borough is one of 56 South Jersey municipalities that are included within the New Jersey Pinelands National Reserve, a protected natural area of unique ecology covering 1,100,000 acres (450,000 ha), that has been classified as a United States Biosphere Reserve and established by Congress in 1978 as the nation's first National Reserve. Part of the borough is included in the state-designated Pinelands Area, which includes portions of Burlington County, along with areas in Atlantic, Camden, Cape May, Cumberland, Gloucester and Ocean counties.

== Demographics ==
Historical population
Census	Pop.	Note	%±
1920	270		—
1930	176		−34.8%
1940	241		36.9%
1950	1,199		397.5%
1960	4,846		304.2%
1970	2,719		−43.9%
1980	3,031		11.5%
1990	3,843		26.8%
2000	746		−80.6%
2010	802		7.5%
2020	720		−10.2%
2023 (est.)	722	▲	0.3%
Population sources: 1920–2000; 1920 1920–1930 1940–2000; 1960–2000 2000; 2010 2020

Jozsef A. Farago, a former mayor of Wrightstown, criticized the 2000 Census data that showed that the borough's population had dropped 80%, to 748 from 3,843 a decade earlier, noting that the 1990 population had been inflated and that the conversion of Fort Dix to a reserve base had caused a decrease but that the borough's master plan showed a population of 838.

=== 2010 census ===
The 2010 United States census counted 802 people, 309 households, and 189 families in the borough. The population density was 453.6 per square mile (175.1/km^{2}). There were 348 housing units at an average density of 196.8 per square mile (76.0/km^{2}). The racial makeup was 47.38% (380) White, 21.07% (169) Black or African American, 0.75% (6) Native American, 5.99% (48) Asian, 0.37% (3) Pacific Islander, 18.70% (150) from other races, and 5.74% (46) from two or more races. Hispanic or Latino of any race were 28.05% (225) of the population.

Of the 309 households, 34.3% had children under the age of 18; 28.8% were married couples living together; 21.7% had a female householder with no husband present and 38.8% were non-families. Of all households, 28.5% were made up of individuals and 5.2% had someone living alone who was 65 years of age or older. The average household size was 2.60 and the average family size was 3.17.

26.9% of the population were under the age of 18, 14.1% from 18 to 24, 28.8% from 25 to 44, 22.3% from 45 to 64, and 7.9% who were 65 years of age or older. The median age was 29.9 years. For every 100 females, the population had 109.9 males. For every 100 females ages 18 and older there were 110.8 males.

The Census Bureau's 2006–2010 American Community Survey showed that (in 2010 inflation-adjusted dollars) median household income was $40,096 (with a margin of error of +/− $4,881) and the median family income was $38,438 (+/− $7,242). Males had a median income of $37,917 (+/− $22,280) versus $34,167 (+/− $13,020) for females. The per capita income for the borough was $24,231 (+/− $4,722). About 15.2% of families and 17.2% of the population were below the poverty line, including 31.6% of those under age 18 and none of those age 65 or over.

=== 2000 census ===
As of the 2000 United States census there were 748 people, 312 households, and 181 families residing in the borough. The population density was 425.1 inhabitants per square mile (164.1/km^{2}). There were 339 housing units at an average density of 192.7 per square mile (74.4/km^{2}). The racial makeup of the borough was 49.87% White, 30.21% African American, 0.53% Native American, 7.22% Asian, 7.22% from other races, and 4.95% from two or more races. Hispanic or Latino of any race were 11.23% of the population.

There were 312 households, out of which 33.3% had children under the age of 18 living with them, 28.2% were married couples living together, 25.3% had a female householder with no husband present, and 41.7% were non-families. 34.6% of all households were made up of individuals, and 7.4% had someone living alone who was 65 years of age or older. The average household size was 2.37 and the average family size was 3.09.

In the borough the population was spread out, with 29.7% under the age of 18, 10.2% from 18 to 24, 33.2% from 25 to 44, 18.4% from 45 to 64, and 8.6% who were 65 years of age or older. The median age was 31 years. For every 100 females, there were 94.8 males. For every 100 females age 18 and over, there were 88.5 males.

The median income for a household in the borough was $27,500, and the median income for a family was $29,375. Males had a median income of $28,889 versus $25,417 for females. The per capita income for the borough was $14,489. About 22.8% of families and 24.0% of the population were below the poverty line, including 31.8% of those under age 18 and 22.4% of those age 65 or over.

== Government ==
=== Local government ===
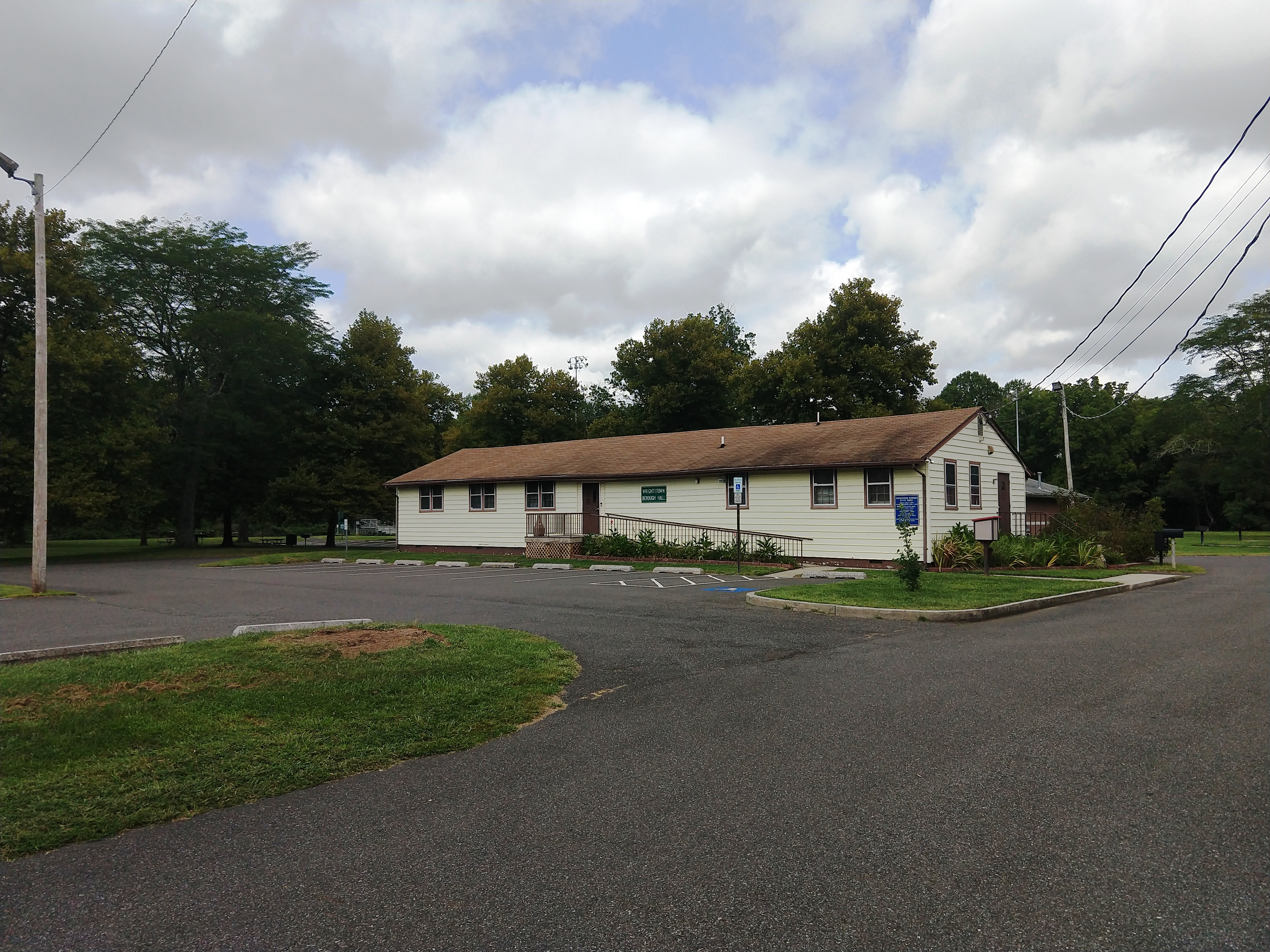
Wrightstown Borough Hall

Wrightstown is governed under the borough form of New Jersey municipal government, which is used in 218 municipalities (of the 564) statewide, making it the most common form of government in New Jersey. The governing body is comprised of a mayor and a borough council, with all positions elected at-large on a partisan basis as part of the November general election. A mayor is elected directly by the voters to a four-year term of office. The borough council includes six members elected to serve three-year terms on a staggered basis, with two seats coming up for election each year in a three-year cycle. The borough form of government used by Wrightstown is a "weak mayor / strong council" government in which council members act as the legislative body with the mayor presiding at meetings and voting only in the event of a tie. The mayor can veto ordinances subject to an override by a two-thirds majority vote of the council. The mayor makes committee and liaison assignments for council members, and most appointments are made by the mayor with the advice and consent of the council.

As of 2023, the mayor of Wrightstown is Republican Donald Cottrell, who was elected to serve a term of office ending December 31, 2024. Members of the Wrightstown Borough Council are Council President William L. Bird Jr. (R, 2023), Jason Bushnell (D, 2024; elected to serve an unexpired term), Donna L. Carroll (R, 2025), Joseph Craig (R, 2023; elected to serve an unexpired term), Jeanie L. Knapp (R, 2025) and Laurance R. Lownds (D, 2024), with one seat vacant.

After David Scott Timberman resigned from office in November 2021, the borough council selected Donald Cottrell from a list of three candidates to fill the seat expiring in December 2024.

In September 2019, the New Jersey State Comptroller referred a case involving Mayor Thomas Harper to the New Jersey Attorney General for possible criminal charges; it was alleged that the mayor had allowed a private company to dump 565,000 US gallons (2,140,000 L; 470,000 imp gal) of untreated septic tank waste into facilities operated by the borough's municipal utilities authority without the company having paid any fees. In September 2020, Mayor Harper was charged by the Attorney General's Office of Public Integrity and Accountability with lying to investigators, after he allegedly knowingly made false statements during the course of the Office of the Comptroller's investigation. Harper resigned from office later that month, but his named remained as the only candidate for mayor listed on the ballot in the November 2020 general election.

In July 2012, following the death of Brian Sperling in the previous month, the borough council selected William Bird to fill Sperling's vacancy on the council and picked Costic Michael Borsavage to take over his role as council president.

Jennifer Heisler, a councilmember who resigned in October 2010, was sentenced in November 2011 to five years of probation after pleading guilty to the theft of $20,000 from Wrightstown Volunteer Fire Company, of which she had been the treasurer.

=== Federal, state and county representation ===
Wrightstown is located in the 3rd Congressional District and is part of New Jersey's 8th state legislative district.

For the 119th United States Congress, New Jersey's 3rd congressional district is currently represented Herb Conaway (D, Delran Township). New Jersey is represented in the United States Senate by Democrats Cory Booker (Newark, term ends 2027) and Andy Kim (Moorestown, term ends 2031).

For the 2026–2027 session, the 8th legislative district of the New Jersey Legislature is represented in the New Jersey Senate by Latham Tiver (R, Southampton Township) and in the General Assembly by Anthony Angelozzi (D, Hammonton) and Andrea Katz (D, Chesterfield Township).

Burlington County is governed by a Board of County Commissioners comprised of five members who are chosen at-large in partisan elections to serve three-year terms of office on a staggered basis, with either one or two seats coming up for election each year; at an annual reorganization meeting, the board selects a director and deputy director from among its members to serve a one-year term. As of 2026, Burlington County's Commissioners are: Director Felicia Hopson (D, Willingboro Township, term as commissioner ends December 31, 2027; term as director ends 2026), Deputy Director Allison Eckel (D, Medford, term as commissioner ends 2028; term as deputy director ends 2026), Randy Brolo (D, Lumberton, 2026; elected to an unexpired term), Tyler Burrell (D, Delran Township, 2027) and Tom Pullion (D, Edgewater Park, 2026).

Burlington County's constitutional officers are Clerk Joanne Schwartz (D, Southampton Township, 2028), Sheriff James H. Kostoplis (D, Bordentown, 2028) and Surrogate Brian J. Carlin (D, Burlington Township, 2026).

=== Politics ===
United States presidential election results for Wrightstown 2024 2020 2016 2012 2008 2004
Year	Republican		Democratic		Third party(ies)	
Year	No.	%	No.	%	No.	%
2024	117	49.79%	114	48.51%	4	1.70%
2020	101	41.91%	136	56.43%	4	1.66%
2016	82	40.80%	115	57.21%	4	1.99%
2012	76	34.23%	143	64.41%	3	1.35%
2008	92	43.19%	118	55.40%	3	1.41%
2004	93	47.69%	99	50.77%	3	1.54%

As of March 2011, there were a total of 293 registered voters in Wrightstown, of which 75 (25.6% vs. 33.3% countywide) were registered as Democrats, 98 (33.4% vs. 23.9%) were registered as Republicans and 120 (41.0% vs. 42.8%) were registered as Unaffiliated. There were no voters registered to other parties. Among the borough's 2010 Census population, 36.5% (vs. 61.7% in Burlington County) were registered to vote, including 50.0% of those ages 18 and over (vs. 80.3% countywide).

Gubernatorial election results for Wrightstown
Year	Republican		Democratic		Third party(ies)	
Year	No.	%	No.	%	No.	%
2025	70	44.59%	87	55.41%	0	0.00%
2021	57	57.00%	42	42.00%	1	1.00%
2017	47	50.00%	43	45.74%	4	4.26%
2013	63	63.64%	35	35.35%	1	1.01%
2009	62	53.45%	47	40.52%	7	6.03%
2005	48	42.48%	56	49.56%	9	7.96%

In the 2012 presidential election, Democrat Barack Obama received 143 votes (63.6% vs. 58.1% countywide), ahead of Republican Mitt Romney with 76 votes (33.8% vs. 40.2%) and other candidates with 3 votes (1.3% vs. 1.0%), among the 225 ballots cast by the borough's 337 registered voters, for a turnout of 66.8% (vs. 74.5% in Burlington County). In the 2008 presidential election, Democrat Barack Obama received 118 votes (54.6% vs. 58.4% countywide), ahead of Republican John McCain with 92 votes (42.6% vs. 39.9%) and other candidates with 3 votes (1.4% vs. 1.0%), among the 216 ballots cast by the borough's 320 registered voters, for a turnout of 67.5% (vs. 80.0% in Burlington County). In the 2004 presidential election, Democrat John Kerry received 99 votes (49.5% vs. 52.9% countywide), ahead of Republican George W. Bush with 93 votes (46.5% vs. 46.0%) and other candidates with 3 votes (1.5% vs. 0.8%), among the 200 ballots cast by the borough's 306 registered voters, for a turnout of 65.4% (vs. 78.8% in the whole county).

In the 2013 gubernatorial election, Republican Chris Christie received 63 votes (62.4% vs. 61.4% countywide), ahead of Democrat Barbara Buono with 35 votes (34.7% vs. 35.8%) and other candidates with 1 votes (1.0% vs. 1.2%), among the 101 ballots cast by the borough's 312 registered voters, yielding a 32.4% turnout (vs. 44.5% in the county). In the 2009 gubernatorial election, Republican Chris Christie received 62 votes (50.4% vs. 47.7% countywide), ahead of Democrat Jon Corzine with 47 votes (38.2% vs. 44.5%), Independent Chris Daggett with 3 votes (2.4% vs. 4.8%) and other candidates with 4 votes (3.3% vs. 1.2%), among the 123 ballots cast by the borough's 322 registered voters, yielding a 38.2% turnout (vs. 44.9% in the county).

United States Senate election results for Wrightstown1
Year	Republican		Democratic		Third party(ies)	
Year	No.	%	No.	%	No.	%
2024	96	44.65%	113	52.56%	6	2.79%
2018	64	41.83%	73	47.71%	16	10.46%
2012	68	34.87%	124	63.59%	3	1.54%
2006	55	50.46%	46	42.20%	8	7.34%

United States Senate election results for Wrightstown2
Year	Republican		Democratic		Third party(ies)	
Year	No.	%	No.	%	No.	%
2020	89	39.04%	134	58.77%	5	2.19%
2014	45	52.33%	38	44.19%	3	3.49%
2013	37	55.22%	30	44.78%	0	0.00%
2008	76	41.76%	104	57.14%	2	1.10%

== Education ==
Students in public school for grades pre-kindergarten through eighth grade attend the New Hanover Township School District, a consolidated public school district that serves students from both New Hanover Township and Wrightstown. As of the 2023–24 school year, the district, comprised of one school, had an enrollment of 197 students and 19.4 classroom teachers (on an FTE basis), for a student–teacher ratio of 10.2:1. In the 2016–17 school year, the district had the 40th-smallest enrollment of any school district in the state.

For ninth through twelfth grades, public school students from both New Hanover Township and Wrightstown attend Bordentown Regional High School as part of a sending/receiving relationship with the Bordentown Regional School District, a regional K-12 school district that serves students from Bordentown City, Bordentown Township and Fieldsboro Borough. As of the 2023–24 school year, the high school had an enrollment of 762 students and 55.5 classroom teachers (on an FTE basis), for a student–teacher ratio of 13.7:1.

Students from Wrightstown, and from all of Burlington County, are eligible to attend the Burlington County Institute of Technology, a countywide public school district that serves the vocational and technical education needs of students at the high school and post-secondary level at its campuses in Medford and Westampton.

== Economy and environmental protection ==
National concrete products supplier EP Henry operates a plant in Wrightstown. In 2019, it became the first customer for a reduced CO_{2} cement which reduces carbon emissions by 70%.

== Transportation ==
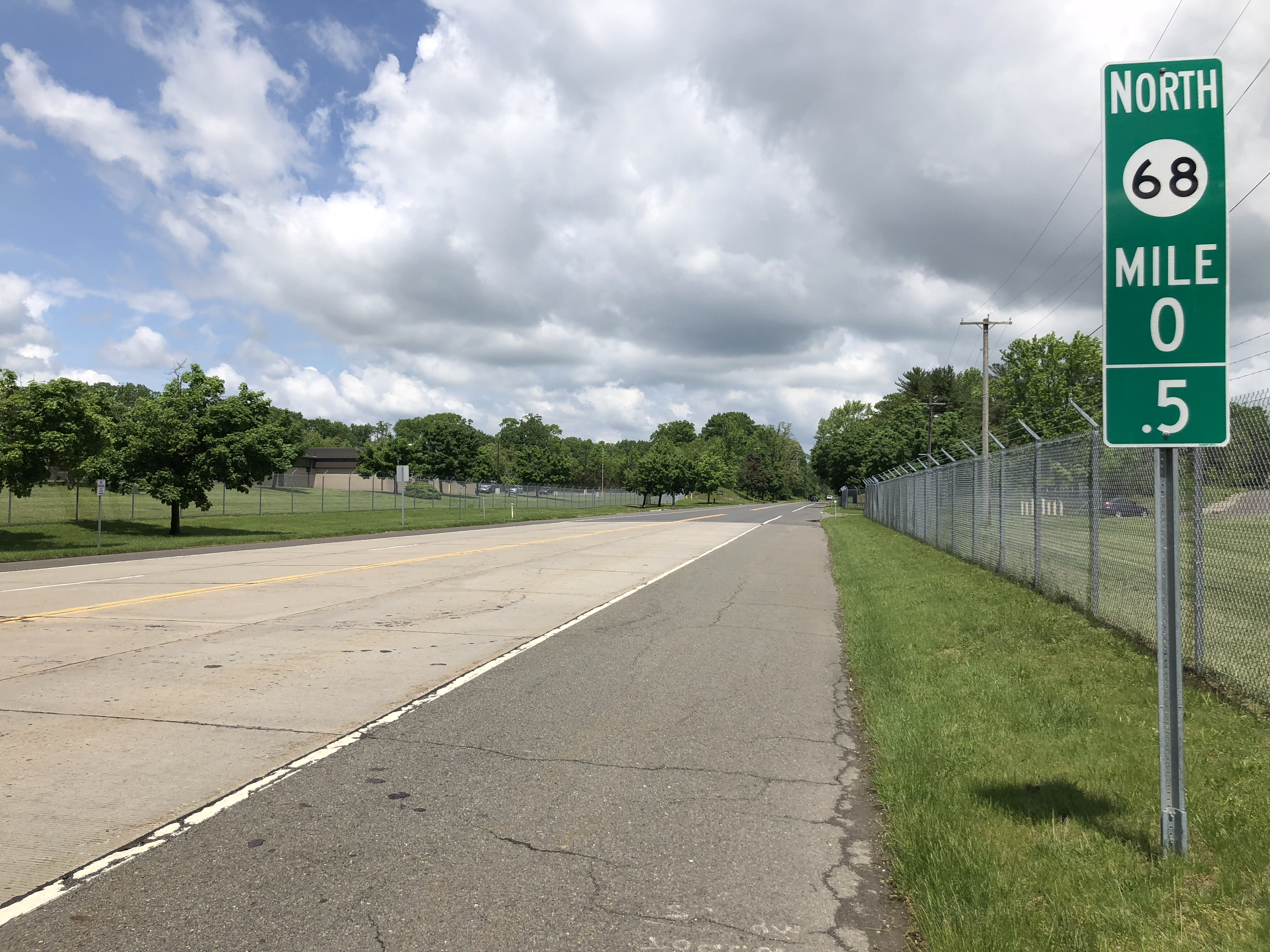
Route 68 in Wrightstown

=== Roads and highways ===
As of May 2010, the borough had a total of 4.35 miles (7.00 km) of roadways, of which 2.70 miles (4.35 km) were maintained by the municipality, 1.18 miles (1.90 km) by Burlington County and 0.47 miles (0.76 km) by the New Jersey Department of Transportation.

The most significant highway serving Wrightstown is New Jersey Route 68. County Route 545 also passes through the borough.

=== Public transportation ===
NJ Transit provides bus service in the borough on the 317 route between Asbury Park and Philadelphia.

== News coverage ==
Wrightstown and neighboring Cookstown were put in the national spotlight when six Islamic militants, dubbed "The Fort Dix Six", were arrested while trying to carry out an attack against Fort Dix on May 7, 2007. Heightened security around the bases affected the local economy based heavily in restaurants specializing in delivery to the base.

== Notable people ==
People who were born in, residents of, or otherwise closely associated with Wrightstown include:

- Daniel V. Asay (1847–1930), iceboat racer
- Samuel G. Wright (1781–1845), represented New Jersey's 2nd congressional district in 1845
