= Cookstown, New Jersey =

Place in Burlington County, New Jersey, United States

- Census-designated place
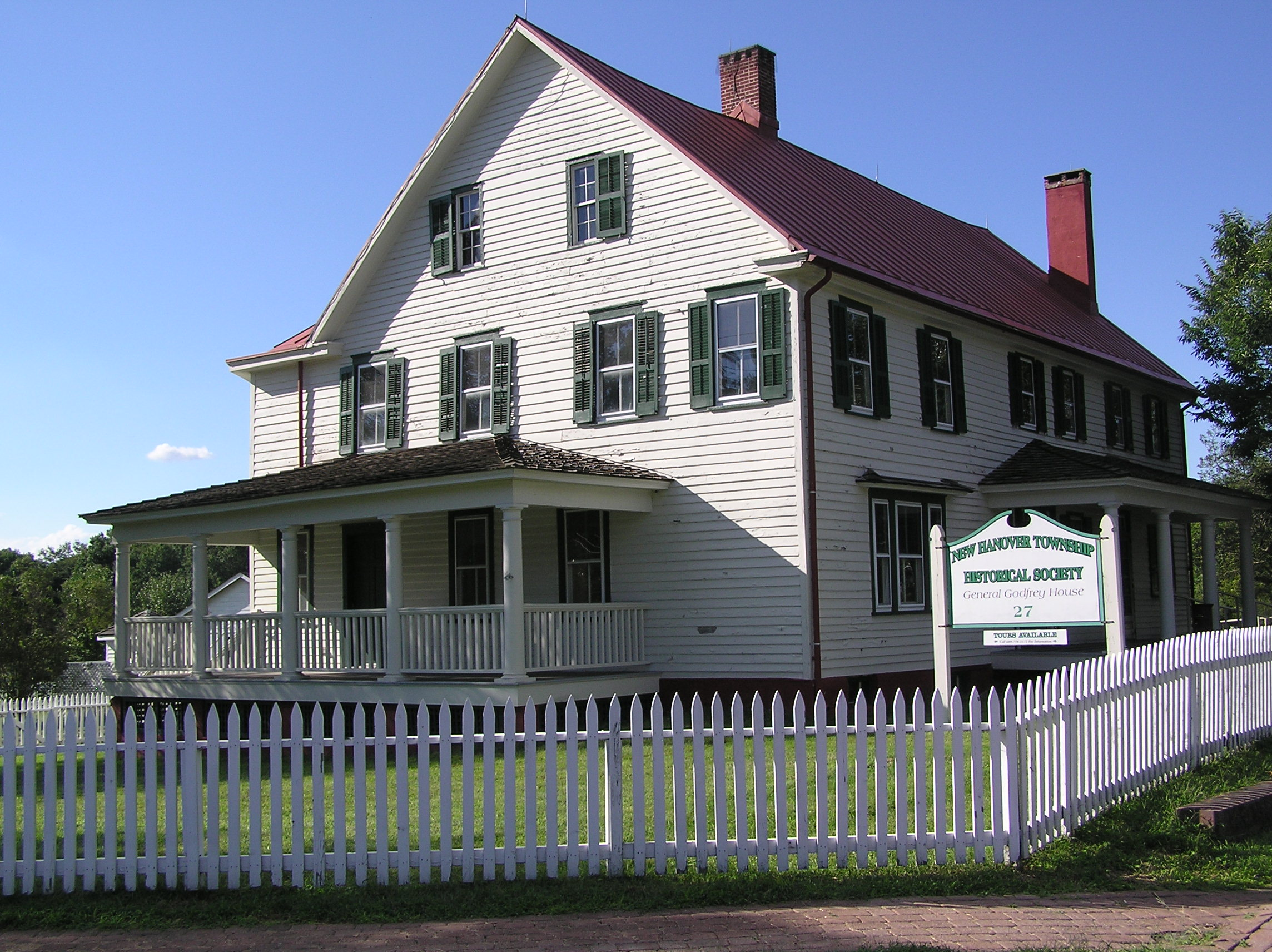
- Gen. Edward S. Godfrey House on Main Street in Cookstown

- Location in Burlington County Location in New Jersey Location in the United States
- Coordinates: 40°02′56″N 74°33′45″W
- Country: United States
- State: New Jersey
- County: Burlington
- Township: New Hanover

Area
  - Total: 2.52 sq mi (6.52 km^{2})
  - Land: 2.50 sq mi (6.47 km^{2})
  - Water: 0.019 sq mi (0.05 km^{2})
- Elevation: 82 ft (25 m)

Population (2020)
  - Total: 900
  - Density: 360.3/sq mi (139.13/km^{2})
- Time zone: UTC−05:00 (Eastern (EST))
  - Summer (DST): UTC−04:00 (EDT)
- FIPS code: 34-14980
- GNIS feature ID: 875620

Cookstown is an unincorporated community and census-designated place (CDP) located within New Hanover Township in Burlington County, in the U.S. state of New Jersey. Located near Fort Dix, the area is served as United States Postal Service ZIP Code 08511.

As of the 2020 census, Cookstown had a population of 900.

== Demographics ==
Historical population
Census	Pop.	Note	%±
2020	900		—
U.S. Decennial Census; 2000

Cookstown first appeared as a census designated place in the 2020 U.S. census.

Cookstown CDP, New Jersey – Racial and ethnic composition Note: the US Census treats Hispanic/Latino as an ethnic category. This table excludes Latinos from the racial categories and assigns them to a separate category. Hispanics/Latinos may be of any race.
Race / Ethnicity (NH = Non-Hispanic)	Pop 2020	2020
White alone (NH)	675	75.00%
Black or African American alone (NH)	37	4.11%
Native American or Alaska Native alone (NH)	3	0.33%
Asian alone (NH)	23	2.56%
Native Hawaiian or Pacific Islander alone (NH)	1	0.11%
Other race alone (NH)	3	0.33%
Mixed race or Multiracial (NH)	56	6.22%
Hispanic or Latino (any race)	102	11.33%
Total	900	100.00%

== Education ==
Most of the CDP is in the New Hanover Township School District (PK-12), while a small portion is in the North Hanover Township School District (PK-6, elementary school) and the Northern Burlington Regional School District (7–12, secondary), and the U.S. Census Bureau lists another part as being in "Joint Base McGuire-Dix-Lakehurst" as its school district.

Students in the area listed as "Joint Base McGuire-Dix-Lakehurst" attend area school district public schools, as the Department of Defense Education Activity (DoDEA) does not operate any schools on that base. Students on McGuire and Dix may attend one of the following for their respective grade levels, with all siblings in a family taking the same choice: North Hanover Township School District (elementary), Northern Burlington County Regional School District (secondary), and Pemberton Township School District (PK-12).

== Notable people ==
People who were born in, residents of, or otherwise closely associated with Cookstown include:

- Edward Settle Godfrey (1843–1932), United States Army Brigadier General who received the Medal of Honor for leadership as a captain during the Indian Wars.
