= Elm Ridge Cemetery, North Brunswick =

Historic cemetery in Middlesex County, New Jersey

Elm Ridge Cemetery
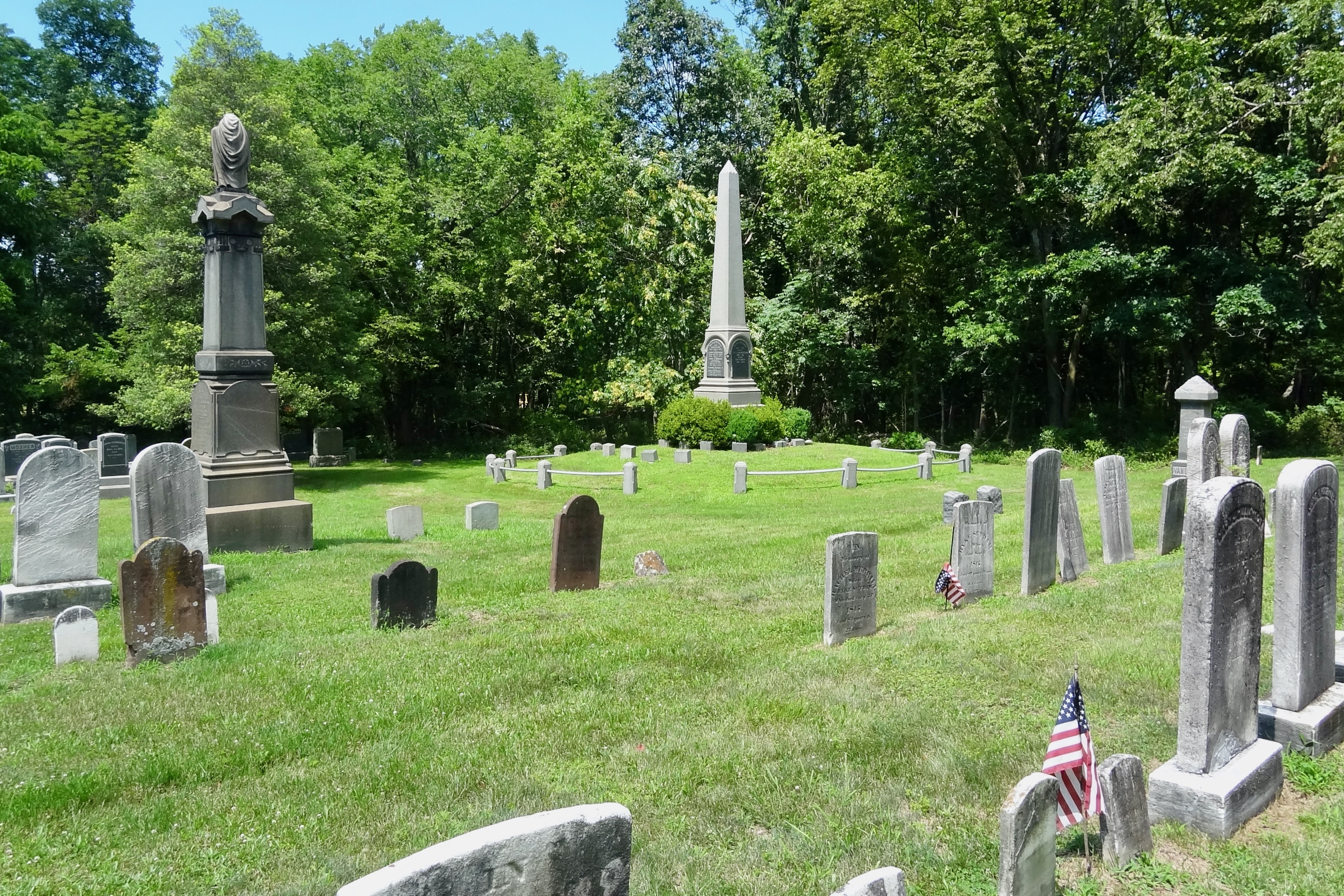

Details
- Established: 1868 (incorporation)
- Location: North Brunswick, New Jersey
- Country: United States
- Coordinates: 40.4539°N 74.5153°W
- Size: approximately 5 acres (2.0 ha)

Elm Ridge Cemetery is on Route 27 in North Brunswick, New Jersey. It is a historic cemetery of both the Colonial period (18th-century) and the Victorian period (19th-century). Although located in Middlesex County, the majority of the burials are from Somerset County, which directly borders the cemetery.

== History ==
Prior to 1868, the cemetery was an informal burial ground on the farm of John Van Cleef. It was near where Six Mile Run, a small stream, crossed historic King's Highway (now Route 27) in the historic community of Six Mile Run. The cemetery was associated with the Church at Six Mile Run, which was located there from 1710 to 1766 when it moved to its present location approximately one mile south. (Note: Some sources confuse the ancient cemetery with an ancient Three Mile Run cemetery located several miles north at 40.47664°N 74.48729°W The Church at Three Mile Run, of the same congregation, was located there prior to the establishment of the Three Mile Run cemetery.)

The Elm Ridge Cemetery Company was formed in 1868 by an act of the State of New Jersey authorizing the company to purchase an adjoining 5-acre (2.0 ha) tract, to improve and operate the cemetery, sell burial plots, and be exempt from taxation as long as the land was used as a cemetery. The act named the initial seven members of corporation that would manage the cemetery, specified that all future members must be owners of burial plots within the cemetery, and that a new board would be elected annually by vote proportional to the number of plots owned. The act also specified that family gravesites in the old cemetery could continue to be used for burial by the respective families.

A conservation assessment was performed in 2005. A conservation project was completed in 2006 to address deterioration of the grave markers. Markers were reset, repaired, and cleaned by Cultural Heritage Research Services, a historic preservation services company.

== Frelinghuysen Monument ==
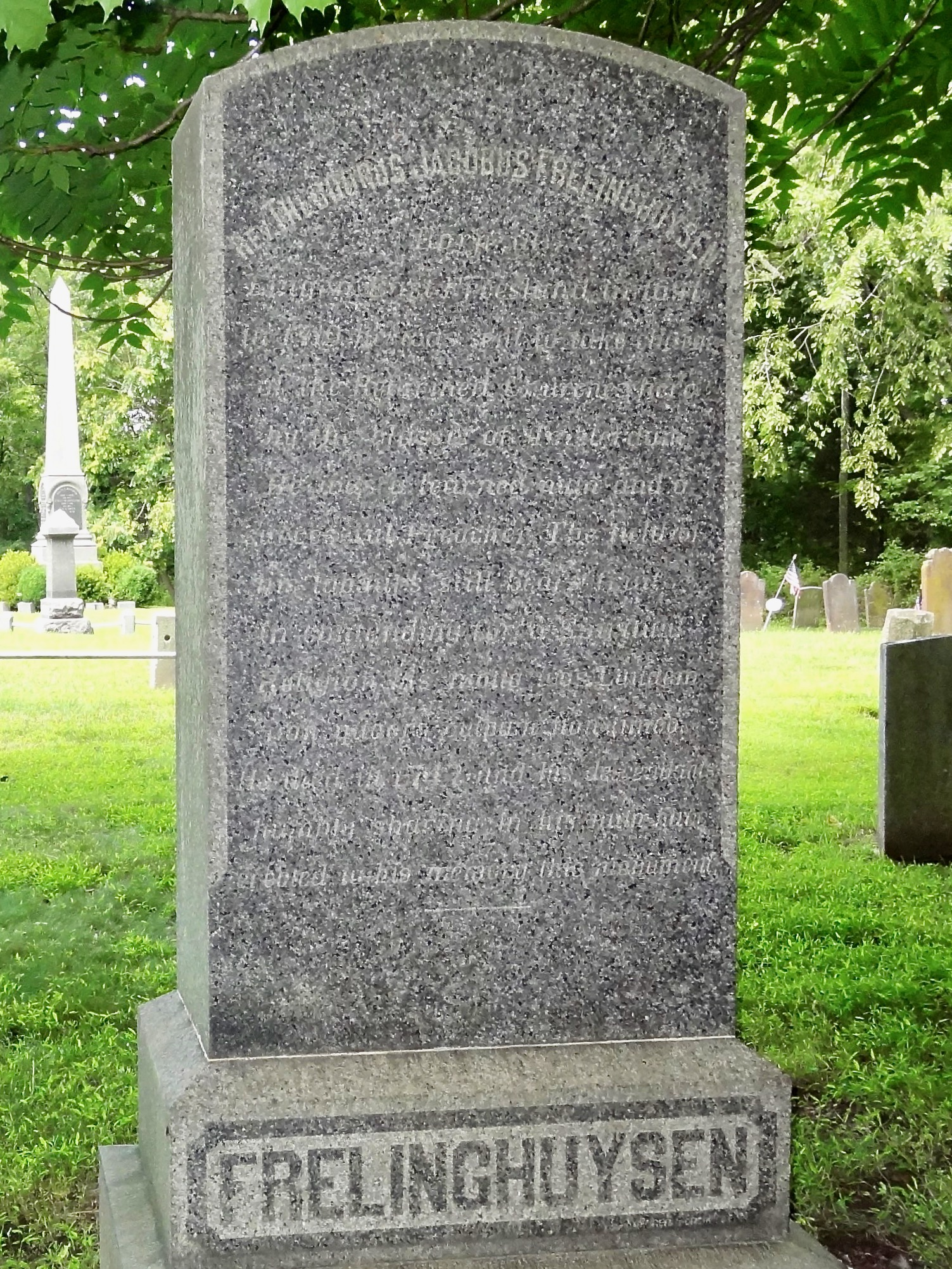
Monument of Frelinghuysen

Theodorus Jacobus Frelinghuysen (c. 1691 – c. 1747) was a Dutch-Reformed minister and theologian who immigrated in 1720 to the Raritan River valley of New Jersey to lead the congregations at Raritan, New Brunswick, Six-Mile Run, Three-Mile Run, North Branch and Harlingen. Upon his death, he was buried at the Six Mile Run cemetery without a tombstone. When in 1884 his descendants decided to place a stone on his grave, they could not determine where his body was interred. They erected a cenotaph with the following inscription:

Rev. Theodorus Jacobus Frelinghuysen. Born at Lingen, East Freesland in 1691. In 1719, he was sent to take charge of the Reformed Churches here by the Classis of Amsterdam. He was a learned man and a successful preacher. The field of his labor still bears fruit. In contending for a Spiritual Religion his motto was, "Laudem non quaero, culpam non timeo." He died in 1747, and his descendants, humbly sharing in his faith, have erected to his memory this monument.

== Notable burials ==
- Simon Addis (1745–1834), Captain in Revolutionary War. A new grave marker was placed by the Daughters of the American Revolution in 1932.
- Peter Pumyea II (1739–1802), Captain in Revolutionary War.
- Theodorus Jacobus Frelinghuysen (1691–1748), immigrant from Netherlands and theologian.
- Gustavus Gunther (1844–1922), Corporal in the American Civil War.
- Henry A. Lewis (1826–1900), Sergeant in the American Civil War.
- Jan Van Dyke and his wife, Annetje Verkirk Van Buren, great-grandparents of Rachel Van Dyke, subject of the To Read My Heart: The Journal of Rachel Van Dyke, 1810–1811.
- Bruce H. Williams (1932-2019), Radio Talk Show Host, Author, Member of the National Radio Hall of Fame
