= Dreahook, New Jersey =

Populated place in Hunterdon County, New Jersey, US

- Unincorporated community
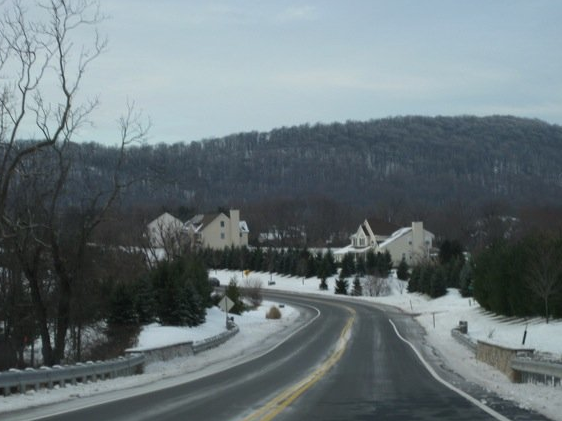

- Location of Dreahook in Hunterdon County Inset: Location of county within the state of New Jersey Dreahook, New Jersey (New Jersey) Dreahook, New Jersey (the United States)
- Coordinates: 40°36′00″N 74°46′53″W
- Country: United States
- State: New Jersey
- County: Hunterdon
- Township: Readington
- Elevation: 230 ft (70 m)
- GNIS feature ID: 875970

Dreahook is an unincorporated community in Readington Township in Hunterdon County, in the U.S. state of New Jersey at the intersection of CR-620/Dreahook Rd and CR 523. The name is a corruption of Driehoek (drie-three and hoek-corner, as in corners of a triangle), which is the Dutch word for triangle. It was likely named for the triangle created by the settlement in its relation to the early roads to Flemington, Whitehouse Station, Readington Village and Pleasant Run, which have since been rerouted. Dreahook Creek and Holland Brook both pass through the area of the former village. Dreahook village once had blacksmith shop, a school and a store. Settlers farmed the land here because of the rich soil along the base of Cushetunk Mountain. There are still numerous farms in the area, including the Readington River Buffalo Farm between Dreahook and Stanton.
