= N51 =

N51 may refer to:

== Roads ==
- N51 road (Ireland)
- N51 road (Luxembourg)
- Santiago–Tuguegarao Road, in the Philippines
- Nebraska Highway 51, in the United States

== Other uses ==
- N51 (Long Island bus)
- Solberg–Hunterdon Airport, in Readington Township, New Jersey, United States
