= Readington Village, New Jersey =

Populated place in Hunterdon County, New Jersey, US

- Unincorporated community
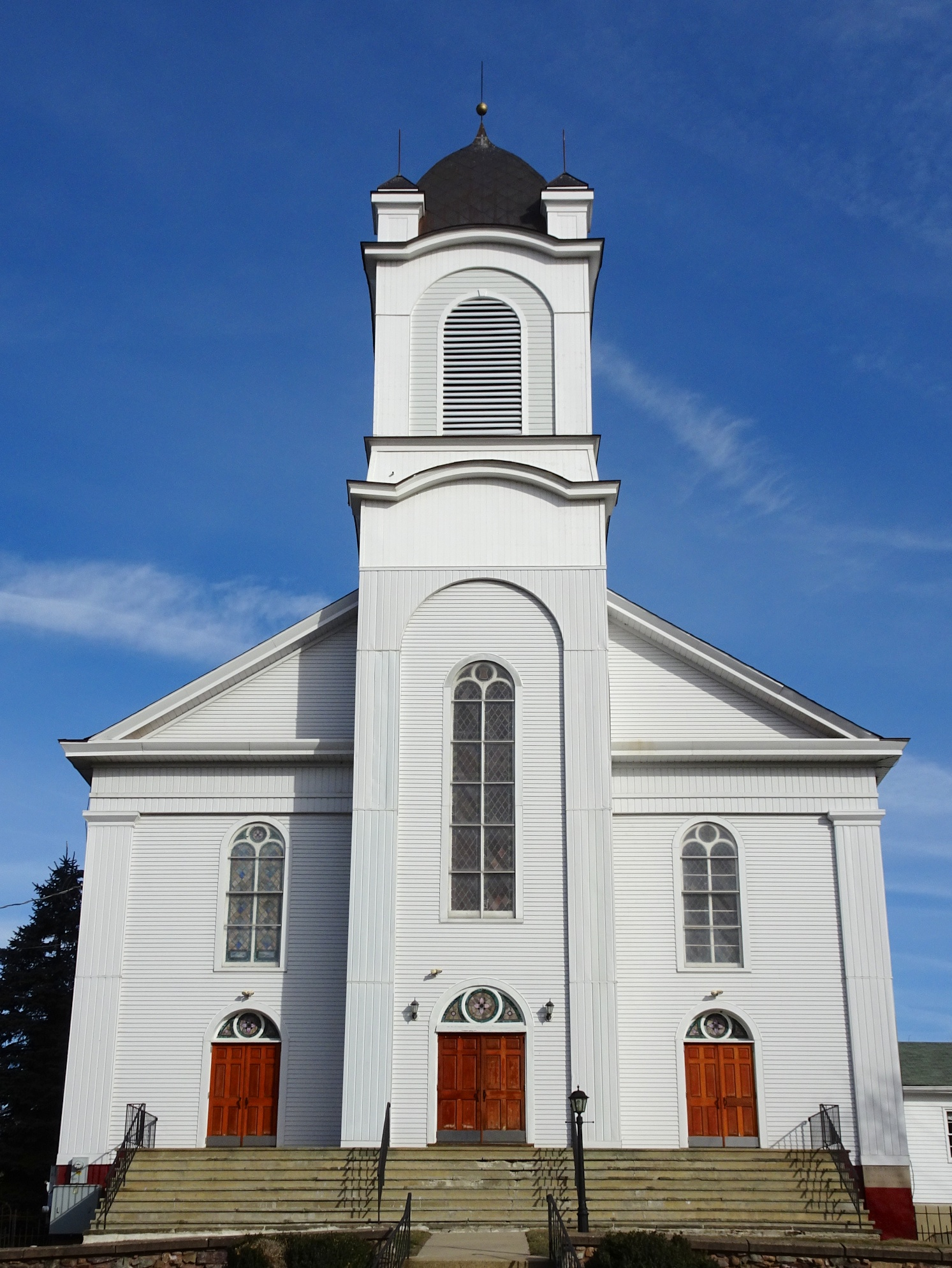
- Readington Reformed Church

- Location within Hunterdon County, New Jersey Location within New Jersey Location within the United States
- Coordinates: 40°34′07″N 74°44′16″W
- Country: United States
- State: New Jersey
- Region: Central Jersey
- County: Hunterdon
- Settled: 1710

Area
  - Total: 0.13 sq mi (0.33 km^{2})
- Time zone: UTC−05:00 (Eastern)
  - Summer (DST): UTC−04:00 (Eastern)
- GNIS feature ID: 879627

Readington Village is an unincorporated community located within Readington Township in Hunterdon County, in the U.S. state of New Jersey, that is centered on the converging of Readington Road, Hillcrest Road, Centerville Road and Brookview Road. It is located on Holland Brook, originally named Amanmechunk, which means large creek in the Unami dialect. The area was inhabited by the Raritan prior to the arrival of European settlers. The Native Americans who lived near Readington Village travelled to the coast during the summer for fish and clams. Such a trip is mentioned in an Indian deed transferring lands around Holland Brook to George Willocks, an East and West New Jersey Proprietor. The deed mentions two of the natives, who lived at Readington: Metamisco and Wataminian.

== History ==
Readington was first settled by Europeans in the early 18th century by people of Dutch descent, including Emanuel Van Etta, from Esopus, New York, and Adrian Lane, a settler who erected a mill on Holland Brook. Nearby Van Etta Road is named for Emanuel Van Etta, whose surname means "from Etten". In 1738, the Dutch Reformed Church of North Branch was moved west to Readington Village because of the growing population. The third building on this site, pictured left, stands there today. A parsonage was built on the north side of the brook on the hill, still in Readington Township. The nearby Parsonage Hill Road in Branchburg is named for this site.

The church location before the parish was moved to Readington was three miles east. This structure was a log building just north and west of the convergence of the North and South branches of the Raritan River formerly called Tucca-ramma-hacking by the Raritan, which meant the "flowing together of waters". The church's pastor, Theodorus Jacobus Frelinghuysen later helped to form a seminary at the Old Dutch Parsonage in Somerville. This eventually became Queen's College, now known as Rutgers University. Rutgers during the American Revolutionary War held classes at the old church at the convergence. During the 19th century, Readington Village had a church, a mill, a store, a school and a tavern. One of the former school buildings is a garage between the bottom of Hillcrest and Centerville Roads on Brookview Road. A later former school building can be seen just west of there and is now being used as a barn.

The mill in Readington Village continued to run until about 1920 and was still standing until 1935. A general store in the community continued to function until the 1990s. The store was eventually sold and later became a post office.

The only non-residential buildings in Readington Village today are the small post office, a volunteer fire house (also used as a polling station) and the Readington Reformed Church. The post office is on property owned by the Little Shell Band of Chippewa Indians. The community has seen extensive flooding of Holland Brook a few times in recent years (including during Hurricane Floyd) that has closed the Hillcrest Bridge and damaged nearby houses.

Just northwest of Readington is Solberg Airport, the site of the New Jersey Balloon Festival. This annual festival began in 1983 and its hundred-plus balloons draw over a hundred thousand people. It is the largest annual event in New Jersey and the largest balloon festival in North America during the summer.

== Historic district ==
- Readington Village Historic District
- U.S. National Register of Historic Places
- U.S. Historic district
- New Jersey Register of Historic Places
- Location: Readington, Hillcrest, Centerville and Brookview roads
- Area: 73 acres (30 ha)
- Architect: Asa Dilts
- Architectural style: Colonial, Greek Revival, Vernacular Dutch Colonial
- NRHP reference No.: 91000827
- NJRHP No.: 1622

Significant dates
- Added to NRHP: June 24, 1991
- Designated NJRHP: May 10, 1991

The Readington Village Historic District is a 73-acre (30 ha) national historic district located along Readington, Hillcrest, Centerville and Brookview roads in the village. It was added to the National Register of Historic Places on June 24, 1991 for its significance in architecture, exploration/settlement and community planning and development. The district includes 43 contributing buildings and 2 contributing sites.

== Gallery ==
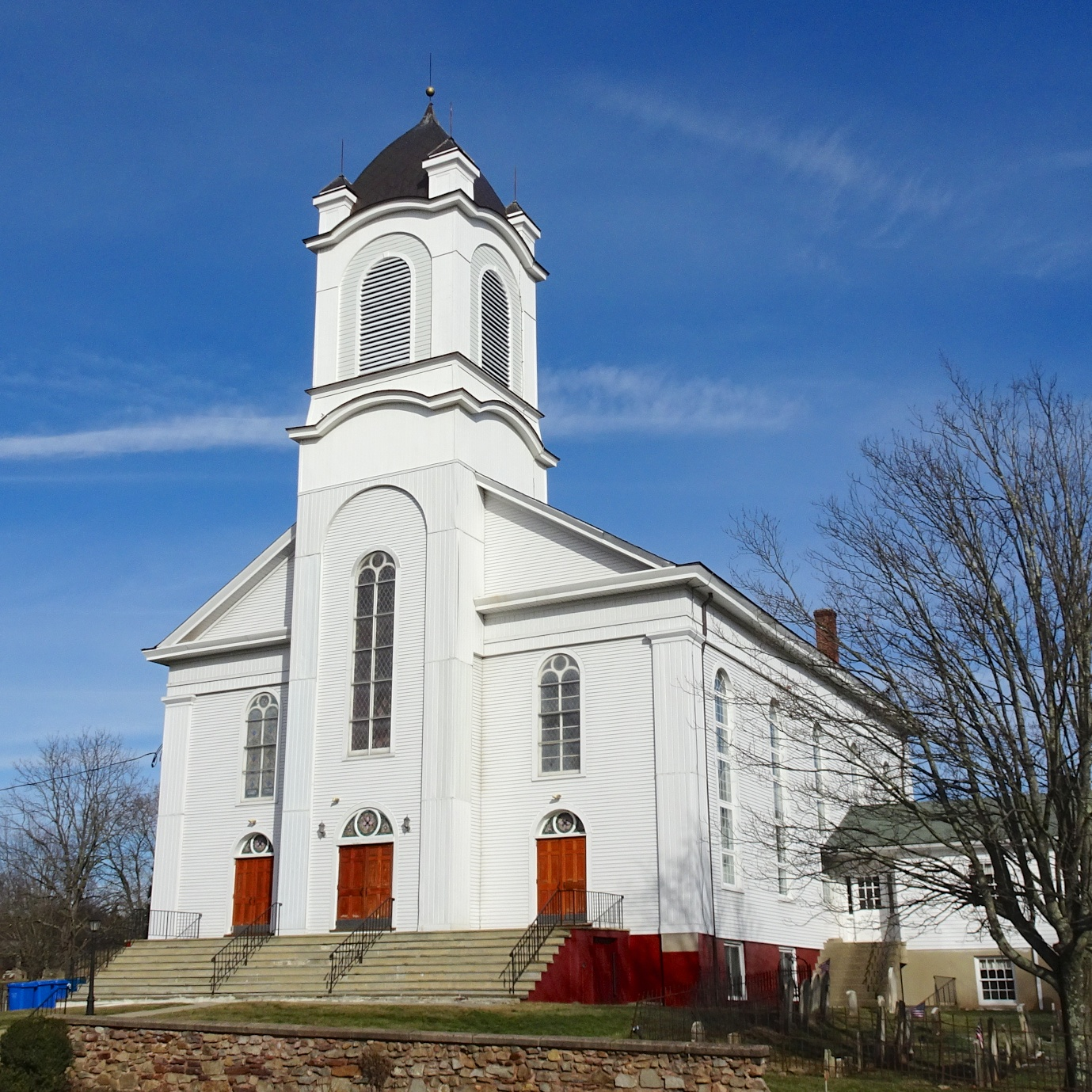
Readington Reformed Church

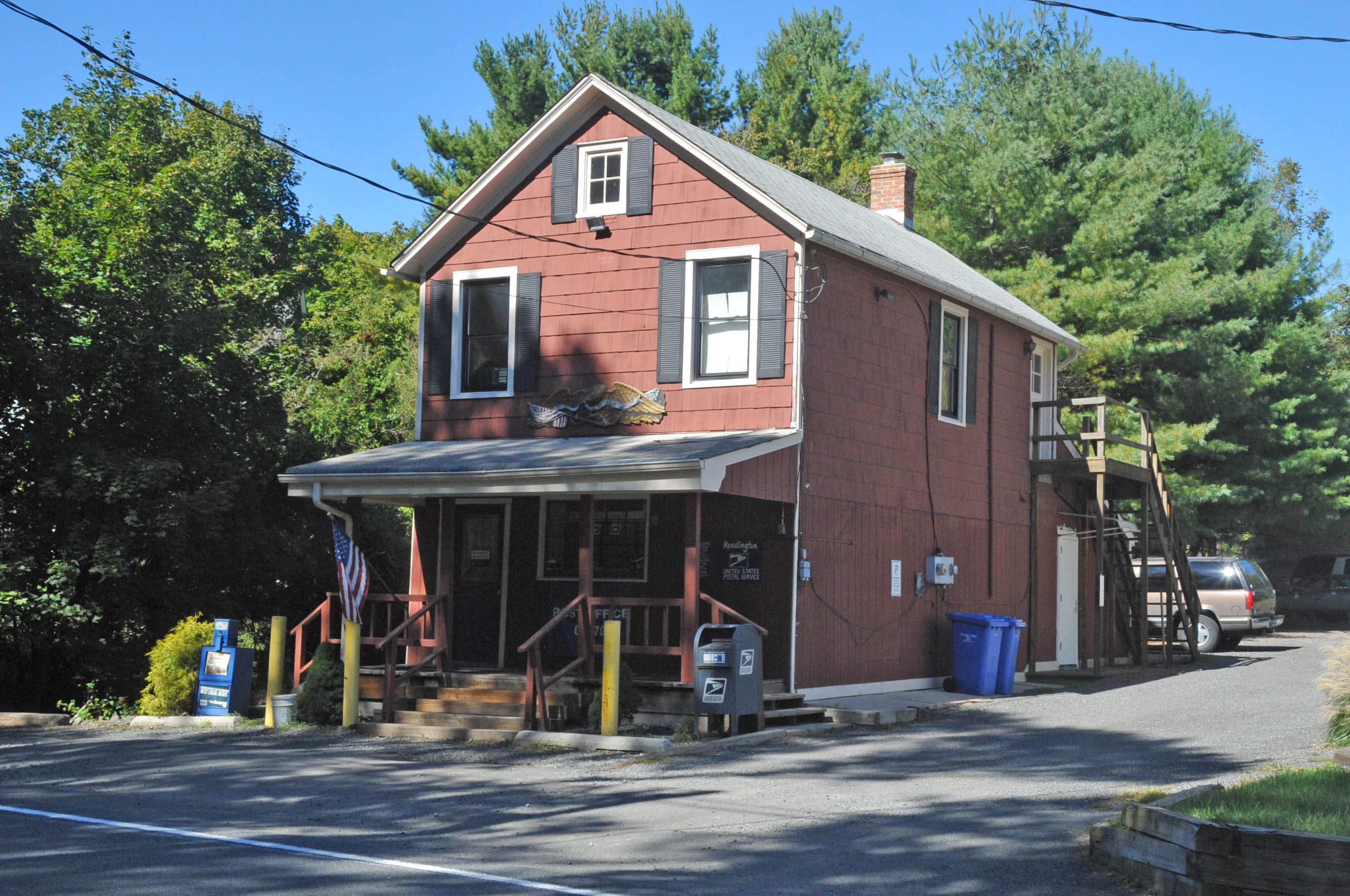
Village store from the 1830s

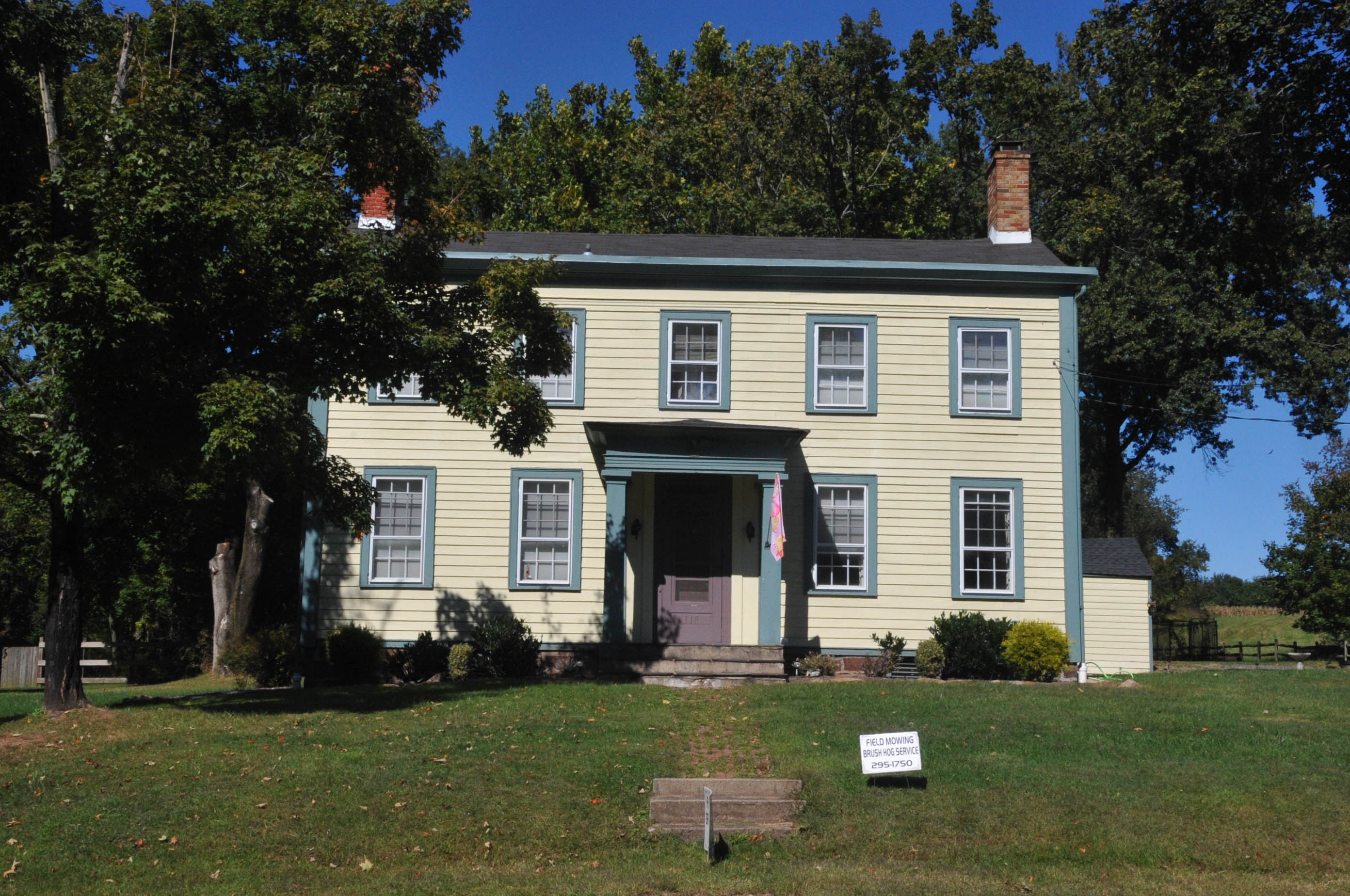
Aaron Berger house

== See also ==
- National Register of Historic Places listings in Hunterdon County, New Jersey
