= Dreahook Creek =

River in Hunterdon County, New Jersey, United States

Coordinates: 40°36′01″N 74°47′16″W

Dreahook Creek is a left tributary of Holland Brook in Readington, New Jersey. It begins on township owned land near Creek Road and Dreahook Road. It merges with another small tributary (East Dreahook Creek) on the east side of County Route 620 before entering the Holland Brook. It was named after the former Dutch village of Dreahook (Drea-Hook). The name is a corruption of Driehoek (drie- three and hoek- angle), which is the Dutch word for triangle. It was likely named for the triangle created by the settlement in its relation to the early roads to Flemington, Whitehouse Station, Readington Village and Pleasant Run, which have since been rerouted.

== Crossings ==
=== Dreahook Creek ===
- Dreahook Road
- Horseshoe Road
- CR 523/Main Street

=== East Dreahook Creek ===
- CR 620/Dreahook Road East

== See also ==
- List of rivers of New Jersey
