= Raritan River Greenway =

Coordinates: 40°33′47″N 74°38′06″W

The Raritan River Greenway is a proposed path in Somerset County, New Jersey that would link Branchburg Township to the East Coast Greenway with the Delaware and Raritan Canal trail in South Bound Brook. Raritan River Greenway is a priority park for Somerset County.

== Completed sections ==
The longest completed section of the Raritan River Greenway is three miles (5 km) long and runs from a hill near Red Oak Way in Bridgewater to Nevius Street in Raritan. The hill at an elevation of seventy feet has a nice view of south side of the Raritan River. The dirt path from the top of the hill to a small parking lot (at the driveway for the Sellars Maintenance Facility on Old York Road) is part of county property that is undeveloped. Through the fence of the parking lot is the developed part of the trail, beginning as a gravel pathway bound by the Raritan Water Power Canal and the Raritan River. This part of the trail is in Duke Island Park in Bridgewater. Less than a quarter mile east, a paved bicycle path begins, which ends near an old railroad bridge near Woodmere Street. The gravel and dirt footpath continues along the canal and meets up with the bicycle path again near the old railroad bridge. The dirt pedestrian path continues on the much narrower strip of land between the canal and river until it reaches a small foot bridge at the end of Canal Street in Raritan. A new pedestrian bridge further west on Old York Road has been installed with parking provided for further access to the greenway. After reaching Raritan center, the greenway continues across a mowed field without a trail and under a tunnel beneath the Lyman Street Bridge. On the south side of the Lyman Street Bridge is a small sign with some history of the Raritan Power Canal. The Nevius Street Bridge, where the trail currently ends can be crossed by pedestrians and bicyclists into Hillsborough.

== Future sections ==
With plans underway for the redevelopment of the Somerville landfill site on US 206 and the rehabilitation of an old Raritan Woolen Mills into apartments, the section from Nevius Street to US 206 would likely be the next section to be planned. This section would need a small bridge over the canal and a bridge over US 206. It would pass along the opposite bank from the Duke Farms estate and go over the old private railroad tracks of the Duke family. A third section connecting US 206 to the Delaware and Raritan Canal trail would be about three and a half miles long and would require five bridges over water, including two long bridges and two bridges over train tracks. The west route from Bridgewater to the Branchburg Trail would be less than half a mile.

== See also ==
- Raritan River Project
- Delaware and Raritan Canal State Park
- Holland Brook Greenway
