= Johannes Arondeus =

American pastor (c.1710–1796)

- Born: c.1710 Overschie near Rotterdam, Holland
- Died: c.1796 (aged 85–86); Morris County, New Jersey, United States
- Occupations: pastor, Dutch Church
- Known for: Dutch Reformed Church in America

Domine Johannes Arondeus (c.1710 – c.1796) was one of the earliest pastors in American history who was sent to the Middle Colonies during the height of the First Great Awakening by the Dutch Church in Holland. The purpose of the Great Awakening was Evangelism and it adopted the evangelical style of preaching that held conservative theological views believing in the Bible as the word of God.

Evangelists in the United States according to Wheaton College's Institute for the Study of American Evangelicals in 2016, make up 30-35% of the American population. In 2023 a Gallup reported that 33% of the population identified themselves as Evangelical/Protestant. Evangelicalism has become a significant force in American politics.

== Early life and work ==
Arondeus was born in Overschie near Rotterdam between 1700 and 1710 and died in Morris County, New Jersey. The date of his will was September 28, 1796.

He was ordained in Amsterdam on September 9, 1741, and was invited by the Dutch Reformed Church on Long Island, Queens County, New York, where he was to take the place of Reverend Bernhardus Freeman, who had died in 1741. On July 11, 1741, he was called by the Deputies of the Classis in Kings County, New York. He accepted the call on July 17, 1741, and had set sail for America in 1741 but was captured by pirates.

He returned to Holland on January 9, 1742, and requested the Classis of Amsterdam that he be released from his call to Long Island because of the ill health of his wife.

Rev. Arondeus served in the Dutch Reformed Church from 1742 to 1747 at Brooklyn, Bushwick, Gravesend, Flatbush, Flatlands and New Utrecht Reformed Church, all on Long Island, and from 1747 to 1754 at Raritan (Somerset), Harlingen (Somerset), Somerville (Somerset), Readington Reformed Church, Six Mile Run (Somerset) at Franklin and The Three Mile Run, all in New Jersey.

In 1754 he went back to Holland and was thought to have died in 1754. However he married, second, Christina Praa Provoost, widow of David Jonathan Provoost on April 20, 1769, in New York. His will was dated September 28, 1796, in Morris County, New Jersey. Administrators were Jonathan Provoost of New York City and David Provoost of Morris County, New Jersey.

Johannes Arondeus adhered to the Dutch Reformed Church in Holland.

The Dutch Reformed Church was based on The Union of Utrecht in 1579. Article 13 specifically states “each person shall remain free, especially in his religion, and that no one shall be persecuted or investigated because of their religion."

More about Arondeus can be read in the Ecclesiastical Records, State of New York volumes 4–6. Vol 4, p. 2804 includes record of his support by the members of the congregation:

"We have now got our new Domine; but with a true Christian joy, which continues and constantly increases, because of his great zeal and soul stirring sermons. We can and must give this testimony to his Reverence, that he altogether verifies the certificates of the Rev. Classis of Amsterdam. He edifies by his teachings and by his life. He is zealous and painstaking in his service, in preaching, in catechizing and in everything, pertaining to the duties of a faithful servant of Christ. Therefore we, the undersigned elders and deputies of our congregations, and in their name and by their order, humbly request your Reverences to select again for our congregations a minister, such as we need, and who will prove serviceable, and qualify him according to the rules of the church, and bend him over to us to do service for us as our lawful pastor".

As a result of the changing times, a schism developed within the Dutch Reformed Churches in America. Ulpianus van Sinderen, Theodorus Jacobus Frelinghuysen, John Henry Goetchius represented the pietist fraction. Johannes Arondeus represented the orthodox and they became fervent enemies. Arondeus arrived in America amid the turmoil within the church. Frelinghuysen was having problems within his own congregation in the Raritan Valley as they became increasingly annoyed with him.

The division within the church also affected non-religious people. Problems within the Raritan Valley were heard about not only in America and Amsterdam, but also around the world. Letters were written to the governing bodies of the churches regarding the behavior of Goetchius. One letter writes of him discrediting Arondeus at the door of the Dutch Reformed Church at Oyster Bay, Long Island.

The Coetus wanted to be more independent of the 'Classis' or the Dutch Reformed Church. Heated arguments and accusations arose between the pastors in the two fractions and were recorded. As documents later became more accessible, it was possible to discover that many accusations were false. For example, 'Reverend Johannes Arondeus claims to be a pastor but cannot prove his ecclesiastical attestation'.

In a letter written from New York to the Classis in Amsterdam on December 2, 1772, Arondeus writes what had happened to him after he left the church in America and went to Denmark where he could preach and earn a living there. He explains how he had been the subject of slander and that Ulpianus van Sinderen, known as The Rebel Parson, preached from the pulpit to his congregation the following about he, Arondeus: 'in the old countries I had hanged myself and had then been buried at a crossroad".

There was no basis for any of the rumors as is proven in the support Arondeus received from both churches in Holland and America as seen in the correspondence recorded in the Ecclesiastical Records of New York. It shows the bitter rivalry between the Classis of Amsterdam and the Coetus in the church in the Middle colonies during the Great Awakening.
