= Thor Solberg =

Norwegian aviator (1893 – 1967)

- Born: March 28, 1893; Florø, Sogn og Fjordane, Norway
- Died: February 26, 1967 (aged 73); Branchburg, New Jersey, United States
- Burial place: churchyard in Florø, Norway
- Occupation: aviation pioneer
- Known for: first successful flight from the United States of America to Norway
- Notable work: founded Solberg-Hunterdon Airport in New Jersey
- Awards: Knight of the Order of St. Olav

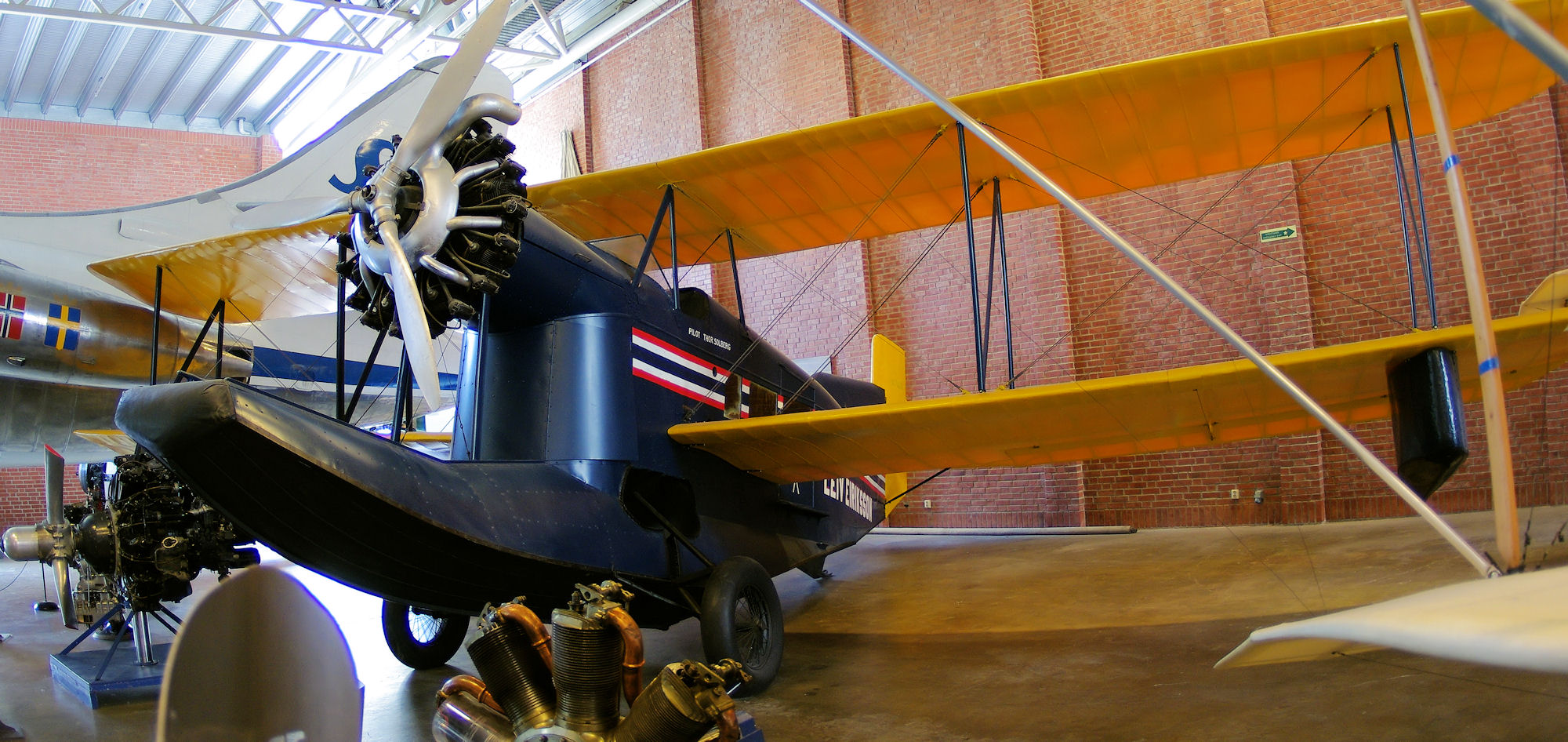
Loening C-2-C Air Yacht used by Thor Solberg and Paul Oscanyan. (Norwegian Museum of Science and Technology)

Thor Solberg (March 28, 1893 – February 26, 1967) was a Norwegian-born aviation pioneer who made the first successful flight from the United States of America to Norway in 1935. He made the journey, which started in New York City, in an open-cockpit single-engine aircraft with no landing instruments. For this reason, he was restricted to an altitude of 1,000 to 10,000 feet (300 to 3,050 m). Solberg also founded the Solberg-Hunterdon Airport in New Jersey.

== Early life ==
Thor Simonsen Solberg was born on his family's farm (Solberg på Årebrot) at Florø in Sogn og Fjordane, Norway. He had ten brothers and sisters, including Halfdan and Lars Solberg. Solberg was interested in motors and aviation from an early age and was a "daring" motorcyclist in his youth. He was also interested in artistic picture framing in his youth. Solberg participated in a number of motorcycling speed events during his early years. He also rode from Oslo to Paris in 48 hours in 1923.

== Early flying career ==
Solberg received his pilot's training in Germany in the years following World War I. He took a pilot's license in 1919 and became one of Norway's aviation pioneers.

Solberg, inspired by aviators such as Charles Lindbergh, was to be the first person to fly from Norway to the United States solo, receiving some aid and advice from Roald Amundsen.

Solberg lived in the United States from 1925 or 1928. Upon arriving in the United States, Solberg worked at various jobs, such as proprietor of an art studio and picture framing store in Brooklyn, while planning his flight. Solberg flew over much of the United States in his Bellanca CH-200 Pacemaker while preparing for the flight.

== Flight to Norway ==
In preparation for his flight to Norway, Solberg practiced blind flying, studied his route, and created his own maps of it. He received financial and technical support from two of his brothers, Bernt Balchen, and several other people.

After managing to convince the Enna Jettick Shoe Company to fund his flight, Solberg made his first attempt to fly from the United States to Norway with Carl Petersen in a Bellanca K, named Enna Jettick, (formerly Roma from a failed US to Italy flight), on August 23, 1932, but that attempt failed. They encountered fog and snow near Newfoundland and were forced to make a crash landing. Shortly afterwards, they were rescued by nearby fishing boats.

On July 18, 1935, Solberg made a second attempt with a different plane, an amphibious single-engine Loening C-2-C Air Yacht that he named Liev Eiriksson. On this flight, Paul C. Oscanyan, who had worked for Eastern Airlines, joined the flight as radio operator. They departed from Floyd-Bennett Field and made four stops at locations between the United States and Norway before landing in Norway on 16 August 1935 after passing through Labrador, Greenland, Iceland, the Faroe Islands, and Bergen. Solberg's course roughly followed the path that Leif Erikson's voyage took. Upon his arrival in Norway, the King of Norway gave Solberg a gold medal.

== Later flying career ==
In 1939, Solberg founded the Solberg-Hunterdon Airport in central New Jersey. In 1941, he received permission from the Readington Township Committee to operate a commercial airport. The airport was also used as a training facility during World War II where Solberg trained approximately 5,000 aviators. Solberg Airport was also used to train pilots for Pan American World Airways.

== Personal life, death, and legacy ==
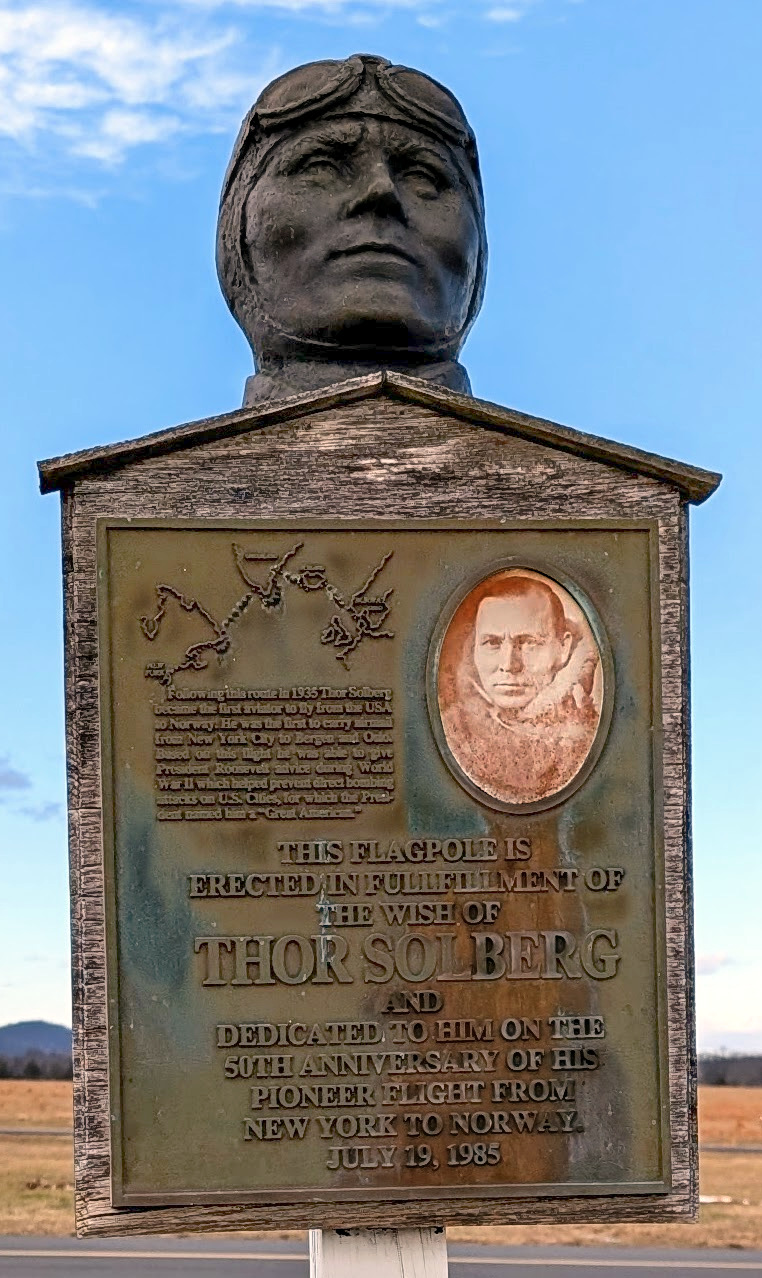
A plaque located at the Thor Solberg Airport in Readington, New Jersey

Solberg was a Knight of the Order of St. Olav. He was also a notable member of the Norsemen Lodge, an organization which was composed of people of Norwegian birth or descent. Additionally, he was a life member of the Explorers' Club in New York.

Solberg died in Branchburg, New Jersey at the age of 73 and was buried at the churchyard in Florø.

== Legacy ==
- The Loening C-2-C Air Yacht piloted by Thor Solberg in 1935 is presently on display at the Norwegian Museum of Science and Technology in Oslo, Norway.
- A statue of Solberg was erected at the Florø Airport in 1985 to commemorate the 50th anniversary of his flight.

== See also ==
- Solberg–Hunterdon Airport
- List of aviation pioneers
