= New Utrecht Reformed Church =

Church in Brooklyn, New York

- New Utrecht Reformed Church and Buildings
- U.S. National Register of Historic Places
- New York State Register of Historic Places
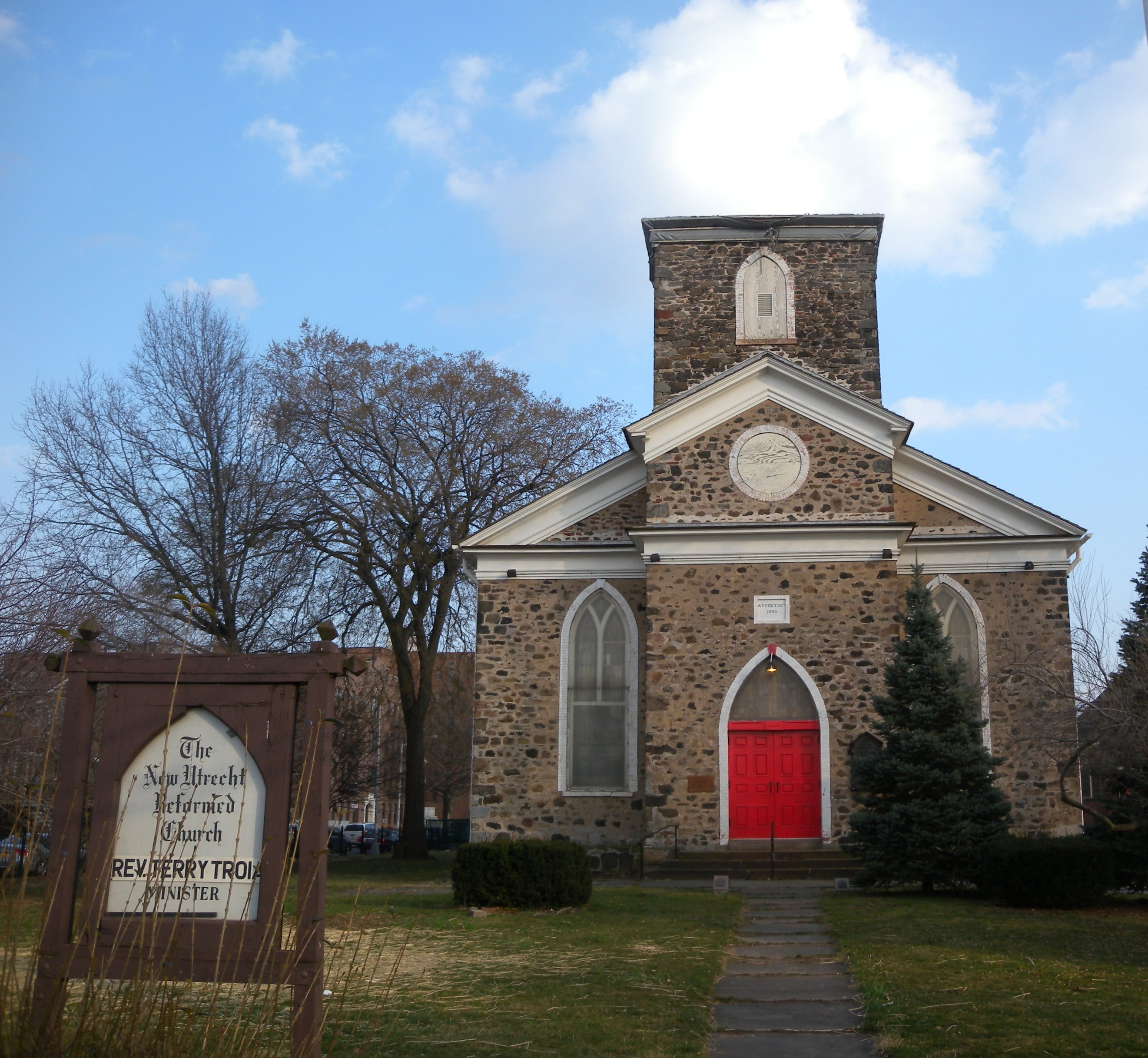

- Location within New York City Location within New York Location within the United States
- Location: 18th Avenue between 83rd and 84th Streets, Brooklyn, New York
- Coordinates: 40°36′30″N 74°0′3″W
- Area: less than one acre
- Built: 1828
- Architects: Valk, Lawrence; Et al.
- Architectural style: Shingle Style, Georgian, Richardsonian Romanesque
- NRHP reference No.: 80002634
- NYSRHP No.: 04701.000162

Significant dates
- Added to NRHP: April 9, 1980
- Designated NYSRHP: June 23, 1980
- New Utrecht Reformed Church Complex (Boundary Increase)
- U.S. National Register of Historic Places
- New York State Register of Historic Places
- New York City Landmark
- Location: 18th Avenue between 83rd and 84th Streets, Brooklyn, New York
- Area: less than one acre
- Built: 1653
- NRHP reference No.: 01000126
- NYSRHP No.: 04701.014829, 04701.014830, 04701.014791
- NYCL No.: 0172E

Significant dates
- Added to NRHP: March 5, 2001
- Designated NYSRHP: July 13, 2000
- Designated NYCL: March 15, 1966; January 13, 1998 (extension)

New Utrecht Reformed Church is the fourth oldest Reformed Church in America congregation and is located in Bensonhurst, Brooklyn, New York. The church was established in 1677 by ethnic Dutch residents in the town of New Utrecht, Brooklyn, several years after the English took over New Netherland. It is affiliated with the Reformed Church in America, a Protestant denomination. The cemetery was consecrated in 1654; 1300 dead are interred there. The Liberty Pole, the sixth on the site of the present church, was originally erected in 1783 at the end of the Revolutionary War to harass departing British troops.

The present church was built in 1828 of stones taken from the original church, built in 1700. Construction was supervised by US Army engineer, Rene Edward De Russy, who led the construction of Fort Hamilton at New York harbor. The parish house was built in 1892 and the parsonage in 1906.

The church was designated as a National Historic Landmark in 1966; the parish house and the cemetery received landmark status in 1998. Both the church and the cemetery are listed in the National Register of Historic Places.

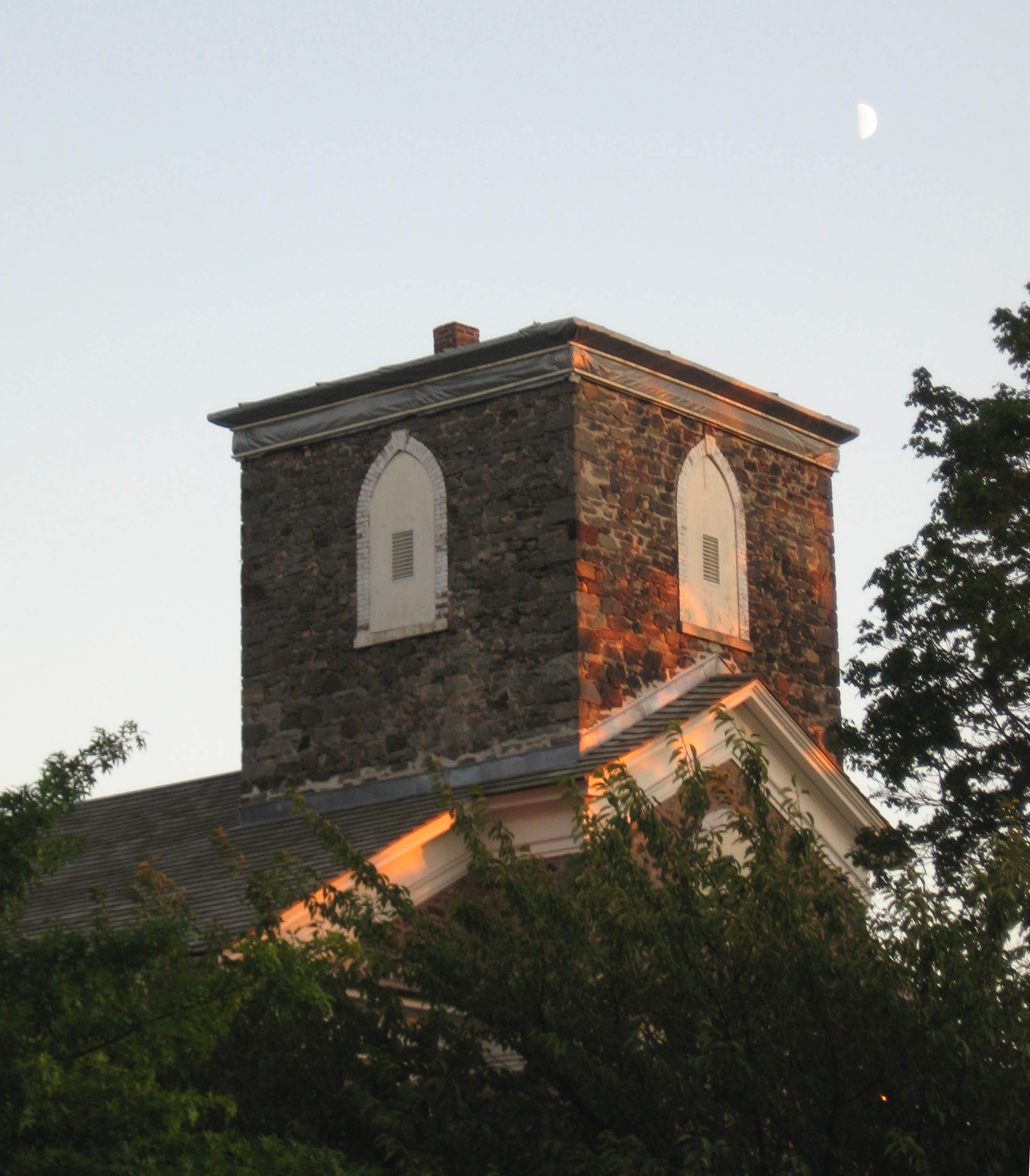
Steeple

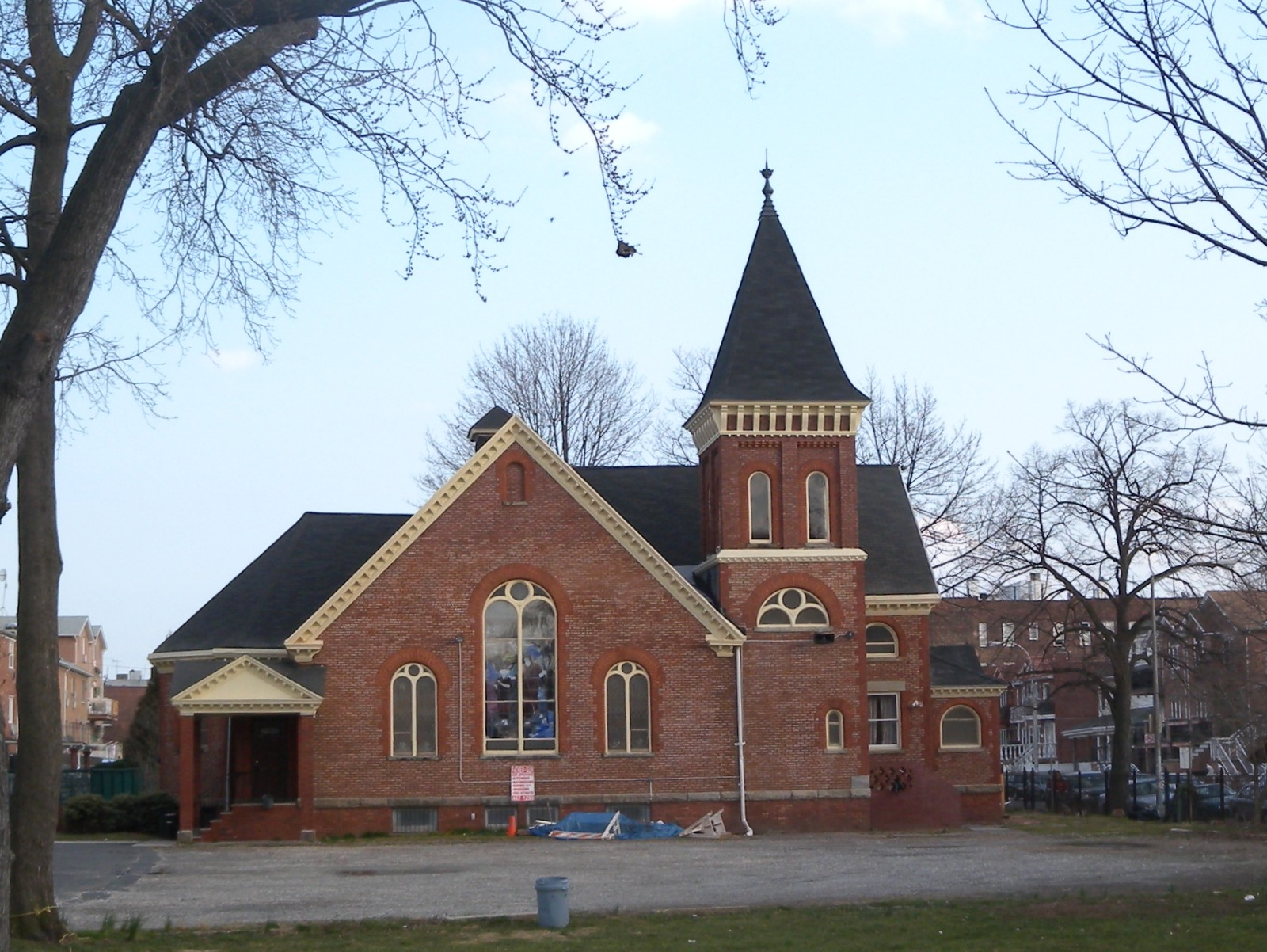
Parish House

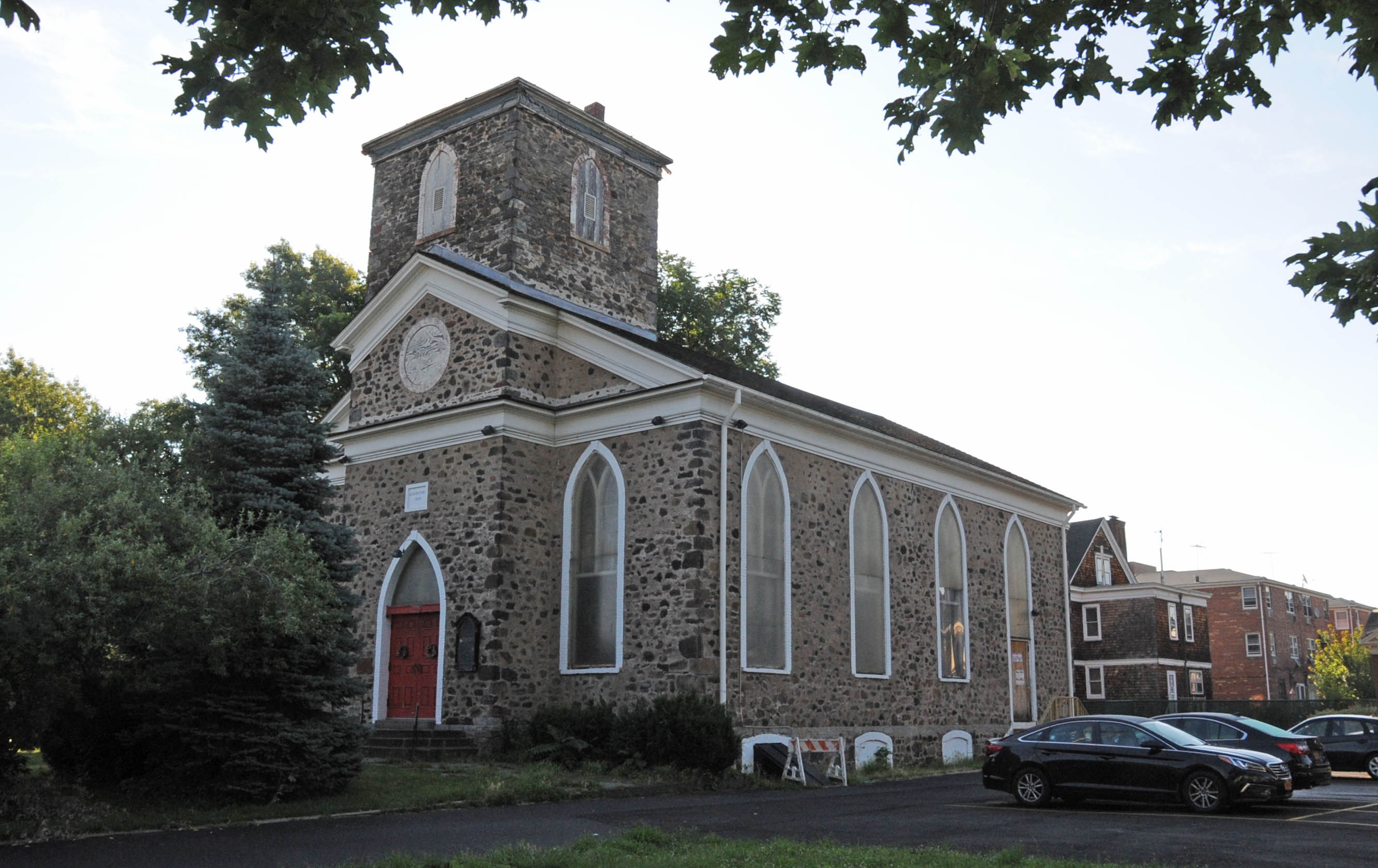
Church

== See also ==
- List of New York City Landmarks
- National Register of Historic Places listings in Kings County, New York
- Reverend Johannes Arondeus
