= Duke Island Park =

Park in New Jersey, United States

Coordinates: 40.55236°N 74.66949°W

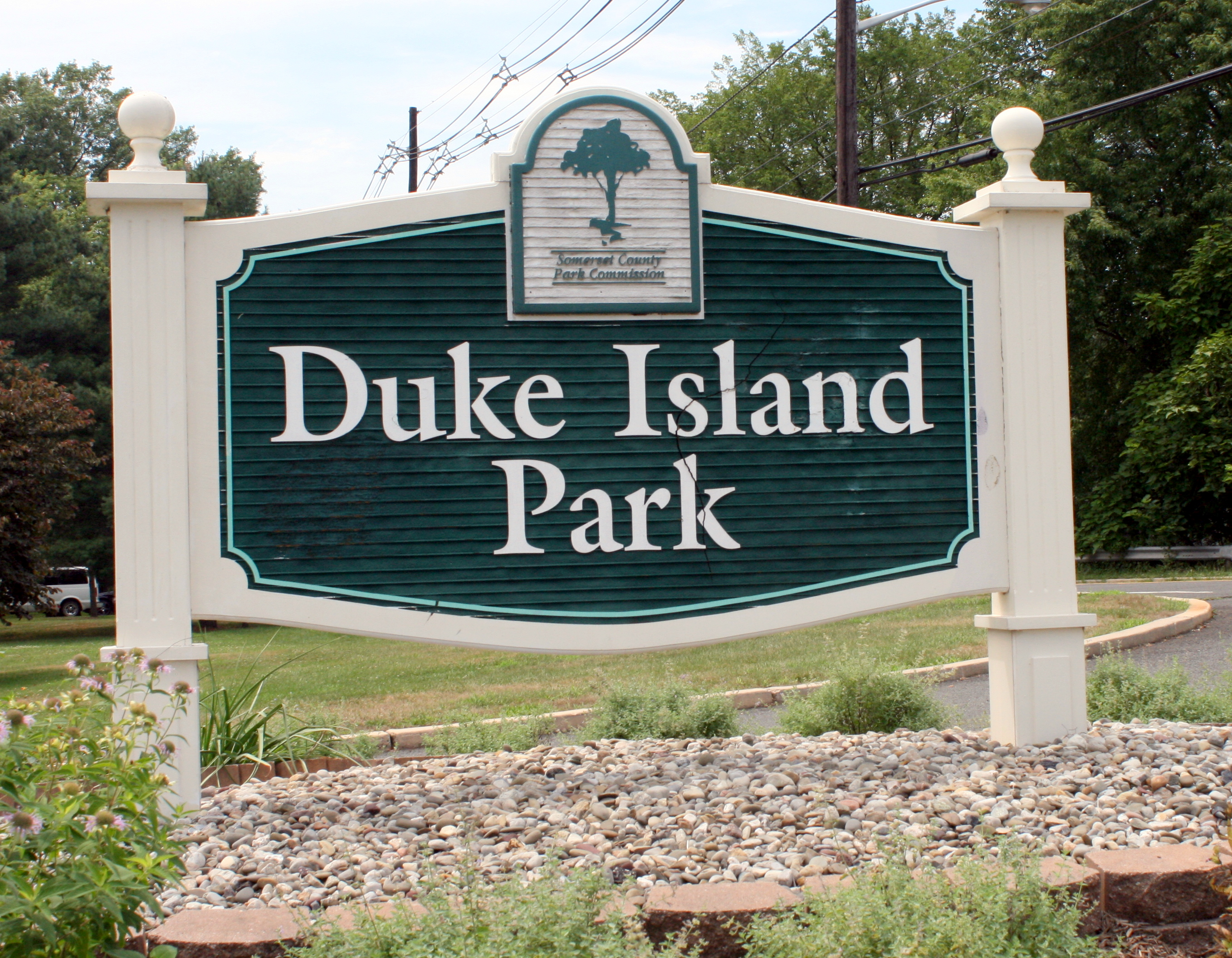
Duke Island Park

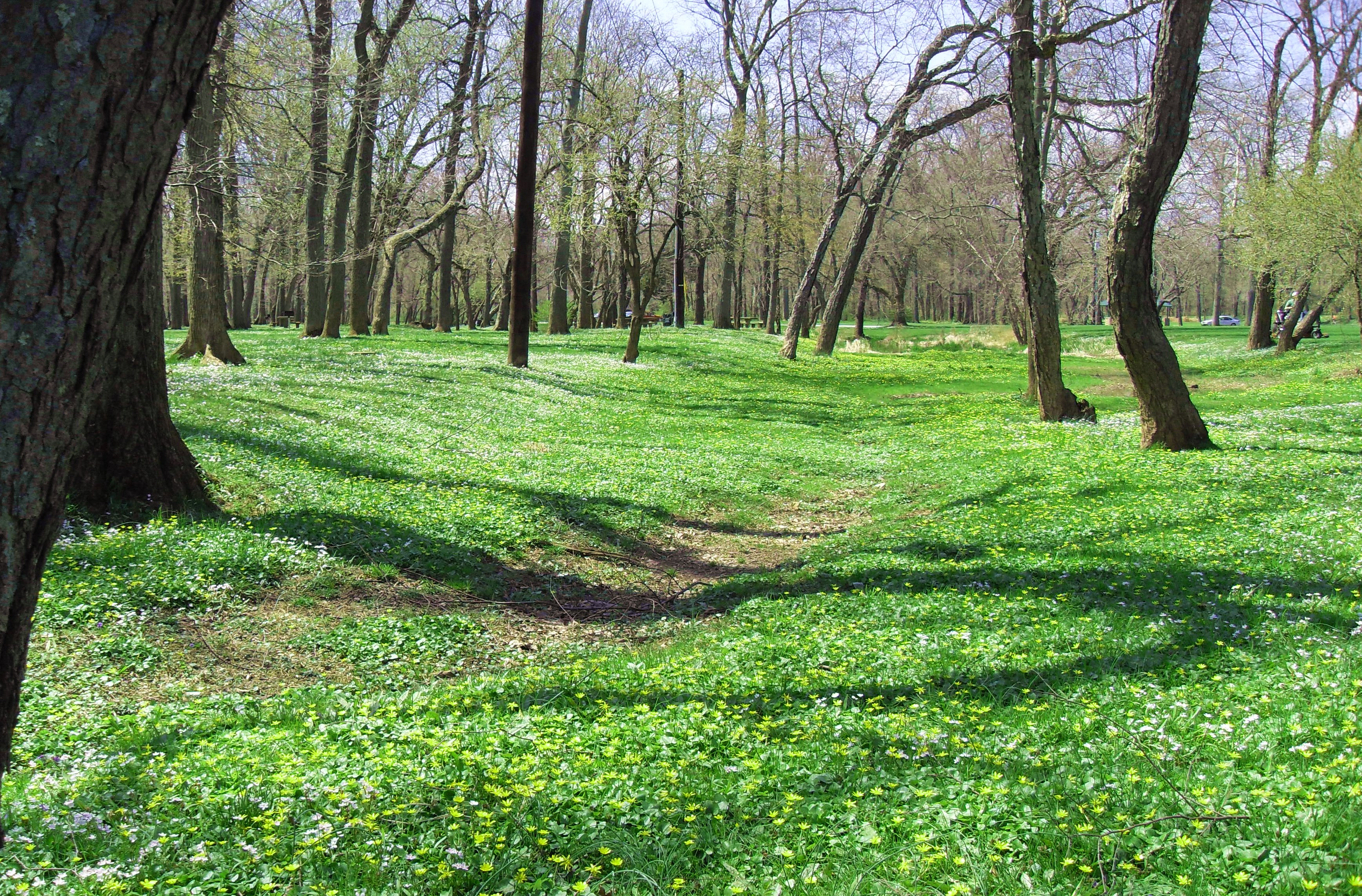
Spring in Duke Island Park showing Lesser Celandine invasion (2009)

Duke Island Park is a Somerset County Park in Bridgewater Township, New Jersey. The park includes trails, which are part of the Raritan River Greenway and currently connects the southwestern corner of Bridgewater with Raritan center and Hillsborough Township. The park covers 339 acres (137 ha) and is bounded by the Raritan River to the south and by the Raritan Water Power Canal on the other three sides. The park is home to numerous trail, several sports fields, and a bandstand that has free summer concerts. The visitors center is home to the Park Ranger's office, restroom facilities, vending machines and maps and brochures of county facilities.
