= Readington Reformed Church =

Historic church in New Jersey, United States

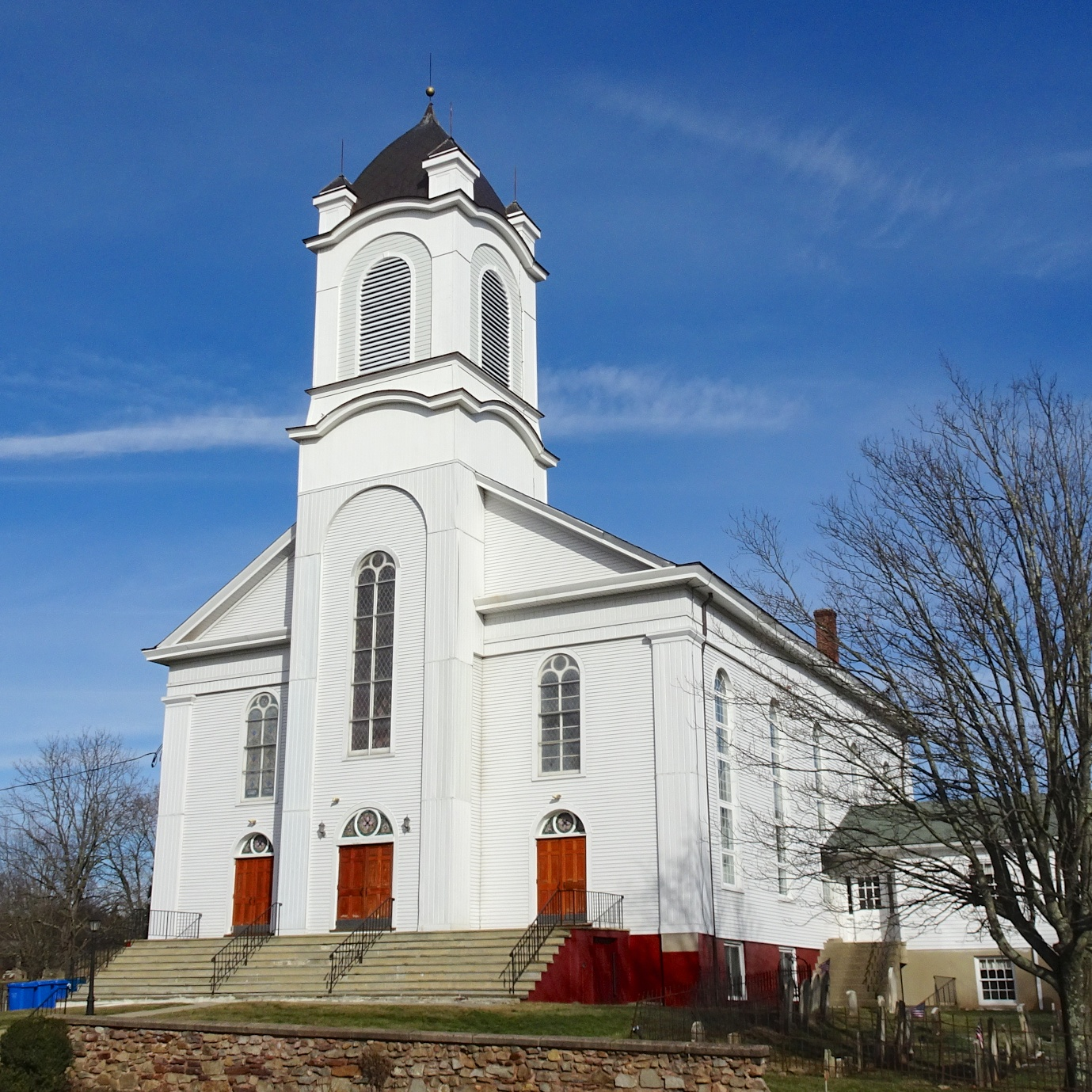

- Location within Hunterdon County, New Jersey
- 40°34′5″N 74°44′7″W
- Location: 124 Readington Road; Readington, New Jersey
- Denomination: Reformed Church in America
- Website: www.readingtonreformed.org

History
- Founded: 1719
- Readington Reformed Church
- U.S. Historic district – Contributing property
- Part of: Readington Village Historic District (ID91000827)
- Designated CP: June 24, 1991

The Readington Reformed Church is a historic church located at 124 Readington Road, Readington Village, an unincorporated community located within Readington Township in Hunterdon County, New Jersey. It was known in colonial times as the Dutch Reformed Church of North Branch. It is the oldest Dutch Reformed Church in the county. The current building was built in 1865. The churchyard is known as the Readington Reformed Church Cemetery. The church was added as a contributing property of the Readington Village Historic District by the National Register of Historic Places on June 24, 1991.

== History ==
The first church was organized in 1719 by a local congregation of the Dutch Reformed Church. They constructed a log church located near the confluence of the North Branch and South Branch into the Raritan River, about three miles east of Readington, in what is now Branchburg in neighboring Somerset County. On February 21, 1720, Reverend Theodorus Jacobus Frelinghuysen preached the first sermon there.

In 1738, the congregation left its original site and built its second church, a new frame building in Readington.

Frelinghuysen was pastor until 1748 and was succeeded by his son, Reverend John Frelinghuysen.

The Reverend Johannes Arondeus served as Conferentie, the pastor of the Classis ( orthodox ) Church of Amsterdam, at Readington Reformed Church from 1747 to 1754.

The Reverend Jacob Rutsen Hardenbergh, later the first President of Queens College (now Rutgers University), was ordained in 1757 and served the congregation for twenty five years.

The Reverend Peter Studdiford served from 1787 until 1826. In 1825, the congregation was large enough to form a new church at North Branch village.

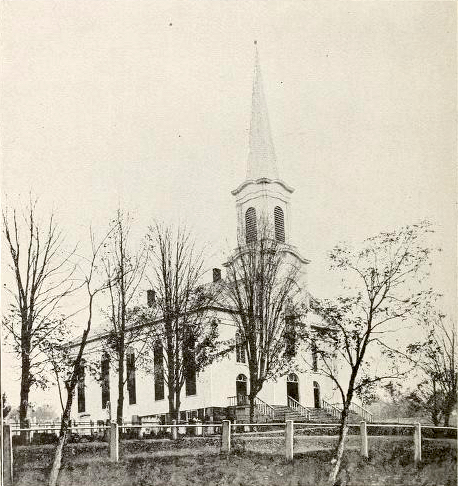
Readington Reformed Church in 1894

Two church buildings were constructed during the pastorate of Reverend John Van Liew, who served over forty years, from 1828 until his death in 1869. The first was a new church dedicated on December 22, 1833, which burned down on March 22, 1864. The second was the construction of the current building, dedicated on July 20, 1865.

The tall church steeple was blown over by a cyclone on January 3, 1913 and replaced by shorter version. After a restoration project one hundred years later, a new steeple was dedicated on October 27, 2013.

Readington Reformed Church Cemetery
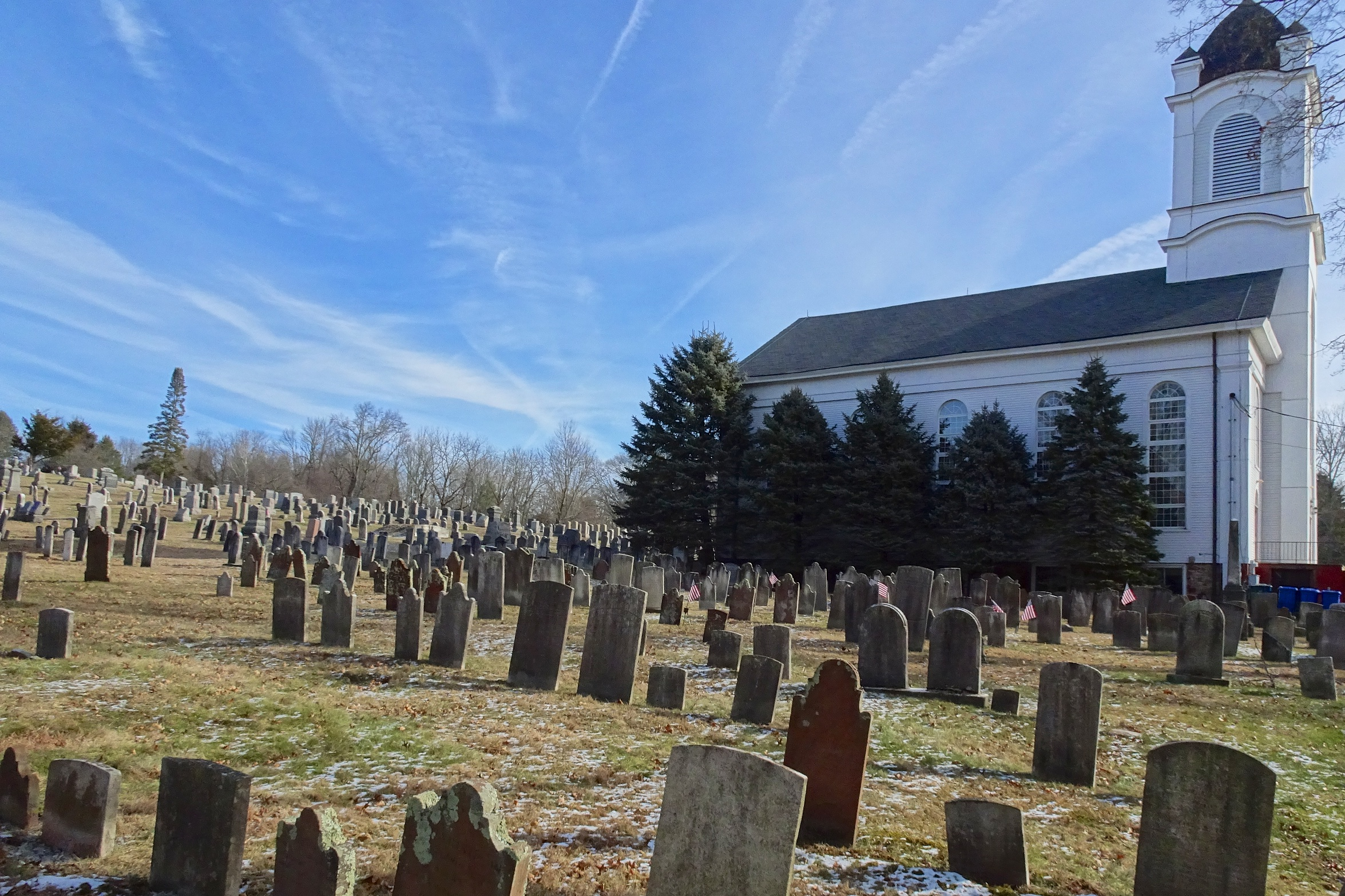
- Interactive map of Readington Reformed Church Cemetery

== Notable burials ==
- Peter Studdiford (1763 – November 21, 1816 (aged 52–53)), pastor, Readington Reformed Church and Bedminster Reformed Church
- John Van Liew (September 30, 1798 – October 18, 1869 (aged 71)), pastor, Readington Reformed Church

== See also ==
- North Branch Reformed Church
- Readington Village Historic District

== Bibliography ==
- Snell, James P. (1881). History of Hunterdon and Somerset Counties, New Jersey. Everts & Peck. p. 1.
- Thompson, Henry P. (1882). History of the Reformed Church, at Readington, N.J. 1719–1881. Board of publication of the Reformed church in America. p. 1.
- 1719–1894. Historical Discourse and Addresses Delivered at the 175th Anniversary of the Reformed Church, Readington, N.J. Readington Reformed Church. October 17, 1894.
