= Six Mile Run Reformed Church =

Historic church in New Jersey, United States

- U.S. National Register of Historic Places
- New Jersey Register of Historic Places
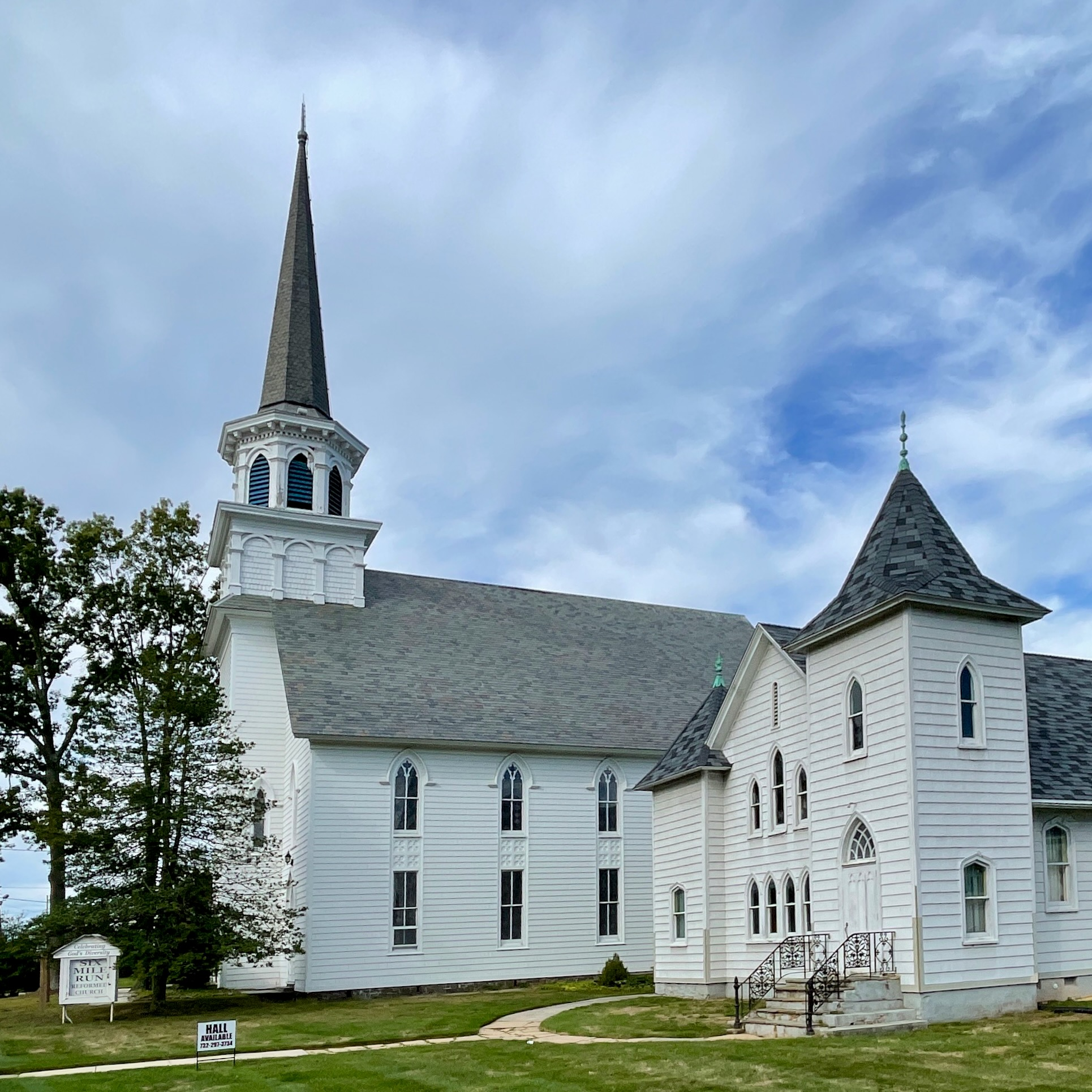
- Six Mile Run Reformed Church and Chapel in 2022

- Location within Somerset County, New Jersey Location within New Jersey Location within the United States
- Location: 3037 New Jersey Route 27; Franklin Park, New Jersey
- Coordinates: 40°26′19″N 74°32′10″W
- Built: 1879
- Architectural style: Late Victorian, Late Gothic Revival
- NRHP reference No.: 09001102
- NJRHP No.: 3527

Significant dates
- Added to NRHP: December 18, 2009
- Designated NJRHP: January 9, 2009

The Six Mile Run Reformed Church is located at 3037 New Jersey Route 27 in Franklin Park (formerly known as Six Mile Run) of Franklin Township, Somerset County, New Jersey, United States. Built in 1879, it was added to the National Register of Historic Places on December 18, 2009, for its significance in architecture and music.

== History ==
The congregation met at the Church of the Three Mile Run, which was built in 1703.

As the congregation grew, new churches were split off with a portion of the congregation. The Six Mile Run congregation emerged in 1710.

In 1720, Reverend Theodorus Jacobus Frelinghuysen became the permanent pastor. He was sent from Holland to take charge of the Dutch churches of Middlesex, Somerset, and Hunterdon counties.

The first building on the present site was built in 1745.

The first building was replaced by a new building in 1766 and was later replaced in 1817 by a third structure on the same site. The current building replaced the 1817 church that was destroyed by fire on January 7, 1879. Within a year the current building was erected and dedicated.

The Frelinghuysen Memorial Chapel was added in 1907. Electricity was installed in 1926. In 1958 Fellowship Hall was dedicated and the Frelinghuysen Memorial Chapel was renovated.

== Pastors ==
- 1983, H. Eugene Speckman.
- 1720, Theodorus Jacobus Frelinghuysen. He was the first pastor of the Six Mile Run Reformed Church.
- Johannes Arondeus

== Gallery ==
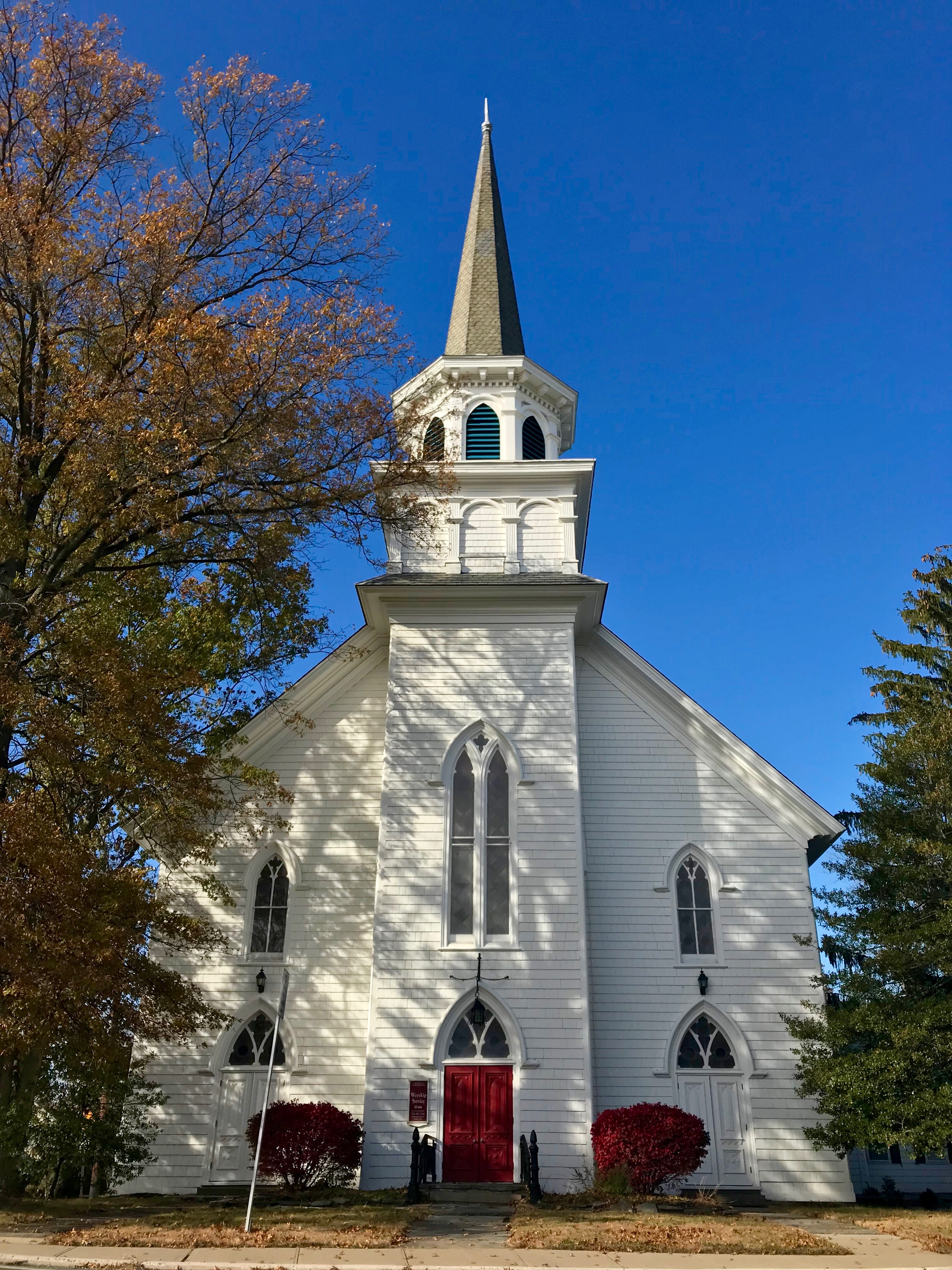
Church in 2017

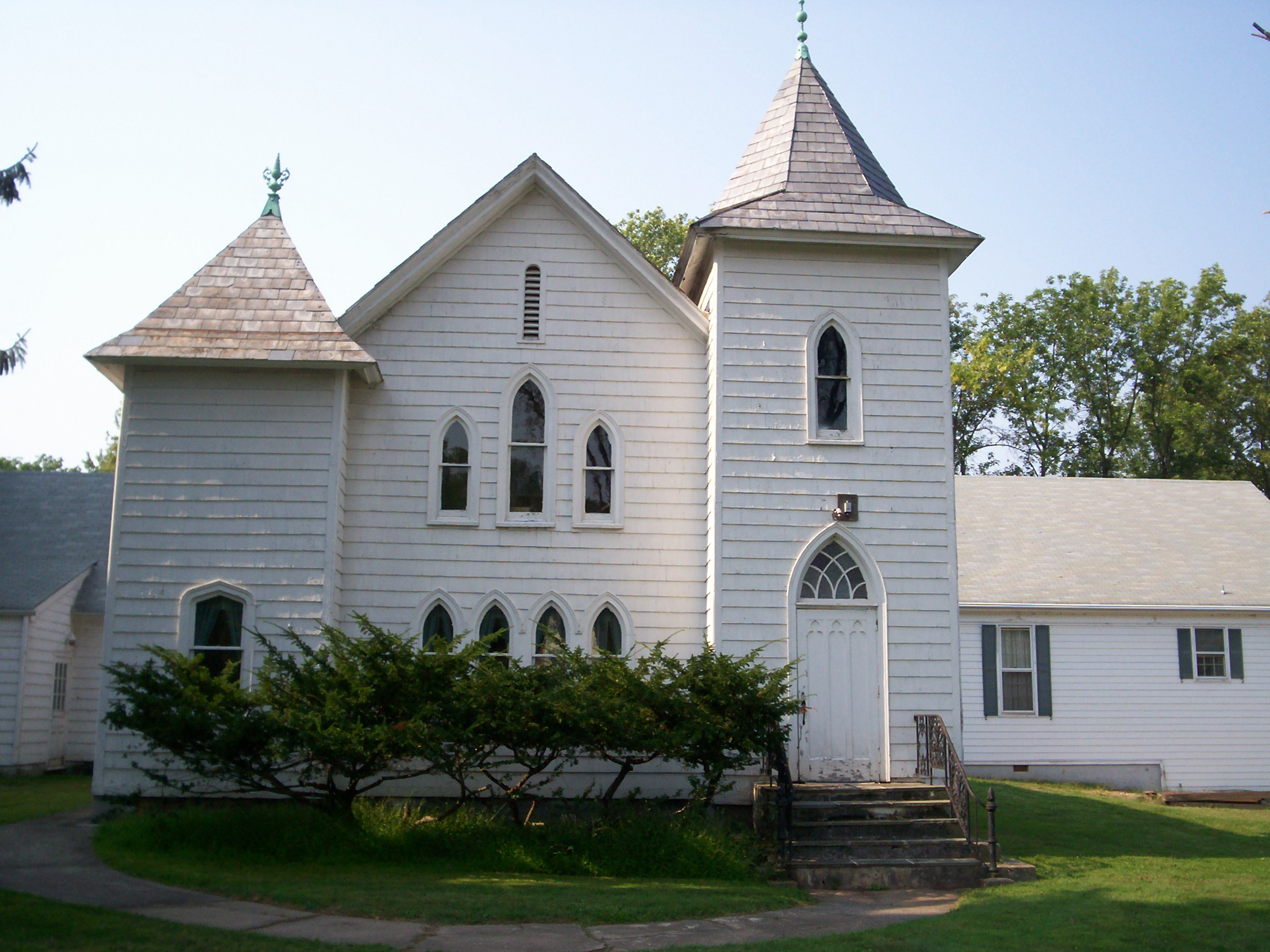
Frelinghuysen Memorial Chapel

== See also ==
- National Register of Historic Places listings in Somerset County, New Jersey
