= Theodorus Jacobus Frelinghuysen =

Dutch-American theologian (c.1691–1747)

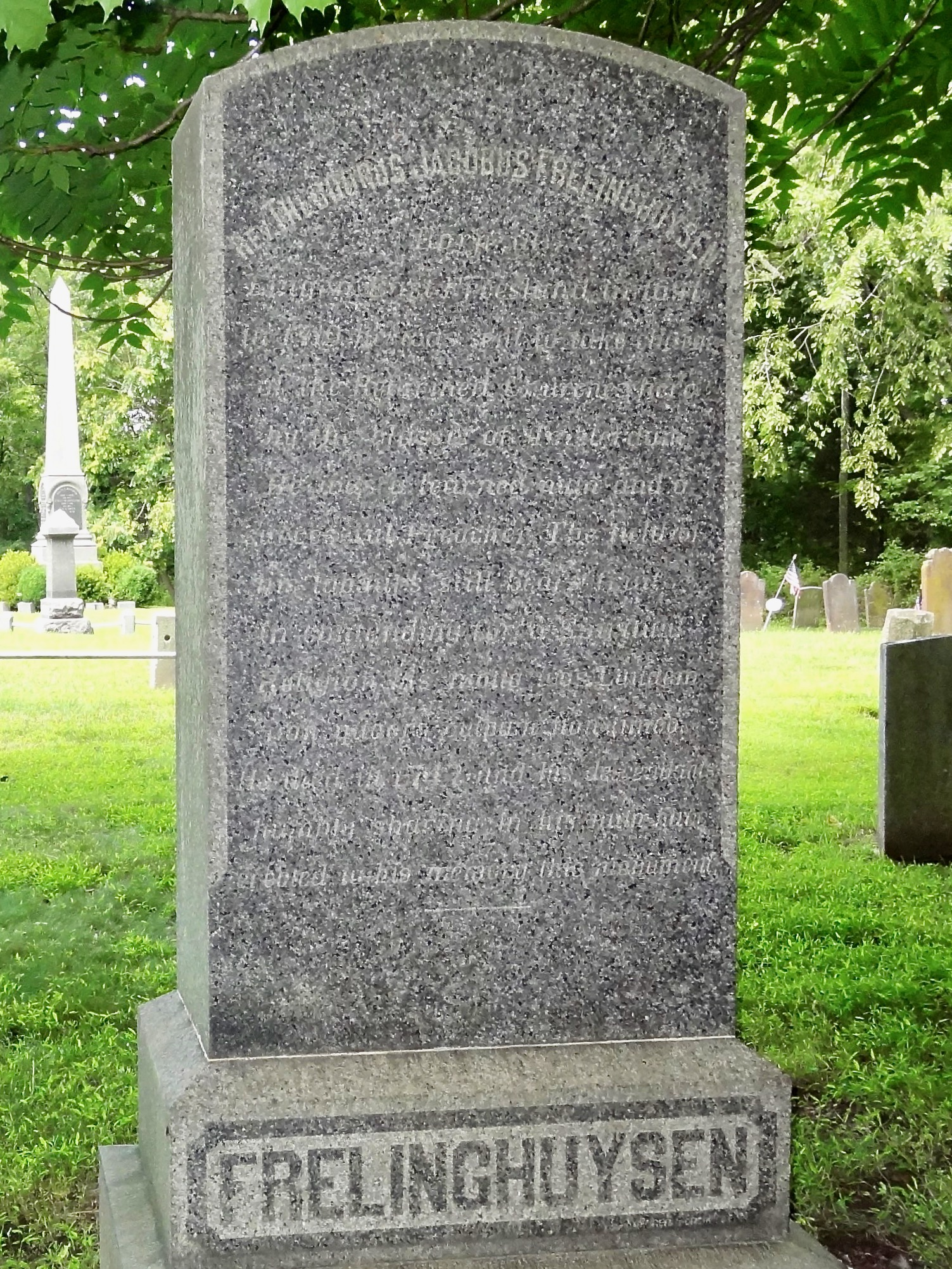
- Cenotaph in Elm Ridge Cemetery, North Brunswick erected in 1884
- Born: 1691; Lingen, Dutch Republic
- Died: 1747 (aged 55–56); Franklin Township, Somerset County, New Jersey
- Occupation: Theologian
- Spouse: Eva Terhune (m. 1721)
- Children: 7, including John
- Family: Frelinghuysen family

Theodorus Jacobus Frelinghuysen (born Theodor Jakob Frelinghaus, c. 1691 – c. 1747) was a German-American Dutch Reformed minister, theologian and the progenitor of the Frelinghuysen family in the United States of America. Frelinghuysen is most remembered for his religious contributions in the Raritan Valley during the beginnings of the First Great Awakening. Several of his descendants became influential theologians and politicians throughout American history.

== Birth and emigration ==
He was born in Lingen, a German-speaking city which then was part of the Union of Utrecht, to Johann Henrich Frelinghaus, a Dutch-Reformed minister; and to Anna Margaretha Brüggemann Frelinghaus (1657–1728). Frelinghuysen was ordained as a minister of the Dutch Reformed Church in 1715 and graduated from the University of Lingen in 1717. For fourteen months he was a minister in Loegumer Voorwerk, in East Friesland, and then for a short time he was co-rector of the Latin school in Enkhuizen, in the Netherlands. In June 1719 he accepted a call from Raritan, in the Province of New Jersey, a British colony in North America, and after a re-ordination for the Dutch Reformed Church by the Classis of Amsterdam, he arrived in America in January 1720.

== Family ==
He married Eva Terhune and had seven children, among them the Reverend Theodorus Jacobus Frelinghuysen II and the Reverend John Frelinghuysen. All five sons became ministers and both daughters married ministers.

The Nigerian-born author James Albert Ukawsaw Gronniosaw, who was enslaved in the 1740s, reported that he was bought for £50 in New York by "Mr. Freelandhouse, a very gracious, good Minister." Freelandhouse is presumed to be Frelinghuysen. Gronniosaw remained enslaved in Frelinghuysen's household until the latter's death.

== Ministry ==
Frelinghuysen served as minister to several of the Dutch Reformed Churches (congregations at Raritan, New Brunswick, Six-Mile Run, Three-Mile Run, and North Branch) in the Raritan River valley of New Jersey which he served until his death in 1747 or 1748.

The Encyclopedia of New Jersey states:

Loyal to the Heidelberg Catechism, he emphasized pietism, conversion, repentance, strict moral standards, private devotions, excommunication, and church discipline. He was an eloquent preacher who published numerous sermons, but struggled against indifferentism and empty formalism. His theories conflicted with the orthodox views of Henry Boel, Johannes Arondeus and others, who challenged Frelinghuysen's religious emotionalism and unauthorized practices. As one of the fearless missionaries of the First Great Awakening in America, Frelinghuysen stressed tangible religious experiences. He trained young men for the clergy, often ordaining them without permission. His evangelical fervor and autonomous actions helped to instill an element of local independence for Dutch churches in North America's middle colonies.

== First Great Awakening ==
Frelinghuysen served as a precursor to the First Great Awakening where his evangelistic contributions culminated in a regional awakening within the Middle Colonies. His ministry was greatly assisted through the efforts of Gilbert Tennent and George Whitefield. He sought to evangelize the Raritan Valley through Reformed pietism, that also owed much to the theological thought of the Puritans as well. Utilizing this theological thought, he employed a three-pronged evangelistic strategy. His chosen evangelistic strategies were preaching, church discipline, and a contextualization of the Dutch Reformed ecclesiastical practices.

His preaching aimed to convince people of the need to examine their lives in order to ascertain the validity of their salvation. In contrast to the staid orthodoxy of many of the Presbyterians and much of the New York Dutch Reformed Clergy, Frelinghuysen's evangelistic preaching penetrated the raw frontier of early eighteenth-century life of New Jersey. He attempted to ingrain within the listener a deep conviction of sin. Frelinghuysen evangelized the New Jersey Colony by using a blunt preaching style which classified his audiences into two basic categories: regenerate and unregenerate. One individual's response to the awakener was offered in the following apt summary: "We welcomed him with joy and love, in the hope that his service would be for our edification. But alas! to our great sorrow, we, soon, and increasingly found that the result was very different. His denunciations uttered against all of us from the pulpit . . . and on all occasions, to the effect that we were all unconverted . . . were severe and bitter."

Church discipline was also utilized to awaken the dormant New Jersey congregations to the realization that some of its parishioners did not meet the scriptural standards of salvation. They were therefore frequently prevented from participating in the sacrament of the Lord's Supper. For Frelinghuysen, "fencing the table", or preventing people from full participation in the sacrament of the Lord's Supper, not only purified the sacrament but it also alerted his parishioners to the stringent need for holy living. Church discipline was a reinforcement of his pietism, for it caused individuals to inspect their lives for holy living. If they failed to see either their sinful hearts or if they could not point to righteous acts of fruit demonstrating salvation, they stood in need of conversion. Consequently, Frelinghuysen stressed that a person's experience of conversion was accompanied by distinguishing outward behaviors which proved them to be recipients of the new birth. Few acts incited such anger for the Colonial citizens as did Frelinghuysen's "fencing the table"

Lastly, in Frelinghuysen's efforts to reach beyond the Colonial church, he rooted his ministry in the Reformation concept that the church would continuously reform, or ecclesia semper reformanda. As he adjusted to the Middle Colonies, Frelinghuysen believed the colonial church was compelled to change for its survival. Faced with a different context from the Netherlands, the result was an Americanizing movement led by Frelinghuysen's arrival in the Colonies in 1720. In place of conformity to Dutch traditions of language, style, and liturgy that were designed for the Netherlands, Frelinghuysen conceived of a church that was not restrained by the formalism prescribed by the Classis of Amsterdam

Though the records for Frelinghuysen's four churches are not used as sources by contemporary church historians, some accounts of the evangelistic results experienced during his ministry remain extant. In 1726, Frelinghuysen admitted thirty-eight new converts to his four churches while an additional sixteen converts were added in 1729, and again in 1734. An additional fifty members were added in 1739, while another twenty-two people were verified as regenerate and able to participate in communion in 1741 in the New Brunswick church. In sum, he gained 180 new converts in the Raritan and New Brunswick churches alone. Such numbers of converts may pale in comparison to the throngs of people who responded to the itinerant evangelist, George Whitefield; yet, these numbers mark a sizeable proportional increase in the churches themselves.

Notably, none other than Jonathan Edwards credited Frelinghuysen with the beginning of the awakening in New Jersey upon his discussion with Gilbert Tennent:

"But this shower of Divine blessing has been yet more extensive. There was no small degree of it in some parts of the Jerseys, as I was informed when I was at New York, (in a long journey I took at that time of the year for my health) by some people of the Jerseys, whom I saw, especially the Rev. Mr. William Tennent, a minister, who seemed to have such things much at heart, told me of a very great awakening of many in a place called the Mountains [sic.], under the ministry of one Mr. Cross; and of a very considerable revival of religion in another place under the ministry of his brother, the Rev. Mr. Gilbert Tennent; and also at another place, under the ministry of a very pious young gentleman, a Dutch minister, whose name as I remember, was Freelinghousa [sic]."

== Motto ==
In 1733, he published several of his sermons with a preface containing his Latin motto "Laudem non-quaero, culpam non-timeo", translated as "I seek not praise, of blame I am not afraid."

== Support for college ==
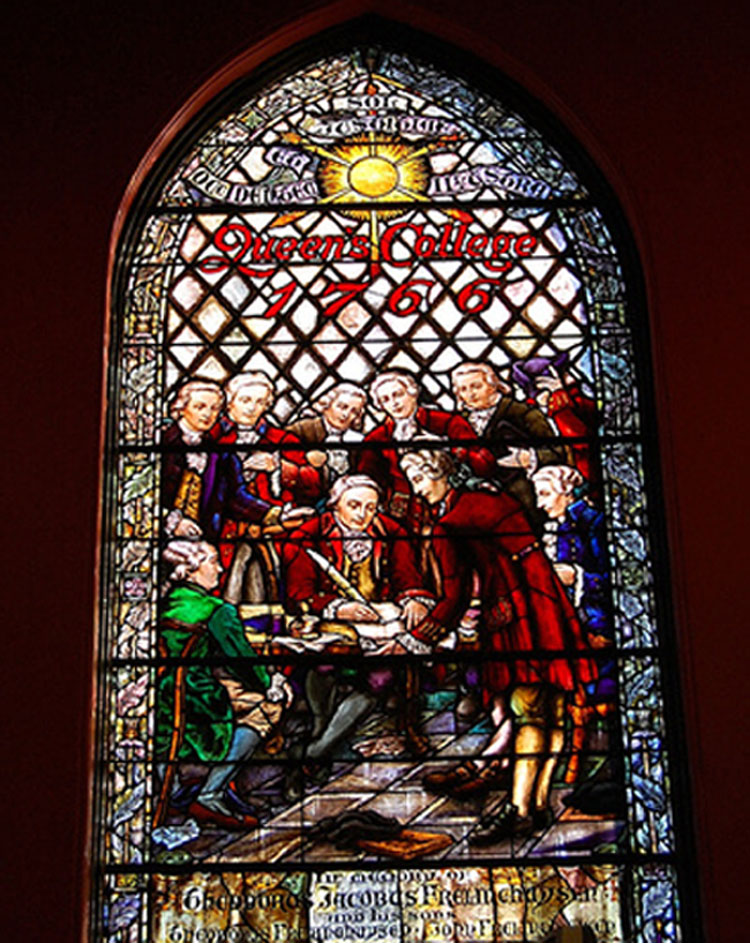
Stained glass window at Kirkpatrick Chapel honoring the Frelinghuysen family

He proposed and supported the movement to establish a college in the area. Later, his sons, Reverend Theodorus Frelinghuysen and Reverend John Frelinghuysen were also very active in this effort. This led to the charter in 1766 of Queen's College in New Brunswick, now Rutgers University.

Frelinghuysen Hall on the New Brunswick campus of Rutgers University is named after him.

== Death ==
He died in 1747 or 1748 in Franklin Township, Somerset County, New Jersey, and was buried at Elm Ridge Cemetery, North Brunswick, New Jersey. He was originally buried without a tombstone. When in 1884 his descendants decided to place a stone on his grave, they could not determine where his body was interred. A cenotaph was placed in the front of the cemetery, which now is the back of the cemetery at the treeline.

Rev. Theodorus Jacobus Frelinghuysen. Born at Lingen, East Freesland in 1691. In 1719, he was sent to take charge of the Reformed Churches here by the Classis of Amsterdam. He was a learned man and a successful preacher. The field of his labor still bears fruit. In contending for a Spiritual Religion his motto was, "Laudem non-quaero, culpam non-timeo." He died in 1747, and his descendants, humbly sharing in his faith, have erected to his memory this monument.
