= Harlingen, New Jersey =

Populated place in Somerset County, New Jersey, US

- Census-designated place
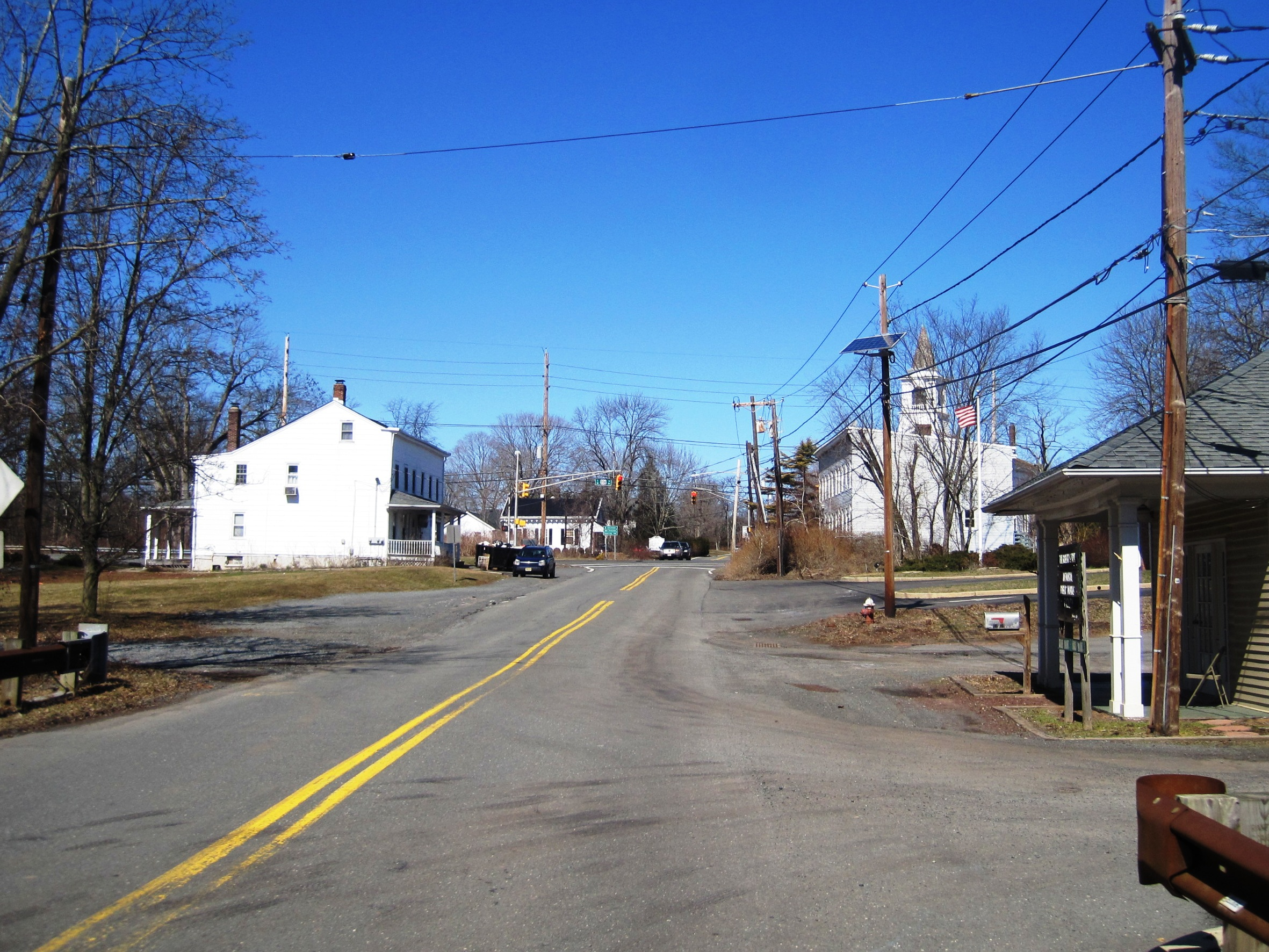
- Harlingen as seen from westbound Harlingen Road

- Location in Somerset County Location in New Jersey Location in the United States
- Coordinates: 40.449363°N 74.658505°W
- Country: United States
- State: New Jersey
- County: Somerset
- Township: Montgomery

Area
  - Total: 0.81 sq mi (2.09 km^{2})
  - Land: 0.81 sq mi (2.09 km^{2})
  - Water: 0 sq mi (0.00 km^{2}) 0.00%
- Elevation: 79 ft (24 m)

Population (2020)
  - Total: 430
  - Density: 533.2/sq mi (205.88/km^{2})
- Time zone: UTC−05:00 (Eastern (EST))
  - Summer (DST): UTC−04:00 (Eastern (EDT))
- Area codes: 609/640 and 732/848
- FIPS code: 34-29940
- GNIS feature ID: 02584000

Harlingen is an unincorporated community and census-designated place (CDP) located within Montgomery Township, in Somerset County, in the U.S. state of New Jersey. As of the 2020 census, Harlingen had a population of 430.

It is adjacent to the historical areas of Dutchtown and Bridgepoint. Harlingen Road and U.S. Route 206 intersect in the center of Harlingen. The Harlingen Dutch Reformed Church on Route 206 is extant and had an associated cemetery. The town was a stop on the short-lived Mercer and Somerset Railway.

== Geography ==
According to the United States Census Bureau, Harlingen had a total area of 0.717 square mile (1.858 km^{2}), all of which was land.

== Demographics ==
Historical population
Census	Pop.	Note	%±
2010	297		—
2020	430		44.8%
Population sources: 2010 2020

Harlingen first appeared as a census designated place in the 2010 U.S. census.

=== 2020 census ===
Harlingen CDP, New Jersey – Racial and ethnic composition Note: the US Census treats Hispanic/Latino as an ethnic category. This table excludes Latinos from the racial categories and assigns them to a separate category. Hispanics/Latinos may be of any race.
Race / Ethnicity (NH = Non-Hispanic)	Pop 2010	Pop 2020	% 2010	% 2020
White alone (NH)	221	162	74.41%	37.67%
Black or African American alone (NH)	5	9	1.68%	2.09%
Native American or Alaska Native alone (NH)	0	0	0.00%	0.00%
Asian alone (NH)	49	216	16.50%	50.23%
Native Hawaiian or Pacific Islander alone (NH)	0	0	0.00%	0.00%
Other race alone (NH)	0	1	0.00%	0.23%
Mixed race or Multiracial (NH)	5	17	1.68%	3.95%
Hispanic or Latino (any race)	17	25	5.72%	5.81%
Total	297	430	100.00%	100.00%

=== 2010 census ===
The 2010 United States census counted 297 people, 93 households, and 81 families in the CDP. The population density was 414.1 per square mile (159.9/km^{2}). There were 98 housing units at an average density of 136.6 per square mile (52.7/km^{2}). The racial makeup was 77.78% (231) White, 1.68% (5) Black or African American, 0.00% (0) Native American, 16.50% (49) Asian, 0.00% (0) Pacific Islander, 2.36% (7) from other races, and 1.68% (5) from two or more races. Hispanic or Latino of any race were 5.72% (17) of the population.

Of the 93 households, 54.8% had children under the age of 18; 79.6% were married couples living together; 4.3% had a female householder with no husband present and 12.9% were non-families. Of all households, 10.8% were made up of individuals and 3.2% had someone living alone who was 65 years of age or older. The average household size was 3.19 and the average family size was 3.46.

30.6% of the population were under the age of 18, 7.4% from 18 to 24, 16.2% from 25 to 44, 38.7% from 45 to 64, and 7.1% who were 65 years of age or older. The median age was 42.3 years. For every 100 females, the population had 113.7 males. For every 100 females ages 18 and older there were 100.0 males.

== Harlingen Dutch Reformed Church ==
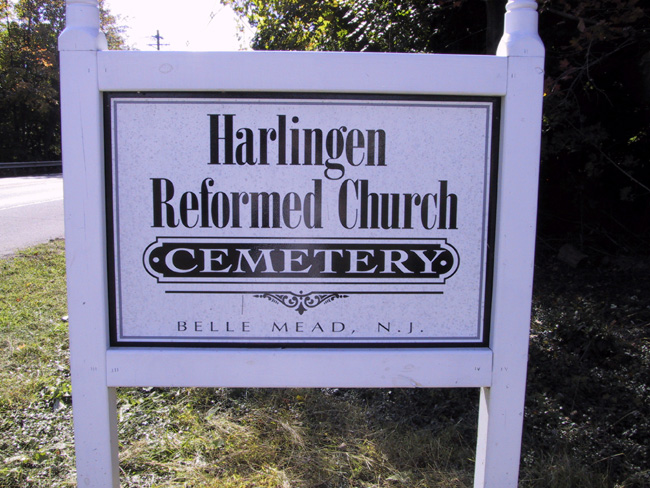
Harlingen Dutch Reformed Church Cemetery

The Harlingen Dutch Reformed Church is in the Belle Mead, New Jersey section of Montgomery Township. The congregation was organized in 1727, and the minister was one of the major antagonists in the dispute between the traditionalists and the American party that contested governance of the Dutch Reformed Church. The church is still active.

The Reverend Johannes Arondeus, sent by the Classis of Amsterdam, was pastor from 1747 to 1754.
