= Raritan Water Power Canal =

Coordinates: 40.55505°N 74.65978°W

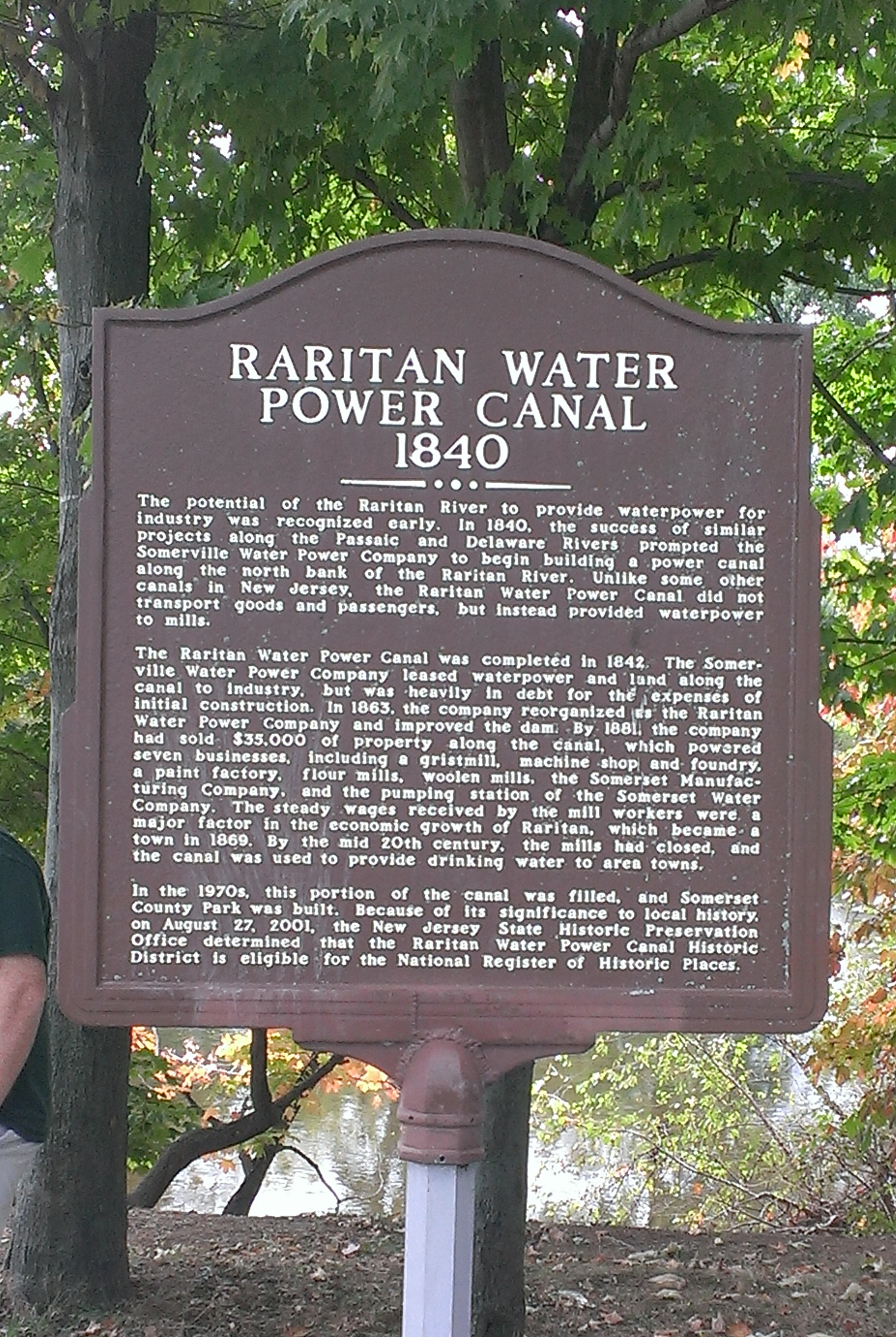
The sign marking the Raritan Water Power Canal

The Raritan Water Power Canal in Raritan, New Jersey was a three-mile long water power canal built during the early 1840s to power industries. The canal has been determined to be eligible for the National Register. The canal is included in Duke Island Park, as part of the Somerset County Park System.

The canal was originally constructed by the Somerset Water Power Company. This company was incorporated on Feb 28, 1840 but went bankrupt. The Raritan Water Power Company was incorporated on March 24, 1863 and took over the canal, head gates, water power, water rights, and franchises.

The Raritan Water Power Canal Historic District was listed on August 27, 2001 with NJHPO ID#3633.
