= Holland Brook =

Holland Brook (NJ, USA) Holland's Brook, Amanmechunk
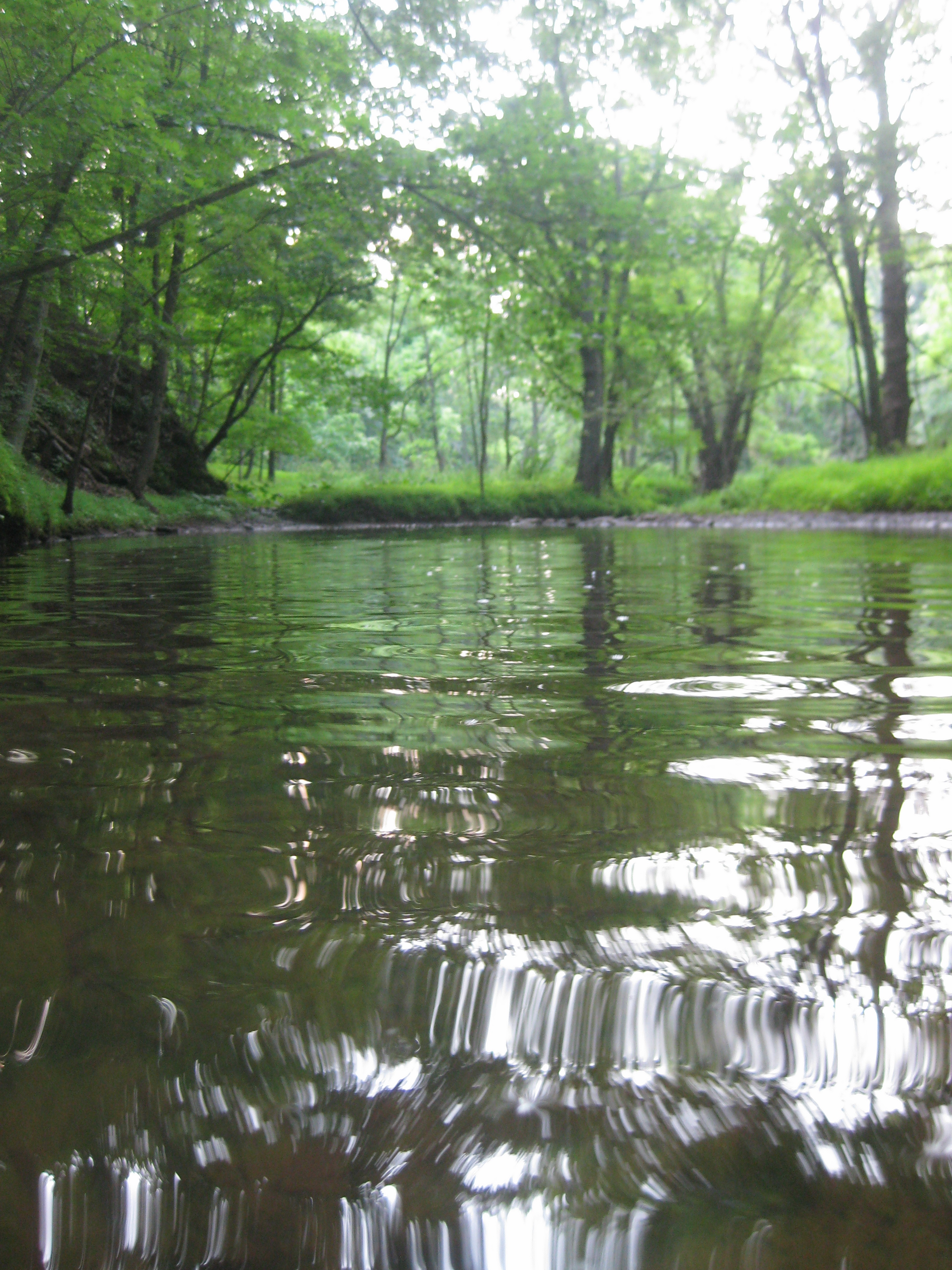
- Holland Brook in Readington Township
- Etymology: Named after Thomas Holland

Location
- Country: United States
- State: New Jersey
- Region: Raritan Valley
- City: Readington, Branchburg

Physical characteristics
- Source: Cushetunk Mountain
  - location: Readington, Raritan Valley, New Jersey, United States
  - coordinates: 40°35′19.2″N 74°49′3.64″W
  - elevation: 372 ft (113 m)
- Mouth: South Branch Raritan River
  - location: Branchburg, Raritan Valley, New Jersey, United States
  - coordinates: 40°32′56.17″N 74°41′39.54″W
  - elevation: 64 ft (20 m)
- Length: 7 mi (11 km)

Basin features
- Tributaries
  - left: Dreahook Creek, Stone Creek

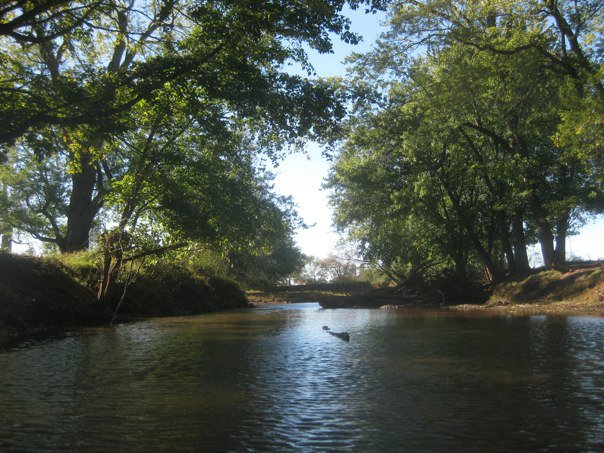
Mouth of Holland Brook near South Branch

Holland Brook is a tributary of the South Branch Raritan River in Hunterdon and Somerset Counties, New Jersey in the United States.

Holland Brook flows through Readington and Branchburg. It is the last tributary of the South Branch Raritan River before it combines with the North Branch Raritan River.

The brook is over seven miles in length running from its headwaters near Cushetunk Mountain, a plutonic intrusion of igneous rock surrounding Round Valley Reservoir, to its convergence with the South Branch Raritan River near Studdiford Drive in Branchburg. The brook is ten to twenty feet across most of its length. It changes over 300 feet in elevation from its headwaters to its convergence with the Raritan River.

Holland Brook was originally named Holland's Brook for Thomas Holland of Piscataway, who was married to Winifred Pound. Thomas Holland was a descendant of the translator Philemon Holland. Holland was an early property owner along the brook, although he never resided there. The recorded Lenape name for the Brook was Amanmechunk. This word in the Unami dialect meant large creek.

== Greenway ==
From the greenway at Holland Brook Preserve in Readington, New Jersey

The Holland Brook Greenway is a proposed five-mile greenway project in Readington and Branchburg. If both townships completed the trail, it could link another future trail on the North Branch Raritan River with the Middle School in Readington and the Lachenmayr Trail. Branchburg’s proposed section of the Greenway would fit into a larger plan and would connect with a 16-mile cross-township trail. The Holland Brook Greenway trail could eventually provide access to the Raritan River Greenway and the East Coast Greenway.

The township of Branchburg would need to gain four additional properties to have public access from the Readington border to the Confluence Reservoir Park land along the North Branch Raritan River. A possible trail along this path would need to make minor crossings at South Branch Road (near a number of farms), Evergreen Drive (in a residential neighborhood) and the somewhat busier Old York Road. A fourth crossing over US-202, however, would need to be constructed to ensure a safe passage for bicycles or pedestrians. At-grade crossings with crosswalks would be possible at South Branch Road and Evergreen Drive and the trail could possibly go under the bridge at Old York Road. The Readington section still has several gaps in it and no official segments of the Greenway has been built in either township.

== Tributaries ==
The headwaters of Holland Brook road at the base of Cushetunk Mountain

Holland Brook has ten unnamed tributaries in Branchburg and Readington listed on NJDEP's website. They all are categorized as FW2-NT (fresh water second level classification generally not suitable for trout). Two named ones are below:

- Dreahook Creek
- Stone Creek

== Crossings ==
=== Readington ===
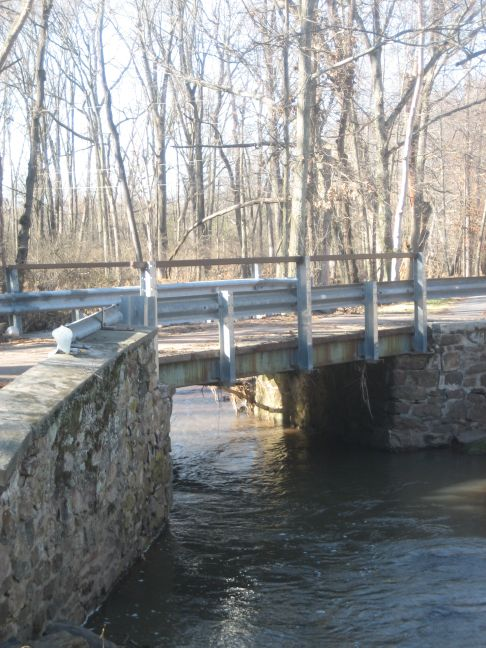
Roosevelt Road Bridge

- Dreahook Road
- Voorhees Road
- Dogwood Drive
- CR 523/Flemington-Whitehouse Road (brown sign on bridge)
- Holland Brook Road (2 crossings)
- Roosevelt Road
- Pine Bank Road (2 crossings)
- Hillcrest Road in Readington Village

=== Branchburg ===
- Old York Road
- US 202
- West County Drive

== Schools ==
The first Holland Brook School was in Readington Village in the 19th century. In 1791, an act was passed "to incorporate societies for the advancement of learning". On August 4, 1804, Abraham Post, Peter Quick, Isaac Berkaw, William Dalley, William Spader, Cornelius Van Horn, Abraham Smock, Andrew Mattis, Adrian Stryker, Peter Ten Brook, William Ditmars and Derrick de Mott incorporated the Holland Brook School. One of the teachers at the school was Colonel John Mehelm. The site of Mehelm's house on New Bromley Road, which burned in the 1960s, has a historical marker in front of it. The school eventually changed names to Readington School and closed in 1897.

The second and current Holland Brook School is a primary school for fourth and fifth grades and was built adjacent to the Readington Middle School.

== See also ==
- List of rivers of New Jersey
