= New Jersey Lottery Festival of Ballooning =

American hot air balloon festival since 1983

Coordinates: 40.5825°N 74.7319°W

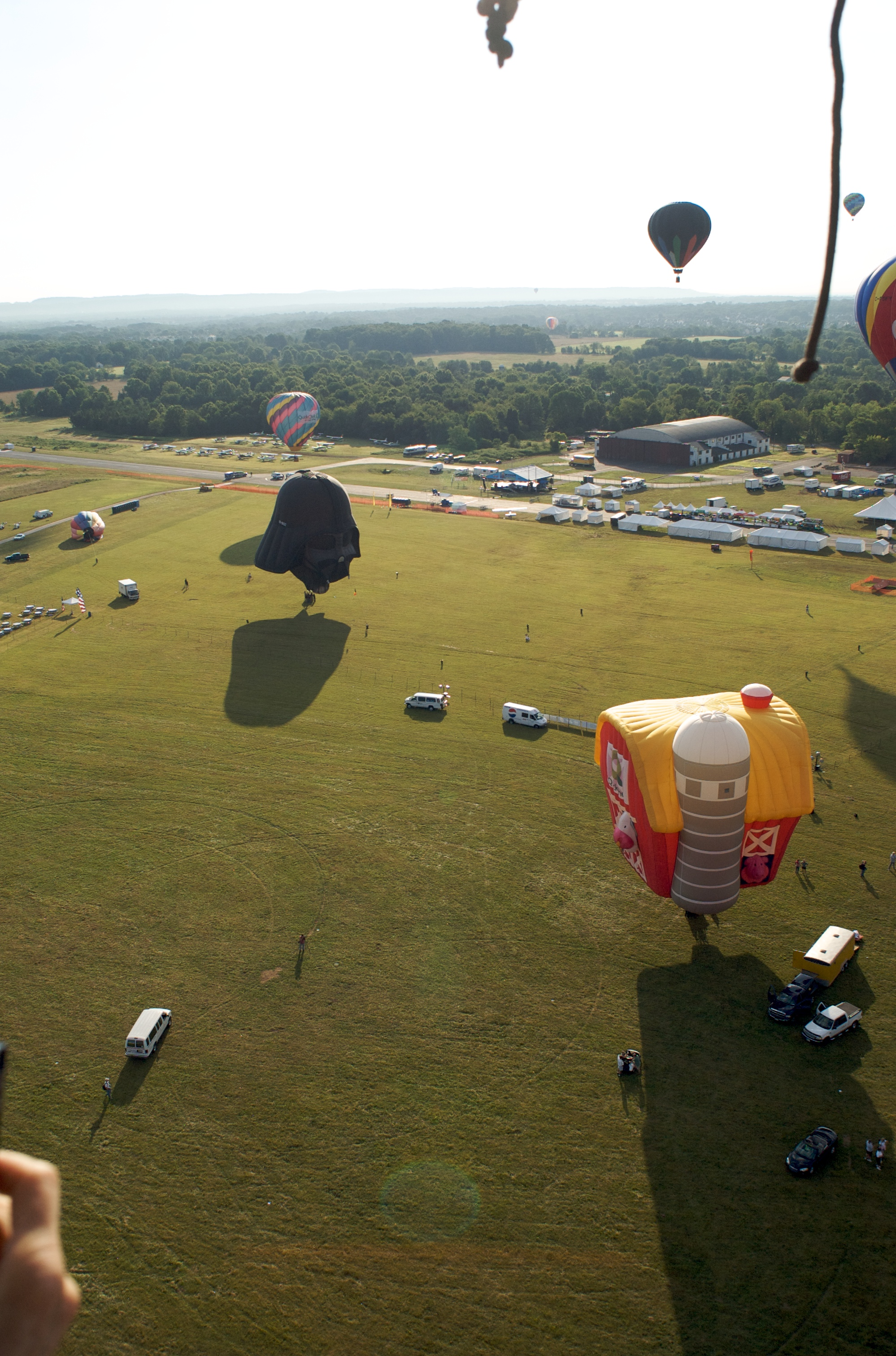
- Festival in 2008
- Begins: Third Friday in July
- Ends: Sunday
- Frequency: Annual until 2023
- Locations: Solberg Airport, Readington Township, New Jersey
- Inaugurated: 1983
- Participants: Balloonists

The New Jersey Lottery Festival of Ballooning was a hot air balloon festival which had been held annually at the Solberg Airport in Readington Township, New Jersey since 1983. Its most recent lead sponsor was the New Jersey Lottery. In 2012, the festival hosted around 125 special shape and sport hot air balloons. It also had music concerts, crafters and vendors, food, carnival rides and fireworks, which attracted more than 175,000 people. It had more than fifty corporate partners. It was cancelled in both 2024 and 2025 and its future remains uncertain.

== Festival Information and History ==
In 1983, Bill Lewis, working with USA Today, brought approximately ten hot air balloons to the Union 76 Truck Stop on Interstate 78 in New Jersey for the inaugural event. After two years they moved the festival to its current site at Solberg Airport where it grew to 40-50 balloons and 30,000-40,000 attendees. In 1993, Howard Freeman and John Korff acquired the New Jersey Festival of Ballooning and signed a long-term deal with Solberg Airport. That same year they secured a long term sponsorship agreement with QuickChek. In time, the festival has become the largest event in New Jersey and the largest summertime balloon festival in North America.

In 2000, to differentiate the festival from other balloon festivals, major concerts were added to the festival. The first concert presented the legendary band, The Beach Boys. Each subsequent festival included three major concerts. Headliners have included The Doobie Brothers, Hall & Oates, Styx, Foreigner, America, Jonas Brothers and KC & the Sunshine Band.

In 2020, the Festival of Ballooning began a new partnership with the New Jersey Lottery becoming the festival's title sponsor. Unfortunately, later on in the year the festival got cancelled due to the COVID-19 pandemic. It resumed in July 2021.

A portion of all proceeds from the festival are donated to the Children's Miracle Network, which funds three pediatric hospitals in New Jersey.

=== Virgin ritual ===
Since 2004, the festival has hired a virgin to perform a ritual to ensure good weather for the festival. Howard Freeman, one of the organizers, claims the ritual comes from Singapore. It involves having a virgin drive a golf cart to each of the four corners of the festival site. At each corner she picks up blades of grass, mumbles random words, penetrates whole onions and peppers with knives, then jams the knives with the produce into the ground.

The 2007 virgin, Victoria Brumfield (born 1979), said it is a mixture of "fun and embarrassment" and that "if it does rain, my virtue is not to blame. I'm waiting until I'm married and no one has asked yet." She is a devout Mormon.

=== Recent cancellations ===
The festival celebrated its 40th anniversary at Solberg Airport in 2023, but was cancelled in 2024 and 2025 due to various issues. Reasons cited included spiraling costs, logistical challenges, and unpredictable weather.

== See also ==
- Hot air balloon festivals
