= Solberg–Hunterdon Airport =

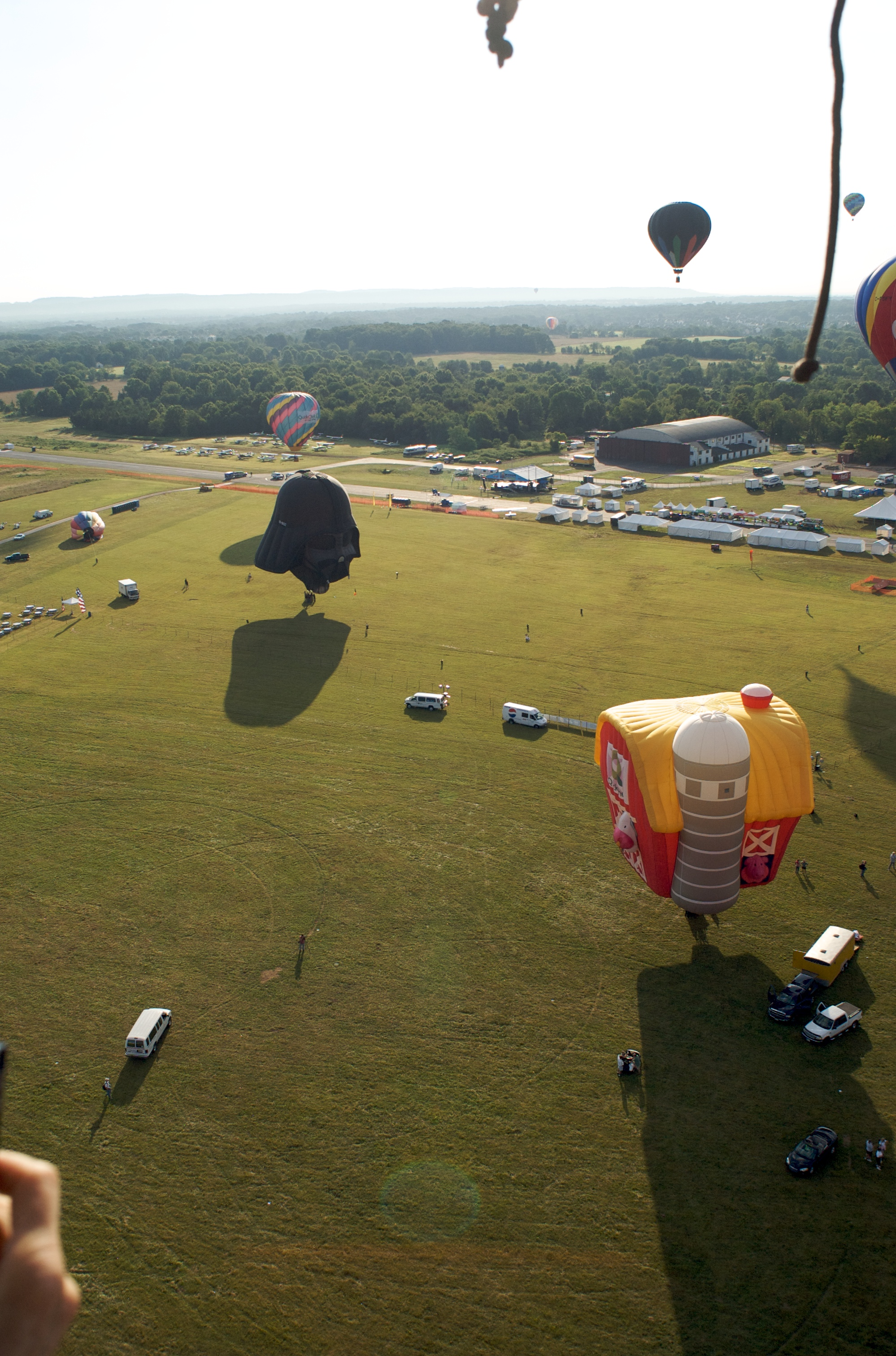
- IATA: none; ICAO: none; FAA LID: N51

Summary
- Airport type: Public use
- Owner: Solberg Aviation Company
- Operator: Solberg/Nagle family
- Location: Readington Township, Hunterdon County, New Jersey
- Elevation AMSL: 189 ft / 58 m
- Coordinates: 40.5802°N 74.7355°W
- Website: www.solbergairport.com

Map
- Interactive map of Solberg–Hunterdon Airport

Runways
| Direction | Length | | Surface |
| Direction | ft | m | Surface |
|---|---|---|---|
| 4/22 | 5,598 | 1,706 | Asphalt/turf |
| 10/28 | 2,010 | 613 | Turf |
| 13/31 | 3,444 | 1,050 | Turf |

Statistics (2022)
- Aircraft operations (year ending 6/24/2022): 23,005
- Based aircraft: 47
- Source: Federal Aviation Administration

Solberg–Hunterdon Airport (FAA LID: N51), also known as Solberg Airport, is located in Readington Township, New Jersey, United States.

== History ==
Founded in 1941 by Norwegian-born and -raised aviation pioneer Thor Solberg, Solberg Airport is a small general aviation airport located in central New Jersey. In 1985 Solberg was inducted into the New Jersey Aviation Hall of Fame. He is also considered a major aviation pioneer in his native country. Norway's oldest airport, Jarlsberg, is dedicated to his memory, and today operates as a major general aviation airport and parachute center near the ancient city of Tønsberg in southeastern Norway.

Solberg's son and namesake, Thor Solberg Jr., died on December 16, 2017. The airport is currently run by two generations of Thor Solberg's heirs. His children, Lorraine Solberg and Suzy Solberg Nagle, maintain day-to-day operations with the help of four grandchildren.

== Facilities and aircraft ==
Solberg Airport is situated on 744 acres in Readington, and contains three runways. The primary runway is 4/22, measuring 5,598 x 50 ft (1,706 x 15 m). 3,735 ft (1,138 m) of this runway is paved with asphalt, and 1,863 ft (568 m) is turf reserved as a displaced threshold, and 10/28, measuring 2,010 x 100 ft (613 x 30m). The third runway, 13/31, is turf measuring 3,444 x 200 ft (1,050 x 61 m).

For the 12-month period ending June 24, 2022, the airport had 23,005 aircraft operations, an average of 63 per day: 64% local general aviation and 36% transient general aviation. At that time there were 47 aircraft based at this airport: 39 single-engine, 5 multi-engine, 1 helicopters, and 2 gliders.

== Balloon festival ==
The New Jersey Lottery Festival of Ballooning celebrated its 40th anniversary at Solberg Airport in 2023, but was cancelled in 2024 and 2025 due to various issues. In 2007, the event was the largest summertime hot air balloon festival in North America, and was run by Howard Freidman and Sally Mazzochi.

== Presidential temporary flight restrictions ==
Solberg Airport is within a 10-mile radius of the Trump National Golf Club in Bedminster, New Jersey. During the presidency of Donald Trump, the airport is subject to FAA flight restrictions whenever Trump is in Bedminster.

== See also ==
- List of airports in New Jersey
