= Midland =

Midland may refer to:

== Places ==
=== Australia ===
- Midland, Western Australia
- Electoral district of Midland, an electorate of the Western Australian Legislative Assembly

=== Canada ===
- Midland, Albert County, New Brunswick
- Midland, Kings County, New Brunswick
- Midland, Newfoundland and Labrador
- Midland, Ontario

=== India ===
- Midland Ward, Kohima, Nagaland
- Madhyadesha (lit. 'middle country/land'), historical region of northern and central India
- Madhya Pradesh (lit. 'middle region'), state of India

=== Ireland ===
- Midland Region, Ireland

=== United States ===
- Midland, Arkansas
- Midland, California
- Midoil, California, formerly Midland
- Midland, Georgia
- Midland, Indiana
- Midland, Kentucky
- Midland, Louisiana
- Midland, Maryland
- Midland, Michigan
- Midland, Missouri
- Midland, North Carolina
- Midlands of South Carolina
- Midland, Ohio
- Midland, Oregon
- Midland, Pennsylvania
- Midland, South Dakota
- Midland, Tennessee
- Midland, Texas
- Midland, Virginia
- Midland, Washington
- Midland City, Alabama

== Railways ==
- Buenos Aires Midland Railway, a former British-owned railway company in Argentina
- Colorado Midland Railway, US
- Florida Midland Railroad (disambiguation), US
- Midland Railroad (Massachusetts), US
- Midland Main Line, a UK major railway line
- Midland Railway, a former railway company in the UK
- Midland Railway of Canada, a former railway company in eastern Canada
- Midland Railway of Western Australia, a former railway company in Western Australia
- Midland (TTC), a former rapid transit stop in Scarborough, Ontario, Canada
- New Zealand Midland Railway Company, a former railway company

== Schools ==
- Midland High School (disambiguation)
- Midland School, Los Olivos, California, US
- Midland School, North Branch, New Jersey, US
- Midland University, Fremont, Nebraska, US

== Other uses ==
- Midland (band), a country music group
- Midland (DJ), a London DJ
- Midland (electoral district), an electoral district in Manitoba, Canada
- Midland American English, a regional dialect
- Midland Bank, a former high street bank in the UK, now renamed HSBC Bank
- Midland District (South Australian Legislative Council), electoral district
- Midland F1 Racing, a former Formula One racing team
- Midland Group, a Russian construction team, owners of Midland F1
- Midland Holdings, one of the largest real estate agents in Hong Kong
- Midland Radio, an American manufacturer of wireless two way radio equipment
- Midland Credit Management, Inc. an American debt buyer
- The Midland (magazine), regional magazine in the United States
- Operation Midland, British police investigation into supposed historical child abuse allegations
- Club Ferrocarril Midland, Argentine football club based in the Greater Buenos Aires

== See also ==
- Mittellandkanal, the Midland Canal, Germany
- Midland City (disambiguation)
- Midland County (disambiguation)
- Midland Township (disambiguation)
- Midland Airport (disambiguation)
- Midland Hotel (disambiguation)
- Midlands (disambiguation)
