= Midland School =

Midland School may refer to:

- Midland School, Los Olivos, California
- Midland School, North Branch, New Jersey

== See also ==
Midland High School (disambiguation)
