= National Register of Historic Places listings in Haakon County, South Dakota =

Location of Haakon County in South Dakota

This is a list of the National Register of Historic Places listings in Haakon County, South Dakota.

This is intended to be a complete list of the properties on the National Register of Historic Places in Haakon County, South Dakota, United States. The locations of National Register properties for which the latitude and longitude coordinates are included below, may be seen in a map.

There are four properties listed on the National Register in the county. Another property was once listed but has been removed.

This National Park Service list is complete through NPS recent listings posted December 12, 2025.

== Current listing ==
	Name on the Register	Image	Date listed	Location	City or town	Description
1	Haakon County Courthouse	Haakon County Courthouse	March 14, 2019 (#100003442)	140 Howard Ave. 44°02′20″N 101°40′00″W	Philip	Listed for its as the center of county government since its construction as well as an example of Art Deco architecture exemplified during the pre-World War II era.
2	Midland Depot	Midland Depot	November 18, 2019 (#100004621)	400 blk. of Main St. 44°04′14″N 101°09′23″W	Midland	Currently the Pioneer Museum
3	Stroppel Hotel and Hot Mineral Baths		September 2, 2025 (#100012183)	602 Main Street; 44°04′14″N 101°09′15″W	Midland	
4	Waddell Block	Waddell Block	February 24, 2010 (#10000049)	East Pine Street; 44°02′21″N 101°39′52″W	Philip	

== Former listing ==
	Name on the Register	Image	Date listed	Date removed	Location	City or town	Description
1	Bank of Midland Building	Bank of Midland Building	August 13, 1986 (#86001481)	April 11, 2014	Main Street; 44°04′13″N 101°09′15″W	Midland	
