= Central Midlands =

Central Midlands may refer to:

- Central Midlands Coastal Football League
- Midlands Central (European Parliament constituency)
- Central Midlands Football League
- Central Midlands Regional Transit Authority

== See also ==
- Midlands (disambiguation)
