= North Branch, New Jersey =

Place in Somerset County, New Jersey, United States

- Unincorporated community
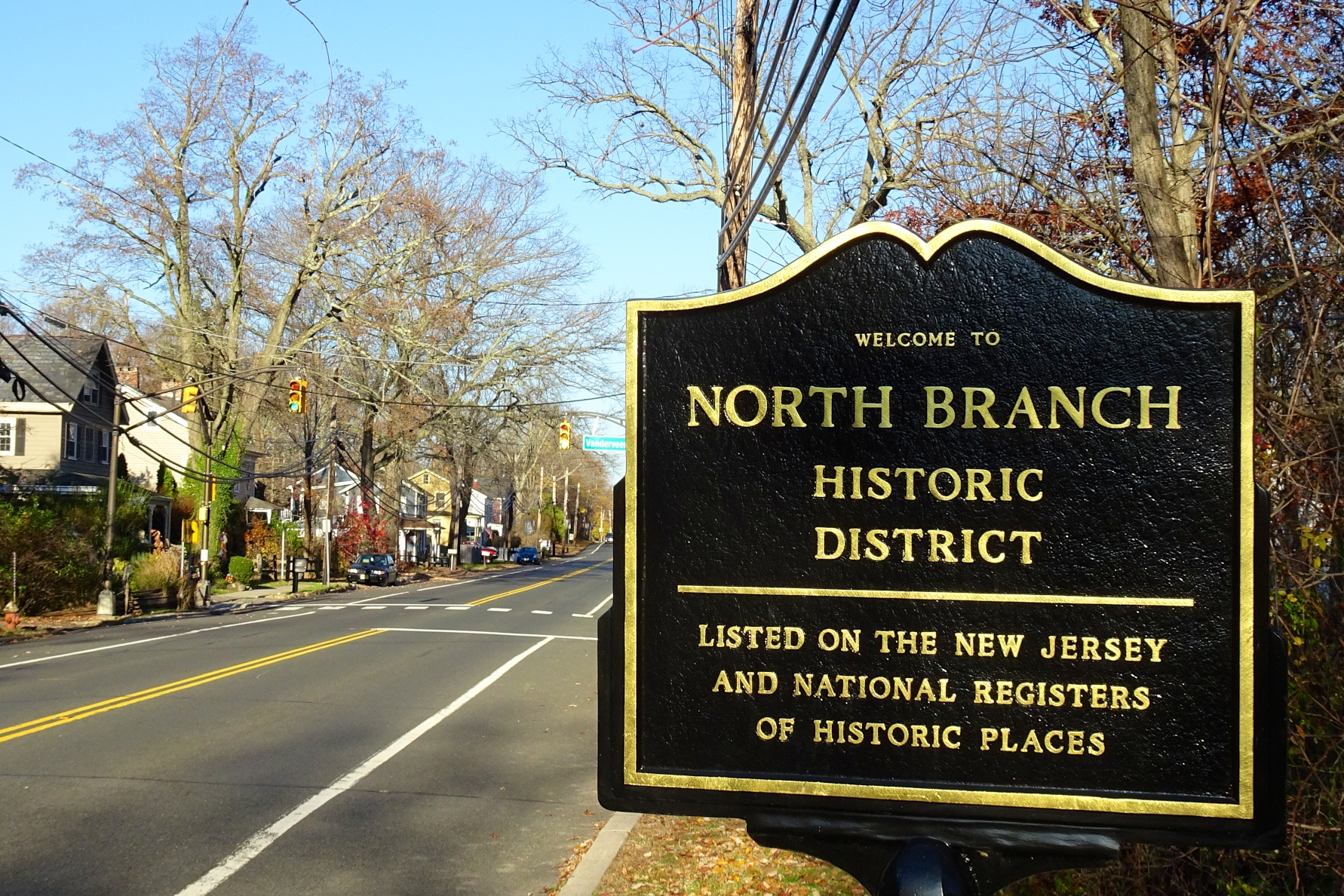
- North Branch Historic District sign

- Location within Somerset County, New Jersey Location within New Jersey Location within the United States
- Coordinates: 40°36′07″N 74°40′39″W
- Country: United States
- State: New Jersey
- County: Somerset
- Township: Branchburg
- Time zone: UTC-5 (Eastern (EST))
  - Summer (DST): UTC-4 (EDT)
- GNIS feature ID: 878824

North Branch is an unincorporated community and hamlet located mostly within Branchburg in Somerset County, New Jersey, United States. A portion of North Branch is located in Bridgewater. The hamlet of North Branch, located on both sides of the North Branch of the Raritan River, brings the ambiance of a small village and charm to the area.

The North Branch Volunteer Fire Company provides fire protection to western Bridgewater Township and northern Branchburg Township. The company's 30 volunteers cover almost 12 square miles (31 km^{2}) and 15,000 residents.

== Education ==
The Branchburg portion of the area is home to the Midland School, a school serving students with developmental disabilities from a number of public school districts. In 2005, the Bridgewater-Raritan Regional School District opened Milltown School, an elementary school located on the east bank of the North Branch river.

Raritan Valley Community College (RVCC) is located north of the intersection of old Route 28 and Lamington Road on a 240-acre (97 ha) site acquired in 1968. Rutgers University has a partnership with Raritan Valley Community College that allows students who have an associate degree to complete a bachelor's degree through the off-campus Rutgers location at Raritan Valley Community College's North Branch campus.

== Notable people ==
People who were born in, residents of, or otherwise closely associated with North Branch include:

- Raymond Bateman (1927–2016), politician, who represented Somerset County in the New Jersey Senate in the 1960s and 1970s and was the Republican candidate for Governor of New Jersey in 1977.
- Daniel H. Beekman (1874-1951), Judge of the Somerset County Court of Common Pleas, President of the Second National Bank of Somerville, and Democratic politician.
- Robert Cox (1813–1890), politician who served in the Michigan House of Representatives.

== Points of interest ==
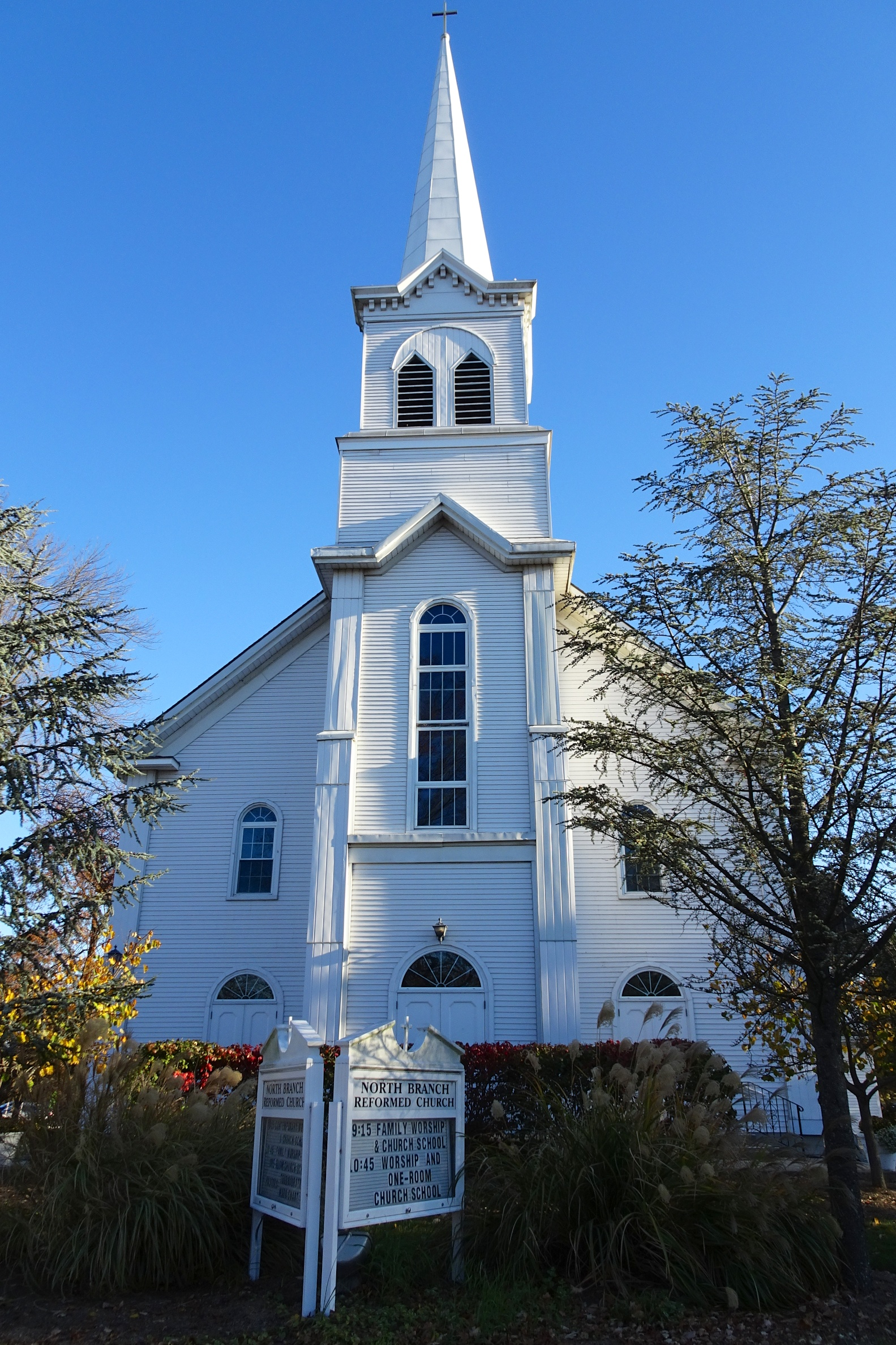
North Branch Reformed Church

- North Branch Reformed Church

== Historic district ==
The North Branch Historic District on the western side of the North Branch was added to the National Register of Historic Places on April 16, 2012.

== See also ==
- North Branch Historic District
