= North Branch Reformed Church =

Historic site in Somerset County, New Jersey, US

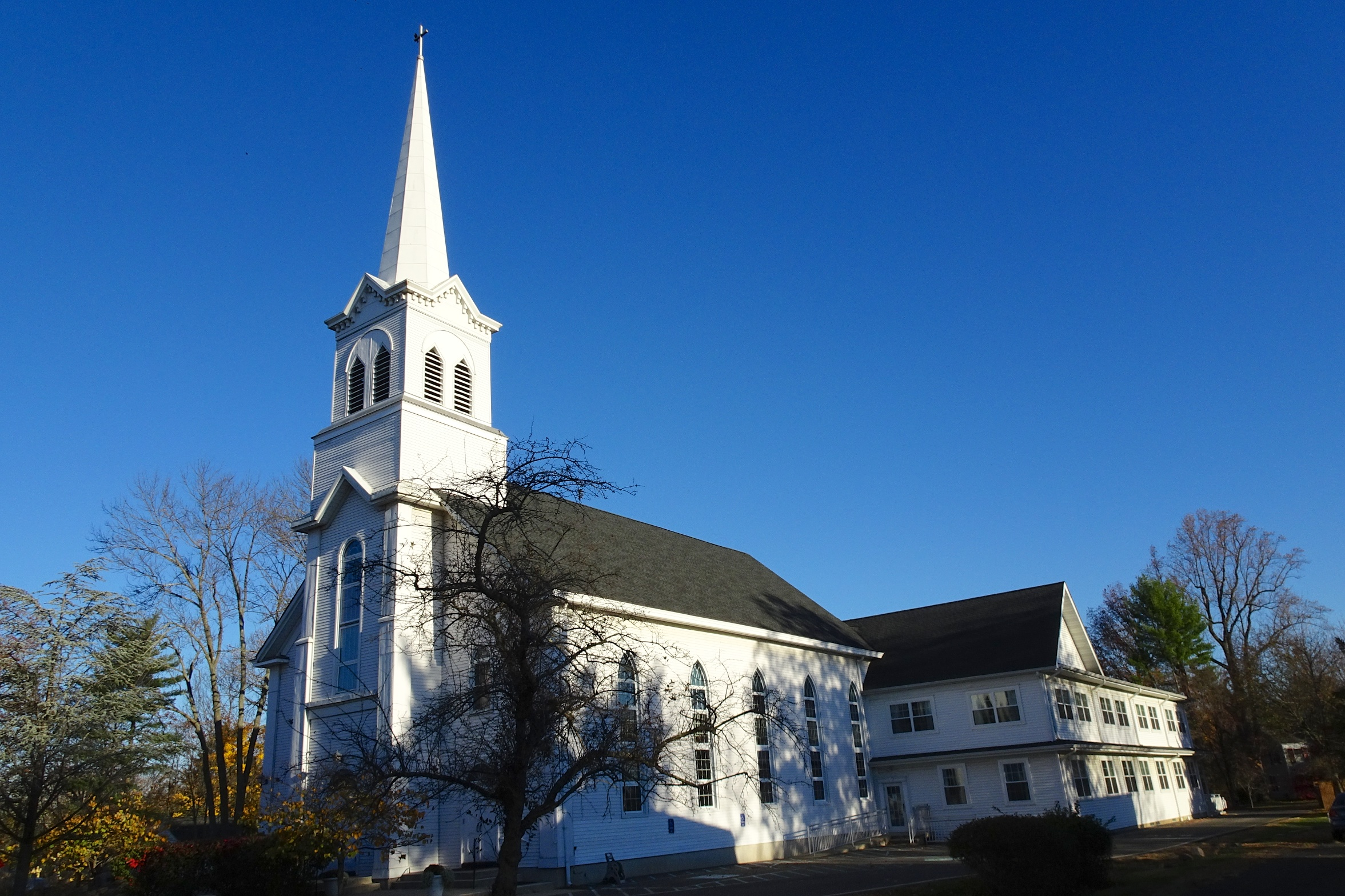

- Location within Somerset County, New Jersey
- 40°35′56″N 74°40′16″W
- Location: 203 New Jersey Route 28; North Branch, New Jersey
- Country: United States
- Denomination: Reformed Church in America
- Website: www.nbrc.com

History
- Founded: September 10, 1825

The North Branch Reformed Church is a historic church located on the eastern side of the North Branch of the Raritan River in North Branch, New Jersey at 203 New Jersey Route 28. It was formed by expansion from the Readington Reformed Church. The church was organized on September 10, 1825. The first church was built in 1826 and later rebuilt in 1874. The Church plans to celebrate its bicentennial anniversary in 2025. The current Pastor is Pastor Amy Nyland

North Branch Reformed Church Cemetery
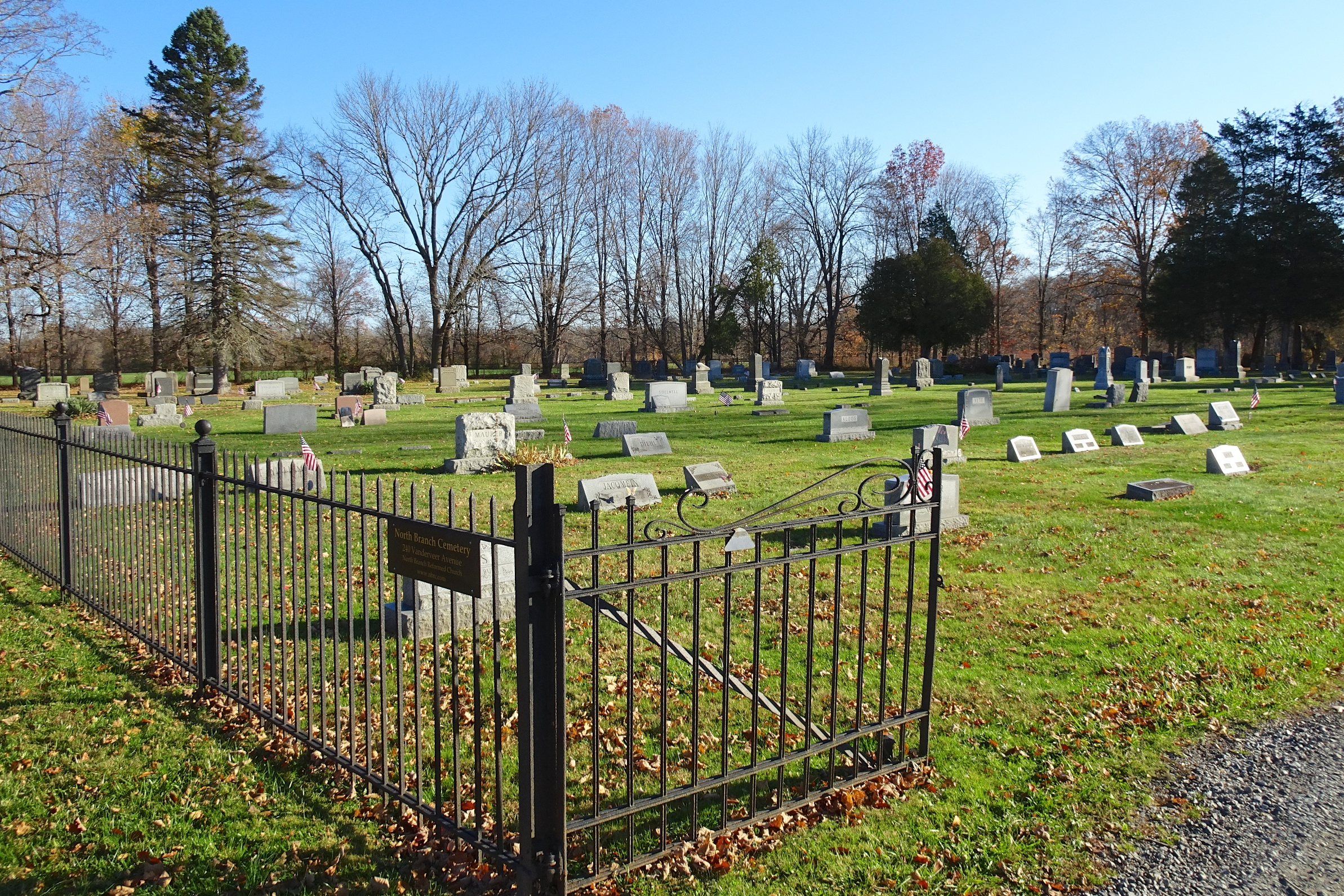
- Interactive map of North Branch Reformed Church Cemetery

Details
- Established: 1830
- Location: Vanderveer Avenue
- Find a Grave: North Branch Reformed Church Cemetery

The North Branch Reformed Church Cemetery is located nearby on the western side of the North Branch along Vanderveer Avenue. It is on the old farm of the Ten Eyck family, where about one acre was sold to the church c. 1830.

== Notable burials ==
- Jacob Ten Eyck (1693 – October 26, 1753 (aged 59–60)), son of Matthias Ten Eyck (1658–1741) from Old Hurley, Ulster County, New York
- Jacob Ten Eyck (August 25, 1733 – November 7, 1794 (aged 61)), son of Jacob Ten Eyck (1693–1753), a captain in the American Revolutionary War
- Raymond Bateman (1927–2016), Somerset County politician

== See also ==
- North Branch Historic District
- Readington Reformed Church
