= North Branch Historic District (New Jersey) =

Historic district in New Jersey, United States

- U.S. National Register of Historic Places
- U.S. Historic district
- New Jersey Register of Historic Places
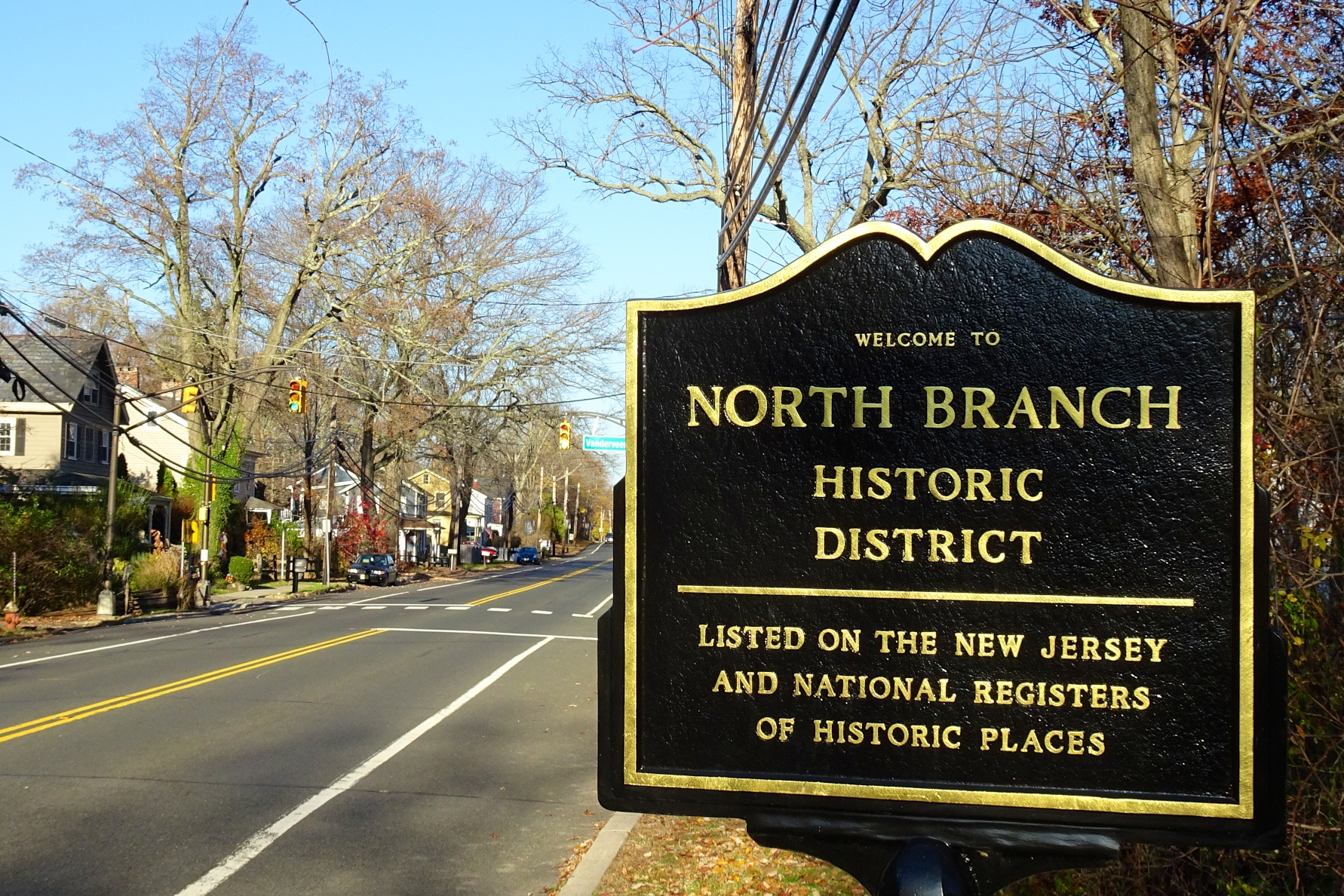

- Location within Somerset County, New Jersey Location within New Jersey Location within the United States
- Location: Easton Turnpike, Vanderveer Avenue, Burnt Mill and Station Roads; North Branch, New Jersey
- Coordinates: 40°36′10″N 74°40′42″W
- NRHP reference No.: 12000209
- NJRHP No.: 2357

Significant dates
- Added to NRHP: April 16, 2012
- Designated NJRHP: January 13, 2012

The North Branch Historic District is a historic district located in North Branch, Somerset County, New Jersey. It is on the western side of the North Branch of the Raritan River in Branchburg Township. The district reflects the 18th and 19th century architecture of this agricultural community, once built around a mill on the North Branch. A main feature is the stone house of Jacob Ten Eyck, with its Georgian influences. The district was added to the National Register of Historic Places on April 16, 2012, for its significance in architecture and community development.

== Jacob Ten Eyck house ==
In 1700, Matthias Ten Eyck (1658–1741), a farmer from Old Hurley, Ulster County, New York and son of Coenradt Ten Eyck, purchased 400 acres north of North Branch from John Johnston, and another 100 acres in 1702. In 1721, Matthias sold this property to his son Jacob Ten Eyck (1693–1753). Jacob settled here and built a 1 1/2-story stone house between 1725 and 1733. His first son Jacob Ten Eyck (1733–1794) inherited the house and later, in 1792, built a second story onto it.

== Gallery of contributing properties ==
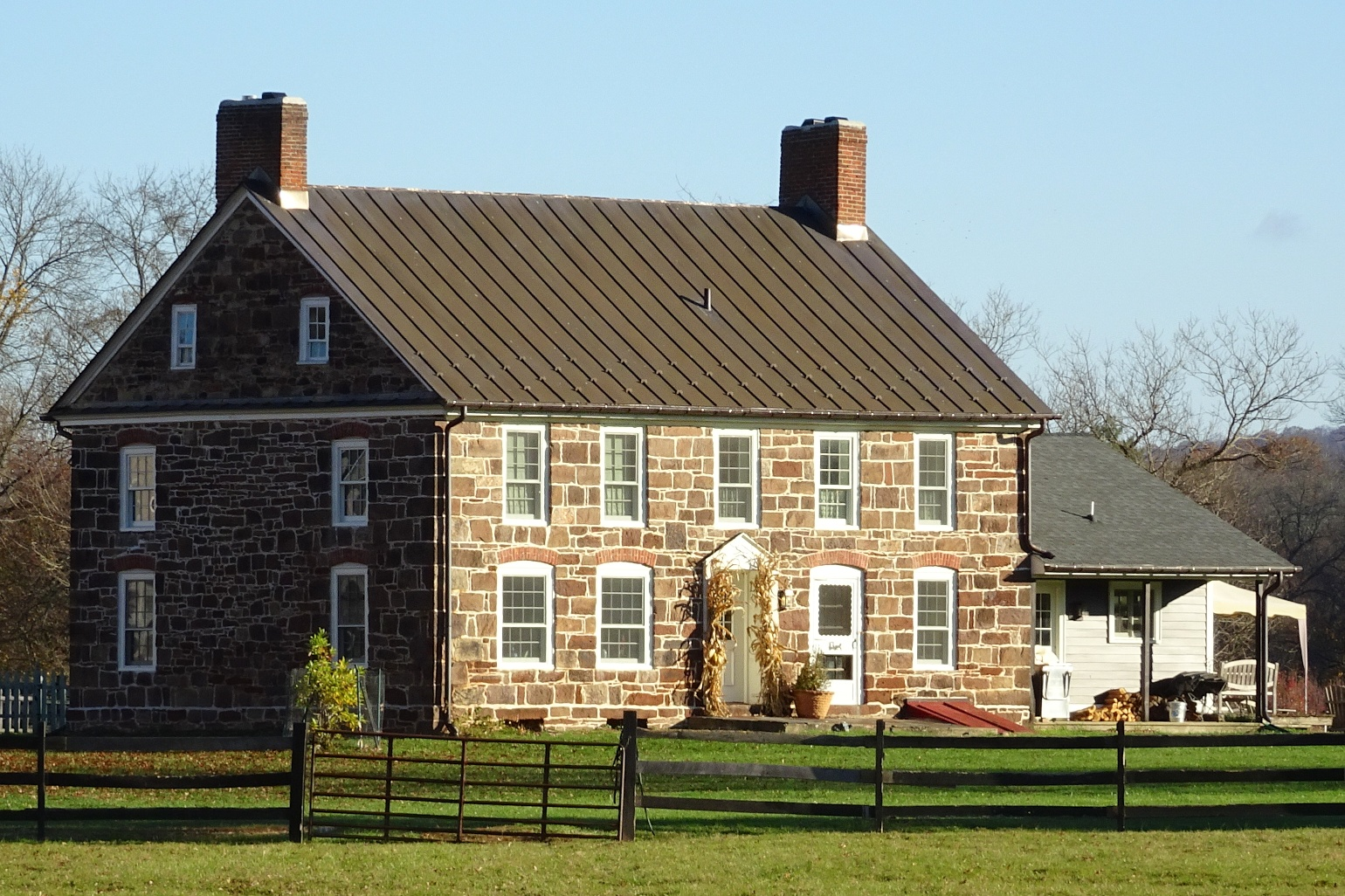
Jacob Ten Eyck house

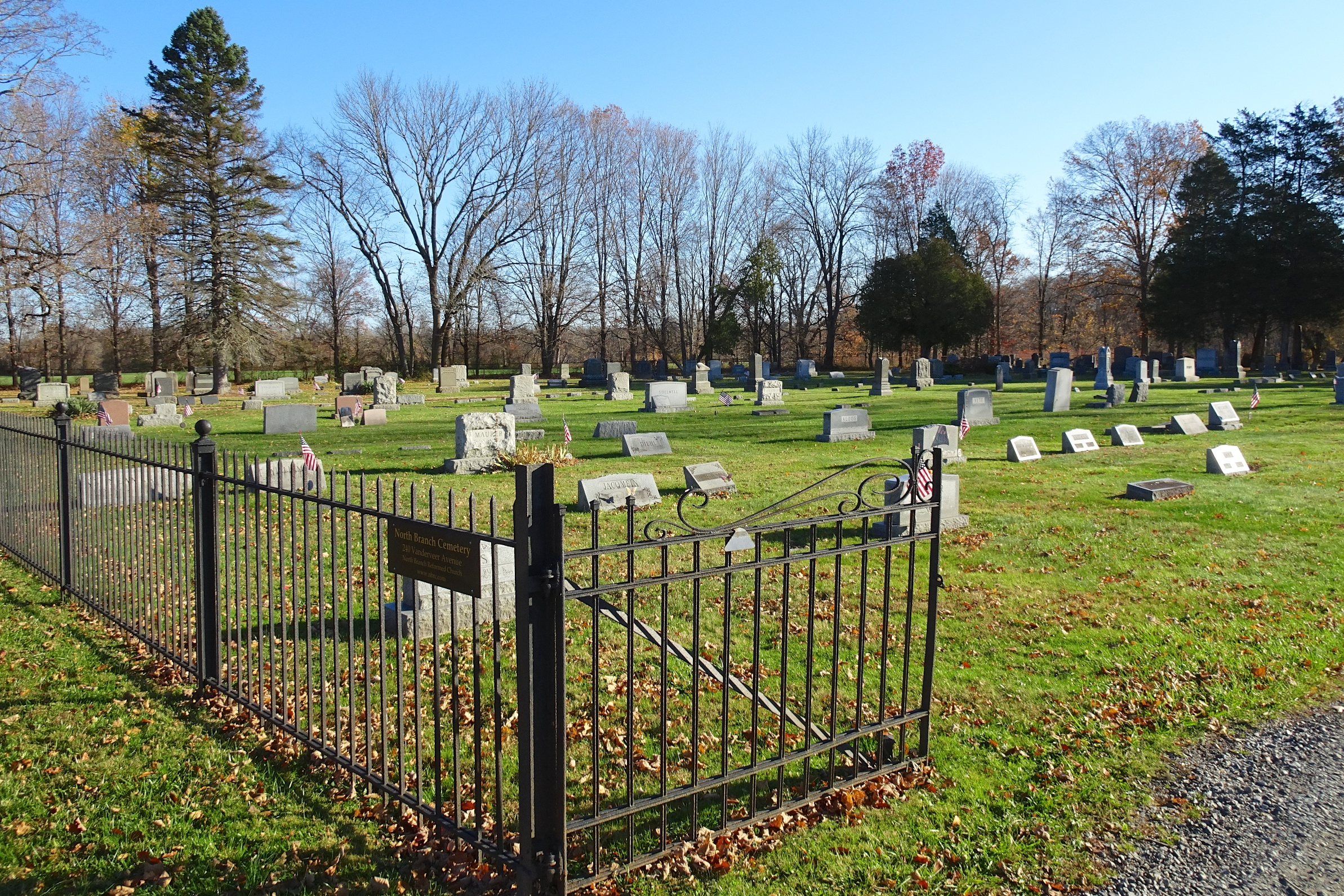
North Branch Reformed Church Cemetery

== See also ==
- National Register of Historic Places listings in Somerset County, New Jersey
