= Midland metropolitan area =

The Midland metropolitan area may refer to:

- The Midland, Texas metropolitan area, United States
- The Midland, Michigan metropolitan area, United States

== See also ==
- Midland (disambiguation)
