= Midland Airport =

Midland Airport may refer to:

== Airports ==
- Midland/Huronia Airport (CYEE), in Midland, Ontario, Canada

=== United States ===
- Jack Barstow Municipal Airport (KIKW/IKW/3BS), in Midland County. Michigan
- MBS International Airport (KMBS/MBS), the Midland-Bay City-Saginaw International Airport, in Freeland, Michigan
- Midland Airpark (KMDD/MDD), in Midland County, Texas
- Midland International Air and Space Port (KMAF/MAF), in Midland, Texas
- Midland Army Airfield, World War II-era military airfield in Midland, Texas

== See also ==
- Midland Air Museum, in Baginton, Warwickshire, England, UK
- East Midlands Airport (EGNX/EMA), in Leicestershire, England, UK
- Midway Airport (disambiguation)
- Midland (disambiguation)
