= Midway Airport (disambiguation) =

Midway International Airport (IATA: MDW) is an international airport in Chicago, Illinois, United States.

Midway Airport may also refer to:

- Henderson Field (Midway Atoll) (IATA: MDY), Midway Atoll, United States
- Henderson Field (Midway), an abandoned airfield on East Midway Island, United States
- Midway Airport (Michigan) (FAA LID: 42MI), Babcock, Michigan, United States
- Midway Aerodrome (TC LID: CBM6), Midway, British Columbia, Canada
- Mid-Way Regional Airport (ICAO: KJWY, FAA LID: JWY), Midlothian and Waxahachie, Texas, United States

== See also ==
- Midland Airport (disambiguation)
- Midway (disambiguation)
