= Daniel H. Beekman =

American jurist, banker, and politician

Judge of the Somerset County Court of Common Pleas
- In office 1913–1920
- Appointed by: Woodrow Wilson; James Fairman Fielder

Personal details
- Born: May 29, 1874 North Branch, New Jersey
- Died: February 2, 1951 (aged 76) Bound Brook, New Jersey
- Party: Democratic
- Children: 2

Daniel Henry Beekman (May 29, 1874 – February 1, 1951) was an American attorney, jurist, banker, and Democratic Party politician from Somerset County, New Jersey. He served on the Somerset County Court of Common Pleas from 1913 to 1920 and was a candidate for New Jersey Senate in the 1920s and 1930s.

== Early life and education ==
Daniel Henry Beekman was born on May 29, 1874, in North Branch, New Jersey to John Henry Beekman and Mary Elizabeth (née Lane) Beekman. His parents owned and operated a large farm in Somerset County. He was a distant relative of Wilhelmus Beekman.

He was educated at North Branch public schools and a private school in Somerville before graduating from Metz Private School for Boys in 1892. He received his legal training by reading law with Alvah A. Clark and attended a course at New York Law School, graduating in 1896. He was admitted to the bar as an attorney in June 1898 and as a counselor at law in February 1902.

== Career ==
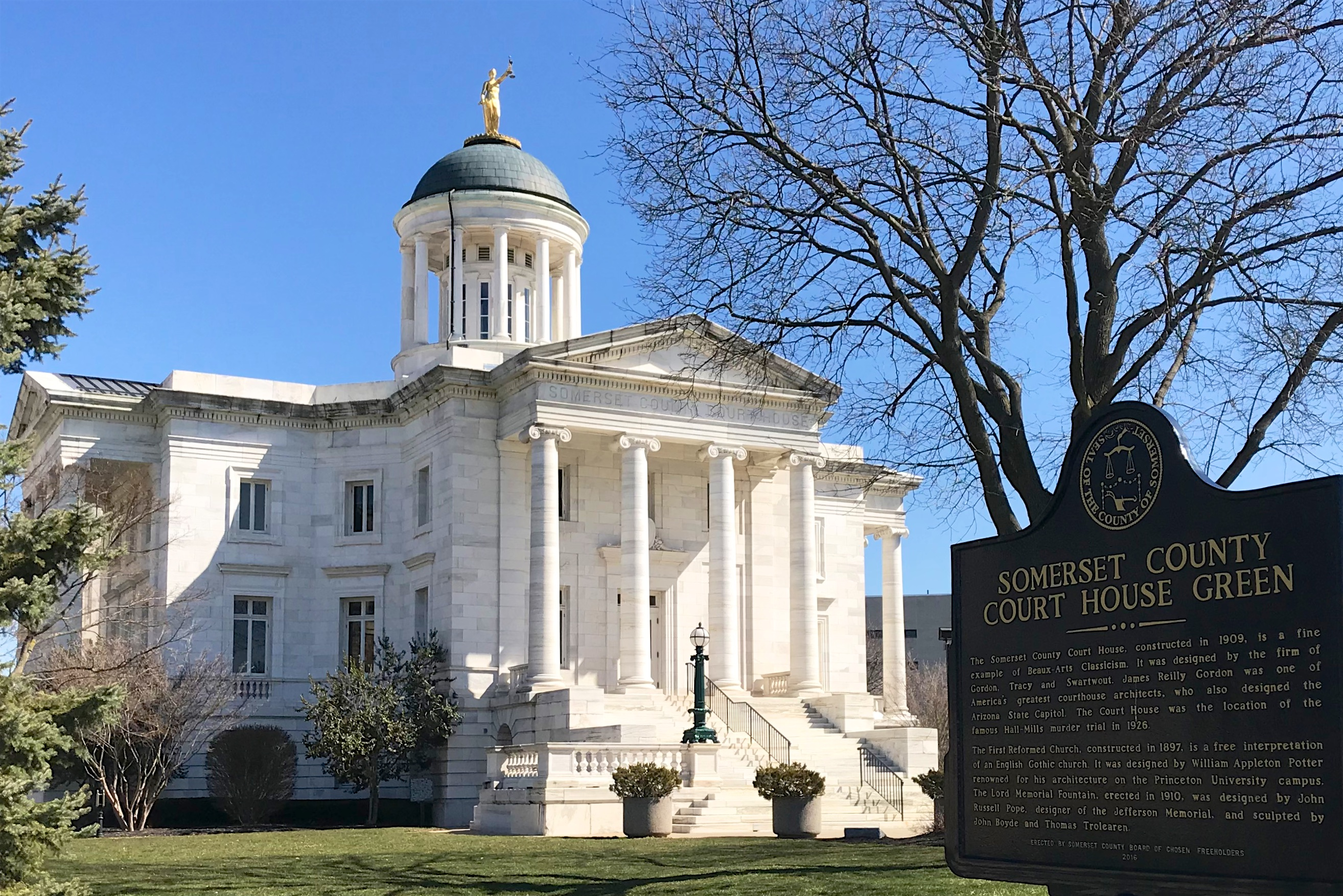
Somerset County Court House, where Beekman presided as judge from 1913 to 1920

In 1901, Beekman partnered with retired judge John D. Bartine to establish a law firm in Somerville. He practiced there until 1913, when he was appointed as a judge of the county court of common pleas by Governor Woodrow Wilson. He was reappointed by James Fairman Fielder and served until 1920, when he returned to private practice. His practice covered a range of matters, with a particular focus on real estate. Beekman's son joined his law firm in 1929, at which time the firm began operating under the name Beekman & Beekman.

Beekman was active in state Democratic politics. After serving as judge, he ran for state senate in multiple elections in the late 1920s and early 1930s. During World War II, Beekman served as chairman of the local Selective Service Board. He sat on the Board of Managers of the New Jersey Reformatory for Women at Clinton.

Following his tenure as judge, Beekman returned to his law firm and served as an executive of the Second National Bank of Somerville. He helped lead the bank through the Great Depression. Beekman credited Franklin Roosevelt's swift action after taking office in 1933 with saving the banking system and ultimately stabilizing markets. In 1937, Beekman was elected president of Second National Bank, a position he held until his death.

== Personal life ==
Beekman married Emetta Hoffmann on November 15, 1899 in Oldwick, New Jersey. They had two children: John Henry Jr. (b. October 27, 1903) and Mabel Elizabeth (b. August 23, 1909). John Jr. served as Somerset County Prosecutor and president of the Somerset County Bar Association. Mabel graduated the Yale School of Nursing and served as a supervisor in the New Jersey Department of Health.

Beekman was a deacon and elder of the First Reformed Church of Somerville and a member of Raritan Valley Country Club, the Bachelors Club, the Somerville Athletic Association, and the Freemasons.

He died at Bound Brook Hospital on February 2, 1951.
