= Frank Tatlow =

General manager Midlands Railway

Frank Tatlow CBE (1861–1934) was general manager of the Midland Railway from 1918 to 1922.

== Career ==
His career started in April 1875 when he entered the general manager's office of the Midland Railway at Derby. In 1903 he was made assistant-general manager, replacing T.W. Wells who had been promoted to general traffic superintendent. In 1908 he became parliamentary assistant to the general manager, and in 1915 Assistant general manager.

He was made a Commander of the Order of the British Empire in the 1918 New Year Honours.

On the retirement of Guy Granet he succeeded to the position of general manager towards the end of 1918.

After retirement from the Midland Railway on 31 December 1918 he was appointed a member of the Northern Counties Committee in Ireland, and a director representing the London, Midland and Scottish Railway (LMS) on the Cheshire Lines Committee. In 1925 he was appointed as a consultant to the general manager and to the board of the LMS.

He was also a chairman of Carpet Trades Limited, G.R. Turner Limited, a director of the British Soda Company Limited, from 1924 the Staveley Coal and Iron Company Limited and the Yorkshire Main Colliery (1923) Limited.

== Life ==
He was born on 9 June 1861, the son of Joseph Tatlow (1828–1885) and Elizabeth Needham (1827–1912).

He married Elizabeth Hough (1861–1939) in 1883. They had two daughters:

- Ethel Tatlow (1883–1972)
- Lily Tatlow (born 1888)

He was chairman of the Chevin Golf Club, and of the Royal Portrush Golf Club. He was also a member of the Derbyshire Cricket Club.

He died on 13 March 1934 in his house, St Oswald's, Castle Hill, Duffield, Derbyshire.

Business positions
Preceded by Guy Granet	General Manager of the Midland Railway; 1918–1922	Succeeded by Defunct
