= Midland station (South Dakota) =

U.S. railroad depot in South Dakota

Midland
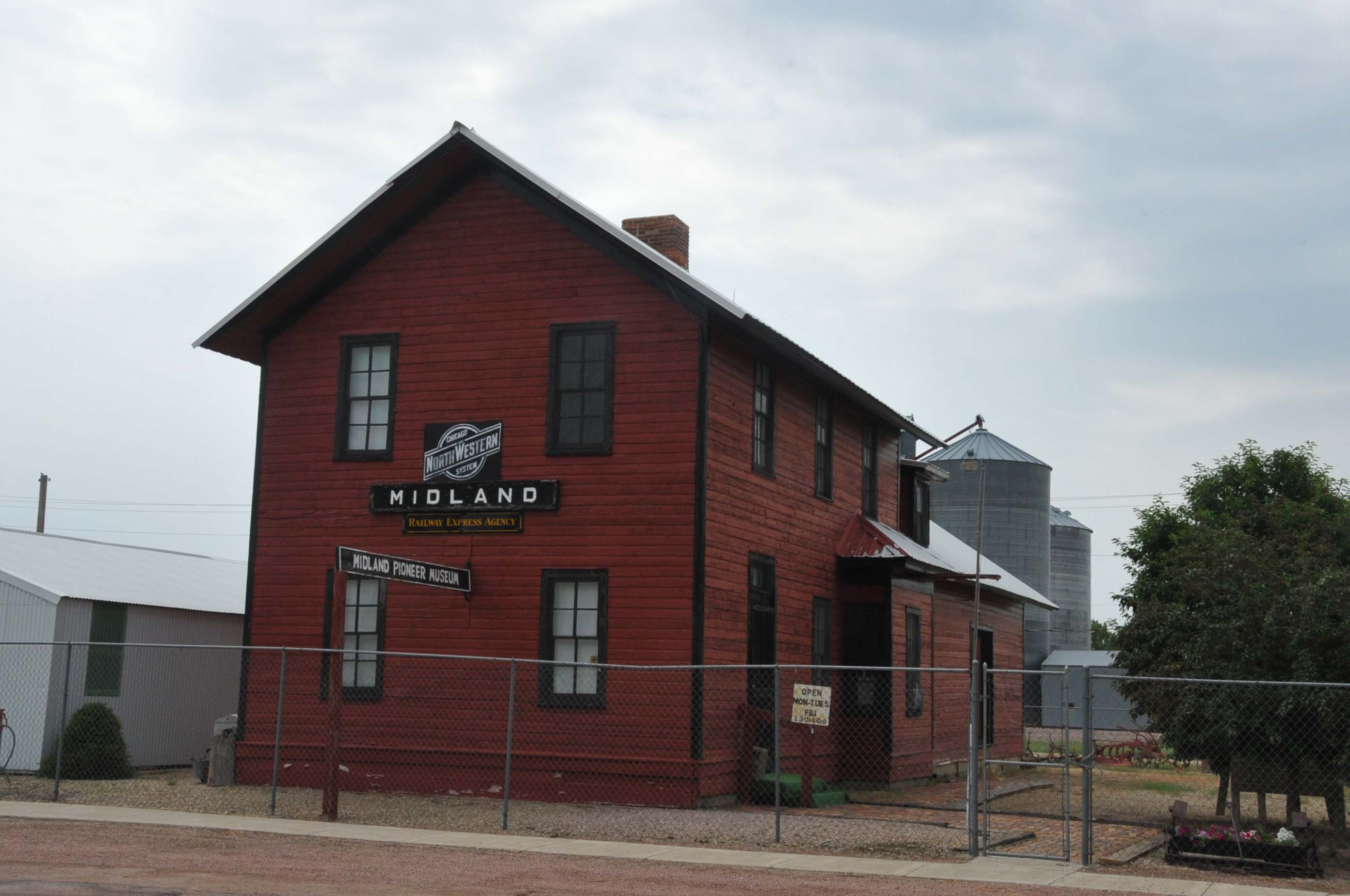
- Midland depot (2013)

General information
- Location: 400 block of Main Street, Midland, South Dakota
- Coordinates: 44°04′14″N 101°09′23″W
- System: Former Chicago and North Western Railway passenger rail station

History
- Opened: 1907
- Closed: October 24, 1960

Former services
Preceding station	Chicago and North Western Railway	Following station
Nowlin toward Lead	Elroy – Lead	Capa toward Elroy
- Midland Depot
- U.S. National Register of Historic Places
- Location within South Dakota
- Location: 400 block of Main St; Midland, South Dakota
- Coordinates: 44°04′14″N 101°09′23″W
- Built: 1907
- NRHP reference No.: 100004621
- Added to NRHP: November 18, 2019
Location

The Midland Depot was built by the Chicago and North Western Railway (C&NW) in 1907 as part of an extension from Pierre to Rapid City. It is located on Main Street in Midland, South Dakota. The building is a two-story wooden depot, built to the C&NWs' plan number 4 design, of a standard combination depot with living rooms overhead. In 1939, the Midland Depot had a single daily departure in each direction, to Chicago or Rapid City via the Minnesota & Black Hills Express. Passenger service ended October 24, 1960, with the discontinuance of the Dakota 400. Today the depot houses the Pioneer Museum.

The depot was listed in the National Register of Historic Places in 2019 because of its architecture and also because of its association with the development of Midland.
