= Midland City =

Midland City may refer to:

== Places in the United States ==
- Midland City, Alabama
- Central Heights-Midland City, Arizona
  - Midland City, Arizona
- Midland City, Illinois

== Fiction ==
- Midland City, Ohio, the fictional setting of Kurt Vonnegut's novels, including Breakfast of Champions and Deadeye Dick

== See also ==
- Midland (disambiguation)
