= Waddell Block =

- U.S. National Register of Historic Places
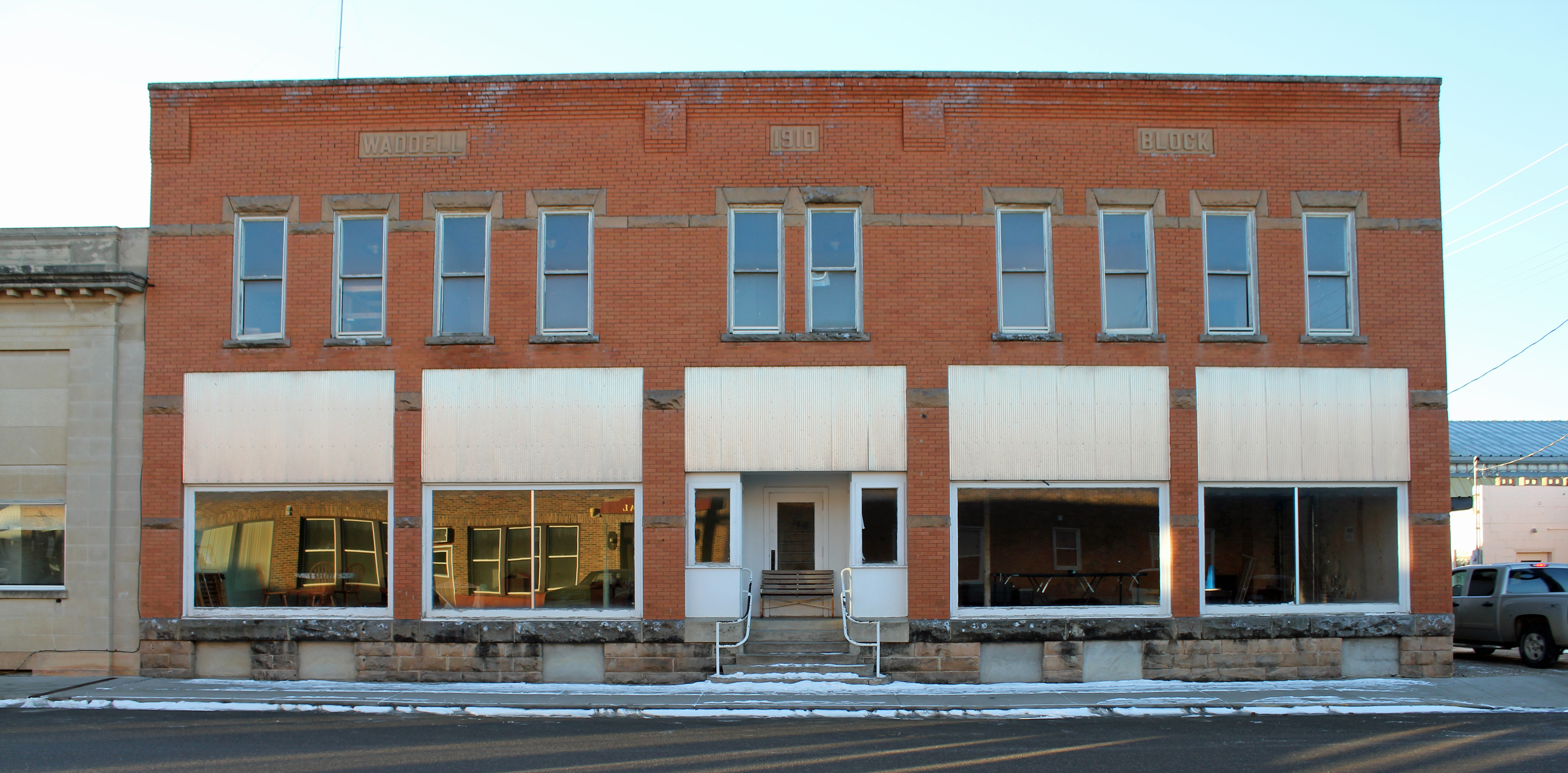

- Location within South Dakota Location within the United States
- Location: E. Pine St., Philip, South Dakota
- Coordinates: 44.0393°N 101.6645°W
- Area: less than one acre
- Built: 1910
- Architectural style: Early Commercial
- NRHP reference No.: 10000049
- Added to NRHP: February 24, 2010

The Waddell Block is a historic commercial building on Lot 1, Block 7 (Pine Street) in Philip, South Dakota, United States. Built in 1910, it is the oldest masonry structure in Philip, and one of the few buildings to survive a devastating fire that destroyed most of the community's business district in 1920. It is a fairly typical early-20th-century commercial brick structure, two stories in height, with storefronts on the first floor and office space on the second.

The building was listed on the National Register of Historic Places in 2010.

== See also ==
- National Register of Historic Places listings in Haakon County, South Dakota
