= Guy Granet =

Sir Guy Granet GBE
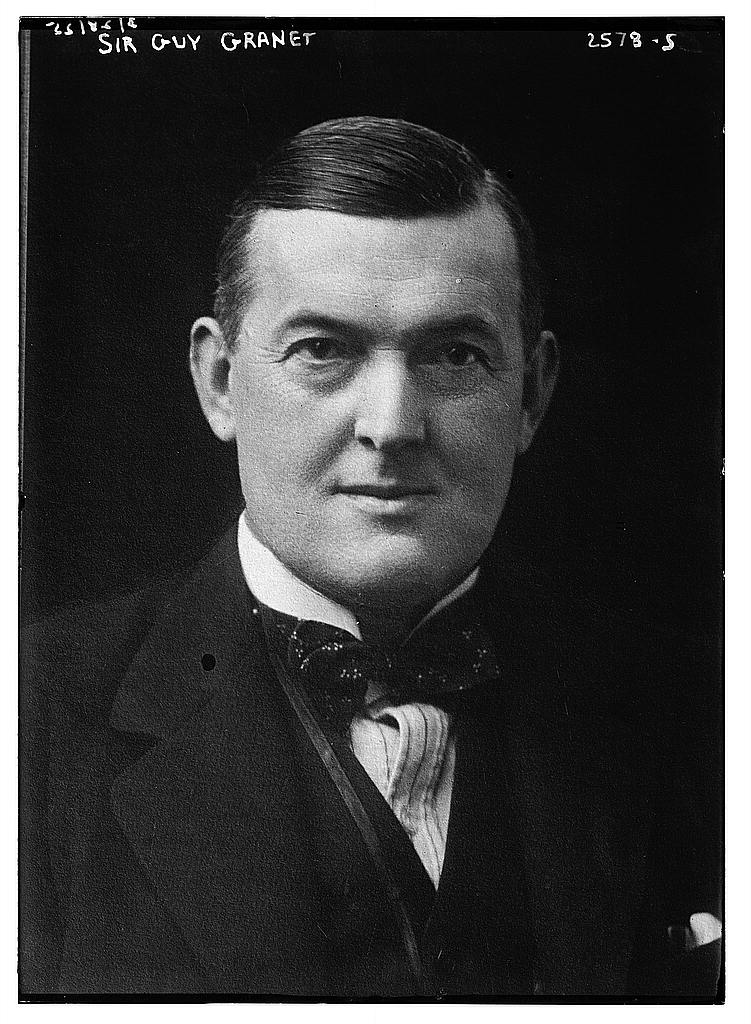
- Sir Guy Granet, circa 1910–1915
- Born: William Guy Granet; 13 October 1867; Genoa, Italy
- Died: 11 October 1943 (aged 75); Burleigh Court, near Stroud, Gloucestershire
- Education: Rugby School; Balliol College, Oxford
- Occupations: Barrister, railway manager
- Known for: General manager, Midland Railway; chairman, London, Midland and Scottish Railway
- Spouse: Florence Gully
- Children: 1, Diana
- Parent: William Augustus Granet Adelaide Julia Le Mesurier

Sir William Guy Granet (13 October 1867 – 11 October 1943) was a British railwayman. Trained as a barrister, he became a noted railway administrator, first as general manager of the Midland Railway then as a director-general in the War Office.

== Biography ==
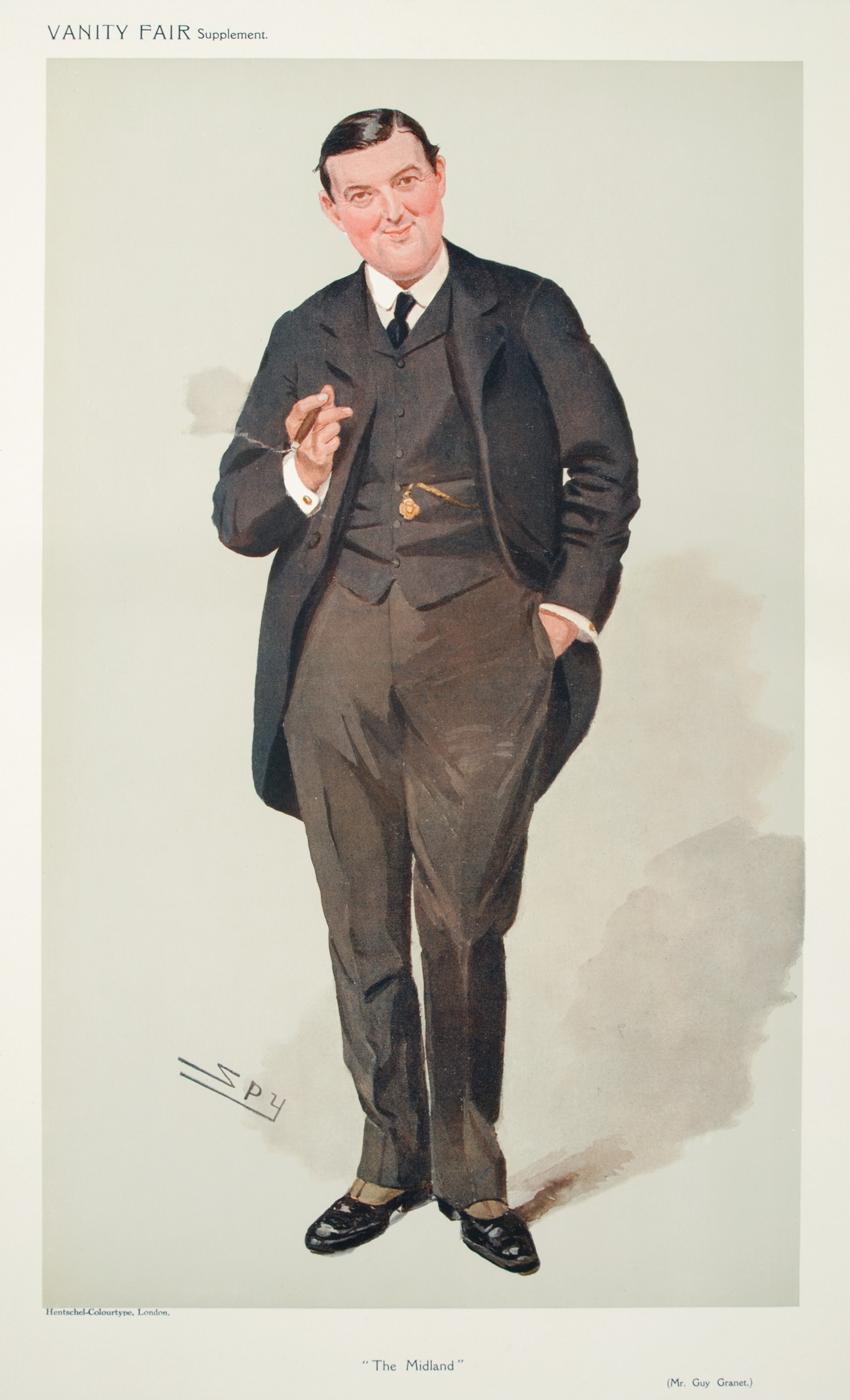
Granet caricatured by Spy for Vanity Fair, 1908

Guy Granet was the second son of William Augustus Granet and his wife Adelaide Julia Granet, née Le Mesurier. He was born in Genoa, where his father was a banker. His elder brother was British army officer Edward John Granet. He was educated at Rugby School and Balliol College, Oxford (Modern History, 1889), and was called to the bar in 1893 at Lincoln's Inn.

In 1892 he married Florence Gully, daughter of William Court Gully (later Viscount Selby). They had one child, Diana, who married the novelist Denis Mackail.

Granet moved into railway management after holding the post of secretary to the Railway Companies' Association from 1900 to 1905. He was appointed assistant general manager of the Midland Railway (MR) in 1905 and became its general manager the following year, on the resignation of John Mathieson. This was very unusual at that time, when managers almost always rose through the ranks of railway operators. Over the ensuing eight years his organisational skills, and the analytic brain of his appointee as general superintendent, Cecil Paget, effected a revolution in the company's ability to handle its heavy freight traffic expeditiously and profitably. Nonetheless, their 'traffic control' solution resulted in stifling locomotive development within the MR: the departure of chief mechanical engineer R. M. Deeley has been attributed to Granet's rejection of his moves to introduce 8-coupled freight locomotives and de Glehn 4-6-0s for express passenger use.

Having impressed parliamentary committees as an expert witness, it was natural that Granet would be called upon by the government during World War I, and he was successively: controller of import restrictions; deputy director of military railways at the War Office; and director-general of movements and railways.

Granet retained his MR appointment until 1918, when he resigned and was given a seat on the company's board. At the grouping in 1923 he became deputy chairman of the new London, Midland and Scottish Railway Company and was its chairman 1924–1927. As at the Midland, his appointee, this time Sir Josiah Stamp as president (chairman and chief executive), was crucial in the modernisation of the company's management.

Granet was knighted in 1911 as a Knight Bachelor and appointed a Knight Grand Cross of the Order of the British Empire (GBE) in the 1923 Birthday Honours. He died at Burleigh Court, near Stroud, Gloucestershire, two days before his 76th birthday, after some five years of ill health.

Granet is the great-great uncle of the French author and publisher François Granet.

== Sources ==
- Alderman, Geoffrey, The railway interest, Leicester, Leicester University Press, 1973, ISBN 0-7185-1111-5
- Hartley, Harold, 'Granet, Sir (William) Guy', in The dictionary of national biography, 1941-1950, London : OUP, 1959
- 'Sir Guy Granet' [obituary] The Times, 12 October 1943, p. 6e
- 'Granet, Sir (Wm.) Guy' in Who was who, vol.4 : 1941-1950, London : Black, [early 1950s?]

Business positions
Preceded by John Mathieson	General Manager of the Midland Railway; 1906–1918	Succeeded by Frank Tatlow
Preceded by Charles Lawrence, 1st Baron Lawrence of Kingsgate	Chairman of the London, Midland and Scottish Railway; 1924–1927	Succeeded by Sir Josiah Stamp as Chairman and President
