= Midland Hotel =

Midland Hotel is the name of several English hotels. Many were former railway hotels constructed by the Midland Railway. It may refer to:

- Midland Hotel, Manchester
- Midland Hotel, Birmingham, now managed by Macdonald Hotels as Macdonald Burlington Hotel.
- Midland Hotel, Bradford
- Midland Hotel, Derby, also known as Hallmark Hotel Derby Midland
- Midland Hotel, Morecambe (1933 – present)
  - Midland Hotel, Morecambe (1871–1932), originally named North Western Hotel, Morecambe (1848–1871)
- Midland Grand Hotel at St Pancras station, London, now known as St Pancras Renaissance London Hotel
- Midland Hotel, adjacent to Mansfield railway station, Nottinghamshire
- The Midland Hotel, Chicago, a historic 1927 hotel in Chicago, Illinois, United States
