= Midland High School =

Midland High School can refer to one of the following high schools:

- Midland High School (Fremont, Nebraska), private school
- Midland High School (Arkansas), public high school in Pleasant Plains, Arkansas
- Midland High School (Illinois) in Varna, Illinois
- Midland High School (Louisiana) in Midland, Louisiana
- Midland High School (Michigan), public high school in Midland, Michigan
- Midland High School (Midland, Texas), public high school in Midland, Texas
- Midland High School (South Dakota) in Midland, South Dakota

"Midland" is also found in the name of several other high schools:

- Cabell Midland High School, a public high school in Ona, West Virginia
- Midland-Richard Milburn Alternative School in Midland, Texas
- Midland Community High School in Wyoming, Iowa
- Midland Excel Campus School in Midland, Texas
- Midland Park High School in Midland Park, New Jersey
- Midland School, Los Olivos, California
- Midland Trail High School, a public high school in Hico, West Virginia
- Midland Valley High School in Langley, South Carolina
