= Midlands (disambiguation) =

The Midlands is the central region of England.

Midlands may also refer to:

== Places ==
=== Africa ===
- Midlands, Mauritius
- Midlands of KwaZulu-Natal, South Africa
- Midlands Province, Zimbabwe

=== Europe ===
- Midlands Region, Ireland
- Central Belt, Scotland; formerly known as Scottish Midlands
- Vidzeme, Latvia

=== Elsewhere ===
- Midlands (Louisville, Kentucky), United States
- Midlands (Tasmania), Australia
- Midlands of South Carolina, United States

== Other uses ==
- Midlands (women's field hockey team), in New Zealand

== See also ==
- Swiss Plateau, Switzerland
- Midland Valley (disambiguation)
- Midland (disambiguation)
