= Midland Railway =

British pre-grouping railway company (1844–1922)

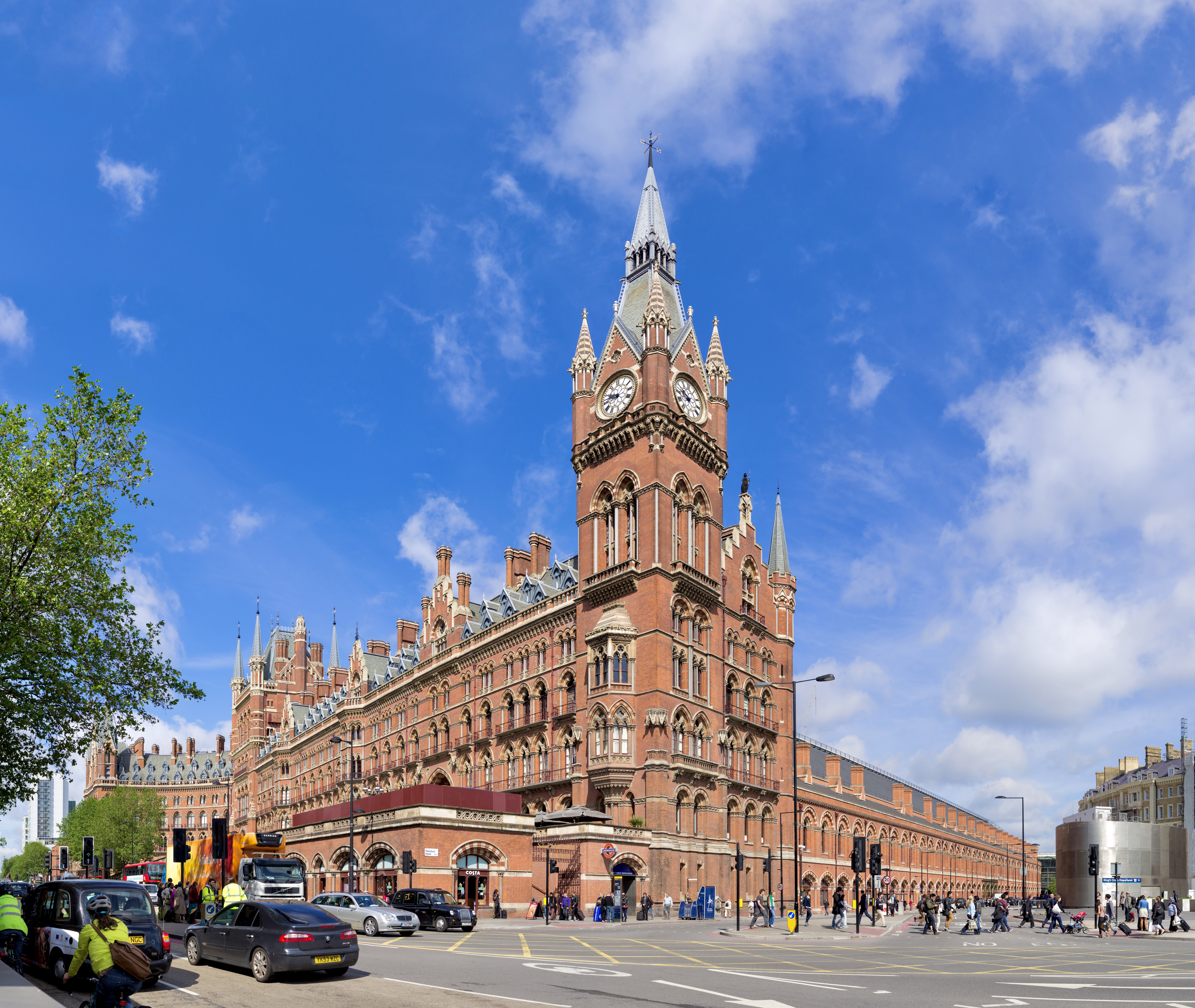
- The Midland Grand Hotel at St Pancras station, the London terminus of the Midland Railway in June 2012

Overview
- Headquarters: Derby
- Locale: England and Wales
- Dates of operation: 10 May 1844–31 December 1922
- Predecessor: Midland Counties Rly, North Midland Rly, Birmingham and Derby Junction Rly
- Successor: London, Midland and Scottish Railway

Technical
- Track gauge: 4 ft 8 1/2 in (1,435 mm) standard gauge
- Length: 2,170 miles 22 chains (3,492.7 km) (1919) (Note: Includes all railways owned, leased or worked by the company, including those in Ireland)
- Track length: 6,625 miles 48 chains (10,662.9 km) (1919)

The Midland Railway (MR) was a railway company in the United Kingdom from 1844. The Midland was one of the largest railway companies in Britain in the early 20th century, and the largest employer in Derby, where it had its headquarters. It amalgamated with several other railways to create the London, Midland and Scottish Railway at grouping in 1923.

The Midland had a large network of lines emanating from Derby, stretching to London St Pancras, Manchester, Carlisle, Birmingham, and Bristol. It expanded as much through acquisitions as by building its own lines. It also operated ships from Heysham in Lancashire to Douglas and Belfast. A large amount of the Midland's infrastructure remains in use and visible, such as the Midland Main Line and the Settle–Carlisle line, and some of its railway hotels still bear the name Midland Hotel.

== History ==
=== Origins ===
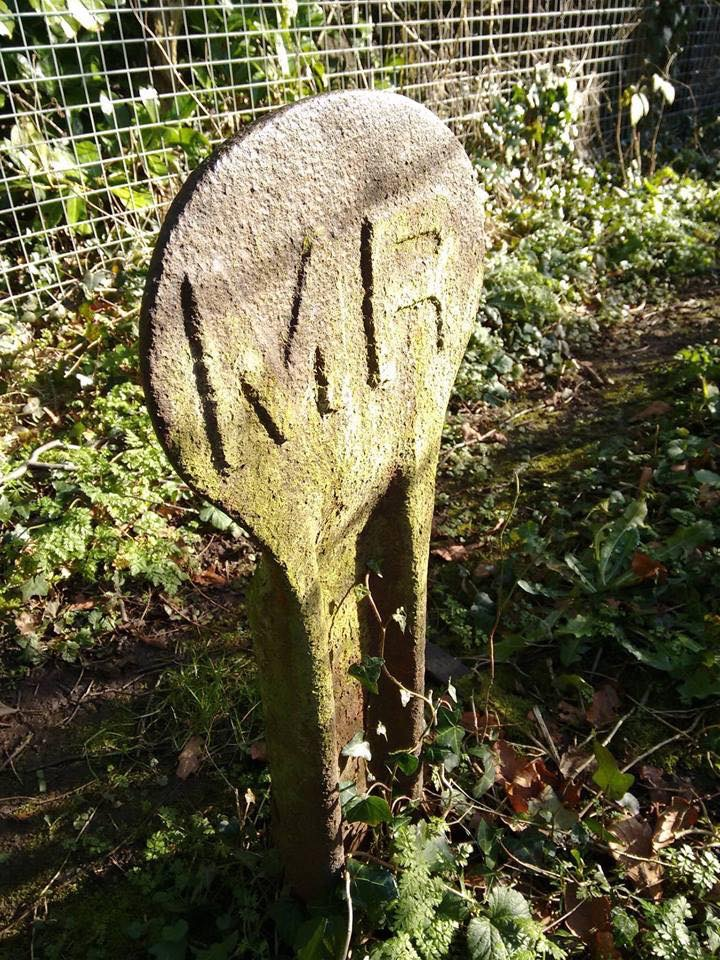
Midland Railway boundary marker at Sutton Bonington, Nottinghamshire, July 2019

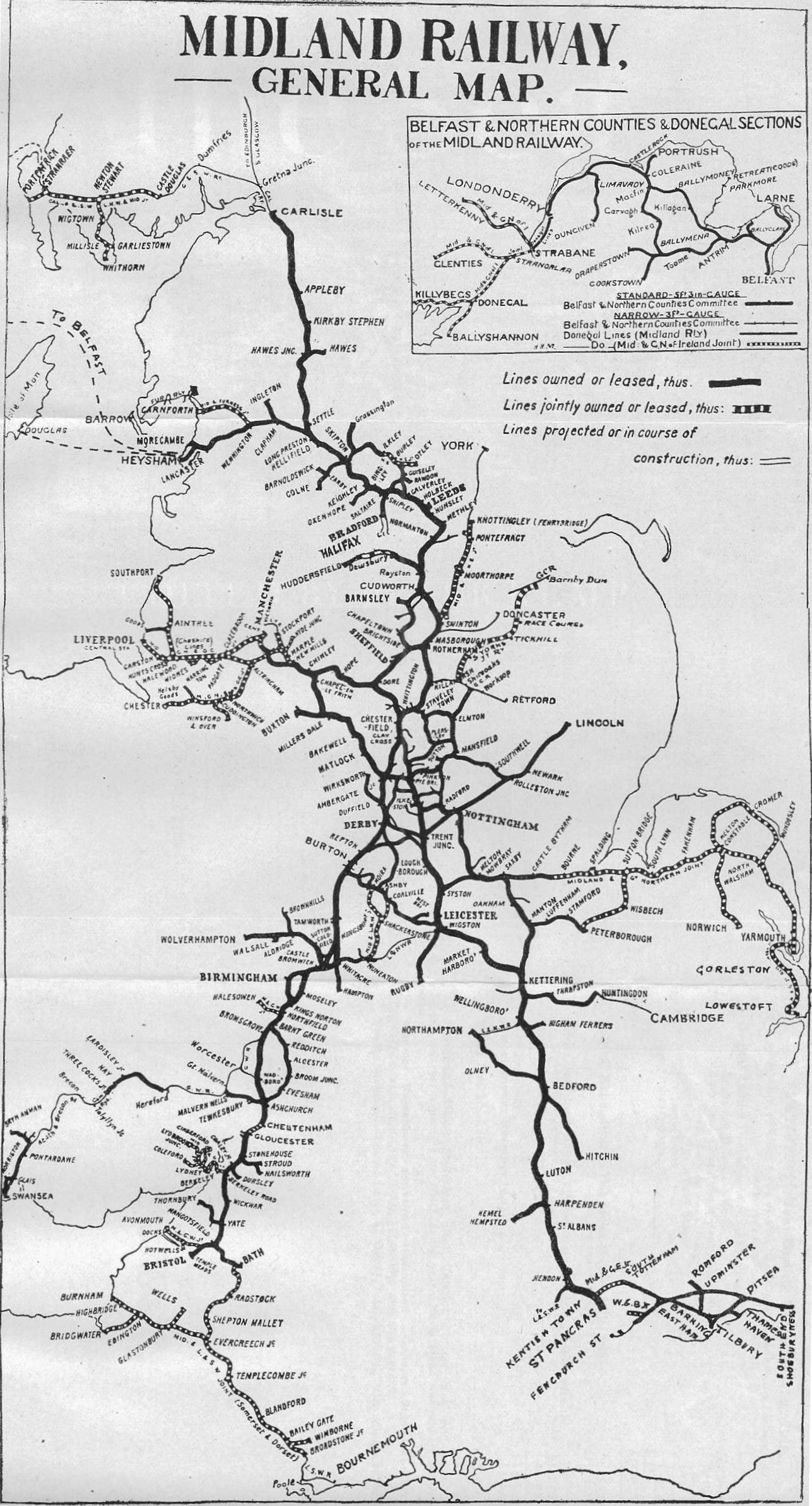
1920 general map of Midland Railway

The Midland Railway originated from 1832 in Leicestershire / Nottinghamshire, with the purpose of serving the needs of local coal owners.

Midland Railway Consolidation Act 1844
- Act of Parliament
- Parliament of the United Kingdom
- Long title: An Act to consolidate the North Midland, Midland Counties, and Birmingham and Derby Junction Railways.
- Citation: 7 & 8 Vict. c. xviii
- Territorial extent: United Kingdom

Dates
- Royal assent: 10 May 1844
- Commencement: 10 May 1844 (Note: The Acts of Parliament (Commencement) Act 1793.)
- Repealed: 6 July 1895
Other legislation
Repealed by	Midland Railway Act 1895

Status: Repealed

The company was formed on 10 May 1844 by the Midland Railway Consolidation Act 1844 (7 & 8 Vict. c. xviii) which merged the Midland Counties Railway, the North Midland Railway, and the Birmingham and Derby Junction Railway, the Birmingham and Gloucester Railway joined two years later. These met at the Tri-Junct station at Derby, where the MR established its locomotive and later its carriage and wagon works.

Leading it were George Hudson from the North Midland, and John Ellis from the Midland Counties. James Allport from the Birmingham and Derby Junction Railway found a place elsewhere in Hudson's empire with the York, Newcastle and Berwick Railway, though he later returned.

The MR was in a commanding position having its Derby headquarters at the junctions of the two main routes from London to Scotland, by its connections to the London and Birmingham Railway in the south, and from York via the York and North Midland Railway in the north.

=== Consolidation ===
Almost immediately it took over the Sheffield and Rotherham Railway and the Erewash Valley Line in 1845, the latter giving access to the Nottinghamshire and Derbyshire coalfields. It absorbed the Mansfield and Pinxton Railway in 1847, extending the Erewash Valley Line from the latter between Chesterfield and Trent Junction at Long Eaton, completed to Chesterfield in 1862, giving access to the coalfields that became its major source of income. Passengers from Sheffield continued to use Rotherham Masborough until a direct route was completed in 1870.

Meanwhile, it extended its influence into the Leicestershire coalfields, by buying the Leicester and Swannington Railway in 1846, and extending it to Burton in 1849.

=== The South-West ===
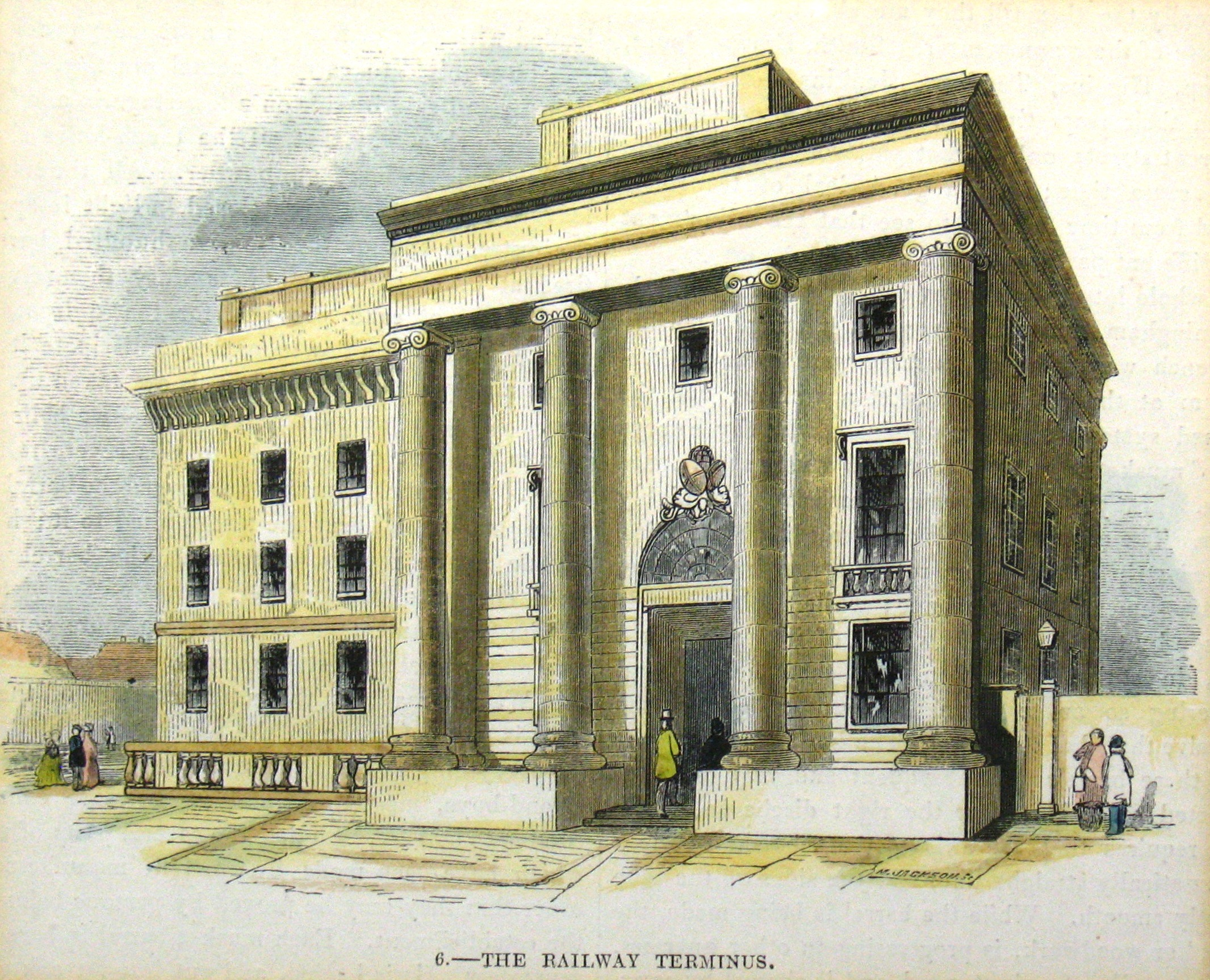
1840 print of Curzon Street railway station in Birmingham

After the merger, London trains were carried on the shorter Midland Counties route. The former Birmingham and Derby Junction Railway was left with the traffic to Birmingham and Bristol, an important seaport. The original 1839 line from Derby had run to Hampton-in-Arden: the Birmingham and Derby Junction Railway had built a terminus at Lawley Street in 1842, and on 1 May 1851 the MR started to run into Curzon Street.

The line south was the Birmingham and Bristol Railway, which reached Curzon Street via Camp Hill. These two lines had been formed by the merger of the standard gauge Birmingham and Gloucester Railway and the broad gauge Bristol and Gloucester Railway.

They met at Gloucester via a short loop of the Cheltenham and Great Western Union Railway. The change of gauge at Gloucester meant that everything had to be transferred between trains, creating chaos, and the C&GWU was owned by the Great Western Railway, which wished to extend its network by taking over the Bristol to Birmingham route. While the two parties were bickering over the price, the MR's John Ellis overheard two directors of the Birmingham and Bristol Railway on a London train discussing the business, and pledged that the MR would match anything the Great Western would offer.

Since it would have brought broad gauge into Curzon Street with the possibility of extending it to the Mersey, it was something that the other standard gauge lines wished to avoid, and they pledged to assist the MR with any losses it might incur. In the event all that was necessary was for the later LNWR to share Birmingham New Street with the Midland when it was opened in 1854, and Lawley Street became a goods depot.

=== Eastern competition ===
The MR controlled all the traffic to the North East and Scotland from London. The LNWR was progressing slowly through the Lake District, and there was pressure for a direct line from London to York. Permission had been gained for the Northern and Eastern Railway to run through Peterborough and Lincoln but it had barely reached Cambridge.

Two obvious extensions of the Midland Counties line were from Nottingham to Lincoln and from Leicester to Peterborough. They had not been proceeded with, but Hudson saw that they would make ideal "stoppers": if the cities concerned were provided with a rail service, it would make it more difficult to justify another line. They were approved while the bill for the direct line was still before Parliament, forming the present day Lincoln Branch and the Syston to Peterborough Line.

The Leeds and Bradford Railway had been approved in 1844. By 1850 it was losing money but a number of railways offered to buy it. Hudson made an offer more or less on his own account and the line gave the MR an exit to the north, which became the start of the Settle and Carlisle line, and it gave the MR a much more convenient station at Leeds Wellington.

In spite of the objections of Hudson, for the MR and others, the "London and York Railway" (later the Great Northern Railway) led by Edmund Denison persisted, and the bill passed through Parliament in 1846.

=== The Battle of Nottingham ===
In 1851 the Ambergate, Nottingham, Boston and Eastern Junction Railway completed its line from Grantham as far as Colwick, from where a branch led to the MR Nottingham station. The Great Northern Railway by then passed through Grantham and both railway companies paid court to the fledgling line. Meanwhile, Nottingham had woken up to its branch line status and was keen to expand. The MR made a takeover offer only to discover that a shareholder of the GN had already gathered a quantity of Ambergate shares. An attempt to amalgamate the line with the GN was foiled by Ellis, who managed to obtain an Order in Chancery preventing the GN from running into Nottingham. However, in 1851 it opened a new service to the north that included Nottingham.

In 1852 an ANB&EJR train arrived in Nottingham with a GN locomotive at its head. When it uncoupled and went to run round the train, it found its way blocked by a MR engine while another blocked its retreat. The engine was shepherded to a nearby shed and the tracks were lifted. This episode became known as the "Battle of Nottingham" and, with the action moved to the courtroom, it was seven months before the locomotive was released.

=== The Euston Square Confederacy ===
The London and Birmingham Railway and its successor the London and North Western Railway had been under pressure from two directions. Firstly the Great Western Railway had been foiled in its attempt to enter Birmingham by the Midland, but it still had designs on Manchester. At the same time the LNWR was under threat from the GN's attempts to enter Manchester by the Manchester, Sheffield and Lincolnshire Railway.

=== To London ===
==== King's Cross 1857–1868 ====
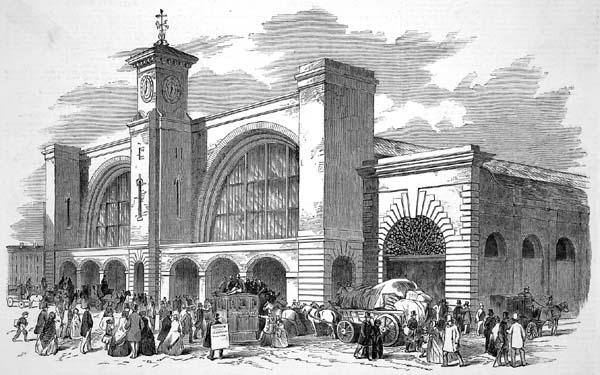
An illustration of King's Cross station from 1852, shortly before its use by the Midland Railway

In 1850 the MR, though much more secure, was still a provincial line. Ellis realised that if it were to fend off its competitors it must expand outwards. The first step, in 1853, was to appoint James Allport as general manager, and the next was to shake off the dependence on the LNWR to London.

Although a bill for a line from Hitchin into King's Cross jointly with the GN, was passed as the Midland Railways (Extension to Hitchin, Northampton and Huntingdon Railway) Act 1847 (10 & 11 Vict. c. cxxxv) it had not been proceeded with.

Midland Railway (Leicester and Hitchin) Act 1853 (Note: Section 65.)
- Act of Parliament
- Parliament of the United Kingdom
- Long title: An Act to enable the Midland Railway Company to make a Line of Railway from near Leicester to the Great Northern Railway near Hitchin, with a Branch, in lieu of the Line of Railway and Branches authorized by "The Midland Railways Extension to Hitchin, Northampton, and Huntingdon Railway Act, 1847," and "The Midland Railways Extension to Hitchin, Northampton, and Huntingdon Railway (Wellingborough Deviations) Act, 1848."
- Citation: 16 & 17 Vict. c. cviii
- Territorial extent: United Kingdom

Dates
- Royal assent: 4 August 1853
- Commencement: 4 August 1853 (Note: Section 1.)
Other legislation
Repeals/revokes	Midland Railways (Extension to Hitchin, Northampton and Huntingdon Railway) Act 1847; Midland Railway's Extension to Hitchin, Northampton and Huntingdon Railway (Wellingborough Deviations) Act 1848
Amended by	Statute Law (Repeals) Act 1995

Status: Amended

Text of statute as originally enacted

The bill was resubmitted in 1853 with the support of the people of Bedford, whose branch to the LNWR was slow and unreliable, and with the knowledge of the Northamptonshire iron deposits. It was passed as the Midland Railway (Leicester and Hitchin) Act 1853 (16 & 17 Vict. c. cviii).

The Leicester and Hitchin Railway ran from Wigston to Market Harborough, through Desborough, Kettering, Wellingborough and Bedford, then on the Bedford to Hitchin Line, joining the GN at Hitchin for King's Cross. The line began its life in a proposition presented for the shareholders by George Hudson on 2 May 1842 as: "To vest £600,000 in the South Midland Railway Company in their line from Wigston to Hitchin." a full decade before realisation. The delay was partly due to the withdrawal of GN's interest in the competing scheme, the Bedford and Leicester Railway, after Midland purchased the Leicester and Swannington Railway and the Ashby Canal and Tramway, which were to have been the feeder lines. With the competition thwarted there was less rush to have this line as well as its branch lines to Huntingdon (from Kettering) and Northampton (from Bedford) finished. Both these branches were subsequently built by independent companies.

While this took some of the pressure off the route through Rugby, the GNR insisted that passengers for London alight at Hitchin, buying tickets in the short time available, to catch a GNR train to finish their journey. James Allport arranged a seven-year deal with the GN to run into King's Cross for a guaranteed £20,000 a year (equivalent to £1,960,000 in 2025),. Through services to London were introduced in February 1858. The construction of the Leicester and Hitchin railway cost £1,750,000 (equivalent to £188,020,000 in 2025).

==== St Pancras 1868 ====
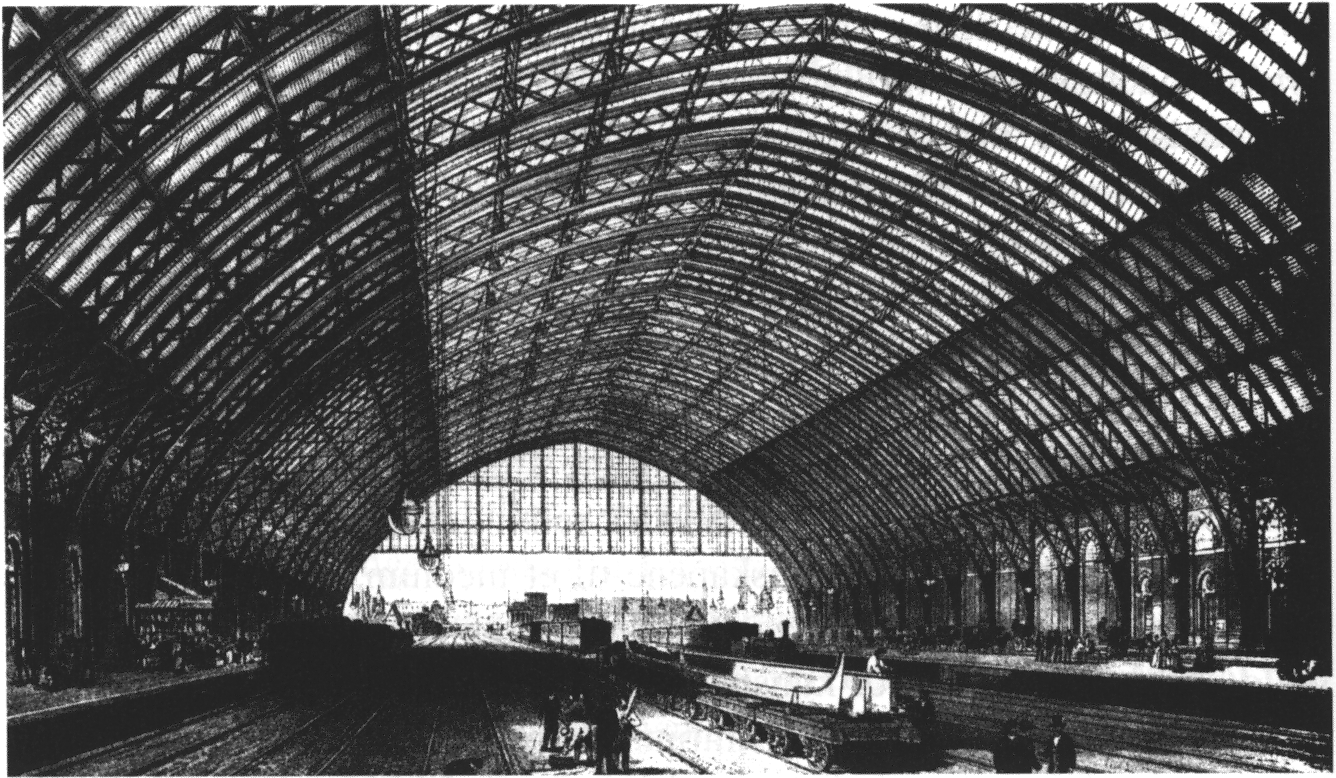
The interior of the Barlow train shed, c. 1870

By 1860 the MR was in a much better position and was able to approach new ventures aggressively. Its carriage of coal and iron – and beer from Burton-on-Trent – had increased by three times and passenger numbers were rising, as they were on the GN. Since GN trains took precedence on its own lines, MR passengers were becoming more and more delayed. Finally in 1862 the decision was taken for the MR to have its own terminus in the capital, as befitted a national railway.

Midland Railway (Extension to London) Act 1863
- Act of Parliament
- Parliament of the United Kingdom
- Long title: An Act for the Construction by the Midland Railway Company of a new Line of Railway between London and Bedford, with Branches therefrom; and for other Purposes.
- Citation: 26 & 27 Vict. c. lxxiv
- Territorial extent: United Kingdom

Dates
- Royal assent: 22 June 1863
- Commencement: 22 June 1863

Status: Amended

Text of statute as originally enacted

On 22 June 1863, the Midland Railway (Extension to London) Act 1863 (26 & 27 Vict. c. lxxiv) was passed: "An Act for the Construction by the Midland Railway Company of a new Line of Railway between London and Bedford, with Branches therefrom; and for other Purposes".

The new line deviated at Bedford, through a gap in the Chiltern Hills at Luton, reaching London by curving around Hampstead Heath to a point between King's Cross and Euston. The line from Bedford to Moorgate opened for passenger services on 13 July 1868 with services into St Pancras station starting on 1 October 1868.

St Pancras station is a strong example of Gothic Revival architecture, in the form of the Midland Grand Hotel by Gilbert Scott, which faces Euston Road, and the wrought-iron train shed designed by William Barlow. Its construction was not simple, since it had to approach through the ancient St Pancras Old Church graveyard. Below was the Fleet Sewer, while a branch from the main line ran underground with a steep gradient beneath the station to join the Metropolitan Railway, which ran parallel to what is now Euston Road.

The construction of the London Extension railway cost £9 million (equivalent to £880 million in 2025).

=== To Manchester ===
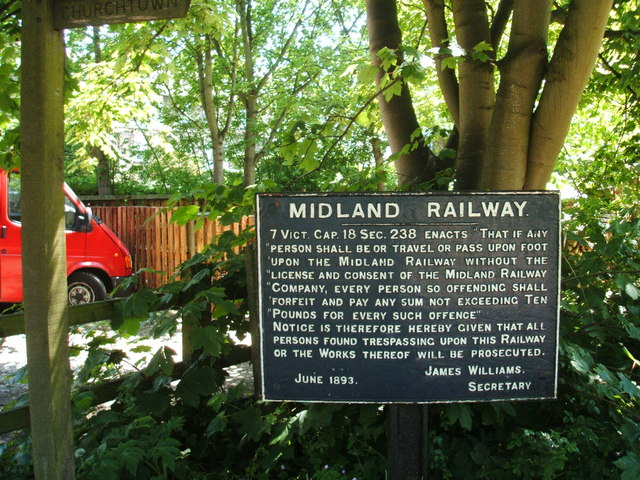
MR sign at Rowsley Station, now on heritage line Peak Rail

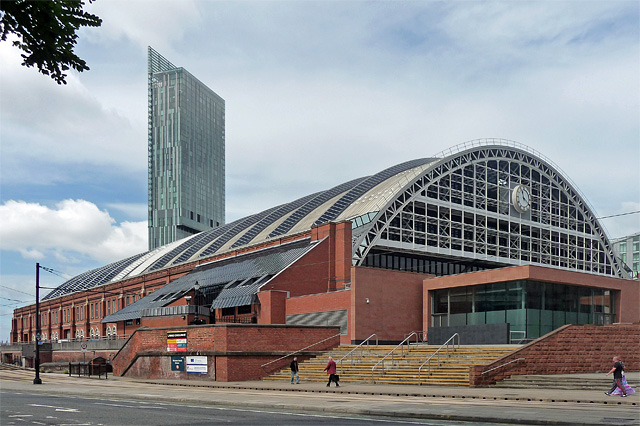
The Grade II* listed Manchester Central train shed, a northern terminus of the Midland Railway.

From the 1820s proposals for lines from London and the East Midlands had been proposed, and they had considered using the Cromford and High Peak Railway to reach Manchester (see Derby station).

Finally the MR joined with the Manchester and Birmingham Railway (M&BR), which was also looking for a route to London from Manchester, in a proposal for a line from Ambergate. The Manchester, Buxton, Matlock and Midlands Junction Railway Act 1846 (9 & 10 Vict. c. cxcii) received royal assent in 1846, in spite of opposition from the Sheffield, Ashton-Under-Lyne and Manchester Railway. It was completed as far as Rowsley a few miles north of Matlock in 1849. However the M&BR had become part of the LNWR in 1846, thus instead of being a partner it had an interest in thwarting the Midland.

In 1863 the MR reached Buxton, just as the LNWR arrived from the other direction by the Stockport, Disley and Whaley Bridge Railway. In 1867 the MR began an alternative line through Wirksworth (now the Ecclesbourne Valley Railway), to avoid the problem of the Ambergate line. The section from Wirksworth to Rowsley, which would have involved some tricky engineering, was not completed because the MR gained control of the original line in 1871, but access to Manchester was still blocked at Buxton. At length an agreement was made with the Manchester, Sheffield and Lincolnshire Railway (MS&LR) to share lines from a branch at Millers Dale and running almost alongside the LNWR, in what became known as the Sheffield and Midland Railway Companies' Committee.

Continuing friction with the LNWR caused the MR to join the MS&LR and the GN in the Cheshire Lines Committee, which also gave scope for wider expansion into Lancashire and Cheshire, and finally a new station at Manchester Central.

In the meantime Sheffield had at last gained a main-line station. Following representations by the council in 1867 the MR promised to build a through line within two years. To the MR's surprise, the Sheffield councillors then backed an improbable speculation called the Sheffield, Chesterfield, Bakewell, Ashbourne, Stafford and Uttoxeter Railway. This was unsurprisingly rejected by Parliament and the Midland built its "New Road" into a station at Pond Street.

Among the last of the major lines built by the MR was a connection between Sheffield and Manchester, by a branch at Dore to Chinley, opened in 1894 through the Totley and Cowburn Tunnels, now the Hope Valley Line.

=== To Scotland ===
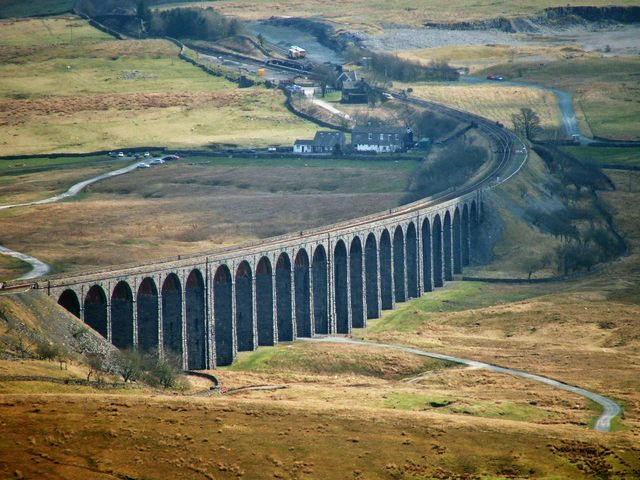
The Ribblehead Viaduct, a recognisable feature of the Settle-Carlisle Railway in April 2006

In the 1870s a dispute with the London and North Western Railway (LNWR) over access rights to the LNWR line to Scotland caused the MR to construct the Settle and Carlisle line, the highest main line in England, to secure access to Scotland.

The dispute with the LNWR was settled before the Settle and Carlisle was built, but Parliament refused to allow the MR to withdraw from the project. The MR was also under pressure from Scottish railway companies, which were eagerly awaiting the Midland traffic reaching Carlisle as it would allow them to challenge the Caledonian Railway's dominance on the West Coast traffic to Glasgow and Edinburgh. The Glasgow and South Western Railway had its own route from Carlisle to Glasgow via Dumfries and Kilmarnock, whilst the North British Railway had built the Waverley Line through the Scottish Borders from Carlisle to Edinburgh. The MR was obliged to go ahead and the Settle to Carlisle opened in 1876.

=== Later history ===
Midland Railway (Additional Powers) Act 1878
- Act of Parliament
- Parliament of the United Kingdom
- Long title: An Act for conferring additional powers on the Midland Railway Company for the construction of railways and other works, the acquisition of lands, and the raising of capital, and for vesting in them the undertaking of the Stonehouse and Nailsworth Railway Company; for conferring powers on the Sheffield and Midland Railway Companies Committee for the acquisition of a private railway and additional lands; and for other purposes.
- Citation: 41 & 42 Vict. c. xcvi

Dates
- Royal assent: 17 June 1878

Text of statute as originally enacted

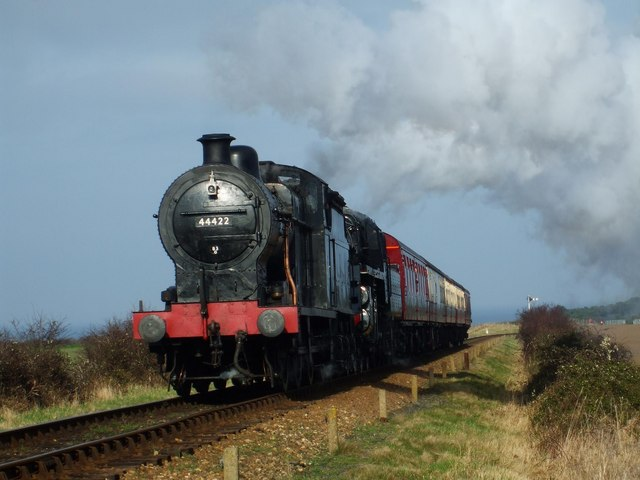
Midland locomotive visiting the North Norfolk Railway, once part of the M&GN, which the Midland part owned

The Nottingham direct line of the Midland Railway opened for goods traffic on 1 December 1879 and for passenger traffic on 1 March 1880.

By the middle of the decade investment had been paid for; passenger travel was increasing, with new comfortable trains; and the mainstay of the line – goods, particularly minerals – was increasing dramatically.

Allport retired in 1880, to be succeeded by John Noble and then by George Turner. By the new century the quantity of goods, particularly coal, was clogging the network. The passenger service was acquiring a reputation for lateness. Lord Farrar reorganised the expresses, but by 1905 the whole system was so overloaded that no one was able to predict when many of the trains would reach their destinations. At this point Sir Guy Granet took over as general manager. He introduced a centralised traffic control system, and the locomotive power classifications that became the model for those used by British Railways.

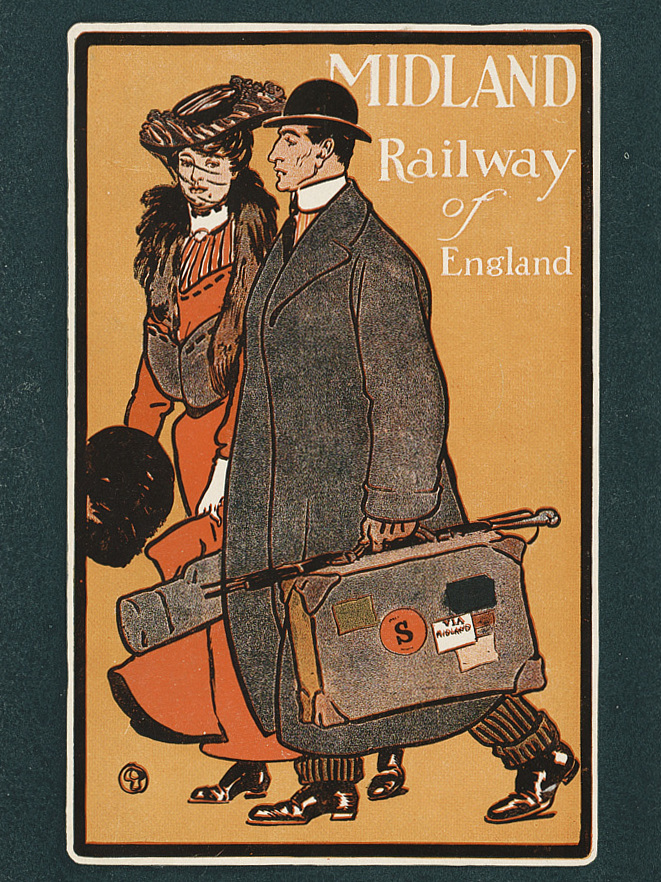
Midland Railway of England poster

The MR acquired other lines, including the Belfast and Northern Counties Railway in 1903 and the London, Tilbury and Southend Railway in 1912. It had running rights on some lines, and it developed lines in partnership with other railways, being involved in more 'Joint' lines than any other. In partnership with the GN it owned the Midland and Great Northern Joint Railway to provide connections from the Midlands to East Anglia, the UK's biggest joint railway. The MR provided motive power for the Somerset & Dorset Joint Railway, and was a one-third partner in the Cheshire Lines Committee.

In 1913, the company achieved a total revenue of £15,129,136 (equivalent to £1.50934×10^{9} in 2025) with working expenses of £9,416,981 (equivalent to £939,470,000 in 2025).

== First World War and the Grouping ==
With the onset of the First World War in 1914, unified Government control of the Midland, and all the main line railways, was imposed through the medium of the Railway Executive Committee. The Midland retained its private sector independence, being given income to match 1913 levels, but was required to undertake huge volumes of military traffic, largely freight, with little opportunity to maintain the network and rolling stock.

At the end of the war, the railways were worn out and it was obvious that resumption of pre-war business was impossible. The Government passed the Railways Act 1921 by which all the main line railways were amalgamated into one or other of four new large concerns, in a process known as the "Grouping". The Midland Railway was a constituent of the new London, Midland and Scottish Railway (LMS) from the beginning of 1923; it was the largest joint stock company in the world.

== Acquisitions ==
- Ashby Canal and Tramway (absorbed 1846)
- Barnoldswick Railway (leased 1871, absorbed 1899)
- Bedford and Northampton Railway (leased 1872, absorbed 1885)
- Northern Counties Committee (in Ireland)
- Birmingham and Gloucester Railway (leased 1845, absorbed 1846)
- Birmingham West Suburban Railway (absorbed 1875)
- Bristol and Gloucester Railway (absorbed 1846)
- Burton and Ashby Light Railway (leased 1906)
- Chesterfield and Brampton Railway (absorbed 1871)
- Cromford Canal (absorbed 1871)
- Dore and Chinley Railway (absorbed 1888)
- Erewash Valley Railway (absorbed 1845)
- Evesham and Redditch Railway (leased 1868, absorbed 1882)
- Hemel Hempsted Railway (leased 1877, absorbed 1886)
- Hereford, Hay and Brecon Railway (leased 1869, absorbed 1886)
- Keighley and Worth Valley Railway (absorbed 1881)
- Kettering, Thrapston and Huntingdon Railway (absorbed 1897)
- Leeds and Bradford Railway (leased 1846, absorbed 1851)
- Leeds and Bradford Extension Railway (absorbed 1851)
- Leicester and Swannington Railway (absorbed 1846)
- London, Tilbury and Southend Railway (purchased 1912, amalgamated 1920)
- Manchester, Buxton, Matlock and Midland Junction Railway (leased 1852, absorbed 1871)
- Manchester South District Railway (absorbed 1877)
- Mansfield and Pinxton Railway (absorbed 1848)
- Midland and South Western Junction Railway (absorbed 1874)
- North Western Railway (also known as the "Little" North Western; leased 1859)
- Oakham Canal (absorbed 1846)
- Redditch Railway (leased 1858, absorbed 1874)
- Sheffield and Rotherham Railway (absorbed 1845)
- Stonehouse and Nailsworth Railway (absorbed 1886)
- Swansea Vale Railway (leased 1874, absorbed 1876)
- Syston and Peterborough Railway (absorbed 1846)
- Tewkesbury and Malvern Railway (absorbed 1876)
- Wolverhampton and Walsall Railway (absorbed 1876)
- Wolverhampton, Walsall and Midland Junction Railway (absorbed 1874)

== Ships ==
The MR operated ships from Heysham to Douglas and Belfast.

== Emblems ==
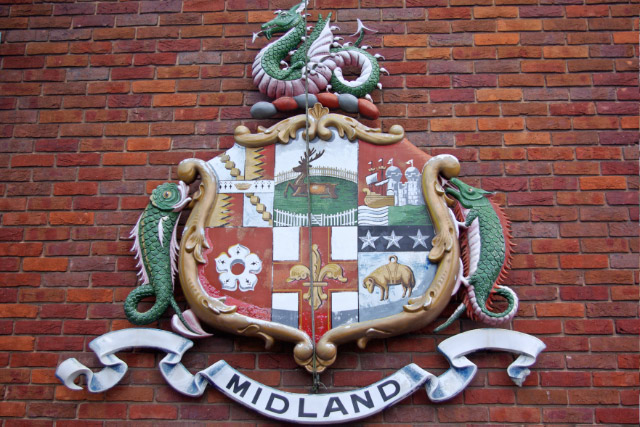
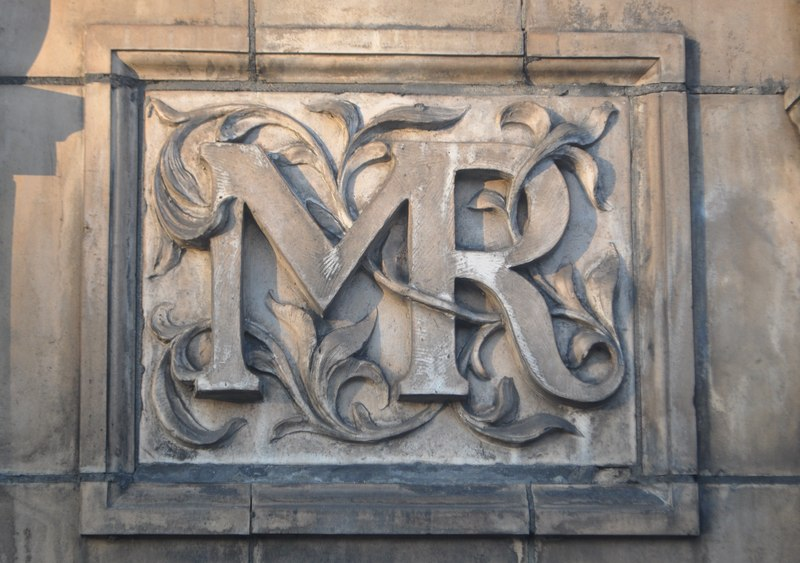
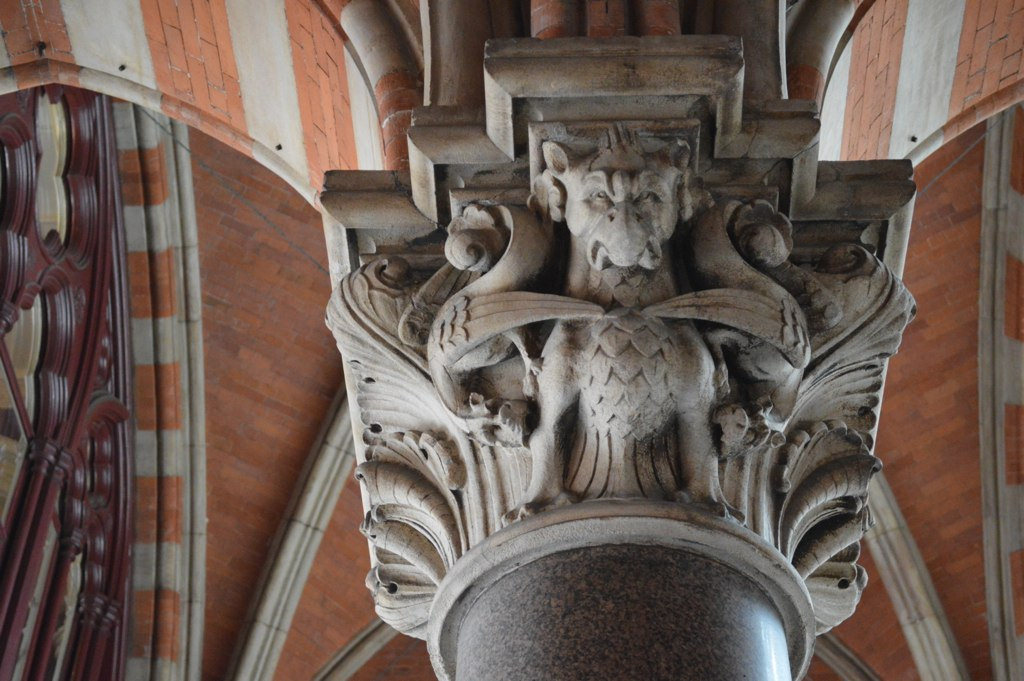
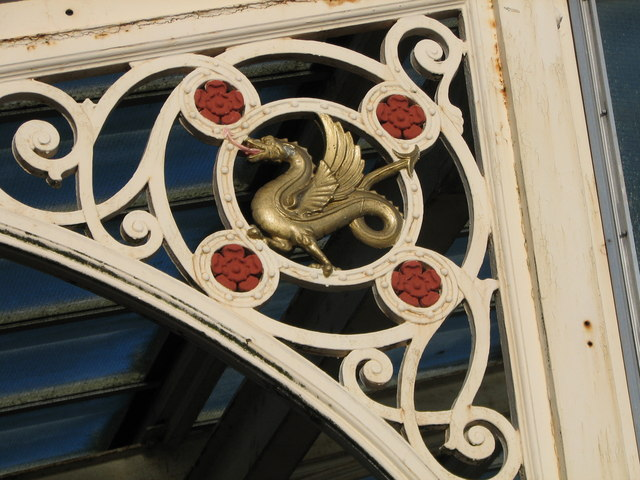
Clockwise from top left: Coat of arms displayed on the outside wall of Derby station; insignia on London Road bridge, Leicester; and wyverns in the wrought iron canopy at Hellifield and in a carved capital at St Pancras

The coat of arms combines the symbols of Birmingham, Derby, Bristol, Leicester, Lincoln and Leeds. The wyvern, a legendary bipedal dragon, was used extensively as an emblem by the Midland, having inherited it from the Leicester and Swannington Railway. The MR, which used a wyvern sans legs (legless) above its crest, asserted that the "wyvern was the standard of the Kingdom of Mercia", and that it was "a quartering in the town arms of Leicester". The symbol appeared on everything from station buildings and bridges down to china, cutlery and chamber pots in its hotels, and was worn as a silver badge by all uniformed employees. However, in 1897 the Railway Magazine noted that there appeared "to be no foundation that the wyvern was associated with the Kingdom of Mercia". It has been associated with Leicester since the time of Thomas, 2nd Earl of Lancaster and Leicester (c. 1278–1322), the most powerful lord in the Midlands, who used it as his personal crest, and was recorded in a heraldic visitation of the town in 1619.

== Accidents and incidents ==
- In June 1850, the boiler of a locomotive exploded at Kegworth railway station, Nottinghamshire.
- In 1850, a train was in a rear-end collision with an excursion train at Woodlesford station, Yorkshire. The cause was a signal not being lit at night.
- In 1853, the boiler of a locomotive exploded whilst it was hauling a freight train near Bristol, Gloucestershire.
- On 9 September 1867, an up cattle train collided with a stationary ballast train in Dove Holes Tunnel. An 11-year-old girl being given an unofficial ride in the ballast train brake-van was killed. The cattle train detached from its two locomotives and ran back down the gradient to New Mills, where it collided with a Manchester-Derby express, which became the second runaway of the incident.
- On 28 August 1875, a passenger train overran signals and was in a rear-end collision with an excursion train at Kildwick, Yorkshire. Seven people were killed and 39 were injured.
- On 11 August 1880, a passenger train was derailed at Wennington, Lancashire. Eight people were killed and 23 were injured.
- On 19 August 1880, a passenger train stops inside Blea Moor Tunnel, Yorkshire due to a faulty brake pipe. An express passenger train overruns signals and is in a rear-end collision at low speed.
- On 27 August 1887, an express passenger train overran signals and collided with a freight train that was being shunted at Wath station, Yorkshire. Twenty-two people were injured.

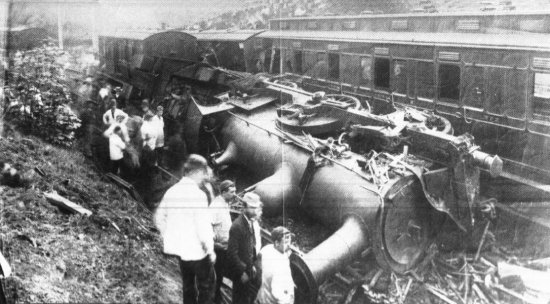
Esholt Junction rail crash

- On 9 June 1892, a passenger train overran signals and was in collision with another at Esholt Junction, Yorkshire. Five people were killed and 30 were injured.
- On 3 December 1892, a freight train crashed at Wymondham Junction., Leicestershire, severely damaging the signal box.

- On 2 September 1898, an express passenger train was derailed at Wellingborough, Northamptonshire by a trolley that had fallen off the platform onto the track. Seven people were killed and 65 were injured.
- On 24 July 1900, a passenger train was derailed at Amberswood, Lancashire. One person was killed.
- On 1 December 1900, a freight train was derailed at Peckwash near Duffield, Derbyshire.
- On 23 December 1904, an express passenger train was derailed at Aylesbury, Buckinghamshire due to excessive speed on a curve. Another express passenger train collided with the wreckage at low speed. Four people were killed.
- On 19 January 1905, an express passenger train overran signals and was in collision with a passenger train at Cudworth, Yorkshire. Seven people were killed.
- In June 1907, a luggage train was derailed by trap points at Silkstream Junction after the driver misread signals.

- On 24 December 1910, an express passenger train was in a rear-end collision with two light engines near Moorcock Tunnel, to the south of Ais Gill Summit, due to errors by the signalman at Hawes Junction and the firemen of the light engines. The train was derailed and caught fire. Twelve people were killed and seventeen were injured.

- On 2 September 1913, a passenger train overran a signal and was in a rear-end collision with another passenger train between Mallerstang and Ais Gill, i.e. to the north of Ais Gill summit. Sixteen people were killed and 38 were injured.

== Notable people ==
Chairmen

- George Hudson 1844 – 1849
- John Ellis 1849 – 1856
- William Evans Hutchinson 1864 – 1870
- William Philip Price 1870 – 1873
- Edward Shipley Ellis 1873 – 1879
- Matthew William Thompson 1880 – 1890
- (George) Ernest Paget 1890 – 1911
- George Murray Smith 1911 – 1919
- Charles Booth 1919 – 1922
- (William) Guy Granet 1922 – 1923

General Managers

- Joseph Sanders 1849 – 1853 (afterwards Secretary)
- James Joseph Allport 1853 – 1857
- W. L. Newcombe 1857 – 1860
- James Joseph Allport 1860 – 1880
- John Noble 1880 – 1892
- George Henry Turner 1892 – 1901
- John Mathieson 1901 – 1905
- (William) Guy Granet 1905 – 1918
- Frank Tatlow 1918 – 1922 (formerly deputy general manager)

Superintendents of the Line

- Edward Moore Needham 1854 – 1890
- William Lowe Mugliston 1890–1902
- Thomas Eaton 1902–1904
- John Elliott 1905– 1910 (formerly station master at Leeds 1877 and station superintendent at St Pancras 1890, and district superintendent for the London division in 1901)

In 1910 the position of Superintendent of the Line was abolished and the responsibilities split between three new roles, a Superintendent of Operation (Mr. A.J. Owen) controlling the movement of all trains and the staff connected with the operation, A Superintendent of Passenger Service (Mr. J. Bagwell) to supervise the arrangement of the services, and a Chief Passenger Agent (Mr. E.R. Ward) controlling fares, rates, advertising canvassing etc.

Locomotive Superintendents and Chief Mechanical Engineers

- Matthew Kirtley 1844 – 1873 (LS)
- Samuel Waite Johnson 1873 – 1904 (LS)
- Richard Deeley 1904 – 1909 (CME)
- Henry Fowler 1909 – 1923 (CME)
- James Anderson 1915 – 1919 (temporary)

Resident Engineers

- William Henry Barlow 1842 – 1857 (afterwards Consulting Engineer)

Chief Architect

- John Holloway Sanders c.1854 – 1884
- Charles Trubshaw 1884 – 1905

Solicitors

- Samuel Carter MP 1835 – 1868

== See also ==
- Midland Railway War Memorial, Derby
- Locomotives of the Midland Railway

== Bibliography ==
- Brodie, Antonia (20 December 2001). Directory of British Architects, 1834–1914. Vol 2. Royal Institute of British Architects. ISBN 9780826455147.
- Dow, George (1973). Railway Heraldry: and other insignia. Newton Abbot: David and Charles. ISBN 9780715358962.
- Truman, P.; Hunt, D. (1989). Midland Railway Portrait. Sheffield: Platform 5. ISBN 0-906579-72-4.
- Williams, Roy (1988). The Midland Railway: A New History. David & Charles. ISBN 0-7153-8750-2.
