= Midland School, North Branch, New Jersey =

Private special education school in North Branch, Somerset County, New Jersey

Midland School
- Official logo as of October 2024

Location
- North Branch, Somerset County, New Jersey; United States; 40°35′47″N 74°42′9″W

Information
- Type: Private school, special education
- Motto: A lifetime of caring—from preschool through adulthood.
- Established: July 11, 1960
- Founder: Dr. Edward G. Scagliotta
- President: Shawn McInerney
- Principal: Jeanette Owens
- Grades: Pre-kindergarten–12
- Gender: Co-ed
- Age range: 3–21
- Enrollment: 92
- Student to teacher ratio: 5.4:1
- Website: www.midlandnj.org

Midland School, or Midland, is a coeducational, nonsectarian, and non-profit special education school located in North Branch (within Branchburg Township), Somerset County, New Jersey. The school provides education from pre-kindergarten to twelfth grade and supports students in their future academic and professional development.

As of the 2021–2022 school year, the school has an enrollment of 92 students (Note: Does not include pre-kindergarten students.) and 16.9 classroom teachers on a full-time equivalent basis, for a student-teacher ratio of 5.4:1.

== History ==
Midland was established on July 11, 1960, by teacher and author Edward G. Scagliotta (June 2, 1927–March 21, 2018) and the parents of the student he was hired to tutor in the late 1950s, David Hardenstine. Hardenstine, then a teenager, was noted to have a "neurological impairment" and suffered from psychomotor seizures, resulting in him being unable to receive a traditional education. There were no public schools on the East Coast that offered services and resources for children and teenagers who required accommodations to help them succeed in their academic careers.

Prior to opening in its present-day location of North Branch, Midland operated out of an abandoned, four-room schoolhouse in Pluckemin, Bedminster Township from 1960 through 1964. At the beginning of the first school year, there were only two part-time students and one full-time student attending Midland. The emergence of a partnership with the Columbia Presbyterian Medical Center led to a rise in the student body, as four more students were admitted into the program through referrals.

The construction of Midland in North Branch began in 1963, following a rise in local interest and support. The project was funded through fundraisers, monetary gifts, and grants. Students were enrolled by September 1964.

== Admissions ==
Admission into Midland requires a referral and the proper documentation, such as the student's current Individualized Education Program (IEP) and recent progress reports from the school they currently attend. It is a three-step process involving application submission, a review from the acting principal, and Child Study Team evaluation. Each step focuses on the student's academic, behavioral, and social needs to determine whether the program would be beneficial to the student.

== Curriculum and structure ==
Midland introduced a pre-kindergarten program in September 2017 that serves students ages three through five. It incorporates an individualized learning method using students' IEPs to assist in early intervention and further development of social, emotional, and cognitive functions. In addition, speech therapy, occupational therapy, and physical therapy are provided as needed. Concurrently, the school established a classroom for students with autism that is structured around aspects of Applied Behavior Analysis therapy, geared towards promoting positive behaviors.

Midland follows a curriculum coordinated with the New Jersey Core Curriculum Content Standards for students in kindergarten through twelfth grade. This curriculum emphasizes personalized learning, considering students’ IEPs and their progress throughout the academic year.

For students ages eighteen through twenty-one, Midland offers the Transition Program, which aims to provide job training for students and encourage independence. Further support in life, social, and community skills is provided on an as-needed basis, depending on a student’s progress.

== Extracurricular activities ==
=== Student council ===
Midland’s student council is composed of chosen student representatives, all of whom are fifteen through twenty-one, from every homeroom in the school. These representatives meet twice a month to plan service projects and events and address any concerns students may have.

=== Intramural sports ===
Sports are offered to students in addition to their adapted physical education period, such as basketball, cheerleading, floor hockey, soccer, softball, and volleyball.

School-wide athletic events are scheduled throughout the school year, such as the Jump-a-Thon, Field Day, and unified games that allow students and teachers to play on the same team.

=== Social and recreational programs ===
Midland currently has six active programs that provide students with ample opportunity to socialize with both their classmates and the faculty. Those programs are chorus, cooking, drama club, rock climbing, dance, and yoga.

== Awards and recognition ==
During the 1989–1990 school year and again during the 1996–1997 school year, Midland was recognized courtesy of the National Blue Ribbon School Award program by the United States Department of Education.
