= North Branch Raritan River =

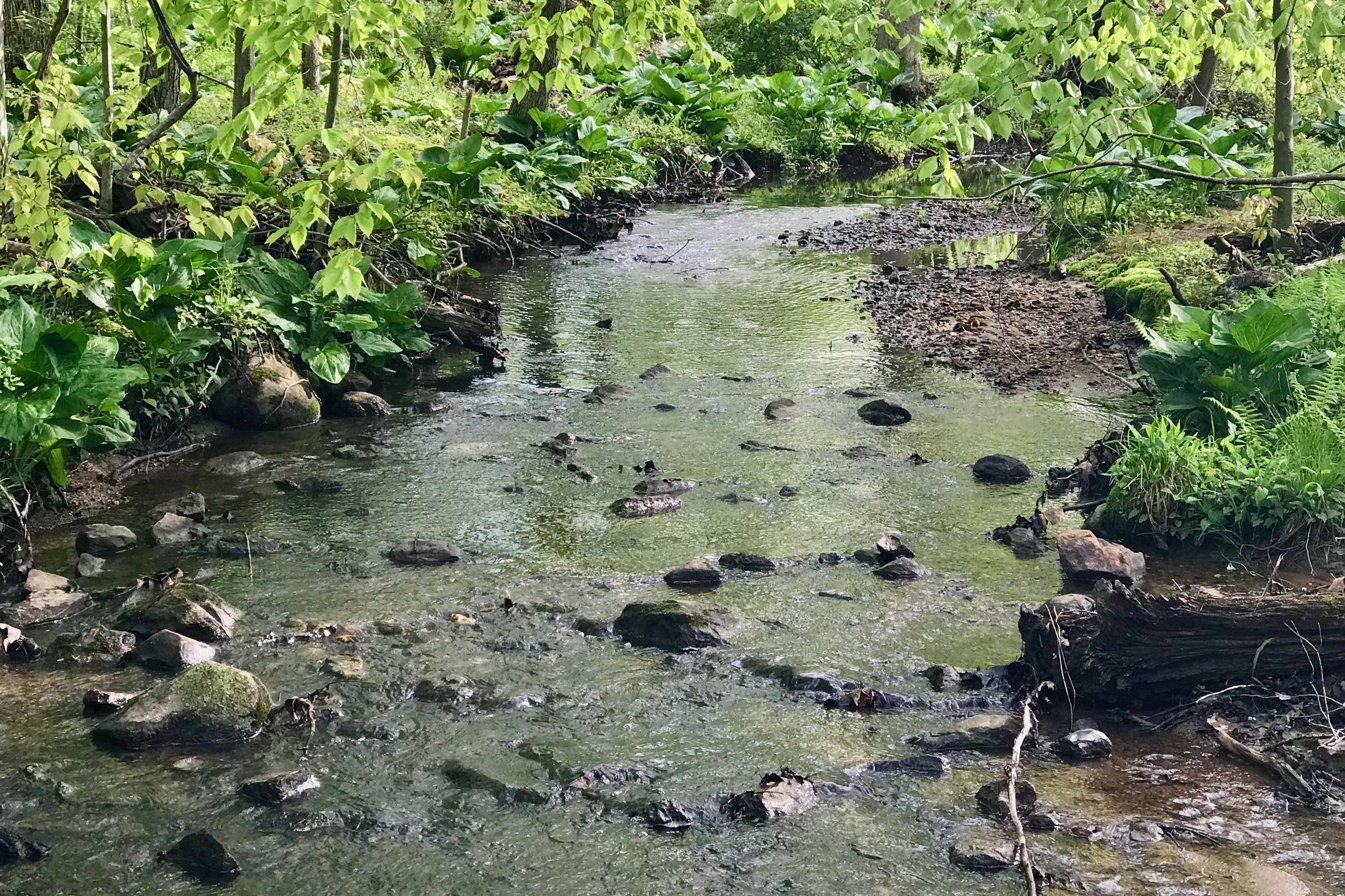
- Near the source in Mendham Borough

Location
- Country: United States
- State: New Jersey
- Region: Morris County; Somerset County

Physical characteristics
- Source: Raritan Pond
  - location: Mendham Borough
  - coordinates: 40°47′16″N 74°35′43″W
- Mouth: Raritan River
  - location: Branchburg
  - coordinates: 40°33′20″N 74°41′15″W

Basin features
- River system: Raritan River

The North Branch Raritan River is a tributary of the Raritan River in central New Jersey, U.S. The North Branch rises in Morris County, in eastern Mendham Borough rising out of Raritan Pond, and flows generally southward into Somerset County, around the southern end of the Watchung Mountains. At its end, it forms the border between Bridgewater and Branchburg Townships, and upon reaching the border of Hillsborough Township, joins the South Branch Raritan River to form the main Raritan River, which generally flows eastward from that point. This area where the branches converge was called "Tucca-Ramma-Hacking" by the Lenape, meaning the flowing together of water. It was called "Two Bridges" by the early European settlers, after a set of bridges built in 1733 that met at a small island (the island has washed away over time) on the North Branch. Today the area is generally referred to as "The Confluence". In the 1970s, the state discussed plans for a Raritan Confluence Reservoir, which have been shelved due to acquisition costs.

Both North and South branches of the Raritan run nearly parallel southwards, east and west of one another, but receive their names from the direction each one flows from at their confluence.

== Gallery ==
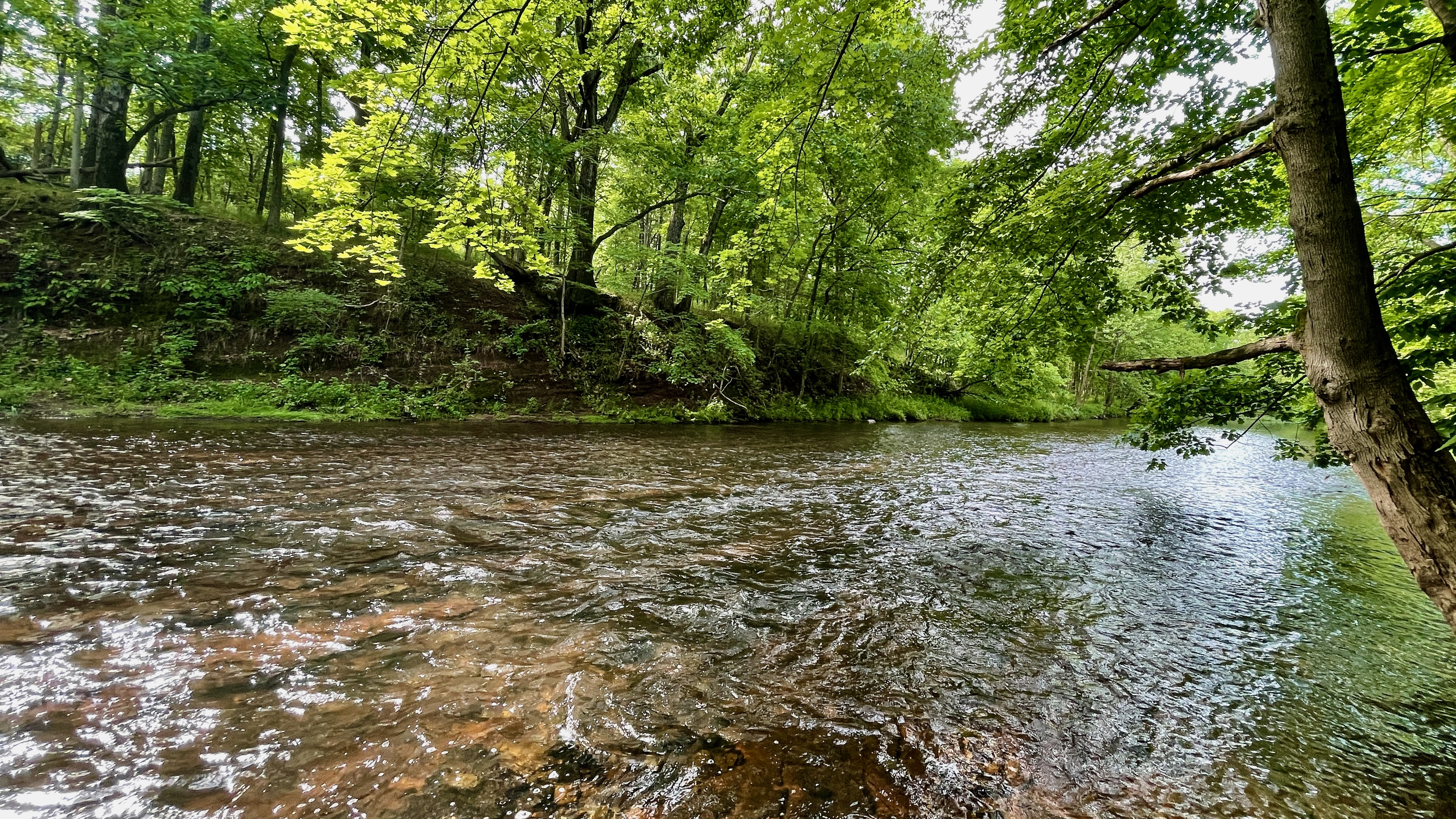
Flowing through Bedminster

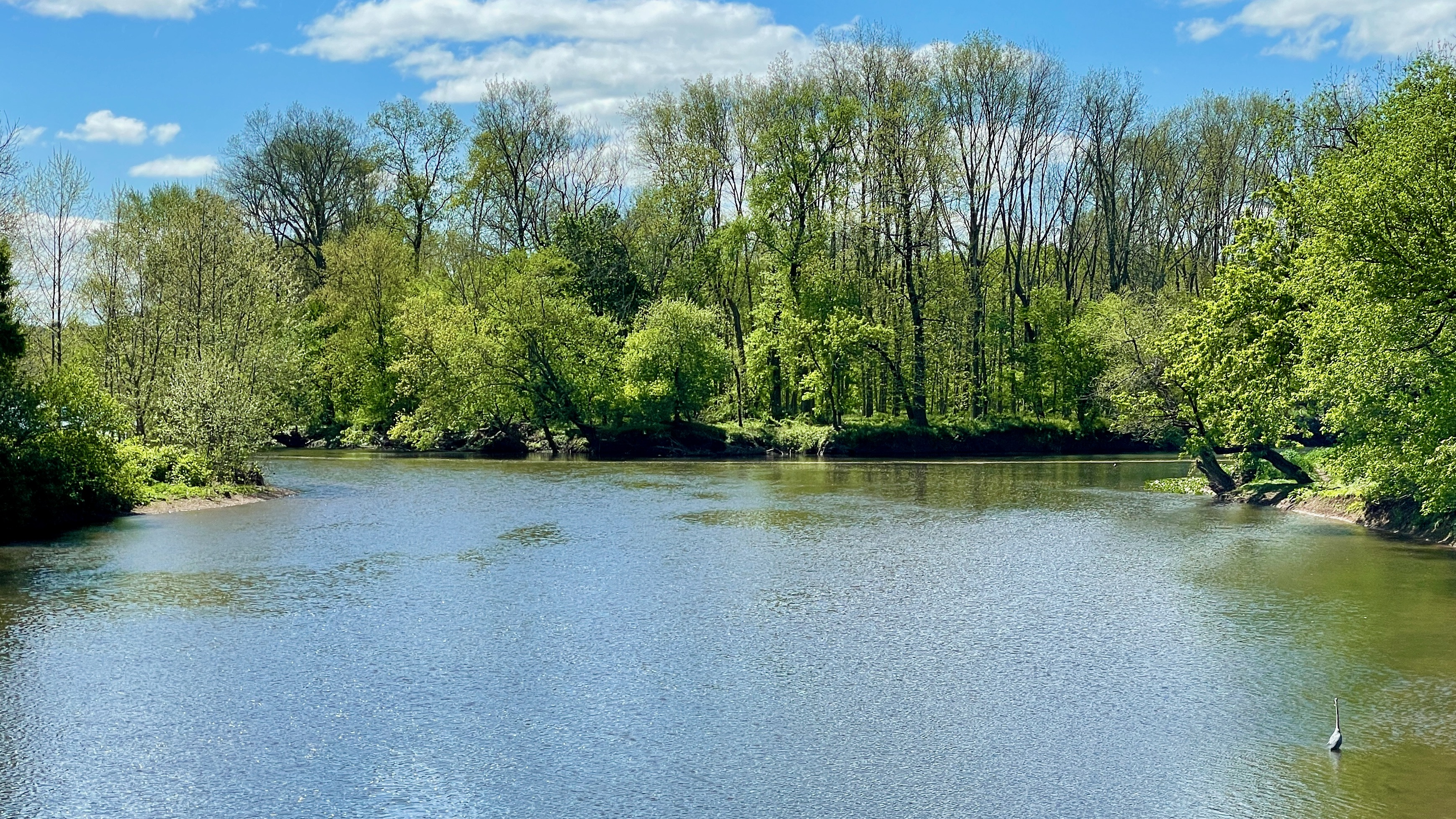
Confluence of the North Branch and the South Branch with the Raritan River

== Tributaries ==
- Black River
- Burnett Brook
- Chambers Brook
- Chamber's Brook
- Clucas Brook
- India Brook
- Larger Brook
- Lamington River
- McVickers Brook
- Middle Brook (Bedminster)
- Mine Brook
- Moggy Brook
- Peapack Brook
- Penns Brook
- Stewart Brook

== See also ==
- List of rivers of New Jersey
- List of crossings of the Raritan River
