= Midland, South Dakota =

- Town
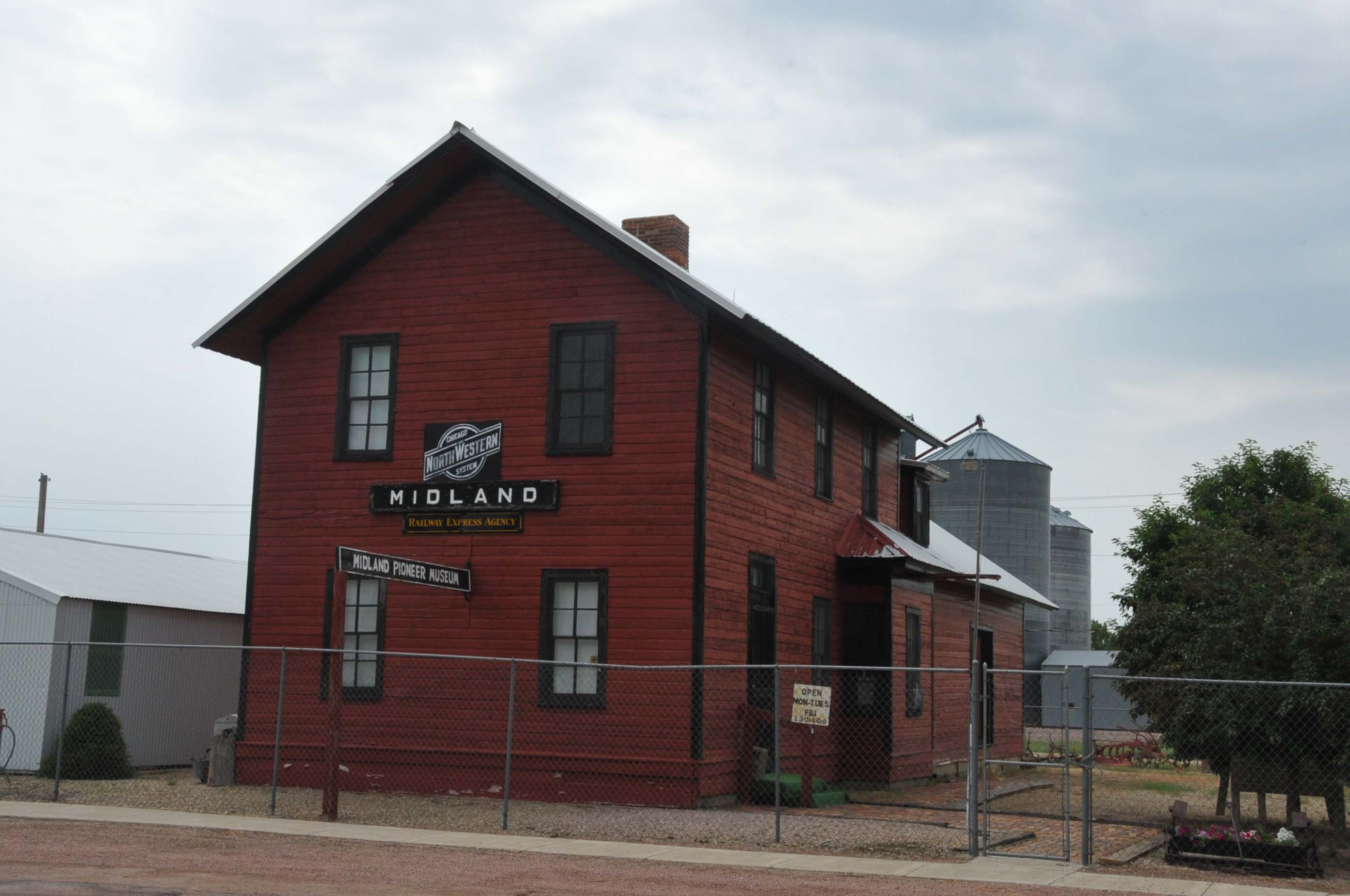
- Midland Museum, July 2013

- Location in Haakon County and the state of South Dakota
- Coordinates: 44°04′16″N 101°09′20″W
- Country: United States
- State: South Dakota
- County: Haakon
- Founded: 1890

Area
  - Total: 0.34 sq mi (0.89 km^{2})
  - Land: 0.34 sq mi (0.89 km^{2})
  - Water: 0 sq mi (0.00 km^{2})
- Elevation: 1,880 ft (570 m)

Population (2020)
  - Total: 112
  - Density: 325.9/sq mi (125.84/km^{2})
- Time zone: UTC-7 (Mountain (MST))
  - Summer (DST): UTC-6 (MDT)
- ZIP code: 57552
- Area code: 605
- FIPS code: 46-42140
- GNIS feature ID: 1267475
- Website: www.midlandsd.com

Midland is a rural small town in the southeastern corner of Haakon County, South Dakota, United States. The population was 112 at the 2020 census.

== History ==
Midland was laid out in 1890. The town was named from its location halfway between the Missouri and Cheyenne rivers. A post office called Midland has been in operation since 1890.

== Geography ==
According to the United States Census Bureau, the town has a total area of 0.34 square miles (0.88 km^{2}), all land.

== Demographics ==
Historical population
Census	Pop.	Note	%±
1910	210		—
1920	309		47.1%
1930	262		−15.2%
1940	282		7.6%
1950	387		37.2%
1960	401		3.6%
1970	270		−32.7%
1980	277		2.6%
1990	233		−15.9%
2000	179		−23.2%
2010	129		−27.9%
2020	112		−13.2%
U.S. Decennial Census

=== 2010 census ===
As of the census of 2010, there were 129 people, 66 households, and 36 families residing in the town. The population density was 379.4 inhabitants per square mile (146.5/km^{2}). There were 92 housing units at an average density of 270.6 per square mile (104.5/km^{2}). The racial makeup of the town was 94.6% White, 4.7% Native American, and 0.8% from two or more races.

There were 66 households, of which 16.7% had children under the age of 18 living with them, 47.0% were married couples living together, 4.5% had a female householder with no husband present, 3.0% had a male householder with no wife present, and 45.5% were non-families. 42.4% of all households were made up of individuals, and 15.2% had someone living alone who was 65 years of age or older. The average household size was 1.95 and the average family size was 2.69.

The median age in the town was 52.3 years. 18.6% of residents were under the age of 18; 3.1% were between the ages of 18 and 24; 15.5% were from 25 to 44; 34.9% were from 45 to 64; and 27.9% were 65 years of age or older. The gender makeup of the town was 53.5% male and 46.5% female.

=== 2000 census ===
As of the census of 2000, there were 179 people, 76 households, and 45 families residing in the town. The population density was 520.9 inhabitants per square mile (201.1/km^{2}). There were 91 housing units at an average density of 264.8 per square mile (102.2/km^{2}). The racial makeup of the town was 99.44% White, and 0.56% from two or more races.

There were 76 households, out of which 38.2% had children under the age of 18 living with them, 48.7% were married couples living together, 9.2% had a female householder with no husband present, and 39.5% were non-families. 38.2% of all households were made up of individuals, and 19.7% had someone living alone who was 65 years of age or older. The average household size was 2.36 and the average family size was 3.22.

In the town, the population was spread out, with 30.7% under the age of 18, 5.6% from 18 to 24, 26.3% from 25 to 44, 20.1% from 45 to 64, and 17.3% who were 65 years of age or older. The median age was 38 years. For every 100 females, there were 92.5 males. For every 100 females age 18 and over, there were 85.1 males.

The median income for a household in the town was $28,214, and the median income for a family was $31,667. Males had a median income of $25,000 versus $18,438 for females. The per capita income for the town was $13,466. About 6.3% of families and 11.4% of the population were below the poverty line, including 8.1% of those under the age of eighteen and 19.4% of those 65 or over.

== See also ==
- List of towns in South Dakota
