= Pleasant Run =

Pleasant Run may refer to the following places in the United States:

- Pleasant Run, Ohio, a census-designated place in Hamilton County
- Pleasant Run Elementary School, a public school in Lancaster, Texas
- Pleasant Run Township, Lawrence County, Indiana
- Pleasant Run Village, a former village in Readington Township, New Jersey
- Pleasant Run (New Jersey), a brook in central New Jersey
- Pleasant Run, West Virginia
- Pleasant Run Greenway, a recreational trail in Indianapolis, Indiana

== Other uses ==
- Pleasant Run (painting), a painting by T. C. Steele
