= Cushetunk =

Cushetunk may refer to:

- Cushetunk, New Jersey
- Cushetunk, New York
- Cushetunk Mountain
