= Readington Township, New Jersey =

Township in Hunterdon County, New Jersey, US

- Township
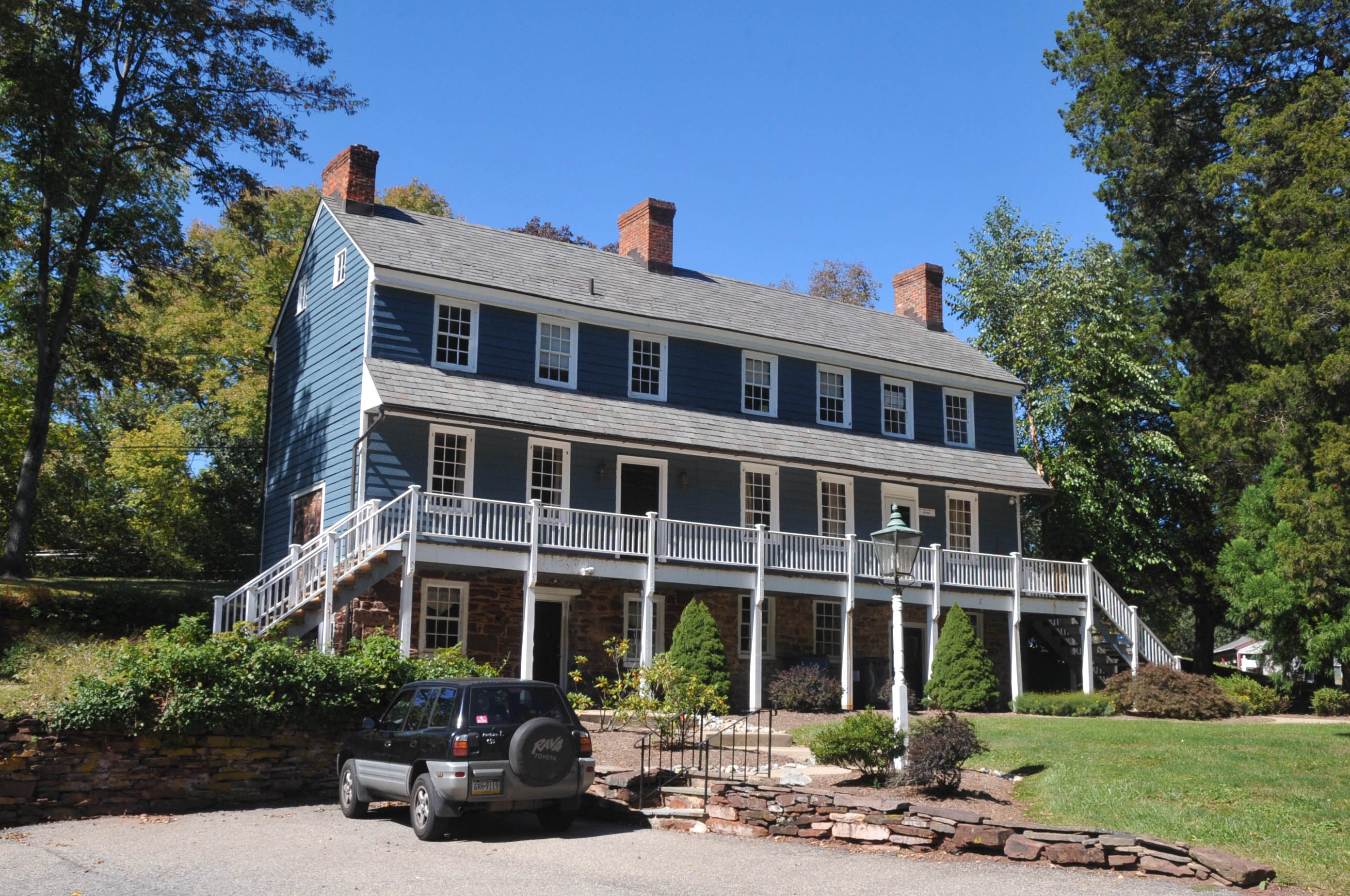
- House in Darts Mills

- Seal

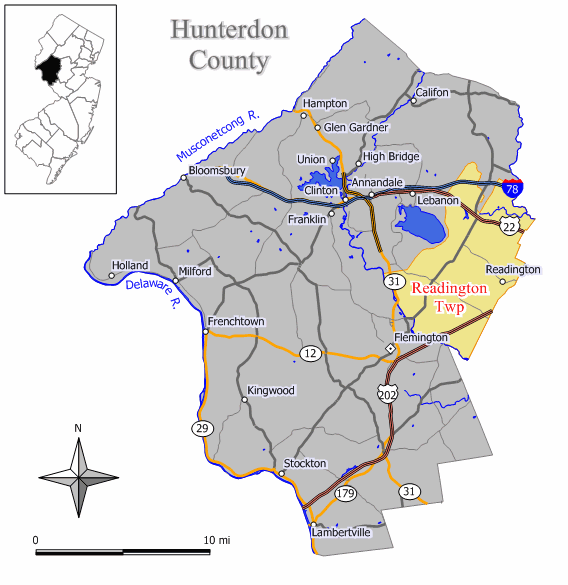
- Location of Readington Township in Hunterdon County highlighted in yellow (right). Inset map: Location of Hunterdon County in New Jersey highlighted in black (left).

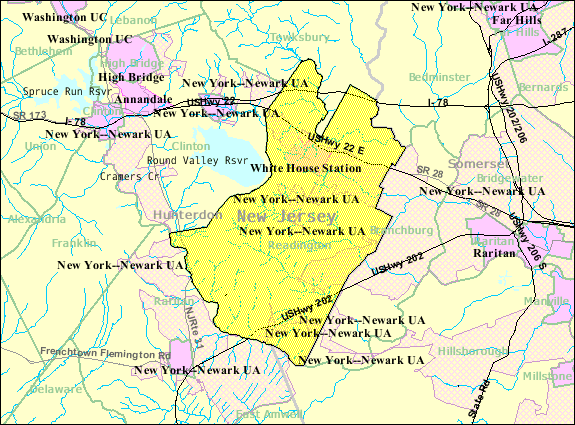
- Census Bureau map of Readington Township, New Jersey

- Location in Hunterdon County Location in New Jersey Location in the United States
- Coordinates: 40.584111°N 74.769986°W
- Country: United States
- State: New Jersey
- County: Hunterdon
- Royal charter: July 15, 1730
- Incorporated: February 21, 1798
- Named for: John Reading

Government
  - Type: Township
  - Body: Township Committee
  - Mayor: Adam Mueller (R, term on committee ends December 31, 2024)
  - Administrator: Richard Sheola
  - Municipal clerk: Karin Parker

Area
  - Total: 47.83 sq mi (123.88 km^{2})
  - Land: 47.56 sq mi (123.17 km^{2})
  - Water: 0.27 sq mi (0.70 km^{2}) 0.57%
  - Rank: 34th of 565 in state 1st of 26 in county
- Elevation: 213 ft (65 m)

Population (2020)
  - Total: 16,128
  - Estimate (2023): 16,257
  - Rank: 163rd of 565 in state 2nd of 26 in county
  - Density: 339.1/sq mi (130.9/km^{2})
  - Rank: 467th of 565 in state 16th of 26 in county
- Time zone: UTC−05:00 (Eastern (EST))
  - Summer (DST): UTC−04:00 (Eastern (EDT))
- ZIP Code: 08870 – Readington; 08888 – Whitehouse; 08889 – Whitehouse Station
- Area code: 908
- FIPS code: 3401962250
- GNIS feature ID: 0882178
- Website: www.readington.gov

Readington Township is a township located in the easternmost portion of Hunterdon County, in the U.S. state of New Jersey. As of the 2020 United States census, the township's population was 16,128, an increase of two people (+0.0%) from the 2010 census count of 16,126, which in turn reflected an increase of 323 (+2.0%) from the 15,803 counted in the 2000 census.

Created by Royal charter of King George II, "Reading" Township was formed on July 15, 1730, from portions of Amwell Township. It was the first new township created after Hunterdon was established as an independent county. The township was incorporated as Readingtown Township, one of New Jersey's initial group of 104 townships, on February 21, 1798. Portions of the township were annexed by Tewksbury Township in 1832 and 1861. The township was named for John Reading, the first native-born governor of the British Province of New Jersey.

Covering more than 48 square miles (120 km^{2}), it is the largest township in the county, covering almost 11% of the county's area. More than 8,000 acres (32 km^{2}) of land have been preserved from development. Readington Township is bounded on the north by the Lamington River and Rockaway Creek; to the east by Somerset County, which existed as the boundary between East and West Jersey from 1688 to 1695; to the south, the South Branch of the Raritan River; and to the west by the old West Jersey Society's line which crosses the Cushetunk Mountains.

== Geography ==
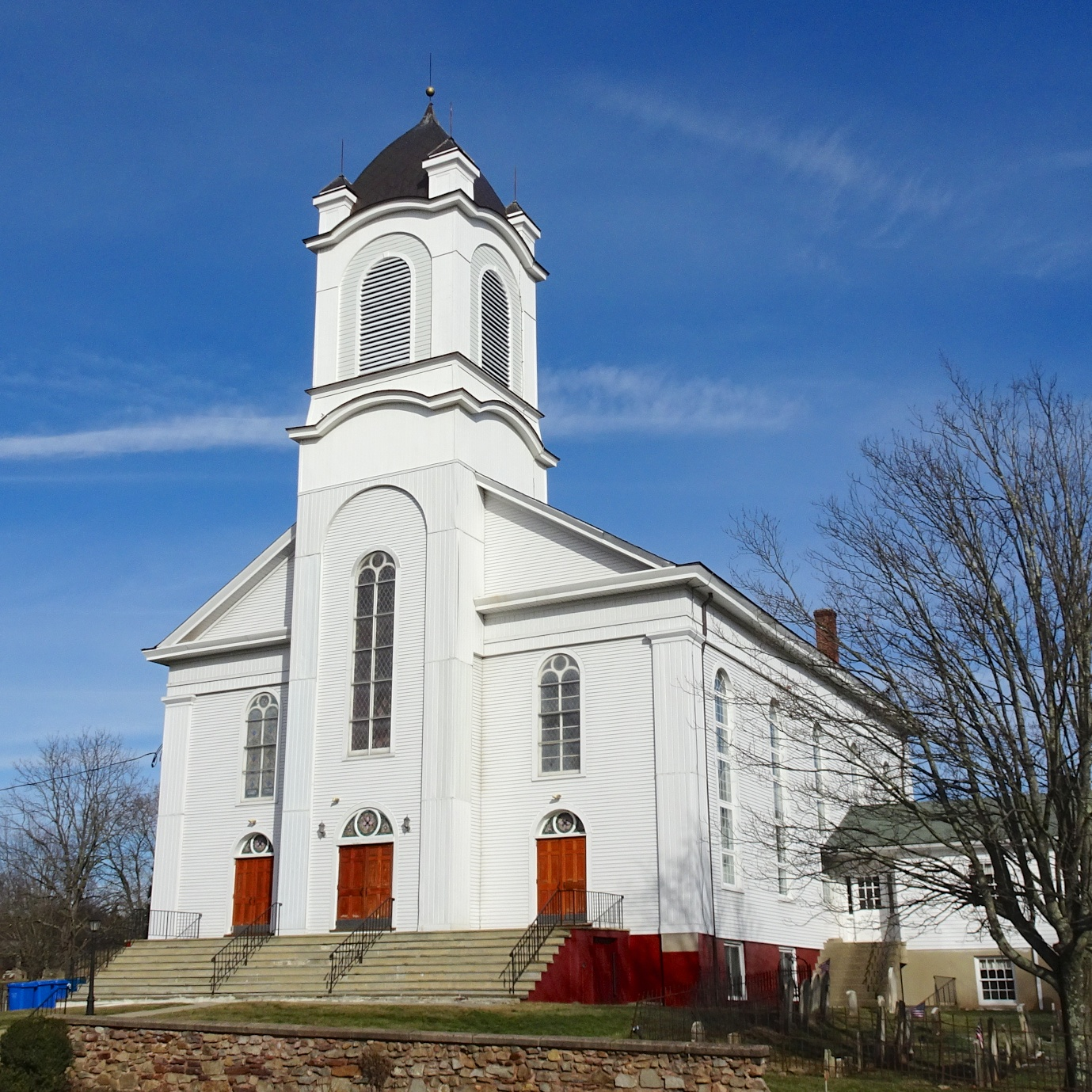
Readington Reformed Church in Readington Village

According to the United States Census Bureau, the township had a total area of 47.83 square miles (123.88 km^{2}), including 47.56 square miles (123.17 km^{2}) of land and 0.27 square miles (0.70 km^{2}) of water (0.57%).

Cushetunk Mountain is a ring-shaped mountain located in Clinton Township. The diabase mountain was formed 160 million years ago. The Lenape called the mountain "Cushetunk" meaning "place of hogs". In the 1960s, the valley was filled with water to create Round Valley Reservoir, at 180 feet (55 m) in depth the second-deepest in the state.

Whitehouse Station (2010 Census population of 2,089) is an unincorporated community and census-designated place (CDP) located within Readington Township.

The township borders the municipalities of Clinton Township, Raritan Township and Tewksbury Township in Hunterdon County; and Branchburg and Hillsborough Township in Somerset County.

=== Communities ===
Unincorporated communities, localities and place names located partially or completely within the township include Backers Island, Higginsville, McCrea Mills, Riverside, Rockfellows Mills, Round Mountain, Stovers Mills and Wood Church, as well as the following:

- Barley Sheaf, a former hamlet within Readington Township, also known as Campbellsville and Farmersville
- Centerville, a hamlet that was located on the halfway point on the Swift Sure Stage route between New York City and Philadelphia
- Cushetunk was a settlement near Cushetunk Mountain and the railroad line
- Darts Mills, a hamlet centered around a former mill complex on the South Branch Raritan River
- Dreahook, a former community near Readington Road and Main Street that was taken from the Dutch word for triangle because of the configuration of the roads at the time
- Holcomb Mills was a community along the South Branch Raritan River
- Mechanicsville, the eastern section of Whitehouse Village on the Jersey Turnpike
- Neshanic Station, a village made up primarily of the Neshanic Station Historic District that is primarily located in Branchburg
- New Bromley, was a small community on the Rockaway Creek that was once home to William Paterson
- Pleasant Run, a small community along Pleasant Run (formerly Campbell's Brook)
- Potterstown, a small community at the western edge of the township
- Readington Village, the oldest settled community in the township, along Holland Brook
- Rowland's Mills, a deserted community on the South Branch Raritan River
- Stanton, a small community near Round Mountain that has carried the names of Mount Pleasant, Housel's Hill, Waggoner's Hill and Stanton
- Stilwells, a hamlet located 1.5 miles (2.4 km) south of Whitehouse Station named after the Stilwell family
- Three Bridges, small community that once had a passenger rail station
- Whitehouse, a community on the old Jersey Turnpike, north of Whitehouse Station
- Whitehouse Station, a community in the western section of Readington near Cushetunk Mountain and the location of the township's railroad station

== Demographics ==
Historical population
Census	Pop.	Note	%±
1810	1,717		—
1820	1,964		14.4%
1830	2,102		7.0%
1840	2,373		12.9%
1850	2,836		19.5%
1860	3,076		8.5%
1870	3,070		−0.2%
1880	3,103		1.1%
1890	2,813		−9.3%
1900	2,670		−5.1%
1910	2,569		−3.8%
1920	2,525		−1.7%
1930	2,811		11.3%
1940	2,905		3.3%
1950	4,080		40.4%
1960	6,147		50.7%
1970	7,688		25.1%
1980	10,855		41.2%
1990	13,400		23.4%
2000	15,803		17.9%
2010	16,126		2.0%
2020	16,128		0.0%
2023 (est.)	16,257		0.8%
Population sources: 1810–1920 1840 1850–1870; 1850 1870 1880–1890; 1890–1910 1910–1930; 1940–2000 2000; 2010 2020

=== 2010 census ===
The 2010 United States census counted 16,126 people, 5,971 households, and 4,496 families in the township. The population density was 337.8 per square mile (130.4/km^{2}). There were 6,191 housing units at an average density of 129.7 per square mile (50.1/km^{2}). The racial makeup was 93.09% (15,011) White, 1.33% (214) Black or African American, 0.11% (18) Native American, 3.60% (581) Asian, 0.01% (1) Pacific Islander, 0.77% (124) from other races, and 1.10% (177) from two or more races. Hispanic or Latino of any race were 3.93% (633) of the population.

Of the 5,971 households, 35.1% had children under the age of 18; 66.0% were married couples living together; 6.6% had a female householder with no husband present and 24.7% were non-families. Of all households, 20.7% were made up of individuals and 8.0% had someone living alone who was 65 years of age or older. The average household size was 2.70 and the average family size was 3.15.

25.1% of the population were under the age of 18, 5.6% from 18 to 24, 20.4% from 25 to 44, 35.3% from 45 to 64, and 13.5% who were 65 years of age or older. The median age was 44.4 years. For every 100 females, the population had 96.2 males. For every 100 females ages 18 and older there were 94.1 males.

The Census Bureau's 2006–2010 American Community Survey showed that (in 2010 inflation-adjusted dollars) median household income was $120,821 (with a margin of error of +/− $9,180) and the median family income was $138,171 (+/− $10,232). Males had a median income of $100,647 (+/− $11,576) versus $61,372 (+/− $6,196) for females. The per capita income for the borough was $55,493 (+/− $4,019). About 1.3% of families and 1.9% of the population were below the poverty line, including 2.7% of those under age 18 and 1.7% of those age 65 or over.

=== 2000 census ===
As of the 2000 United States census there were 15,803 people, 5,676 households, and 4,410 families residing in the township. The population density was 331.4 inhabitants per square mile (128.0/km^{2}). There were 5,794 housing units at an average density of 121.5 per square mile (46.9/km^{2}). The racial makeup of the township was 95.14% White, 0.76% African American, 0.06% Native American, 2.56% Asian, 0.53% from other races, and 0.94% from two or more races. Hispanic or Latino of any race were 2.05% of the population.

There were 5,676 households, out of which 37.9% had children under the age of 18 living with them, 69.3% were married couples living together, 6.1% had a female householder with no husband present, and 22.3% were non-families. 18.2% of all households were made up of individuals, and 5.8% had someone living alone who was 65 years of age or older. The average household size was 2.77 and the average family size was 3.18.

In the township the population was spread out, with 26.5% under the age of 18, 4.9% from 18 to 24, 30.6% from 25 to 44, 28.3% from 45 to 64, and 9.8% who were 65 years of age or older. The median age was 39 years. For every 100 females, there were 97.0 males. For every 100 females age 18 and over, there were 93.7 males.

The median income for a household in the township was $95,356, and the median income for a family was $106,343. Males had a median income of $66,778 versus $48,385 for females. The per capita income for the township was $41,000. About 0.7% of families and 1.6% of the population were below the poverty line, including 1.4% of those under age 18 and 1.8% of those age 65 or over.

== Economy ==
Readington Township is home to the personal and commercial lines of insurance of Chubb, and the QuickChek Corporation, which operates over 100 convenience stores throughout New Jersey and New York.

Readington was once also home to the global headquarters of Merck & Co., one of the largest pharmaceutical companies in the country, but the company has since relocated to nearby Kenilworth, New Jersey.

Readington's business climate benefits from its proximity to major highways, Princeton, Bridgewater Township and other centers of business in central New Jersey.

== Arts and culture ==
Readington is home to several museums and offers many programs for adults and children. The Bouman-Stickney Homestead is located off of Dreahook Road in the hamlet of Stanton. Coldbrook School, the site of living history programs for the township's elementary school children, is in the northern section of town, and the Eversole-Hall House is located on Route 523, next to the Municipal building. Taylor's Mill, listed on the National Register of Historic Places, was built around 1760 by John Taylor. It is the only remaining pre-revolutionary mill in the township and was used to provide troops with food during the Revolutionary War. The township plans to make Taylor's Mill a fourth township museum.

== Government ==
=== Local government ===
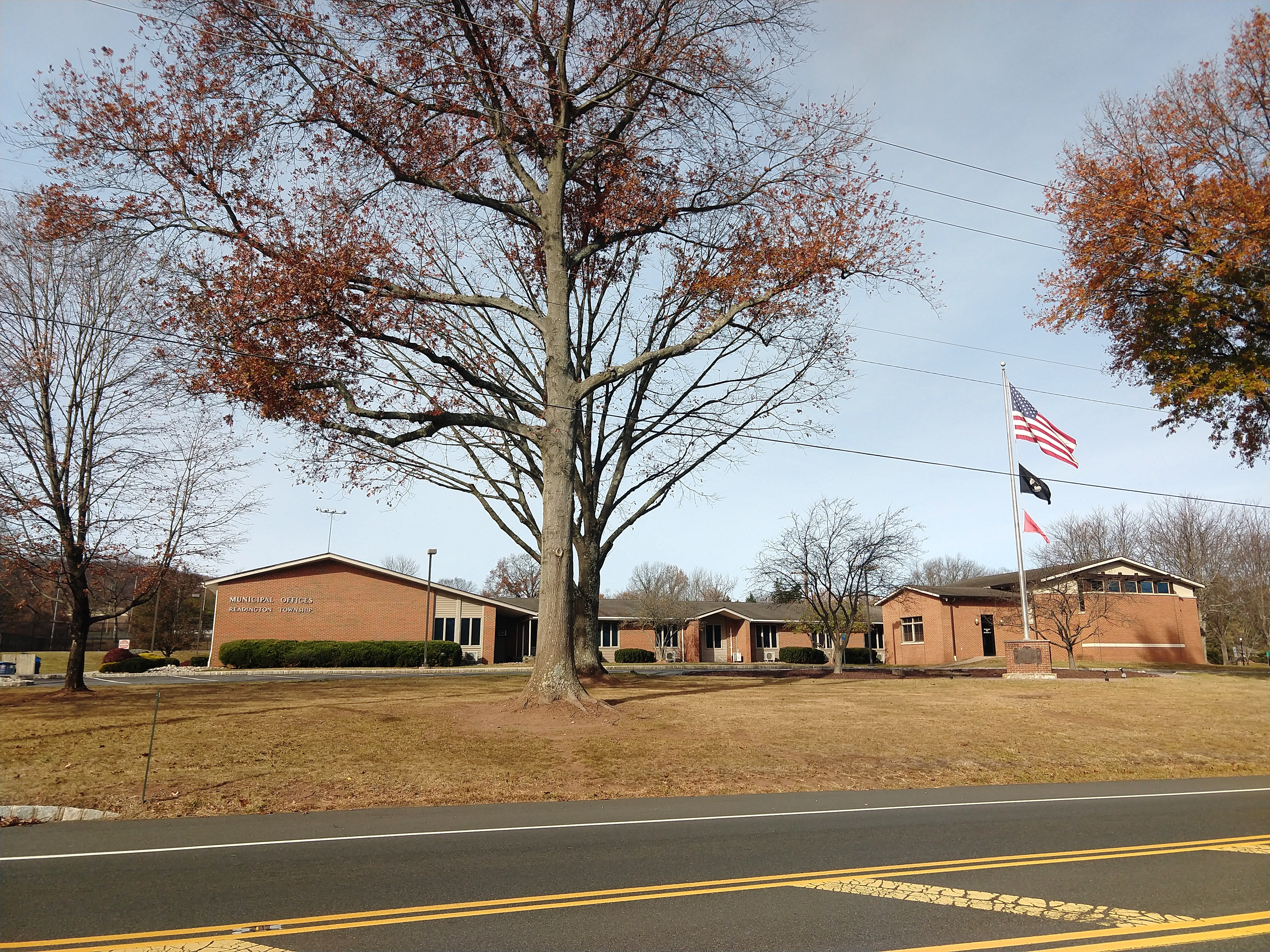
Readington Township Municipal Building

Readington Township is governed under the Township form of New Jersey municipal government, one of 141 municipalities (of the 564) statewide that use this form, the second-most commonly used form of government in the state. The Township Committee is composed of five members, who are elected directly by the voters at-large in partisan elections to serve three-year terms of office on a staggered basis, with either one or two seats coming up for election each year as part of the November general election in a three-year cycle. At an annual reorganization meeting, the Township Committee selects one of its members to serve as Mayor. The Mayor serves as chair of the Township Committee and has the powers vested in the mayor's office by general law.

As of 2023, members of the Readington Township Committee are Mayor Adam Mueller (R, term on committee and as mayor ends December 31, 2024), Deputy Mayor Vincent Panico (R, term on committee ends 2025; term as deputy member ends 2024), John Albanese (R, 2026), Jonathan Heller (R, 2026) and R. Juergen Huelsebusch (R, 2024).

In the 2017 general election, Republicans John Albanese (3887 votes) and Jonathan Heller (3738 votes) prevailed against Democratic challenger Alan Harwick (2027 votes) The all-Republican Committee was unanimous on the leadership roles at the 2018 reorganization meeting, choosing Benjamin Smith as mayor and Betty Ann Fort as deputy mayor.

In December 2014, the Township Council selected M. Elizabeth Duffy from a list of three candidates nominated by the Republican municipal committee to fill the vacant seat of Beatrice Muir, who had resigned the previous month from a term of office ending in December 2015.

=== Federal, state and county representation ===
Readington Township is located in the 7th Congressional District and is part of New Jersey's 16th state legislative district.

For the 119th United States Congress, New Jersey's 7th congressional district is represented by Thomas Kean Jr. (R, Westfield). New Jersey is represented in the United States Senate by Democrats Cory Booker (Newark, term ends 2027) and Andy Kim (Moorestown, term ends 2031).

For the 2026–2027 session, the 16th legislative district of the New Jersey Legislature is represented in the New Jersey Senate by Andrew Zwicker (D, South Brunswick) and in the General Assembly by Mitchelle Drulis (D, East Amwell Township) and Roy Freiman (D, Hillsborough Township).

Hunterdon County is governed by a Board of County Commissioners comprised of five members who are elected at-large on a partisan basis to serve three-year terms of office on a staggered basis, with either one or two seats up for election each year as part of the November general election. At an annual reorganization meeting held each January, the commissioners select one member to serve as the board's Director and another to serve as Deputy Director, each for a one-year term. As of 2025, Hunterdon County's Commissioners are Director John E. Lanza (R; Raritan Township, 2025), Deputy Director Shaun C. Van Doren (R; Tewksbury Township, 2026), Jeff Kuhl (R; Raritan Township, 2027), Zachary T. Rich (R; West Amwell Township, 2025) and Susan Soloway (R; Franklin Township, 2027).

Constitutional officers elected on a countywide basis are Clerk Mary H. Melfi (R; Flemington, 2026), Sheriff Fredrick W. Brown (R; Alexandria Township, 2025) and Surrogate Heidi Rohrbach (R; Lebanon Township, 2028).

=== Politics ===
As of March 2011, there were a total of 11,223 registered voters in Readington Township, of which 1,745 (15.5%) were registered as Democrats, 5,118 (45.6%) were registered as Republicans and 4,354 (38.8%) were registered as Unaffiliated. There were 6 voters registered as Libertarians or Greens.

Gubernatorial election results for Readington Township
Year	Republican		Democratic		Third party(ies)	
Year	No.	%	No.	%	No.	%
2025	5,136	56.81%	3,858	42.67%	47	0.52%
2021	4,877	64.23%	2,663	35.07%	53	0.70%
2017	3,819	64.47%	1,990	33.59%	115	1.94%
2013	4,524	79.08%	1,114	19.47%	83	1.45%
2009	4,771	71.13%	1,395	20.80%	541	8.07%
2005	4,163	66.95%	1,808	29.08%	247	3.97%

In the 2012 presidential election, Republican Mitt Romney received 63.8% of the vote (5,537 cast), ahead of Democrat Barack Obama with 35.0% (3,039 votes), and other candidates with 1.2% (103 votes), among the 8,730 ballots cast by the township's 11,700 registered voters (51 ballots were spoiled), for a turnout of 74.6%. In the 2008 presidential election, Republican John McCain received 61.1% of the vote (5,646 cast), ahead of Democrat Barack Obama with 37.0% (3,425 votes) and other candidates with 1.1% (100 votes), among the 9,245 ballots cast by the township's 11,302 registered voters, for a turnout of 81.8%. In the 2004 presidential election, Republican George W. Bush received 63.5% of the vote (5,566 ballots cast), outperforming Democrat John Kerry with 35.7% (3,127 votes) and other candidates with 0.9% (91 votes), among the 8,767 ballots cast by the township's 10,679 registered voters, for a turnout percentage of 82.1.

United States presidential election results for Readington Township
Year	Republican		Democratic		Third party(ies)	
Year	No.	%	No.	%	No.	%
2024	6,216	57.04%	4,503	41.32%	179	1.64%
2020	6,228	55.13%	4,858	43.00%	211	1.87%
2016	5,565	58.21%	3,590	37.55%	405	4.24%
2012	5,537	63.80%	3,039	35.02%	103	1.19%
2008	5,646	61.56%	3,425	37.35%	100	1.09%
2004	5,566	63.37%	3,127	35.60%	91	1.04%

In the 2013 gubernatorial election, Republican Chris Christie received 79.1% of the vote (4,524 cast), ahead of Democrat Barbara Buono with 19.5% (1,114 votes), and other candidates with 1.5% (83 votes), among the 5,812 ballots cast by the township's 11,669 registered voters (91 ballots were spoiled), for a turnout of 49.8%. In the 2009 gubernatorial election, Republican Chris Christie received 70.4% of the vote (4,771 ballots cast), ahead of Democrat Jon Corzine with 20.6% (1,395 votes), Independent Chris Daggett with 7.3% (495 votes) and other candidates with 0.7% (46 votes), among the 6,777 ballots cast by the township's 11,169 registered voters, yielding a 60.7% turnout.

United States Senate election results for Readington Township1
Year	Republican		Democratic		Third party(ies)	
Year	No.	%	No.	%	No.	%
2024	5,851	56.60%	4,227	40.89%	260	2.51%
2018	5,196	62.15%	2,890	34.57%	275	3.29%
2012	5,119	62.38%	2,831	34.50%	256	3.12%
2006	3,644	62.41%	1,986	34.01%	209	3.58%

United States Senate election results for Readington Township2
Year	Republican		Democratic		Third party(ies)	
Year	No.	%	No.	%	No.	%
2020	6,375	57.54%	4,466	40.31%	238	2.15%
2014	3,500	62.81%	1,952	35.03%	120	2.15%
2013	2,459	67.30%	1,172	32.07%	23	0.63%
2008	5,614	65.78%	2,642	30.96%	278	3.26%

== Education ==
The Readington Township Public Schools serve students in pre-kindergarten through eighth grade. As of the 2023–24 school year, the district, comprised of four schools, had an enrollment of 1,404 students and 167.2 classroom teachers (on an FTE basis), for a student–teacher ratio of 8.4:1. Schools in the district (with 2023–24 enrollment data from the National Center for Education Statistics) are Three Bridges School with 294 students in grades PreK–3, Whitehouse School with 312 students in grades K–3, Holland Brook School with 302 students in grades 4–5 and Readington Middle School with 486 students in grades 6–8.

Students in public school for ninth through twelfth grades attend the Hunterdon Central Regional High School, part of the Hunterdon Central Regional High School District, which also serves students in central Hunterdon County from Delaware Township, East Amwell Township, Flemington Borough and Raritan Township. As of the 2023–24 school year, the high school had an enrollment of 2,408 students and 226.7 classroom teachers (on an FTE basis), for a student–teacher ratio of 10.6:1. Seats on the high school district's nine-member board of education are allocated based on the population of the five constituent municipalities who participate in the school district, with two seats allocated to Readington Township, a decrease of one seat based on the results of the 2020 Census.

Eighth grade students from all of Hunterdon County are eligible to apply to attend the high school programs offered by the Hunterdon County Vocational School District, a county-wide vocational school district that offers career and technical education at its campuses in Raritan Township and at programs sited at local high schools, with no tuition charged to students for attendance.

== Emergency services ==
Readington Township is served by a full-time Police Department, two ambulances staffed by the Whitehouse Rescue Squad, and four volunteer Fire Companies.

=== EMS and rescue services ===
- The Whitehouse First Aid & Rescue Squad Station 22 Rescue was formed in 1950 and provides the lead EMS & Rescue coordination for the Township under the leadership of Chief Jeff Herzog. They are a blended department with career and volunteer members, and a roster of over 50 EMTs. The squad responds to over 2200 calls per year in Readington and Tewksbury Townships. The squad has a rescue services division led by volunteers for rescue operations such as automobile extrication, confined space and water rescue. 22 Rescue is located on Main Street in Whitehouse Station.

=== Fire departments ===
The following volunteer fire departments serve the Township:

- Whitehouse Fire Company #1 (Station 22 Fire)
- Readington Volunteer Fire Co., established in 1958 (Station 32 Fire)
- Three Bridges Volunteer Fire Co., established in 1927 (Station 33 Fire)
- East Whitehouse Volunteer Fire Co., organized in December 1923, Retired in 2022 (Station 31 Fire)

== Transportation ==
=== Roads and highways ===
As of May 2010, the township had a total of 178.01 miles (286.48 km) of roadways, of which 145.39 miles (233.98 km) were maintained by the municipality, 19.33 miles (31.11 km) by Hunterdon County and 13.29 miles (21.39 km) by the New Jersey Department of Transportation.

Several roads and highways pass through the township. These include Interstate 78, U.S. Route 202, Route 22 and Route 31.

=== Public transportation ===
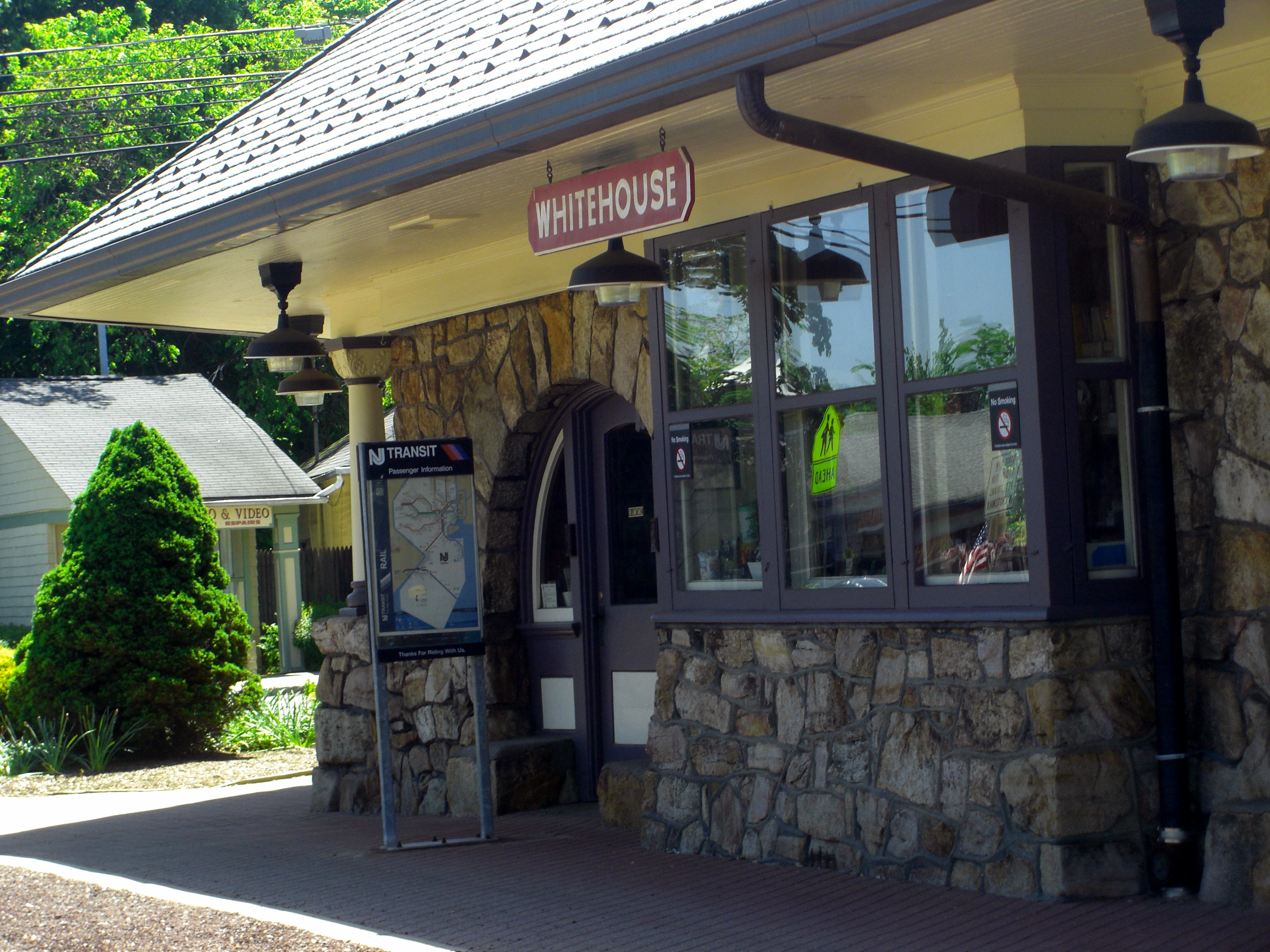
White House Station

The township is also served by NJ Transit's White House station, offering service on the Raritan Valley Line to Newark Penn Station and Hoboken Terminal, with connecting service to Penn Station New York in Midtown Manhattan.

NJ Transit provides local bus service on the 884 route.

The Hunterdon County LINK provide local bus service on Routes 17 / 18 between Milford and Clinton; and Route 23 between Flemington and Bridgewater Commons Mall / Somerville.

=== Rail service ===
The Norfolk Southern Railway's Lehigh Line (formerly the mainline of the Lehigh Valley Railroad), runs through Readington Township.

The Black River and Western Railroad is a freight and heritage railroad that runs from Lambertville via Ringoes and Flemington to Three Bridges (Readington) where it connects to the Norfolk Southern Railway.

== Community ==
An annual event known as the New Jersey Lottery Festival of Ballooning celebrated its 39th anniversary in 2022. The event held at Solberg-Hunterdon Airport is the largest summertime hot air balloon festival in North America.

== FBI shootout ==
On April 5, 2007, a shootout during the attempt to arrest serial bank robbers near a PNC Bank branch on U.S. Route 22 in Readington resulted in the death of FBI agent Barry Lee Bush. Bush was the first FBI agent to be killed in the line of duty in New Jersey and the second FBI agent to be killed by a fellow agent since the bureau was established in 1908.

== Notable people ==
People who were born in, residents of, or otherwise closely associated with Readington Township include:

- Emma Bell (born 1986), actress
- William Cheswick (born c. 1952), computer security and networking researcher, co-author of Firewalls and Internet Security and started the Internet Mapping Project
- Jack Cust (born 1979), a professional baseball player who played for the Oakland Athletics
- Bergen Davis (1869–1958), physicist
- John De Mott (1790–1870), US Congressman from New York State from 1845 to 1847
- Isaac G. Farlee (1787–1855), member of the United States House of Representatives from New Jersey's 3rd Congressional District from 1843 to 1845
- Taissa Farmiga (born 1994), actress
- J. C. Furnas (1906–2001), freelance writer and social historian
- Robert Greifeld (born 1957), CEO NASDAQ OMX Group
- John Knowles Herr (1878–1955), Major General and career American soldier who served for 40 years in the United States Cavalry
- Jonathan Jennings (1784–1834), first Governor of Indiana, serving from 1816 to 1822
- Robyn Kenney (born 1979), field hockey player
- George H. Large (1850–1939), President of the New Jersey Senate who was the last survivor of the first collegiate football game, played in 1869
- Howard Lindsay (1889–1968), theatrical producer, playwright, librettist, director and actor
- Tom Malloy (born 1974), actor and filmmaker
- William Marchant (1923–1995), playwright and screenwriter, best known for writing the play that served as the basis for the 1957 Walter Lang movie, The Desk Set
- Ed Martin, politician who served as Chair of the Missouri Republican Party
- Mallory McMorrow (born 1986), politician who has served in the Michigan Senate since January 2019
- Timothy Piazza (1997–2017), Pennsylvania State University student who was killed as a result of hazing taken place at Beta Theta Pi fraternity
- James N. Pidcock (1836–1899), politician who represented New Jersey's 4th congressional district in the United States House of Representatives from 1885 to 1889
- Martha M. Place (1849–1899), first woman to die in the electric chair
- Donna Simon (born 1960), politician who has served in the New Jersey General Assembly since 2012, representing the 16th Legislative District
- Dorothy Stickney (1896–1998), Broadway actress
