= Centerville, Hunterdon County, New Jersey =

Populated place in Hunterdon County, New Jersey, US

Centerville, New Jersey
- Unincorporated community

- Location of Centerville in Hunterdon County Inset: Location of county within the state of New Jersey Centerville, New Jersey (New Jersey) Centerville, New Jersey (the United States)
- Coordinates: 40°32′18″N 74°45′15″W
- Country: United States
- State: New Jersey
- County: Hunterdon
- Township: Readington
- Elevation: 108 ft (33 m)
- GNIS feature ID: 875336

Centerville was a hamlet within Readington Township in Hunterdon County, in the U.S. state of New Jersey. The community was located along Campbell's Brook (now Pleasant Run) and Old York Road. Centerville grew up because of a tavern that marked the halfway point on the long Swift Sure Stage Line route from New York to Philadelphia. The hamlet had a school, a store, a post office, a church and blacksmith. When the railroads and newer roads were built, Centerville saw few visitors and today all the buildings there are residences.
