= Rowland's Mills, New Jersey =

Populated place in Hunterdon County, New Jersey, US

- Unincorporated community
- Location of Rowland's Mills in Hunterdon County Inset: Location of county within the state of New Jersey Rowland's Mills, New Jersey (New Jersey) Rowland's Mills, New Jersey (the United States)
- Coordinates: 40°33′24″N 74°51′14″W
- Country: United States
- State: New Jersey
- County: Hunterdon
- Township: Readington
- Elevation: 131 ft (40 m)
- GNIS feature ID: 879845

Rowland's Mills or Rowland Mills is an unincorporated community located on the western edge of Readington Township in Hunterdon County, in the U.S. state of New Jersey. In 1760, a gristmill was erected at this site, followed by a sawmill around the time of the American Revolutionary War. A hamlet grew up around the mill complex in the early 19th century along the road connecting Flemington and Clinton. In 1838, Rynear Rowland (1798-1862), whom the village was later named after, purchased the mills. At its peak the settlement had a store, a blacksmith shop owned by Oliver Hart Ewing and numerous houses. In the later part of the 19th century the community diminished in size and was all but abandoned in the 1920s when the road through it was widened and designated as State Route 30, the predecessor of modern New Jersey Route 31.

The Norfolk Southern Railway's Lehigh Line (formerly the mainline of the Lehigh Valley Railroad), runs through the community.
