= Stanton, New Jersey =

Populated place in Hunterdon County, New Jersey, US

- Unincorporated community
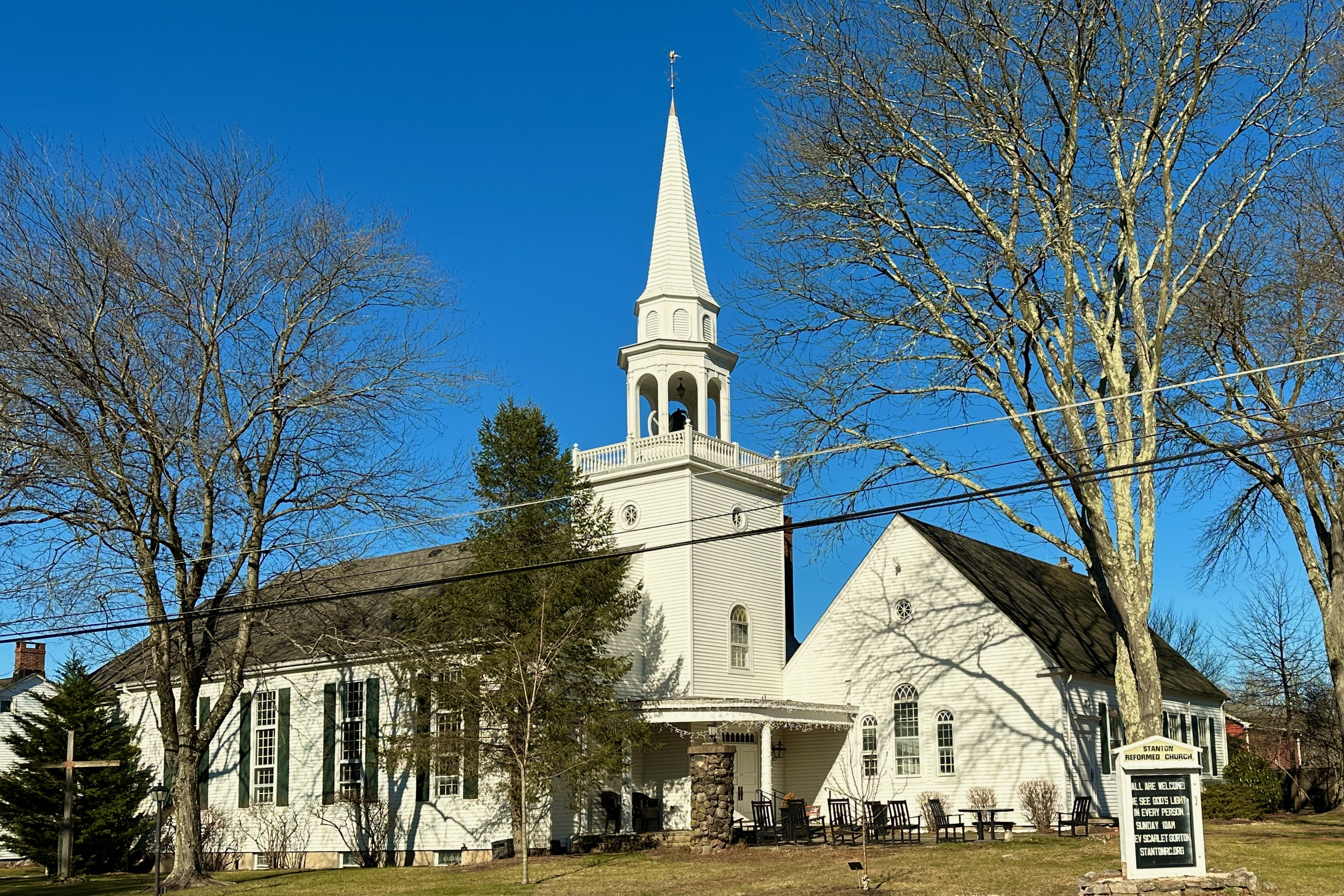
- Stanton Reformed Church

- Location of Stanton in Hunterdon County Inset: Location of county within the state of New Jersey Stanton (New Jersey) Stanton (the United States)
- Coordinates: 40°34′30″N 74°50′16″W
- Country: United States
- State: New Jersey
- County: Hunterdon
- Township: Readington
- Elevation: 361 ft (110 m)
- ZIP Code: 08885
- GNIS feature ID: 880851

Stanton is an unincorporated community located within Readington Township in Hunterdon County, in the U.S. state of New Jersey. The community dates back to the 17th century and was settled by Dutch immigrants.

== History ==
- Stanton Historic Rural District
- U.S. National Register of Historic Places
- U.S. Historic district
- New Jersey Register of Historic Places
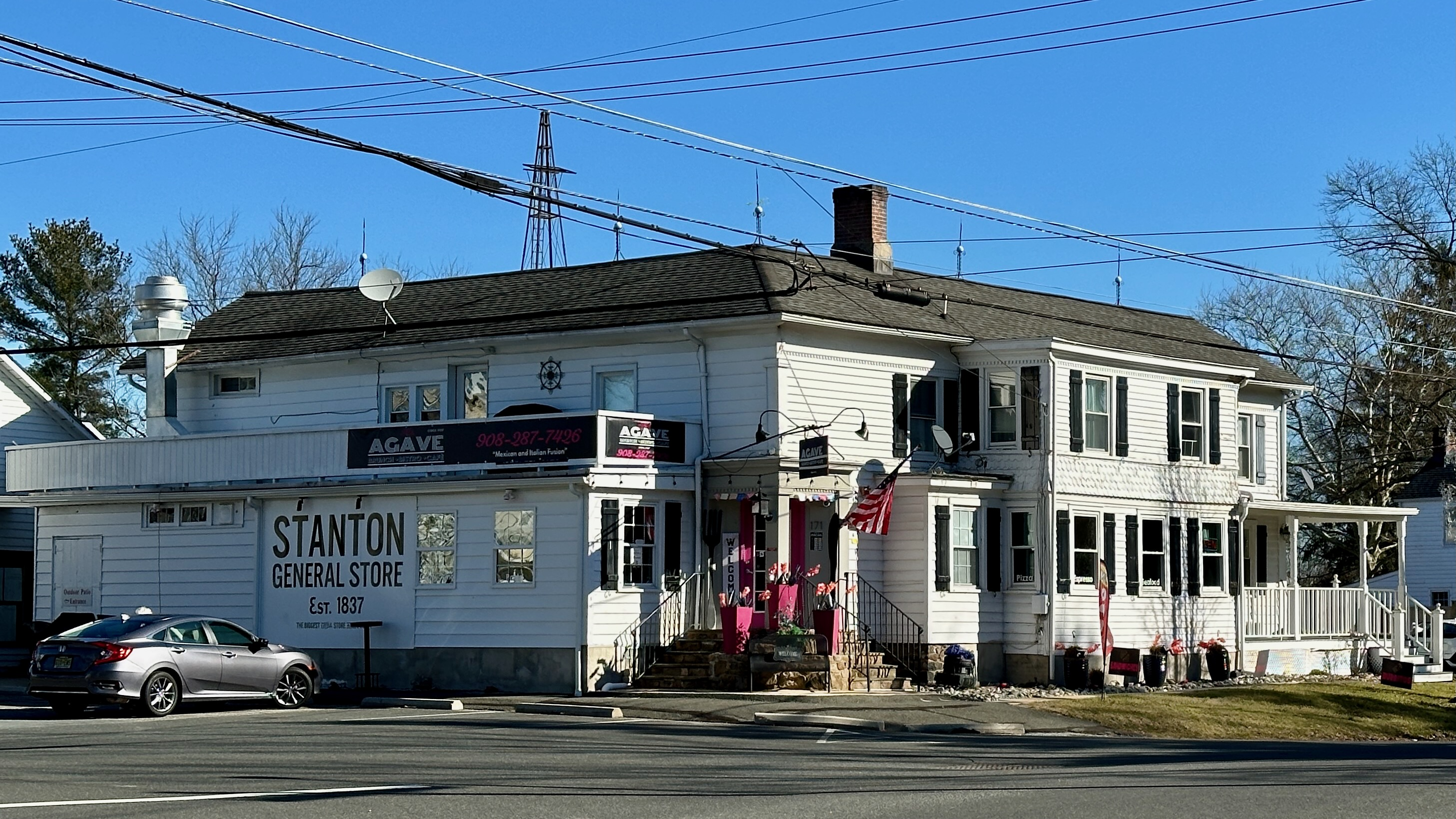
- Stanton General Store
- Location: Stanton and Mountain roads
- Area: 334 acres (135 ha)
- NRHP reference No.: 90001225
- NJRHP No.: 1624

Significant dates
- Added to NRHP: August 10, 1990
- Designated NJRHP: February 24, 1990

The community was originally called Housel's after Johannes Housel, who had a farmstead along Dreahook Road in the mid-18th century. After the death of William Housel (who started a school in the community), the last owner of the Housel farmstead, it then carried the name of Waggoner's Hill after landowner William Waggoner. The community took the descriptive name of Mount Pleasant in the early 20th century and would finally become known as Stanton to distinguish it from another Mount Pleasant. The name "Stanton" was taken from James Logan's Pennsylvania estate: Stenton, which in turn is named for the Scottish village where his father was born. Logan was a proprietor of West Jersey, a mayor of Philadelphia, and a Chief Justice of the Supreme Court of Pennsylvania. Logan Way in Readington is named after him, as well as Logan Circle and the Logan neighborhood in Philadelphia and Logan Township in Clinton County, Pennsylvania.

Most of the community is part of the Stanton Historic Rural District. The 334-acre (135 ha) historic district was added to the National Register of Historic Places on August 10, 1990, for its significance in architecture, and exploration/settlement. The district includes 63 contributing buildings. The Stanton Reformed Church was built in 1963, to replace the original church of 1834. The parsonage was built in the 1850s and features Greek Revival style. The General Store was built in the 1840s and now includes a restaurant. The P. Berkow House was built in the 1840s. The Dr. William Creveling House was built in the 1850s and features Victorian architecture.

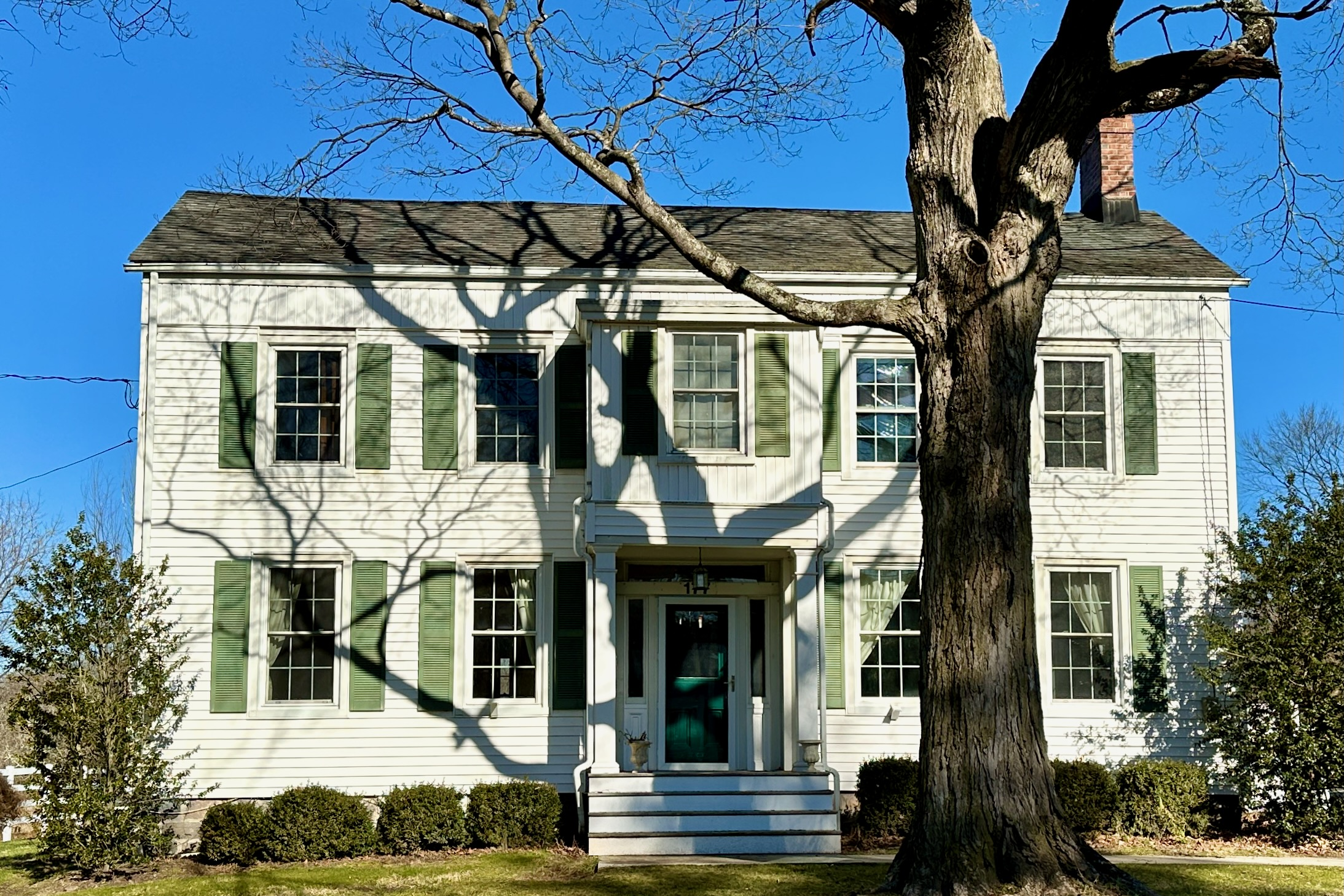
Stanton Reformed Church parsonage

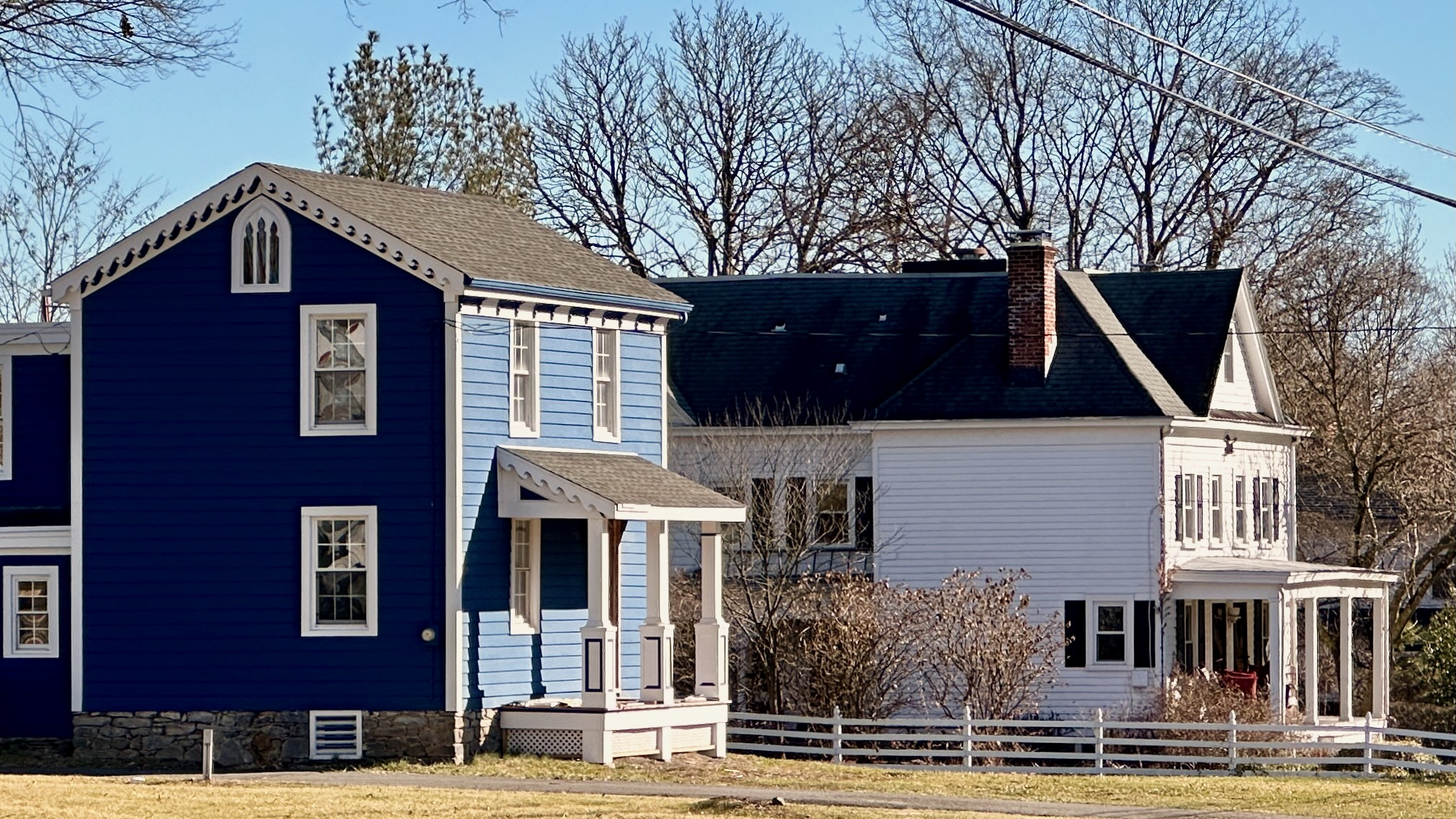
The P. Berkow House and the Dr. William Creveling House
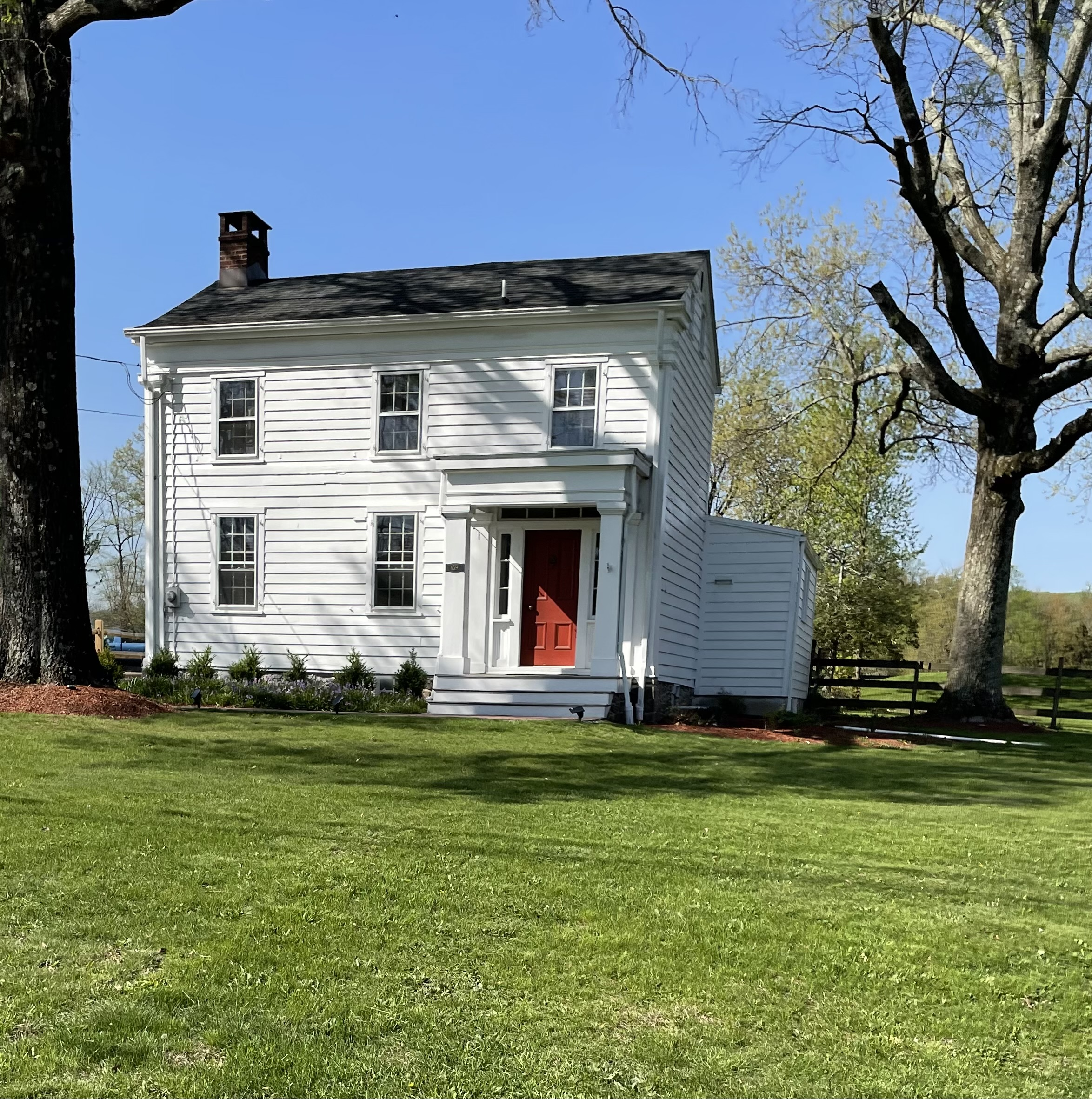
The W. Waggoner house. Contributing property of the Stanton Historic Rural District.

== Notable people ==
People who were born in, residents of, or otherwise closely associated with Stanton include:

- Emma Bell (born 1986), actress.
- J. C. Furnas (1906–2001), freelance writer and social historian.
- Howard Lindsey (1889–1968), theatrical producer, playwright, librettist, director and actor.
- William Marchant (1923–1995), playwright and screenwriter, known for writing the play that was remade into the 1957 movie, The Desk Set.
- Dorothy Stickney (1896–1998), Broadway actress.

== Climate ==
The climate in this area is characterized by hot, humid summers and generally mild to cool winters. According to the Köppen Climate Classification system, Stanton has a humid subtropical climate, abbreviated "Cfa" on climate maps.
