= J. C. Furnas =

American writer (1905–2001)

- Born: November 24, 1905; Indianapolis, Indiana
- Died: June 3, 2001 (aged 95); Stanton, New Jersey
- Occupation: Freelance writer

Joseph Chamberlain Furnas (November 24, 1905 – June 3, 2001) was an American freelance writer.

Furnas is best known for his article, commissioned for the Reader's Digest, "---And Sudden Death!" This article brought national attention to the problem of automobile safety, and is the most-reprinted article in the Digest's history.

His other works include a trilogy of social histories of the United States, The Americans (covering the period 1570–1914), Great Times (covering the period 1914–1929) and Stormy Weather: Crosslights on the 1930s (which covers the time between the stock market crash and the attack on Pearl Harbor.)

The Life and Times of the Late Demon Rum purports to be the only "wet" history of the temperance movement; it covers Temperance from its earliest beginnings late in the eighteenth century up to the passage of the Eighteenth Amendment and national prohibition. It is a useful work for those who wish to understand the context within which the temperance and prohibition movements operated; Furnas studies these movements' leaders and neither glosses over their virtues nor their shortcomings.

Two of his books, The Road to Harper's Ferry and Goodbye to Uncle Tom, deal with African American issues---The Road to Harper's Ferry is an account of John Brown's raid on Harper's Ferry, which delves into the lives and motivations of the "Secret Six" who gave him a great deal of his support, and Goodbye to Uncle Tom examines how Uncle Tom's Cabin, both as a novel and in its many stage adaptations, has shaped American attitudes towards African Americans and slavery.

In addition to these books, he wrote several books dealing with the South Pacific, including a biography of Robert Louis Stevenson, as well as several novels.

He is credited with uncovering the truth behind the Lillian Hellman short story, "Julia," later made into a movie starring Jane Fonda and Vanessa Redgrave. Hellman claimed the story was a true if veiled account drawn from the life of her childhood friend "Julia," a doctor trained in Vienna as a psychotherapist and an anti-Nazi. In fact, the story was taken from the life of Muriel Gardiner, a friend of J.C. Furnas's wife. He documents the story in his autobiography.

== Biography ==
Furnas was born in Indiana on November 24, 1905. He was educated at Harvard University. During World War II he served as a war correspondent; his age, poor vision and Quaker background all combined to keep him from actual military service.

Furnas died on June 3, 2001, at his home in the Stanton section of Readington Township, New Jersey.
