= Darts Mills, New Jersey =

Populated place in Hunterdon County, New Jersey, US

- Unincorporated community
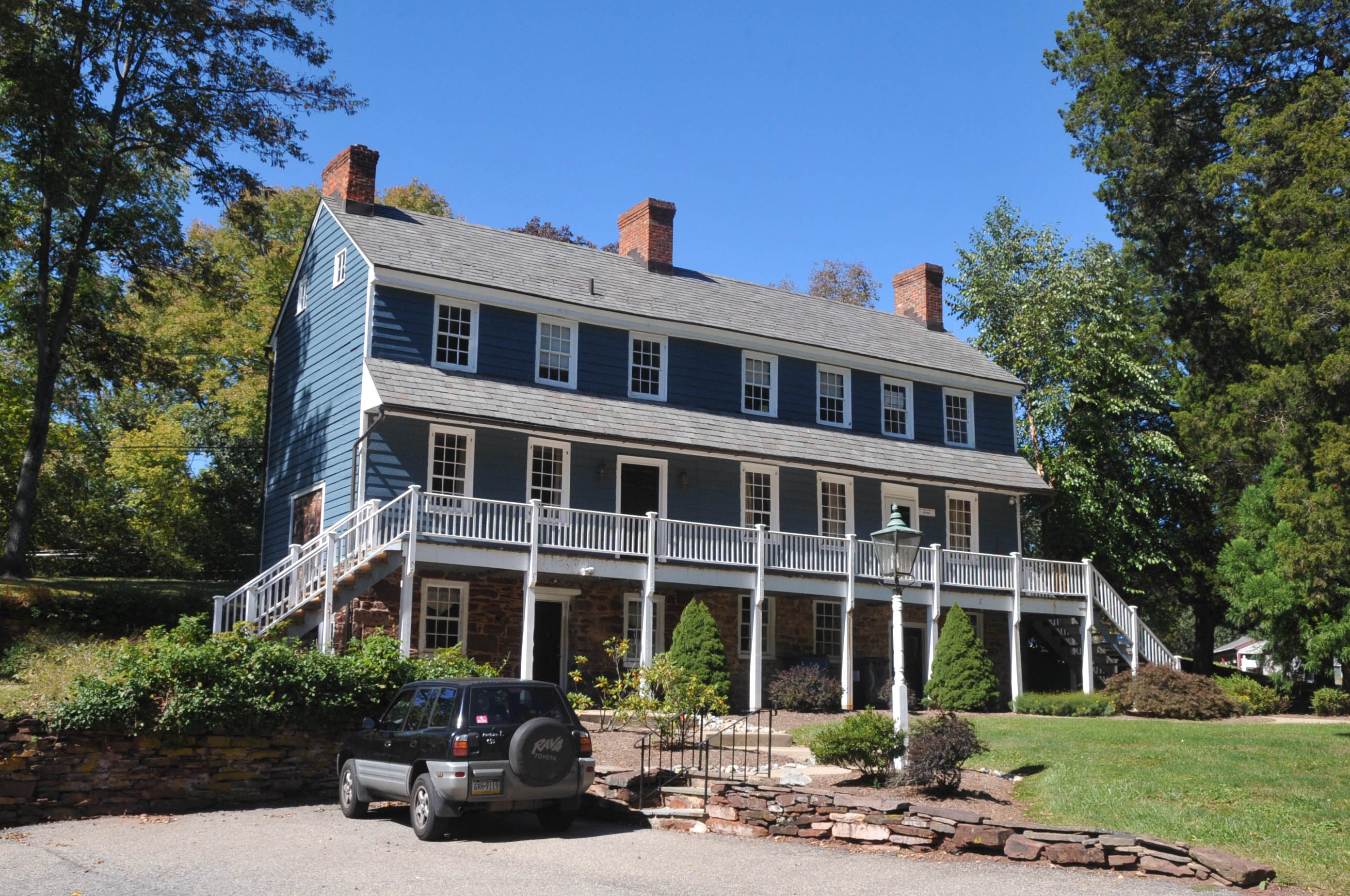
- Hicks House, listed on the National Register of Historic Places

- Location of Darts Mills in Hunterdon County Inset: Location of county within the state of New Jersey Darts Mills (New Jersey) Darts Mills (the United States)
- Coordinates: 40°32′20″N 74°50′02″W
- Country: United States
- State: New Jersey
- County: Hunterdon
- Township: Readington
- Elevation: 144 ft (44 m)
- GNIS feature ID: 875804

Darts Mills is a historic unincorporated community located within Readington Township in Hunterdon County, in the U.S. state of New Jersey. It is located on the South Branch of the Raritan River, and several mills were built there in the early 18th century. At its height, a merchant, blacksmith, store and complex of mills were here. The last mill at this site burnt down in 1994. Foundation walls and a mill race remain at the site today.

== Historic district ==
- Dart's Mill Historic District
- U.S. National Register of Historic Places
- U.S. Historic district
- New Jersey Register of Historic Places
- Area: 5 acres (2.0 ha)
- NRHP reference No.: 82003279
- NJRHP No.: 1613

Significant dates
- Added to NRHP: April 29, 1982
- Designated NJRHP: March 18, 1981

The Dart's Mill Historic District is a 5-acre (2.0 ha) historic district encompassing the community. It was added to the National Register of Historic Places on April 29, 1982, for its significance in architecture and industry. The district includes 4 contributing buildings, 5 contributing sites, and 3 contributing structures.

The Hicks House is a two-story frame building. It was likely the home for the owner or the foreman of the mill. The Mill house was likely used by another mill worker and may have contained a shop.

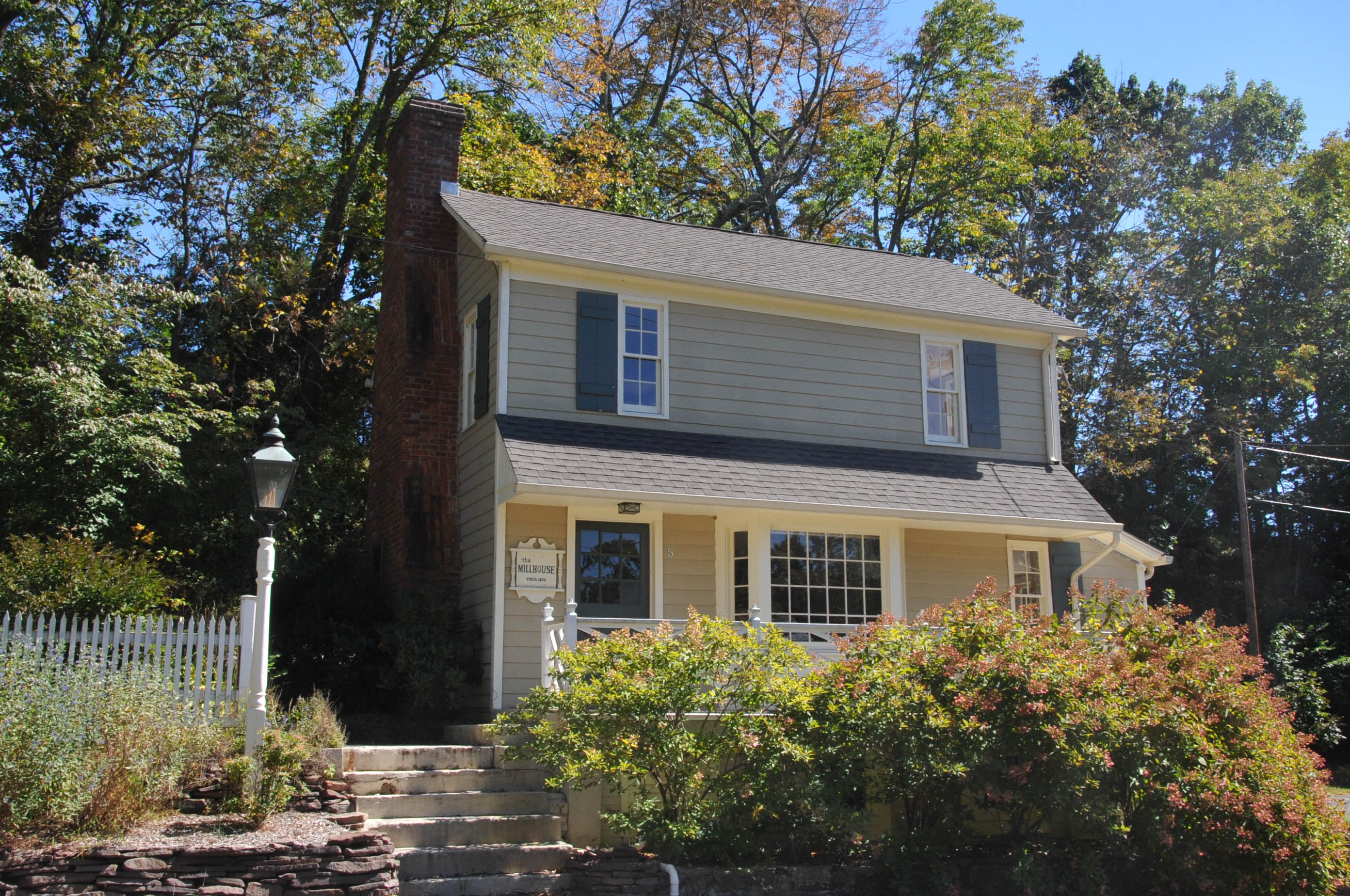
Mill house

== See also ==
- National Register of Historic Places listings in Hunterdon County, New Jersey
