= Pleasant Run, New Jersey =

Populated place in Hunterdon County, New Jersey, US

- Unincorporated community
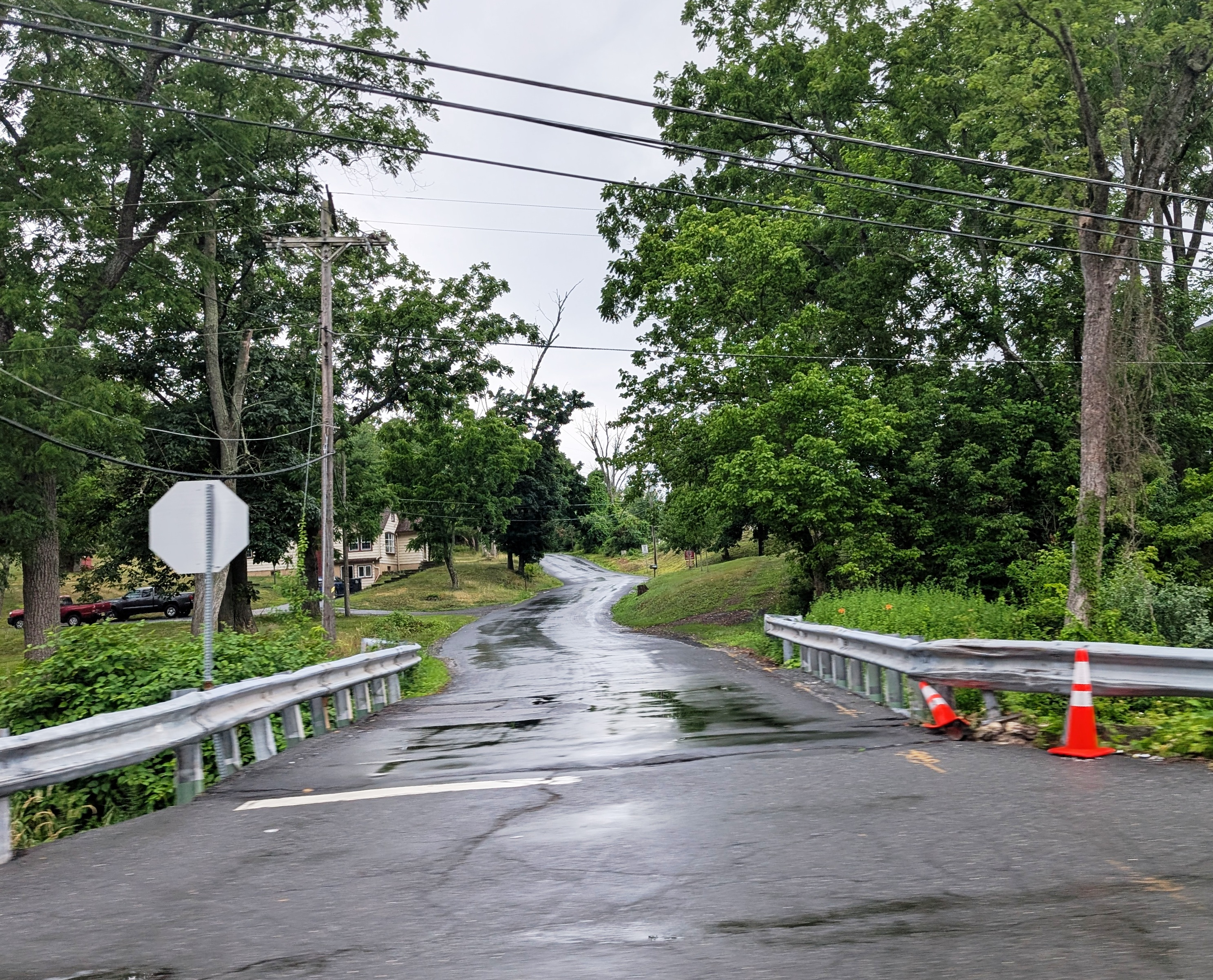
- Barley Sheaf Road in Pleasant Run

- Location of Pleasant Run in Hunterdon County Inset: Location of county within the state of New Jersey Pleasant Run, New Jersey (New Jersey) Pleasant Run, New Jersey (the United States)
- Coordinates: 40°33′41″N 74°47′35″W
- Country: United States
- State: New Jersey
- County: Hunterdon
- Township: Readington
- Elevation: 141 ft (43 m)
- GNIS feature ID: 879361

Pleasant Run was a hamlet in Readington Township, Hunterdon County, in the U.S. state of New Jersey. Located along Campbell's Brook (now also called Pleasant Run), the hamlet consisted of farms, a schoolhouse and a general store. The brook was named after John Campbell, who purchased the land around it in 1685.
