= Barley Sheaf, New Jersey =

Populated place in Hunterdon County, New Jersey, US

- Unincorporated community
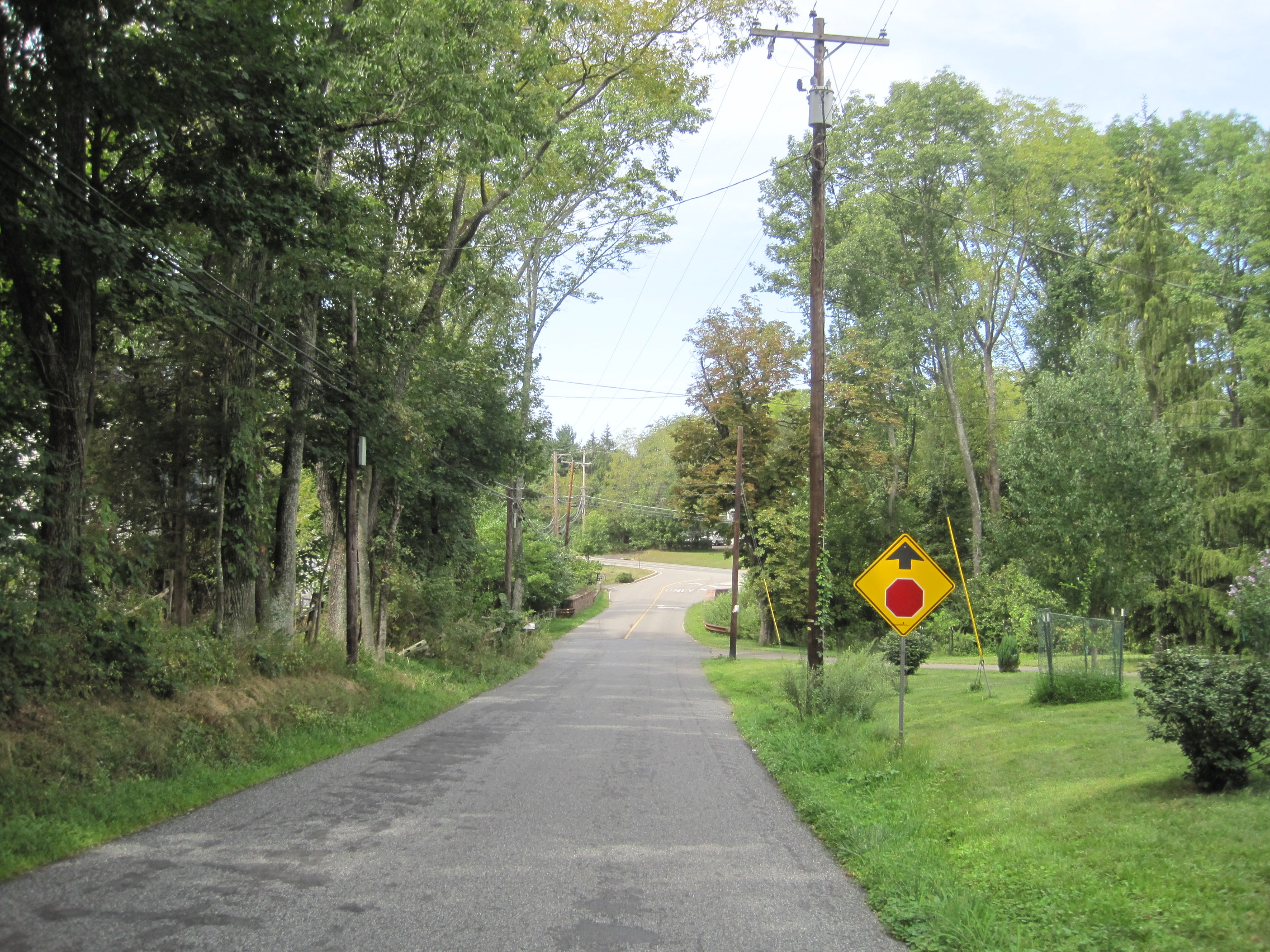
- Looking west along Barley Sheaf Road

- Location of Barley Sheaf in Hunterdon County Inset: Location of county within the state of New Jersey Barley Sheaf, New Jersey (New Jersey) Barley Sheaf, New Jersey (the United States)
- Coordinates: 40°32′45″N 74°49′28″W
- Country: United States
- State: New Jersey
- County: Hunterdon
- Township: Readington
- Elevation: 180 ft (55 m)
- Time zone: UTC−05:00 (Eastern (EST))
  - Summer (DST): UTC−04:00 (EDT)
- GNIS feature ID: 874498

Barley Sheaf was an unincorporated community located within Readington Township in Hunterdon County, in the U.S. state of New Jersey. It was named for the grain once grown in the region. The hamlet was on Barley Sheaf Road between County Route 629 (CR 629) and CR 523. The hamlet at one time housed a general store, a post office, blacksmith, creamery, a hotel and numerous farmsteads. Today only farms remain of the hamlet. The hamlet also carried the names of Farmersville and Campbellsville after Catherine Campbell, who ran the hotel in the area.
