= Charles Eversole House =

Historic house in New Jersey, United States

- U.S. National Register of Historic Places
- New Jersey Register of Historic Places
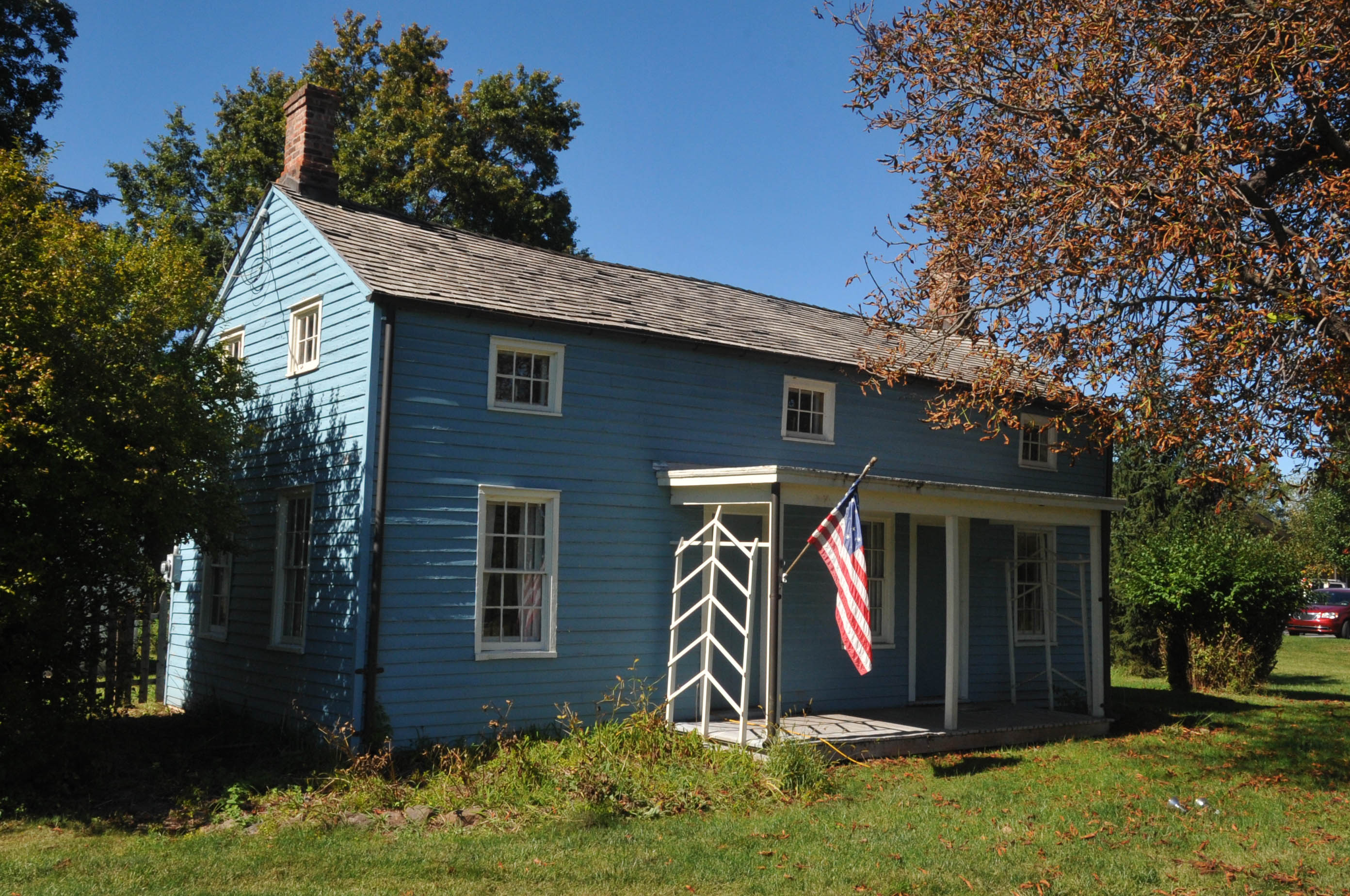

- Location within Hunterdon County, New Jersey Location within New Jersey Location within the United States
- Location: 509 County Road 523, Readington Township, New Jersey
- Nearest city: Whitehouse Station
- Coordinates: 40°35′56″N 74°46′39″W
- Area: 3 acres (1.2 ha)
- Built: 1790
- NRHP reference No.: 05001563
- NJRHP No.: 4302

Significant dates
- Added to NRHP: February 1, 2006
- Designated NJRHP: December 7, 2005

The Charles Eversole House, also known as the Eversole-Hall House, is a historic house located at 509 County Road 523 near Whitehouse Station in Readington Township, Hunterdon County, New Jersey. It was added to the National Register of Historic Places on February 1, 2006, for its significance in architecture. The house was purchased by the township in 1988 for use as a museum, which opened in 1991.

== History ==
The one and one-half story house was built by Charles Eversole, a reed maker, sometime before 1778 and expanded twice by c. 1790. Abraham Hall, a shoemaker, purchased it in 1832 from Eversole's grandson.

== See also ==
- List of museums in New Jersey
