= Pleasant Run (New Jersey) =

Pleasant Run Campbell's Brook
- Etymology: Descriptive Etymology

Location
- Country: United States
- State: New Jersey
- Region: Raritan Valley
- City: Readington, Branchburg

Physical characteristics
- Source: Cushetunk Mountain
  - location: Readington, Raritan Valley, New Jersey, United States
  - coordinates: 40°32′1.32″N 74°49′5.52″W
  - elevation: 312 ft (95 m)
- Mouth: South Branch Raritan River
  - location: Branchburg, Raritan Valley, New Jersey, United States
  - coordinates: 40°31′4.8″N 74°43′44.76″W
  - elevation: 75 ft (23 m)
- Length: 7 mi (11 km)

Pleasant Run is a tributary of the South Branch Raritan River in central New Jersey in the United States.

Pleasant Run is approximately 7 miles (11 km) in length, running from its headwaters near Cushetunk Mountain, a plutonic intrusion of igneous rock surrounding Round Valley Reservoir, through Readington and Branchburg, to its convergence with the South Branch Raritan River near River Road in Branchburg.

Pleasant Run was originally called Campbell's Brook after John Campbell of Piscataway. Campbell in 1685, was granted a strip of land extending west from the South Branch and which surrounded Pleasant Run.

== Tributaries ==
Pleasant Run has twenty-three small, unnamed tributaries in Branchburg and Readington.

== Crossings ==
Readington

- Springtown Road (4 crossings)
- CR 523/Flemington-Whitehouse Road
- CR 629/Pleasant Run Road
- US 202
- Old York Road

Branchburg

- Otto Road
- Pleasant Run Road
- South Branch Road

== See also ==
- List of rivers of New Jersey
