= Hunterdon County LINK =

Bus system in Hunterdon County, NJ

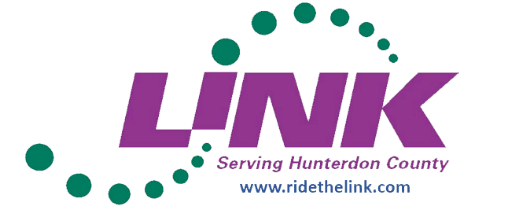
- Parent: Hunterdon County Department of Human Services
- Founded: 1984
- Commenced operation: 1984
- Headquarters: 8 Gauntt Pl, Flemington, NJ 08822
- Service area: Hunterdon County, NJ
- Service type: Fixed Route, Demand Response
- Routes: 8 routes
- Hubs: Flemington LINK Bus Transfer Center; Park Av & Capner St, Flemington, NJ 08822
- Fleet: Minibuses
- Annual ridership: 94,765
- Operator: Easton Coach Company
- Website: Official website

The Hunterdon County LINK is a bus system in Hunterdon County, New Jersey. The system offers fixed-route and demand-response services throughout the county. The system is operated by the Hunterdon County Department of Human Services, and operated by Easton Coach Company. From 2011 to 2020, it was operated by First Transit.

== History ==
The Hunterdon County LINK system started in 1984. From 1984 until 2016, service consisted mainly of demand-response service. The only fixed-route buses were the Flemington Shuffles (routes 16 and 20).

In March 2016, the county's bus system was redesigned. Demand response service was retained, but four new routes (routes 14 through 18), collectively branded as the "Cross County Shuffles," were introduced, replacing key demand response corridors. In addition to this, a new "Out of County Shuffle" route was introduced, the route 23, running from Flemington to Somerville in Somerset County. As a part of this service redesign, the Flemington Shuffles were also modified, with the route 20 (Evening Flemington Shuffle) being removed and the route 19 being added as a reverse run of the route 16. In January 2019, a bus shelter was added to the LINK Transfer Center in Flemington.

== Routes ==
Hunterdon County LINK operates eight routes.

Type of Route	Route number	Termini		Via	Notes
Cross County Shuffle	14	Lambertville; Cherry Street	Flemington; LINK Bus Transfer Center	U.S. Route 202	
Cross County Shuffle	15	Hampton; Hampton Manor	Flemington; LINK Bus Transfer Center	Route 31	
Cross County Shuffle	17	Milford; Milford Market	Clinton; ShopRite/Walmart	Route 12, County Road 523, U. S. Route 22	
Cross County Shuffle	18	Milford; Milford Market	Clinton; ShopRite/Walmart	Route 12, County Road 523, U. S. Route 22	
Flemington Shuffle	16	Flemington; Hunterdon Mews	Flemington; LINK Bus Transfer Center	Flemington Loop	
Flemington Shuffle	19	Flemington; Hunterdon Mews	Raritan Township; Hunterdon Medical Center	Flemington Loop	
Flemington Shuffle	21	Flemington; Hunterdon Mews	Raritan Township; Stop & Shop	Flemington Loop	Saturday service only
Out of County Shuffle	23	Somerville; NJT Station	Flemington; LINK Bus Transfer Center	U. S. Route 22, U. S. Route 202	

In addition, demand response service is operated throughout the county.

== Fleet ==
Hunterdon County LINK currently operates exclusively minibuses. In the past, however, full-size buses have been used.
