= Pleasant Run (painting) =

1885 painting by T. C. Steele

Run Carino
- Pleasant Run (English)
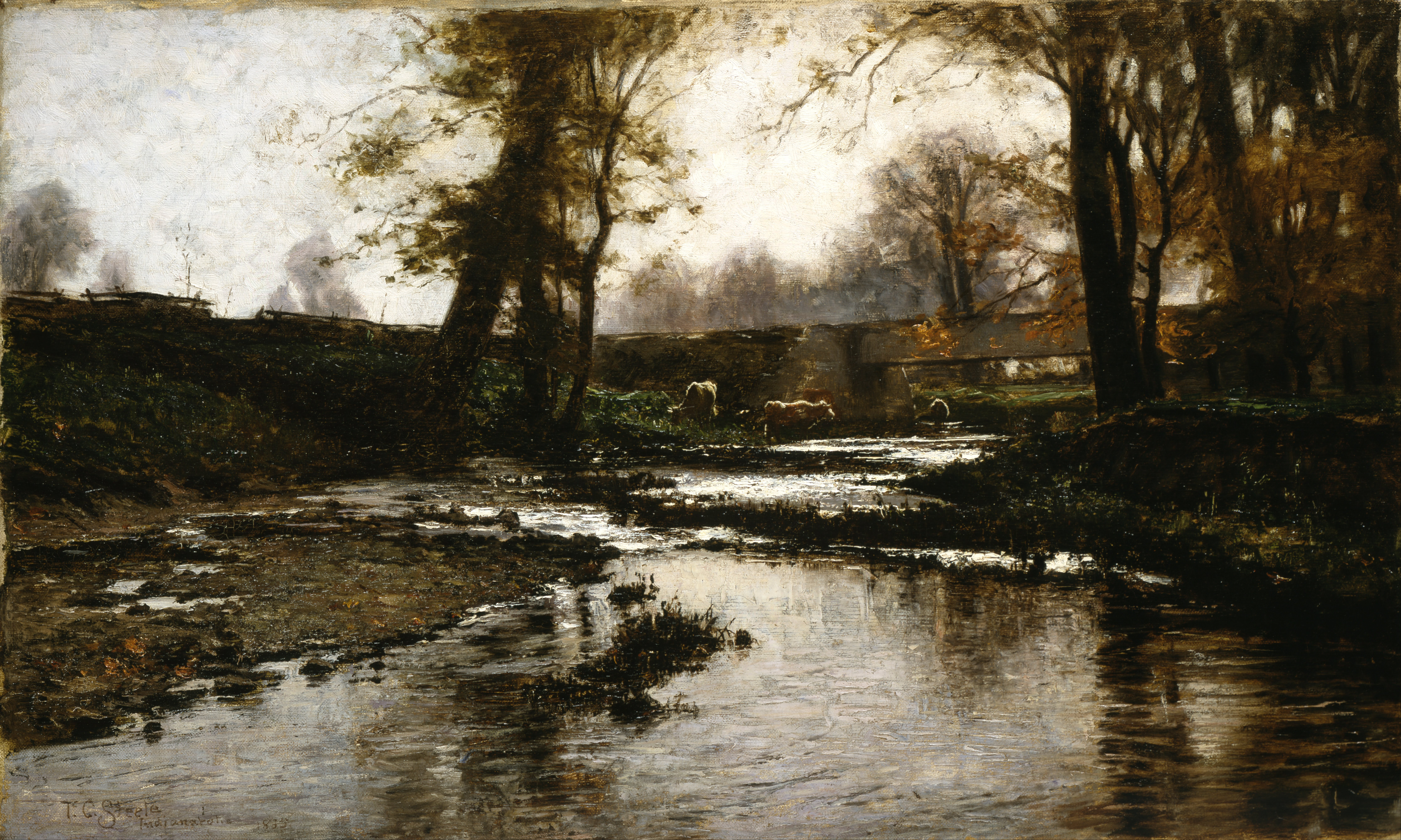
- Artist: T. C. Steele
- Year: 1885
- Medium: Oil on canvas
- Dimensions: 45.72 cm × 66.04 cm (18.00 in × 26.00 in)
- Location: Indianapolis Museum of Art, Indianapolis

Pleasant Run (French: Run Carino) is an oil-on-canvas painting created in 1885 by American Impressionist painter T. C. Steele, the leader of the Hoosier Group, and known for his Indiana landscapes. The dimensions of the painting are 45.72 by 66.04 centimeters. It is housed at the Indianapolis Museum of Art, Indianapolis, Indiana.

Pleasant Run was painted soon after the artist returned from five years of study at the Academy of Fine Arts, Munich, Germany. It portrays an area which at the time defined the eastern and southern limits of Indianapolis.
