= Round Valley Reservoir =

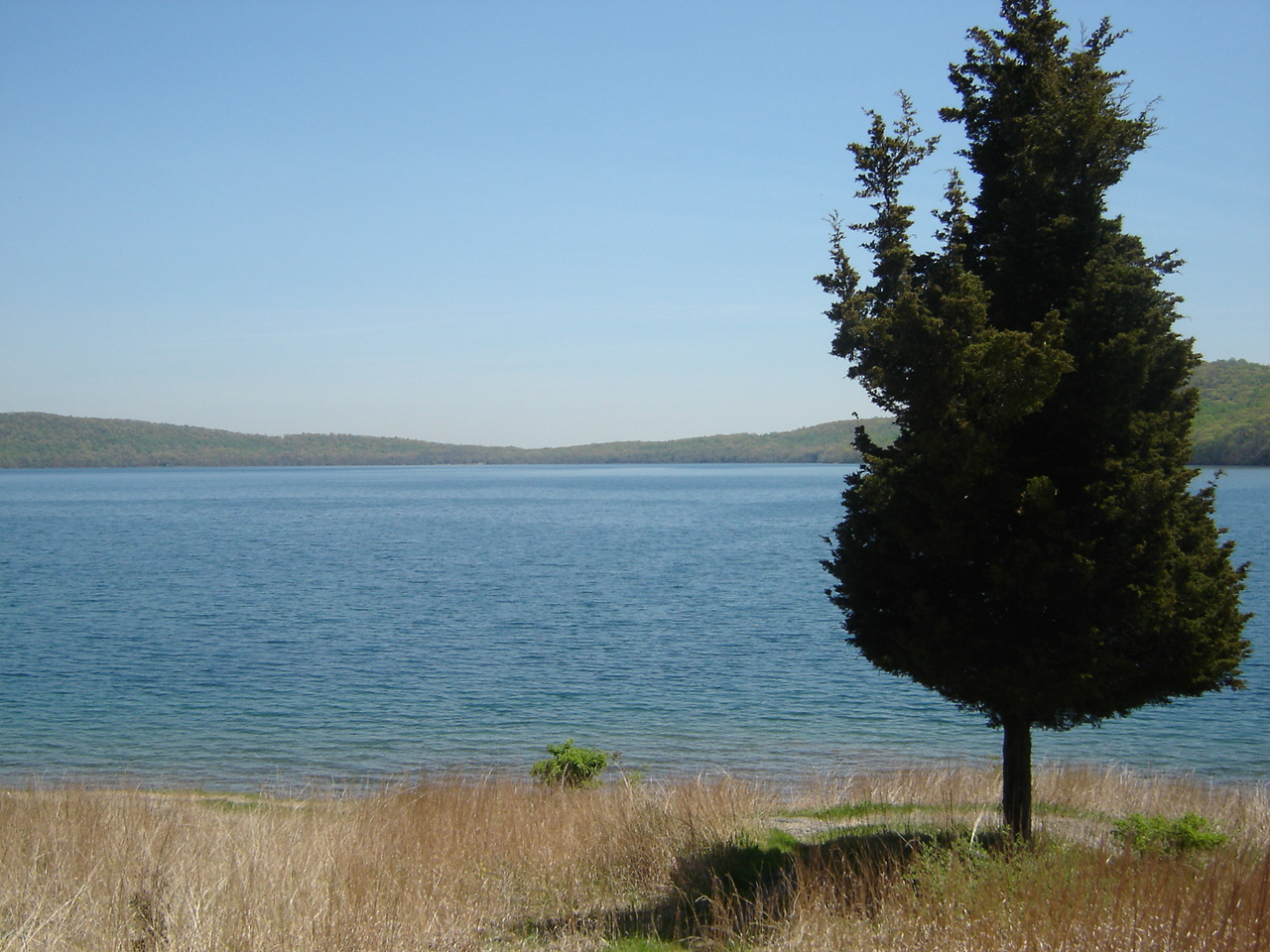

- Location within New Jersey Location within the United States
- Location: Clinton Township, New Jersey
- Coordinates: 40°36′50″N 74°49′22″W
- Type: Reservoir
- Basin countries: United States
- Surface area: over 2,300 acres (9.3 km^{2})
- Max. depth: 180 ft (55 m)
- Water volume: 55,000,000,000 US gal (0.21 km^{3})
- Surface elevation: 381 ft (116 m)

The Round Valley Reservoir in Clinton Township in Hunterdon County, New Jersey, United States, was formed in 1960 when the New Jersey Water Authority constructed two large dams and flooded a large valley. The reservoir is named after the naturally formed circular valley surrounded by Cushetunk Mountain. The deep valley was caused by erosion of the soft sedimentary rock. The surrounding ridges of Cushetunk Mountain endure because they were underlaid with dense and durable volcanic rock diabase that cooled slowly under the surface of the Earth. The reservoir covers what used to be a farming community, with remains of a school and a church on the lake floor among other buildings.

Reaching depths of 180 feet (55 m), this 2,350-acre (9.5 km^{2}) reservoir is best known for its pristine clear blue waters. The reservoir contains 55 billion US gallons (210,000,000 m^{3}) of water for use in central New Jersey, making it the largest in the state. Its water is distributed during times of drought via the nearby south branch of the Raritan River. The New Jersey Division of Fish and Wildlife claims the reservoir is the southernmost body of water in the United States that contains naturally reproducing lake trout. This is one of only two lakes in New Jersey with lake trout, the other being Merrill Creek Reservoir in Warren County. Some of the other species of fish in the lake include bass, pickerel, catfish, american eel, yellow perch, brown trout, and rainbow trout. The park also has a wilderness area for camping, swimming and SCUBA diving facilities, a boat ramp and nature hiking and biking trails.

The reservoir has been called the Bermuda Triangle of New Jersey, and also known as one of the worlds most cursed lakes with over 26 people have drowned there since 1971. Six of them have never been found. In December 2024, several unidentified lights were seen over the reservoir as part of the larger New Jersey drone sightings phenomena.

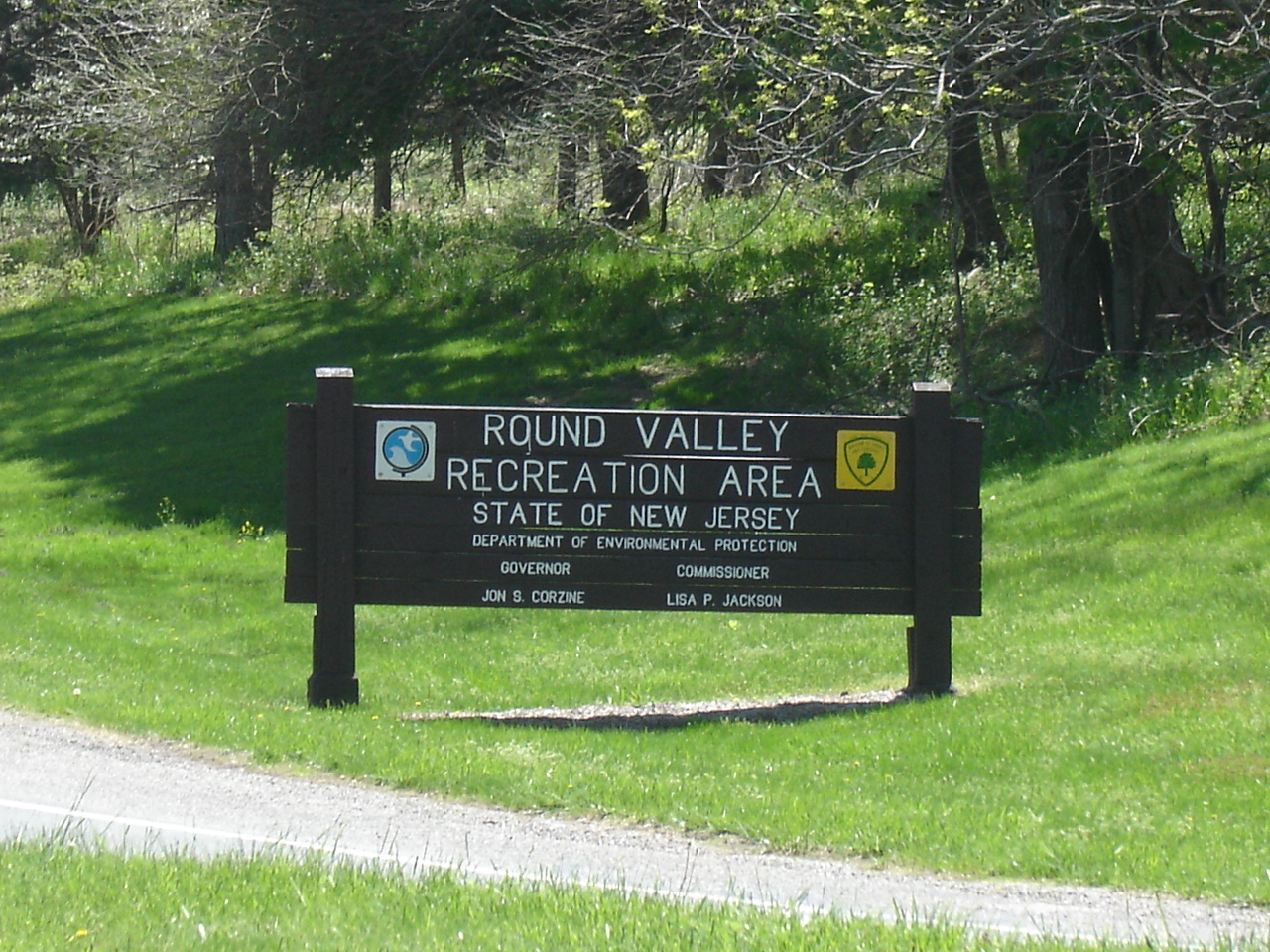
Round Valley Reservoir, Clinton Township, NJ

== Gallery ==
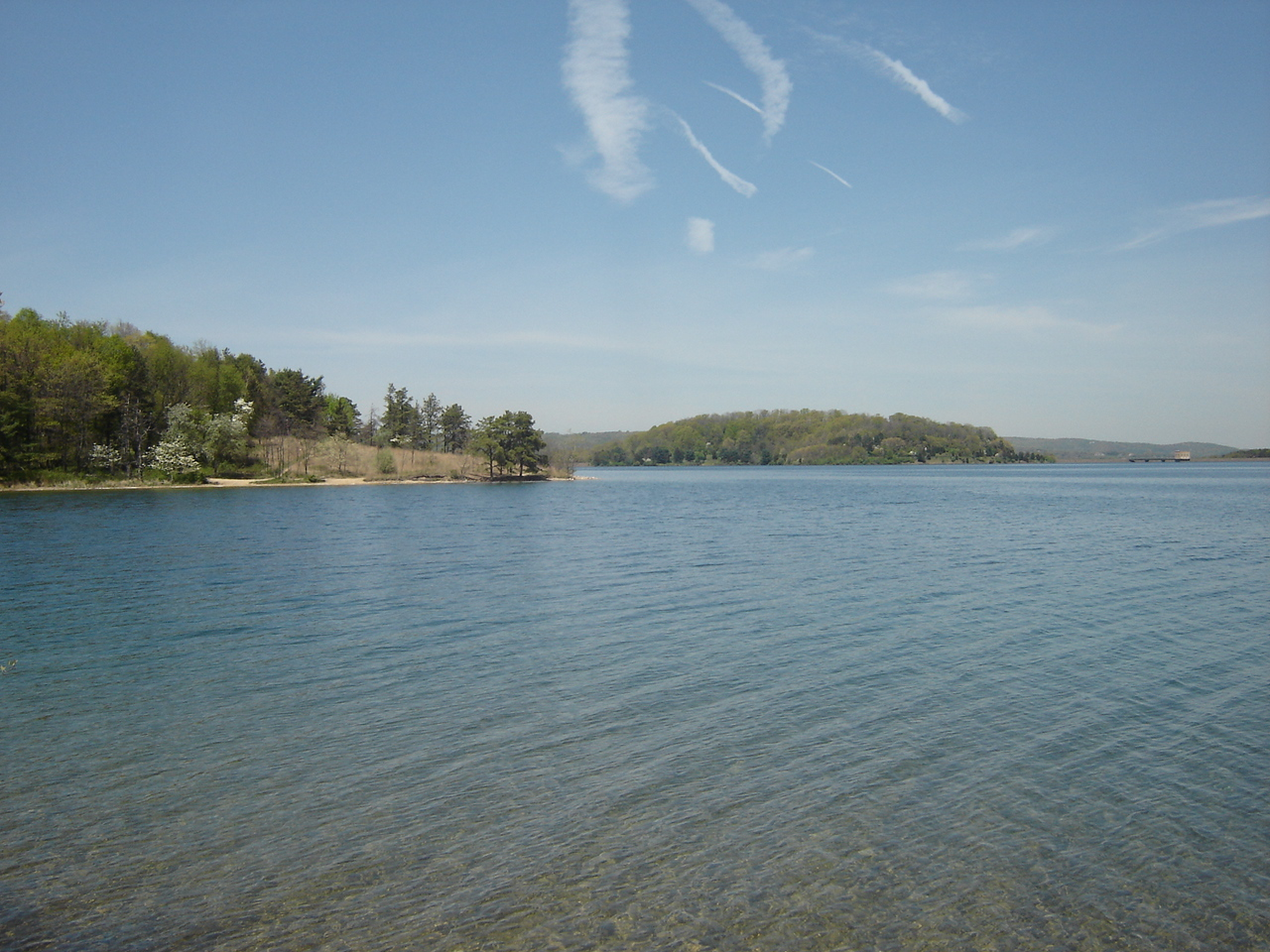
Picture of the Round Valley lake

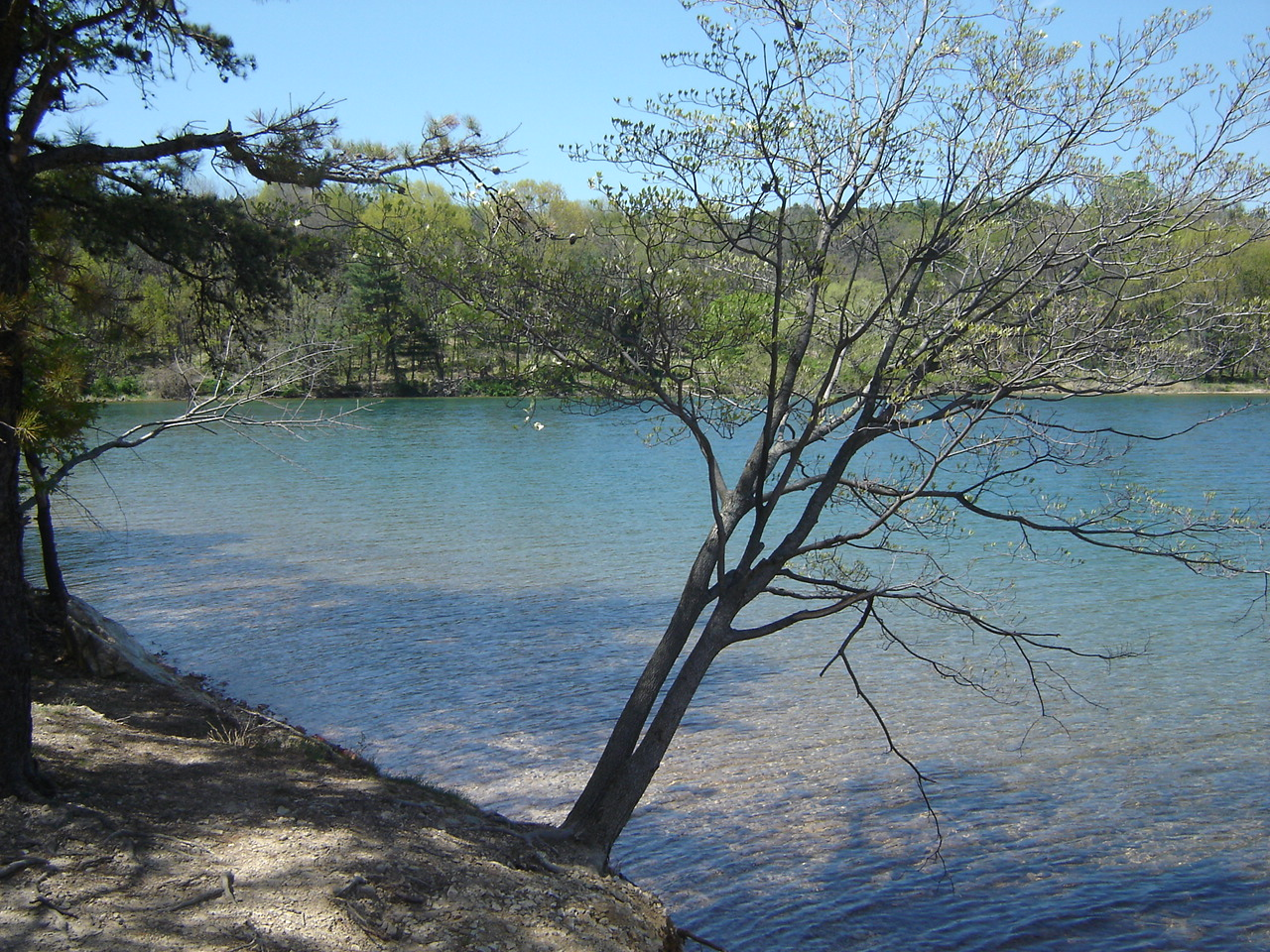
Tree hanging over the edge

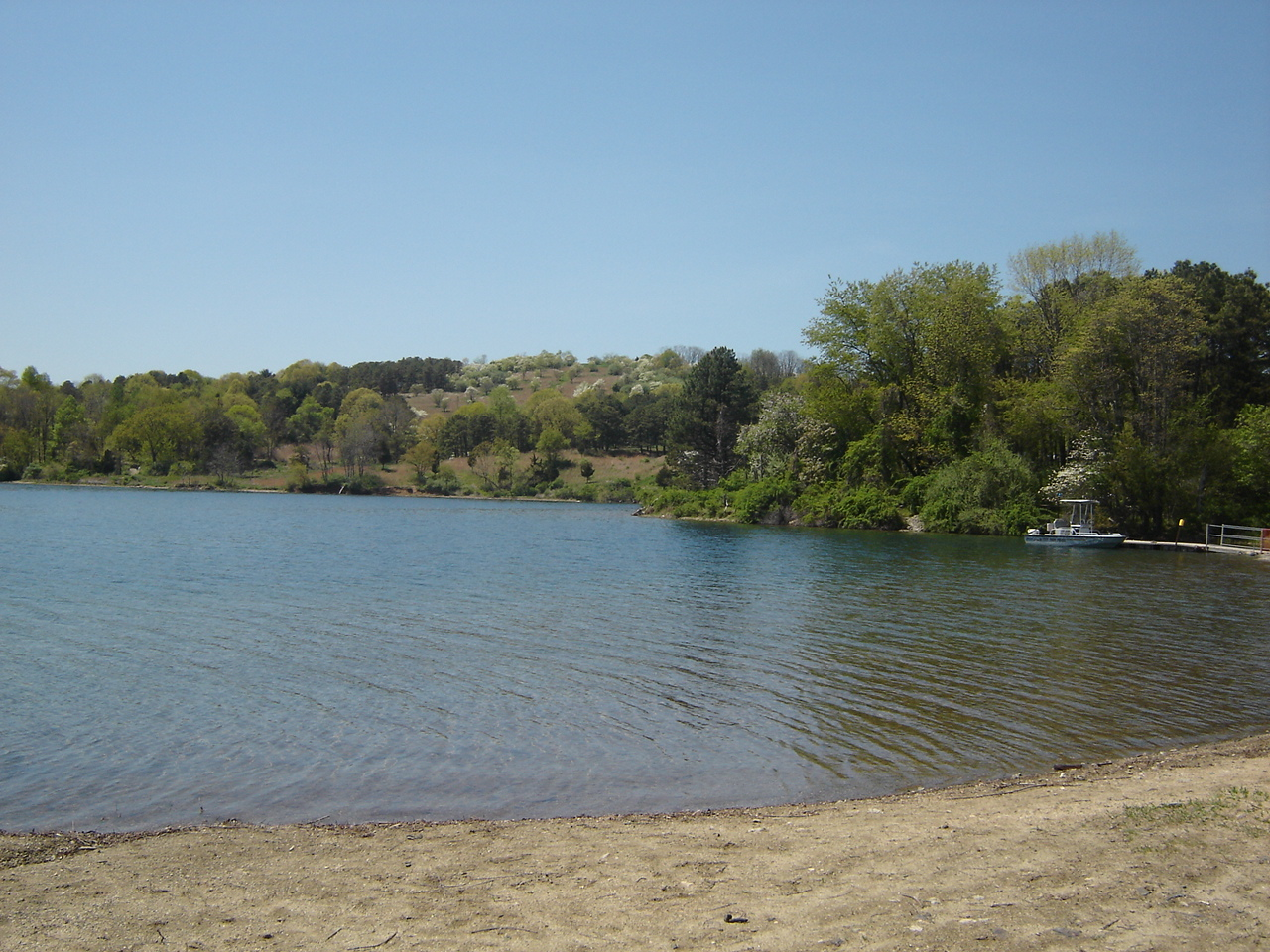
Boat Launch

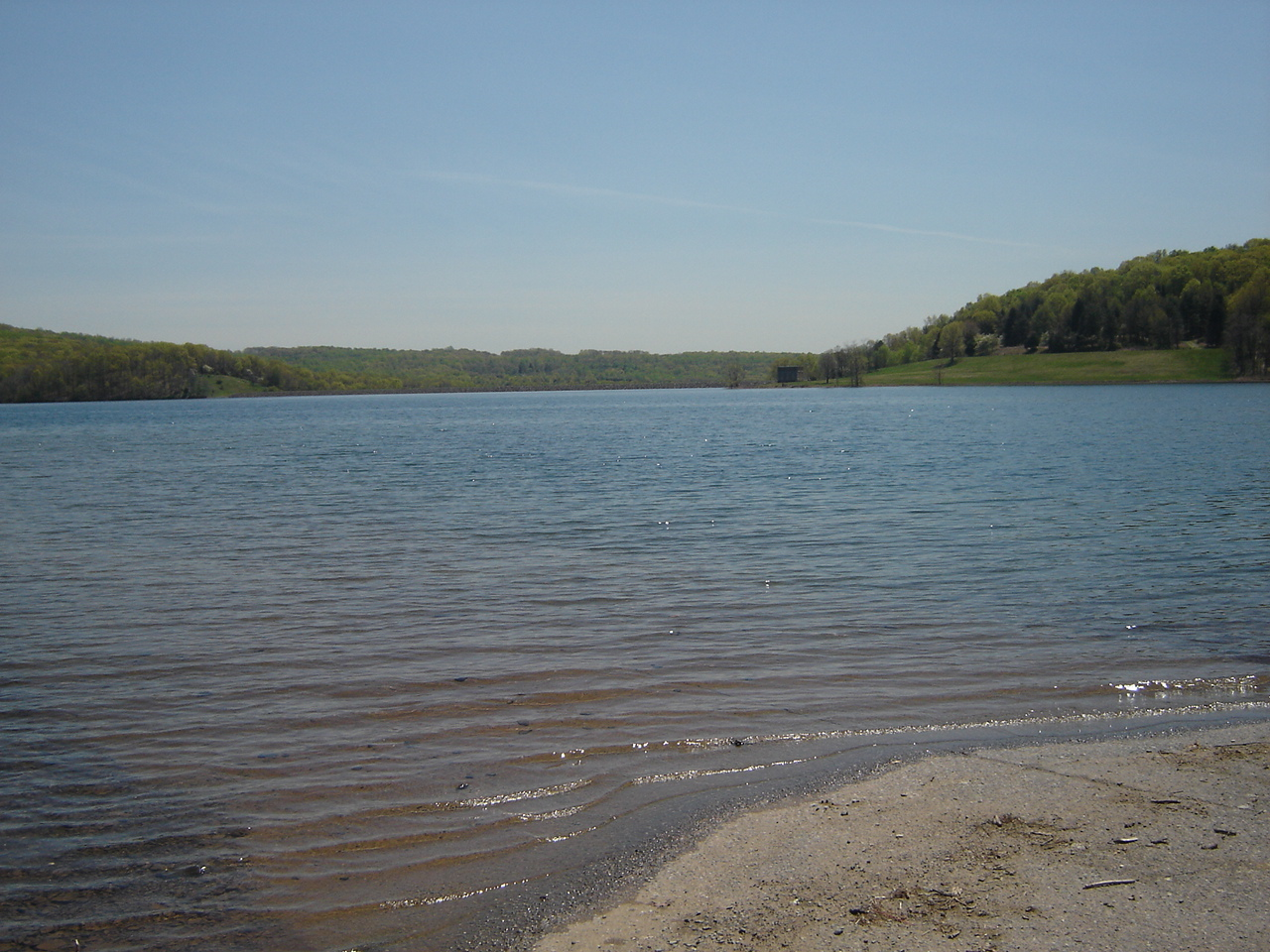
Shoreline

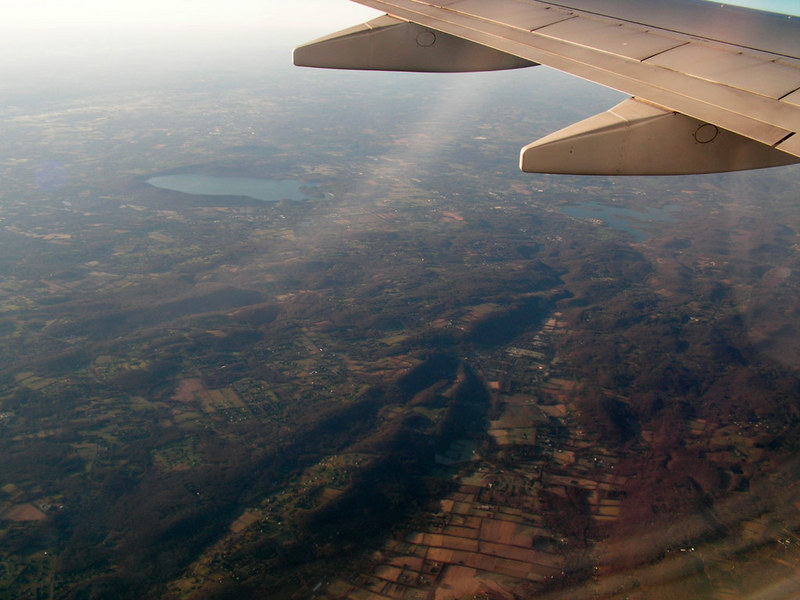
Round Valley and Spruce Run

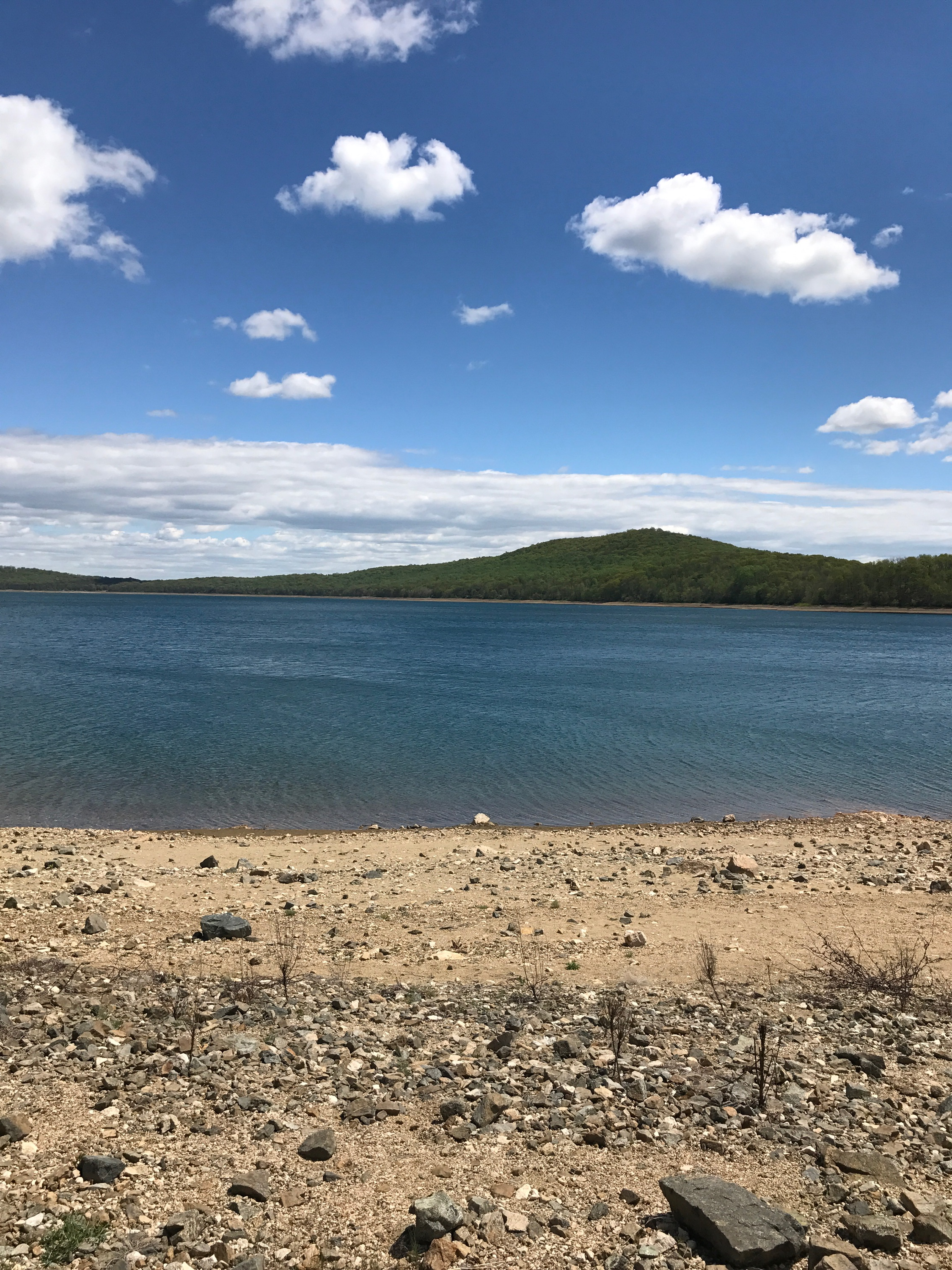
Shoreline

== See also ==
- 2024 New Jersey drone sightings
