= Cushetunk Mountain =

Mountain in New Jersey, US

- Cushetunk Mountain (Round Valley Reservoir)

Highest point
- Elevation: 834 ft (254 m)
- Coordinates: 40°35′55″N 74°49′29″W

Geography
- Location within Hunterdon County, New Jersey
- Location: Hunterdon County, New Jersey, U.S.
- Topo map: USGS Flemington

Geology
- Rock age: 200,000,000 years
- Mountain type: Intrusive igneous / trap rock

Climbing
- Easiest route: Hike

Cushetunk Mountain (formerly Mount Ployden and Pickel's Mountain occasionally Mount Cushetunk or Coshanton) is a ring shaped mountain in the U.S. state of New Jersey, located in Readington and Clinton Township in Hunterdon County. The Lenape Native Americans called the mountain "Cushetunk" meaning "place of hogs" after the wild hogs found there. In the 1960s, the valley at the heart of the mountain was dammed and filled with water to create Round Valley Reservoir. Today, the mountain and its accompanying lake act as a vital water supply to Central New Jersey, while at the same time providing numerous recreational opportunities to the region.

== Geography ==
Cushetunk Mountain, located in Clinton Township, Readington Township, Franklin Township, New Jersey, and Raritan Township, New Jersey is a horseshoe shaped mountain with the tips of its two prongs ending in the west at the edge of the New Jersey Highlands. The mountain's U-shaped arc is approximately 2 miles (3.2 km) in diameter, with the more massive portion of the mountain occupying the southwest corner of the ridgeline. A deep man-made lake, Round Valley Reservoir, occupies the valley at the center of the horseshoe.

Cushetunk Mountain is occasionally referred to as a mountain range and includes Round Mountain, a 610-foot (190 m) peak located about 1.5 miles (2.4 km) south of Cushetunk Mountain in Readington. Round Mountain is linked to Cushetunk Mountain by a sheet of intruded diabase rock running beneath the surface. Located on the mountains are the communities of Cushetunk, Lebanon and Lebanon Borough. In Clinton township the mountains Stretch from the south west part of the township to north central part. Lebanon covers the whole mountain (with the exception of Lebanon Borough an Cushetunk).

== History ==
Before the arrival of Europeans, Cushetunk Mountain was inhabited by Unami speaking Lenape, particularly the Musconetcongs who ranged between Cushetunk Mountain and Sourland Mountain to the south. An interesting claim put forward by Beauchamp Plantagenet, one of the first Europeans to explore the area around the mountain, states that a Native American king held his seat in a place resembling the valley formed by Cushetunk Mountain. The claim exists today as a legend, and no evidence has ever been found confirming Plantagenet's story of a ‘Raritan king’.

Two famous names from New Jersey's colonial history owned land on the north slope of Cushetunk Mountain in Potterstown (part of Readington and Clinton Township). One was John Stevens, a delegate to the Continental Congress, whose grandson founded Stevens Institute of Technology. The other was Lord Stirling, an American Revolutionary War General who was ranked 3rd or 4th behind George Washington.

Historically, wildlife at the mountain included apex predators that are no longer found in the region. A story from the colonial era involving Dr. John Rockhill, a member of the Society of Friends and supposedly Hunterdon's County's first physician, indicates that Cushetunk Mountain and neighboring Round Mountain were known to harbor wolves. It is also noted that settlers in nearby Flemington had to defend against these wolves during the winter.

Prior to the 1960s, when the valley surrounded by Cushetunk Mountain was dammed to form Round Valley Reservoir, the mountain was useful as a timber source. Farming use was limited due to the hard diabase rock in the mountain's soil.

== Geology ==
Like the nearby Palisades and Sourland Mountain, Cushetunk Mountain formed approximately 200 million years ago around the Triassic/Jurassic boundary as an intrusion of igneous rock, diabase, into local shale and sandstone. The intrusion occurred when the Newark Basin, an aborted rift zone that formed as Pangaea began to break up, was still volcanically active. Originally, it was thought that Cushetunk Mountain was formed well after the nearby Watchung Mountains, also of volcanic origin. The theory was that the deposition of sediment into the Newark Basin was still occurring after the Watchungs were extruded, which explained how Cushetunk Mountain was able to intrude into strata above the height of the Watchungs. However, it is now known that Cushetunk Mountain, as well as other intrusive bodies in the Newark Basin, are at least 10 million years older than the Watchungs, which implies that erosion and/or uplift must have occurred after Cushetunk Mountain was intruded in order to allow the Watchungs to form at the surface. Both Cushetunk Mountain and the Watchungs were elevated after millions of years of erosion stripped away the overlying sandstone and shale strata and exposed their durable trap rock masses to the surface.

Contrary to popular belief, the ring-like shape of the mountain does not represent a crater, particularly since the mountain was formed primarily within the Earth. Instead, the mountain's shape seems to be the result of an intruding sheet of magma becoming dramatically flexed as it penetrated local strata. Round Mountain, just to the south of Cushetunk Mountain, formed as the intruding sheet that created Cushetunk Mountain reached a syncline.

A unique feature of Cushetunk Mountain's geology is that the igneous intrusion forming the mountain partly overlaps Paleozoic limestone west of the Ramapo Fault. Occurring just south of Molasses Hill Rd in Clinton Township, the overlap is significant for two reasons. First, the overlap marks one of the only locations in the Newark Basin where an intrusion successfully crossed the Ramapo fault and effectively spilled over the western edge of the basin. Second, the trap rock comprising the intrusion at this location is fine grained and unlike the dense, coarse diabase common to Cushetunk Mountain. It is thought that this is because the intrusion erupted to the surface as it overran the Paleozoic limestone.

== Ecology ==
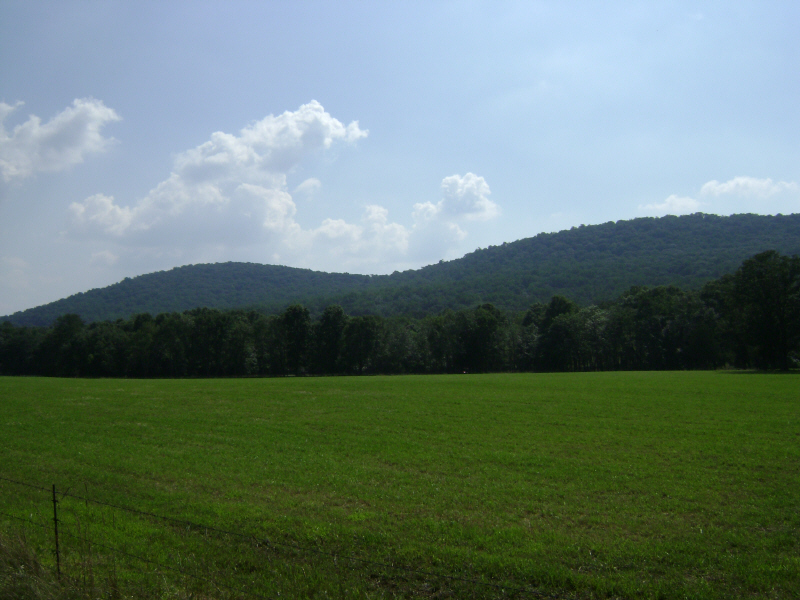
The northeast slope of Cushetunk Mountain

While most of the mountain ridges in New Jersey run generally north to south, Cushetunk Mountain primarily has an east-west ridge orientation because of the elongated north and south prongs of its horseshoe-like ridge. This produces significantly different microclimates between the north facing and south facing slopes of the mountain. On south facing slopes, the air temperature near the ground is consistently higher than on the north facing slopes, which do not receive as much sunlight. In terms of ecology this creates a noticeable impact on Cushetunk Mountain's vegetation.

Because the north slope of the mountain is cooler and shaded, moisture is more easily retained. This results in larger trees, as well as the growth of trees not seen on southern facing slopes. These trees include black birch, tulip tree, white ash, basswood, hickory, beech, and sugar maple. Shrubs are abundant in the understory of the northern slopes, as well as herbs typical of more northern forests, including wild ginger, wild sarsaparilla, black snakeroot, and columbine.

On the warmer, dryer southern slopes chestnut oak and red oak prevail, although the trees are also common to the northern slopes. In the understory, dogwood is dominant, and the diversity and number of shrubs is reduced. Grasses and sedges are the most prevalent ground cover.

Wildlife supported by Cushetunk Mountain includes a variety of woodland birds, including a nesting pair of bald eagles. Groundwater seeps, particularly on the northern slopes, provide habitat to amphibians, while outcrops of trap rock offer ideal environments for small reptiles.

== Recreation ==
- Round Valley Recreation Area
- Cushetunk Mountain Preserve
- Deer Path Park, located on and adjacent to Round Mountain and including the Peter Buell Trail.

== See also ==
- Round Valley Reservoir
