= Mechanicsville, New Jersey =

Mechanicsville, New Jersey may refer to:

- Mechanicsville, Hunterdon County, New Jersey
- Mechanicsville, Middlesex County, New Jersey
- Mechanicsville, Monmouth County, New Jersey
