= Murphy USA =

American gas station chain

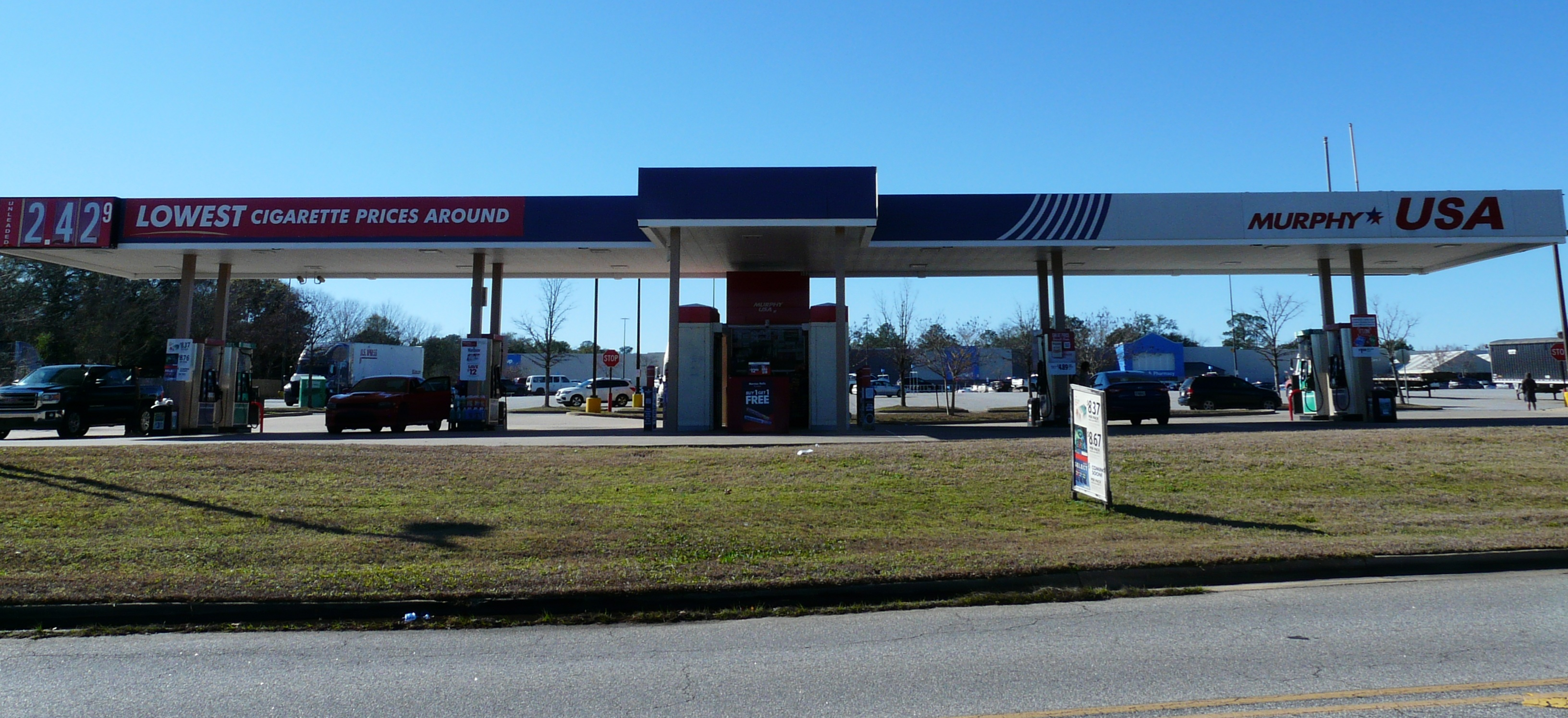
- location in Bainbridge, Georgia
- Type: Public
- Traded as: NYSE: MUSA; S&P 400 Component
- Founded: 1996; 30 years ago (became independent in 2013; 13 years ago as spin-off of Murphy Oil)
- Headquarters: El Dorado, Arkansas, U.S.
- Key people: Mindy West (President and CEO); Donald Smith (Interim CFO)
- Services: Service stations
- Number of employees: 15,000
- Website: murphyusa.com

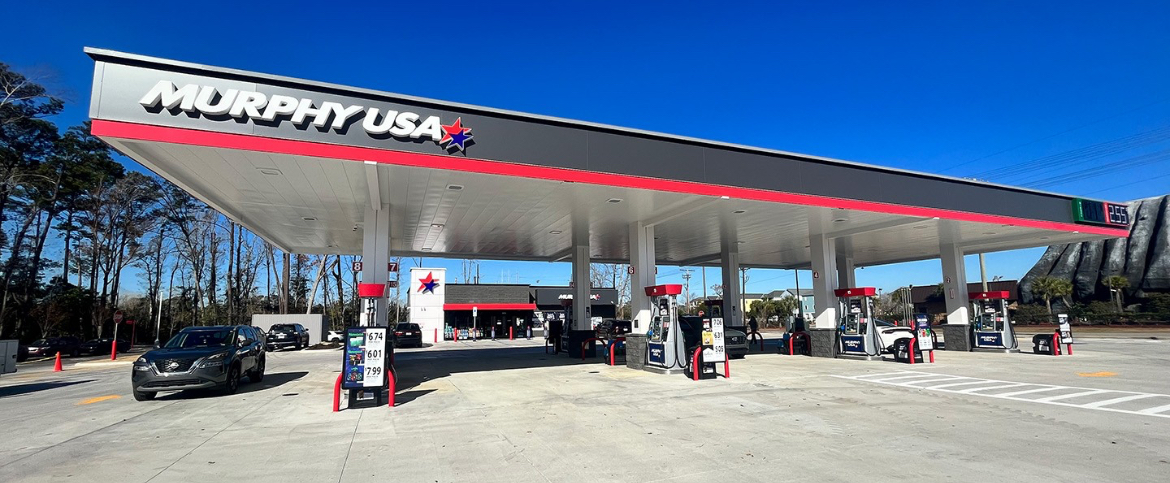
Murphy USA new store design, North Myrtle Beach, SC - 2024.

Murphy USA is an American corporation based in El Dorado, Arkansas that operates a chain of retail gas stations that are primarily located in proximity to Walmart stores. It was founded as a spin-off of Murphy Oil in 2013.

In the first quarter of 2016, Murphy USA announced a change in its relationship with Walmart, as they began opening their own in-house gas stations and convenience stores. It plans to increase its locations independently of Walmart sites. In 2016, Murphy USA announced that Core-Mark would be the sole distributor for their chain. It said, "...this partnership will allow Murphy to offer a larger selection of popular convenience store products."

On December 14, 2020, Murphy USA announced that it has reached an agreement to purchase QuickChek convenience stores, based in Whitehouse Station, New Jersey, for $645 million.

As of June 2024, it was ranked 214 on the Fortune 500 list of the largest United States corporations by revenue and ranked 89 on the Fortune's 100 Fastest-Growing Companies.

== Locations ==
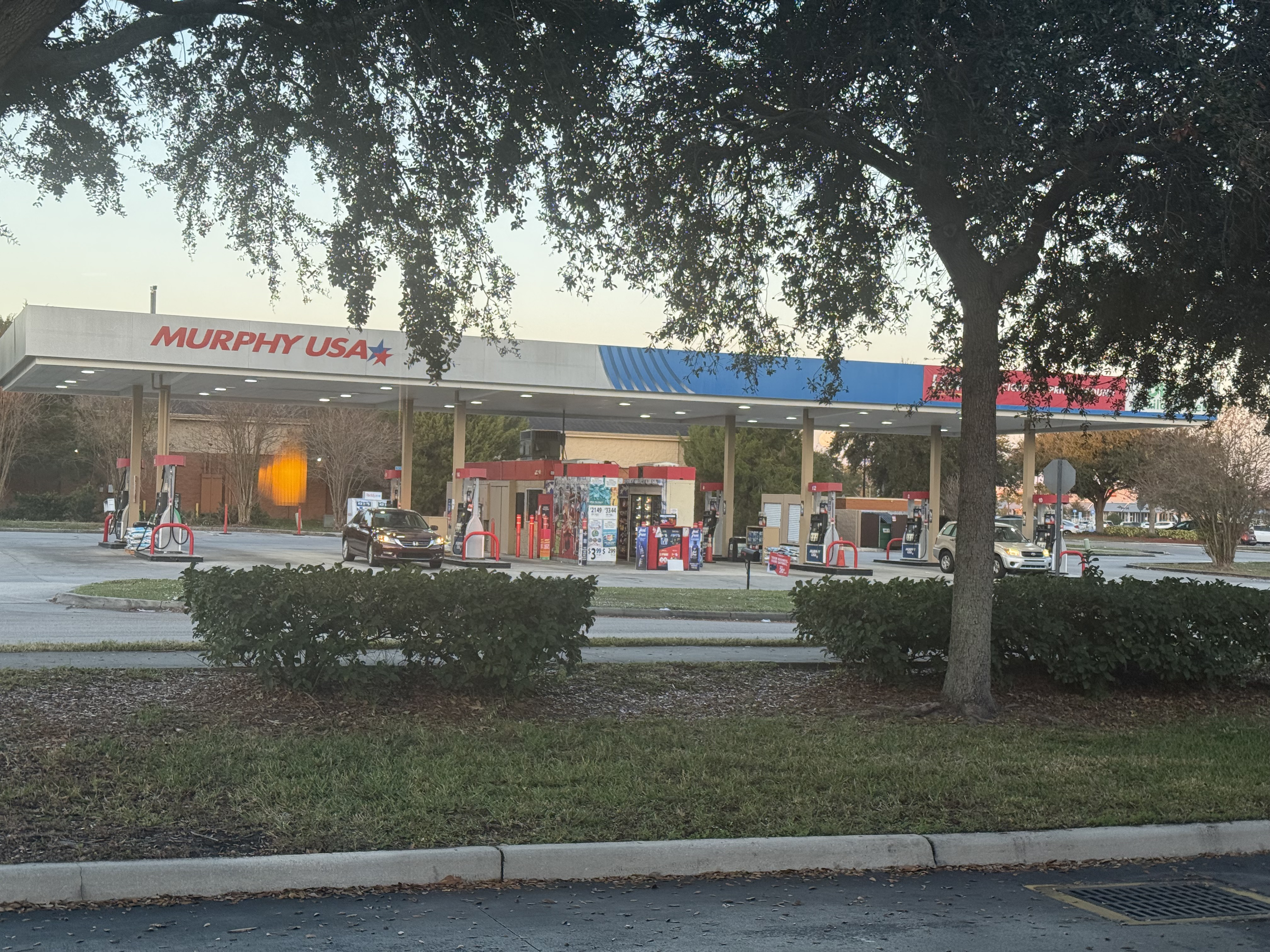
A Murphy USA gas station. There's a Walmart to its right (not in the photo)

Murphy USA opened its first stores exclusively adjacent to Walmart properties. As of February 21, 2024, Murphy USA operates 1,700 retail fueling stations in 27 US states and over 1,100 sites are located near Walmart stores. Murphy USA also has 240 Murphy Express branded stores, which are located independently. Murphy Express sites are typically large-format facilities (1,200-3,400+ square feet) that offer a larger array of products and more fueling lanes than the original format.

== Leadership ==
In October 2025, Mindy K. West was appointed chief executive officer of Murphy USA, becoming one of the few women leading a Fortune 500 energy company. She succeeded Andrew Clyde, who had served as president and CEO of Murphy USA since its spin-off from Murphy Oil in 2013. Her appointment took effect on January 1, 2026.
