= Whitehouse–Mechanicsville Historic District =

Historic district in New Jersey, United States

- U.S. National Register of Historic Places
- U.S. Historic district
- New Jersey Register of Historic Places
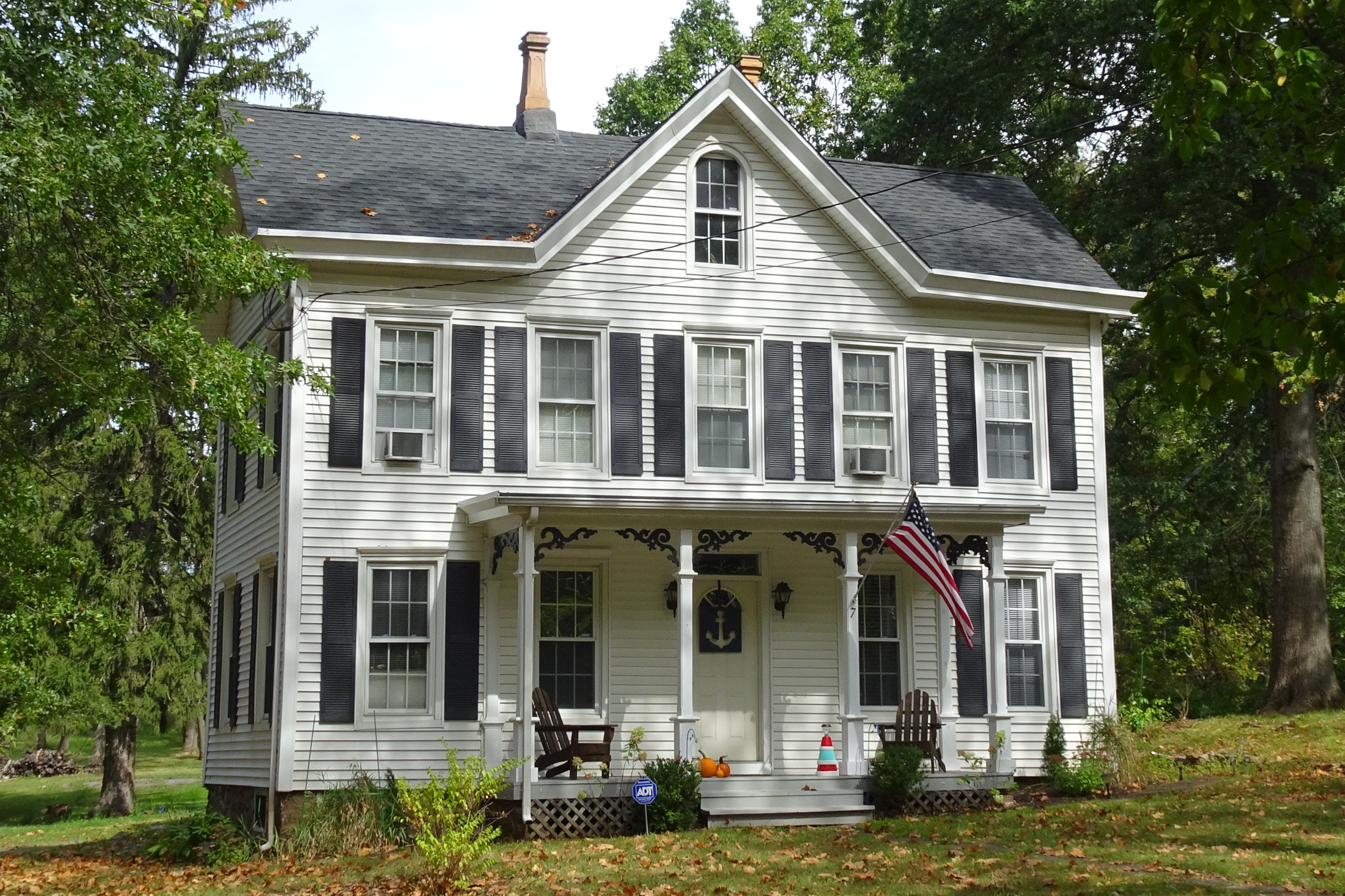
- 7 Old Highway 28

- Location within Hunterdon County, New Jersey Location within New Jersey Location within the United States
- Location: Old New Jersey Route 28, Mill, Lamington and School Roads; Readington Township, New Jersey
- Coordinates: 40°37′17″N 74°45′34″W
- Architectural style: Italianate, Greek Revival, Gothic Revival
- NRHP reference No.: 15000093
- NJRHP No.: 5385

Significant dates
- Added to NRHP: March 17, 2015
- Designated NJRHP: December 2, 2014

The Whitehouse–Mechanicsville Historic District is a historic district located along old New Jersey Route 28, Mill, Lamington and School Roads in Whitehouse and Mechanicsville, unincorporated communities in Readington Township, Hunterdon County, New Jersey. It was added to the National Register of Historic Places on March 17, 2015 for its significance in architecture and community development. The district includes 140 contributing buildings.

== History ==
The villages of Whitehouse and Mechanicsville developed along the 1806 stage coach route, then known as the New Jersey Turnpike, that went between Easton, Pennsylvania and New Brunswick, New Jersey.

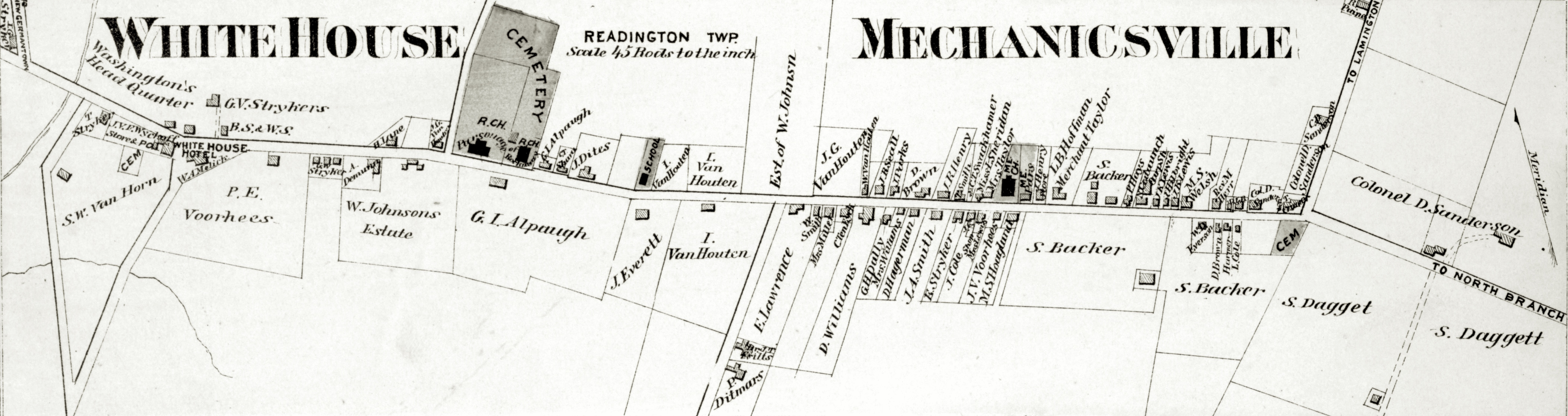
1873 map of area

== Description ==
The Whitehouse United Methodist Church, originally known as the Mechanicsville Methodist Episcopal Church, was built c. 1867 with Italianate style. The house at 20 Old Highway 28 was built c. 1860–1870 with Italianate and Greek Revival styles. The Ryland Inn was built with Gothic Revival style with Italianate influences.

== Gallery of contributing properties ==
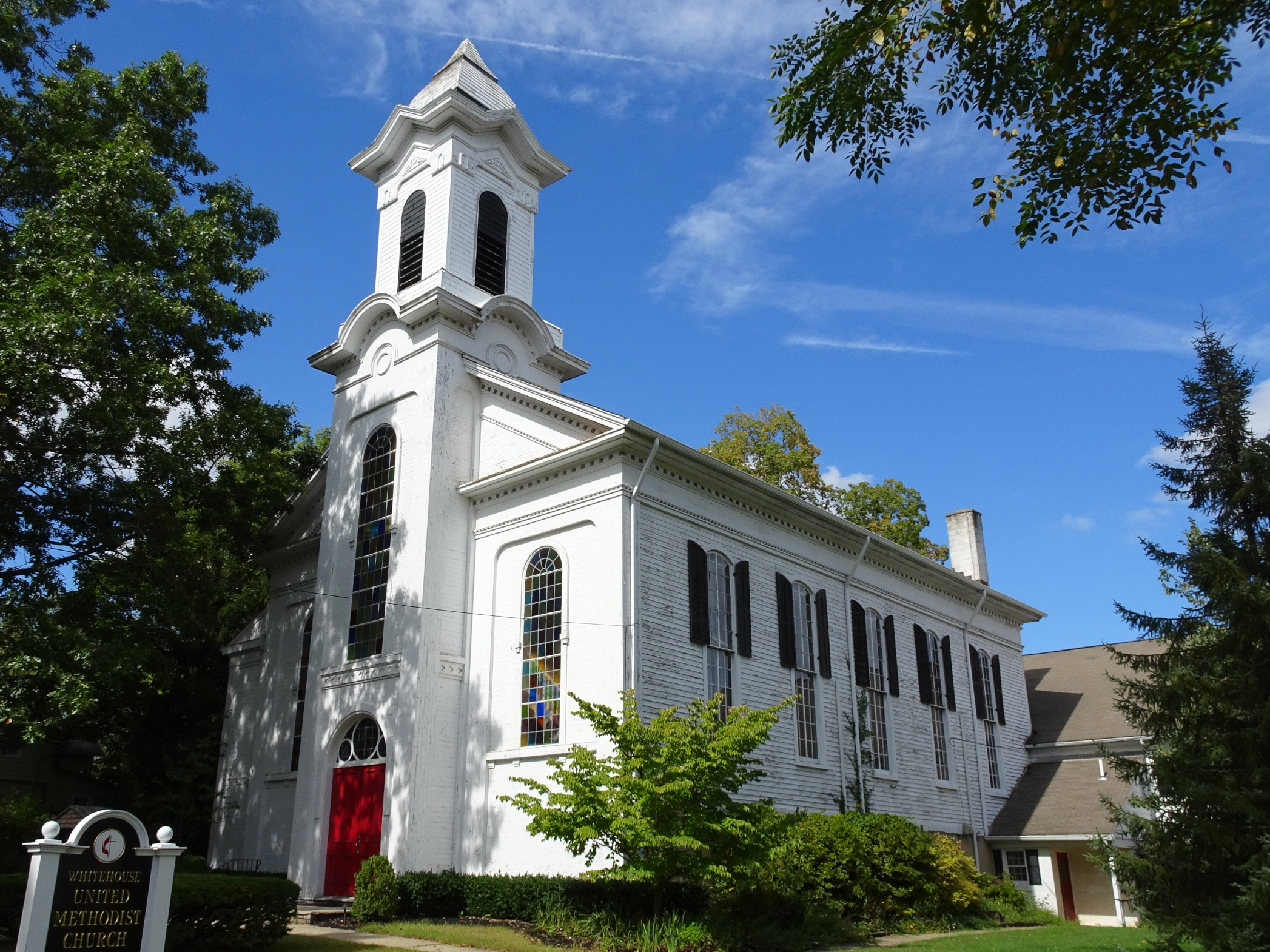
United Methodist Church

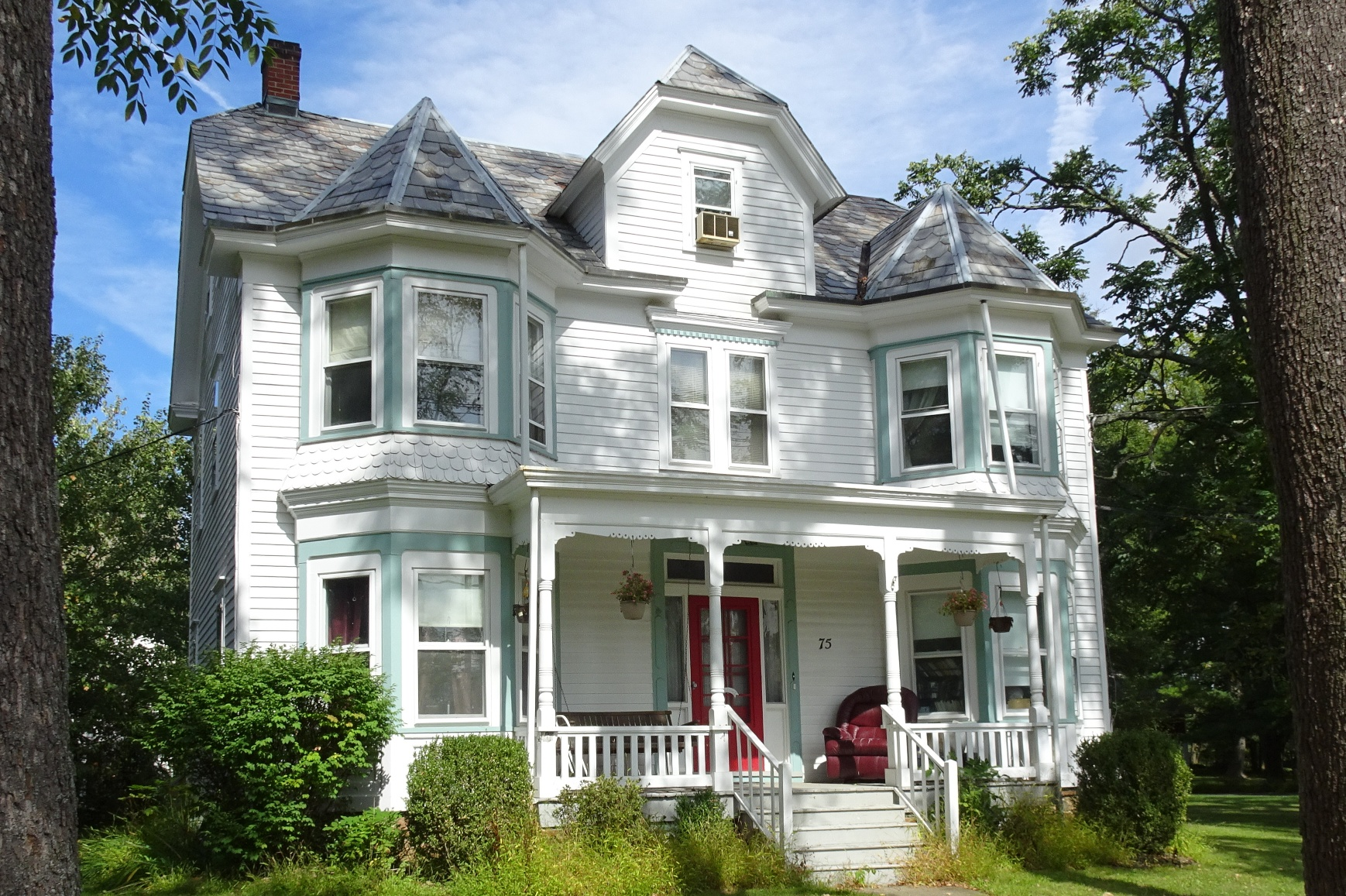
United Methodist Church Parsonage

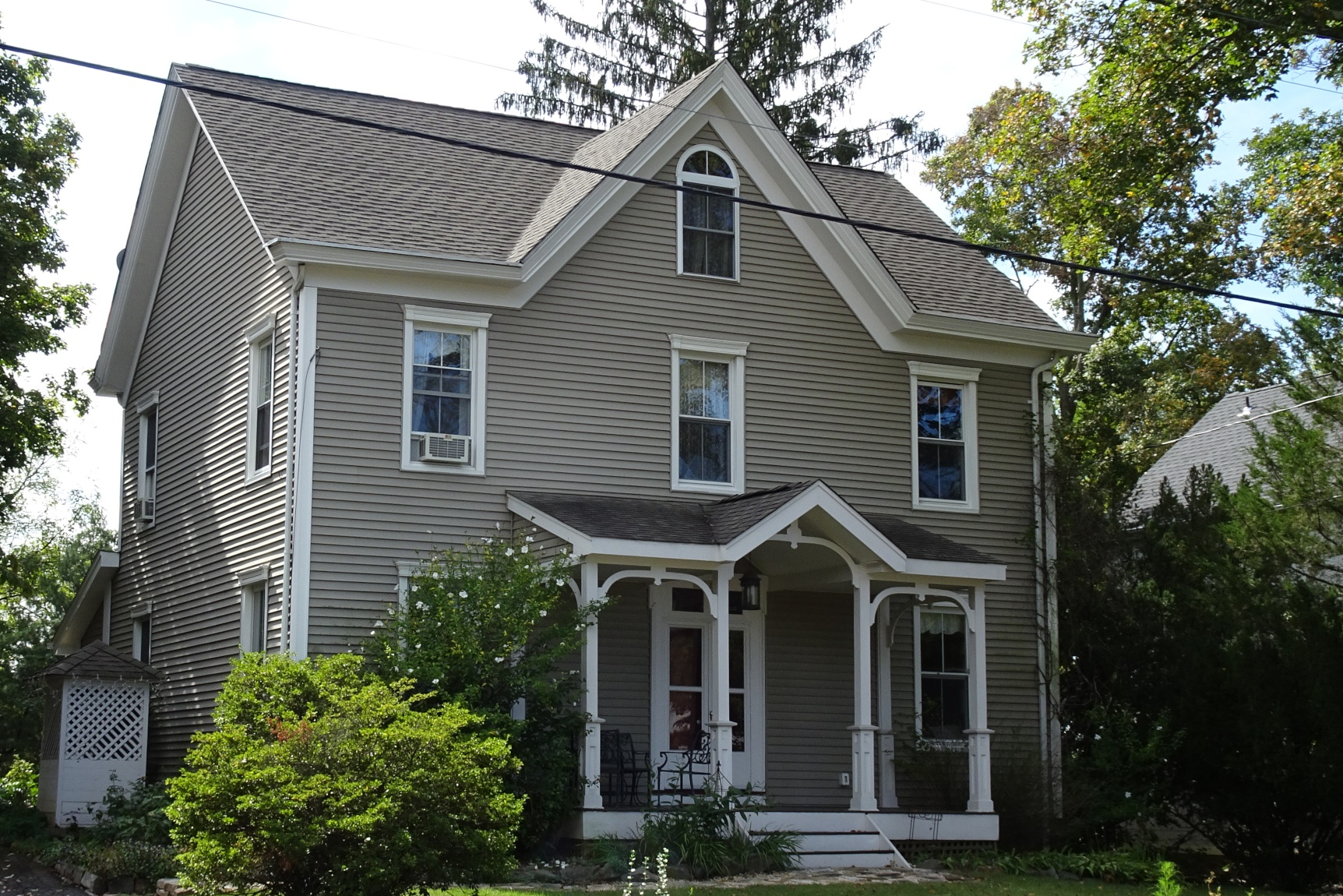
20 Old Highway 28

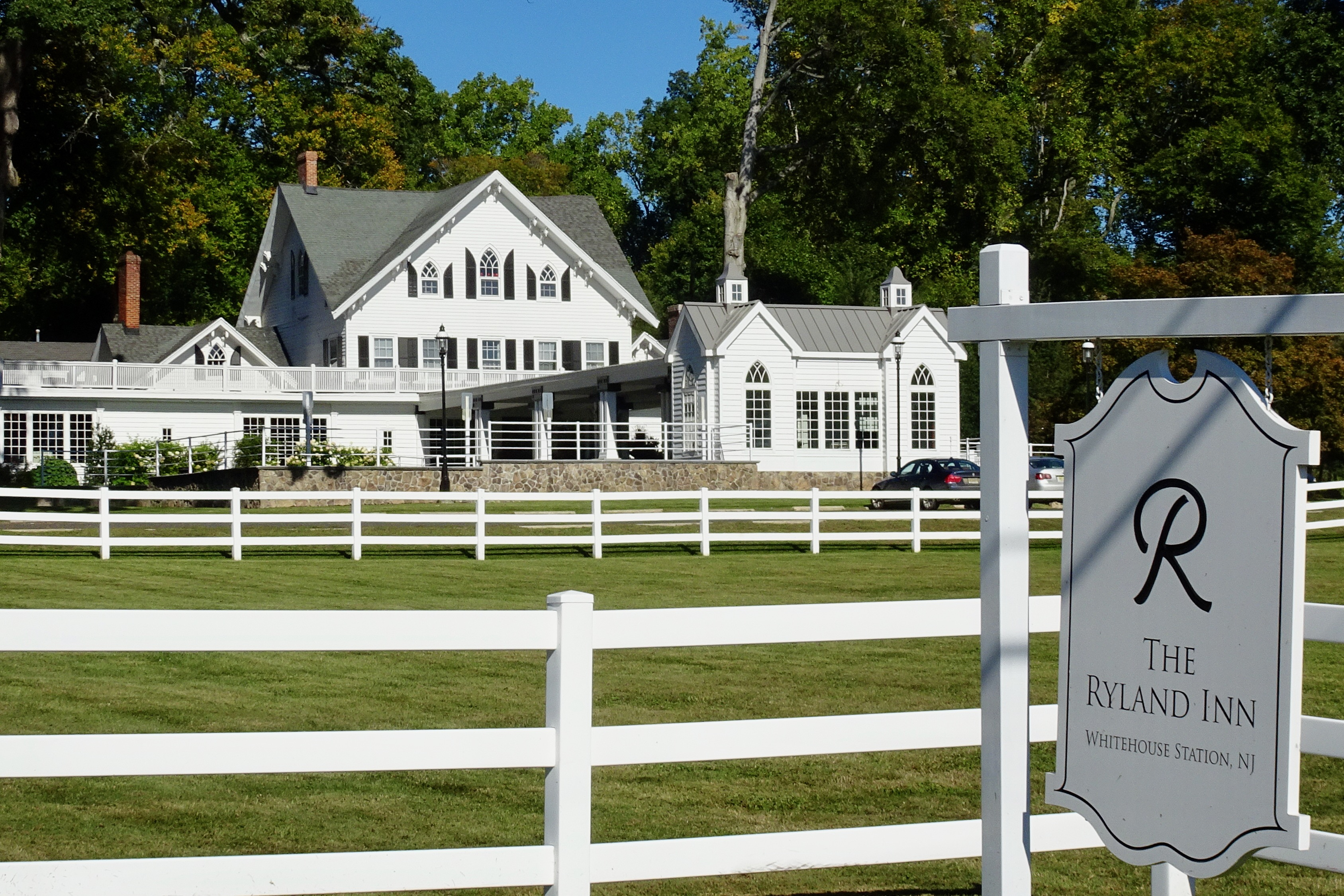
The Ryland Inn

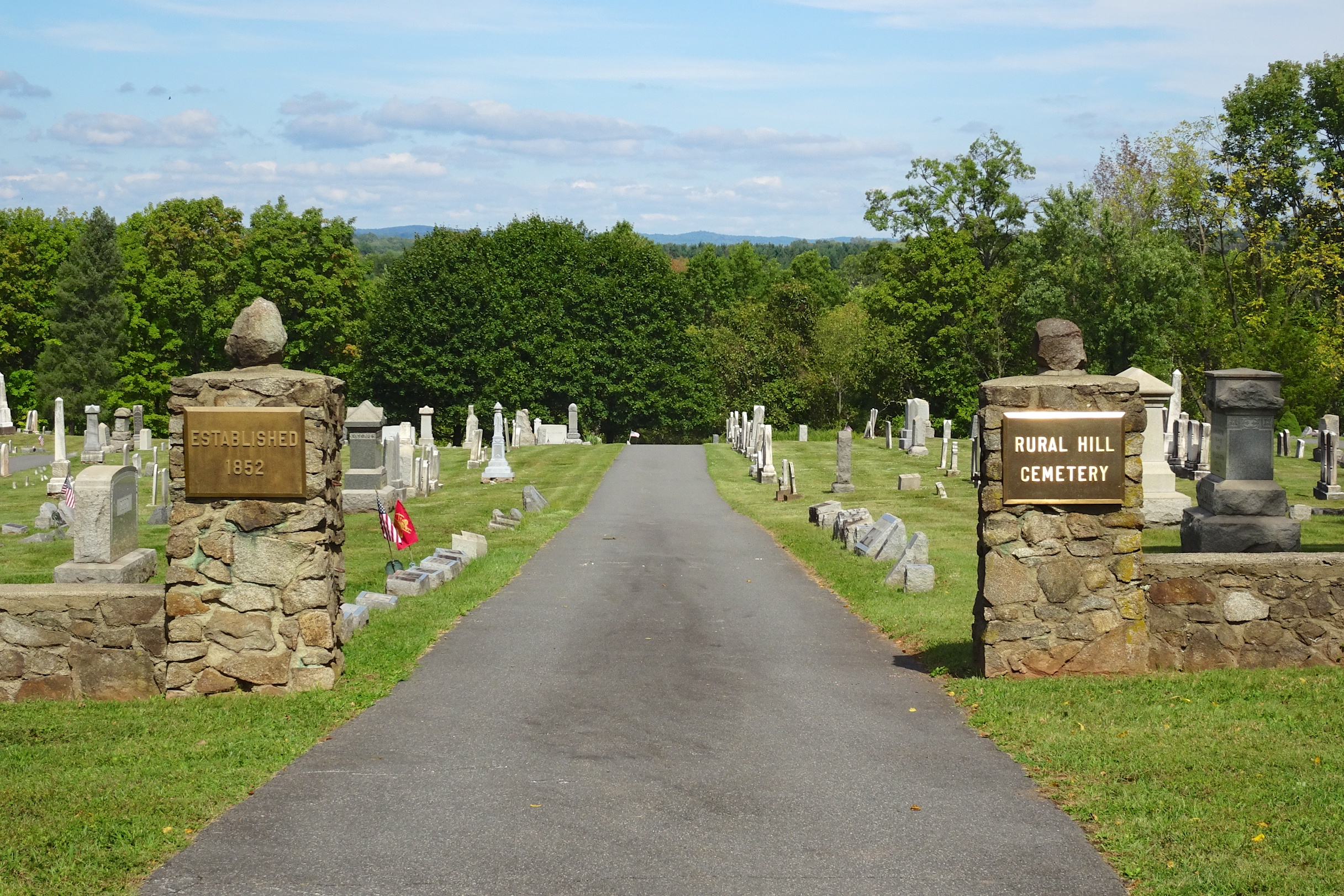
Rural Hill Cemetery

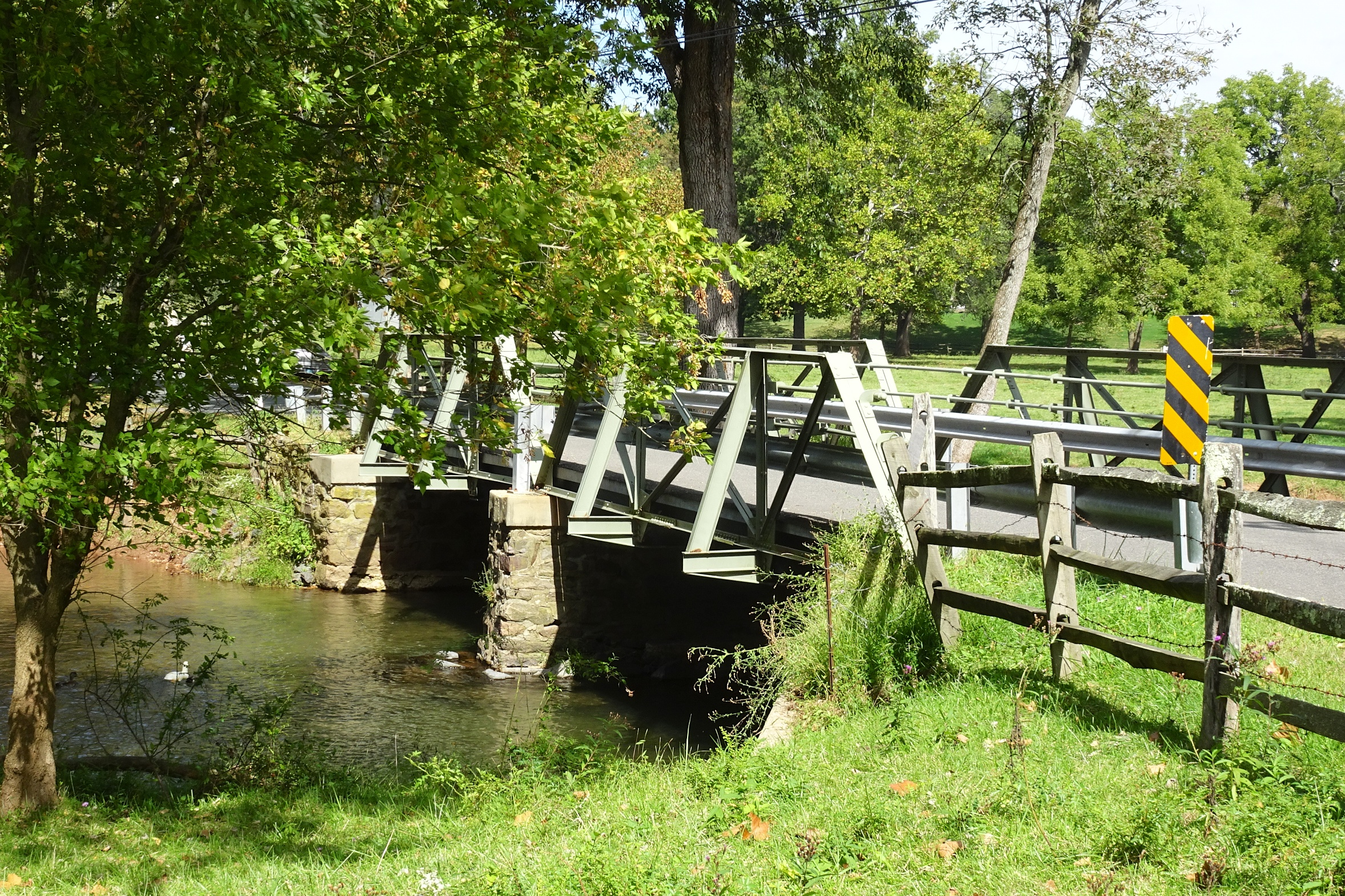
Truss bridge on Mill Road over the Rockaway Creek

== See also ==
- Taylor's Mill Historic District
