= QuickChek =

American convenience store chain

QuickChek Corporation

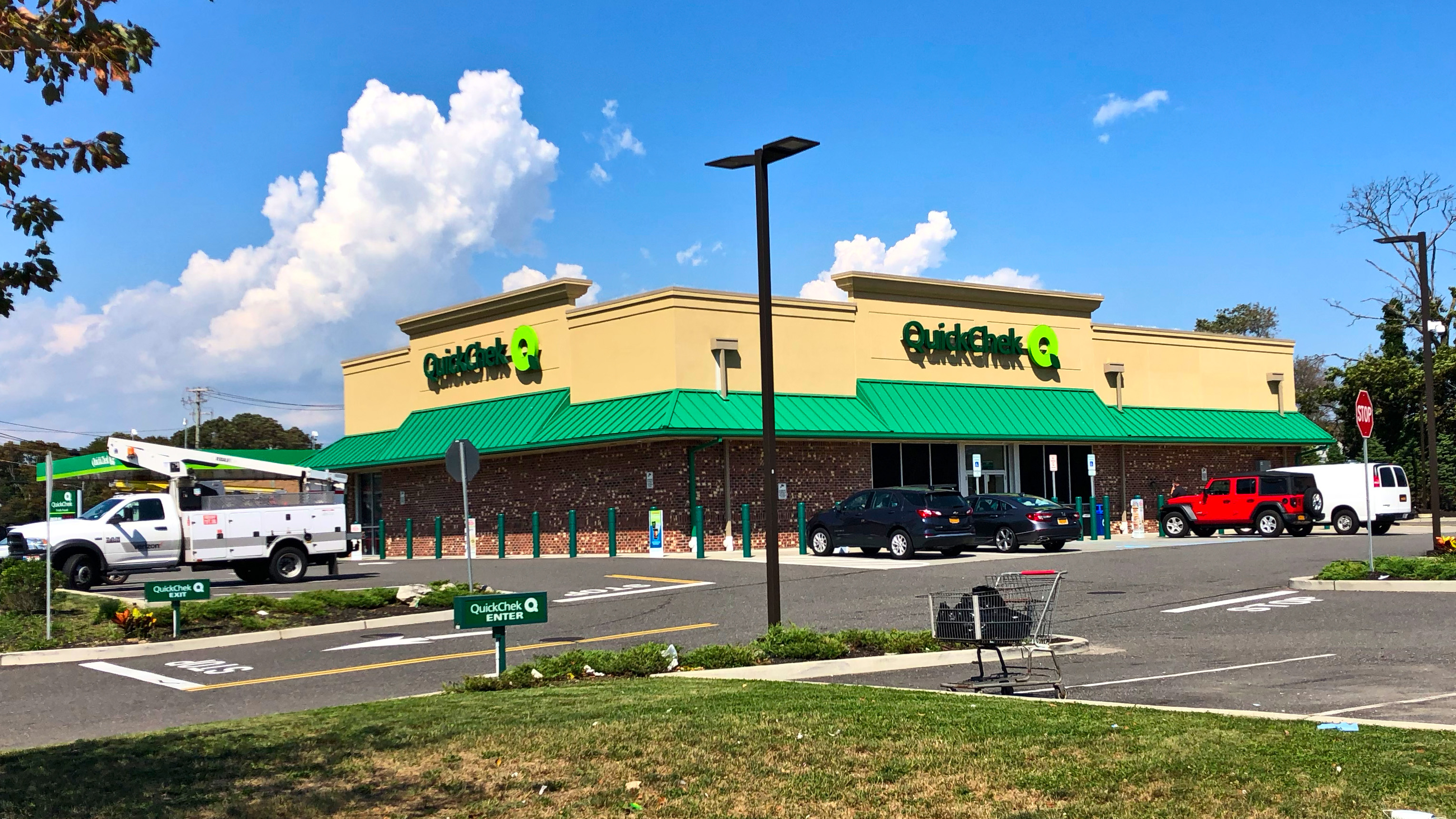
- A QuickChek convenience store & gas station in Copiague, New York
- Company type: Subsidiary
- Industry: Retail
- Founded: 1967; 59 years ago in Dunellen, New Jersey, U.S.
- Headquarters: 3 Old Highway 28, Whitehouse Station, New Jersey, U.S.
- Area served: New York metropolitan area
- Products: Food; Snacks; Non-food; Dairy; Gasoline; Liquor
- Parent: Murphy USA
- Website: quickchek.com

QuickChek is a chain of convenience stores based in Whitehouse Station, New Jersey with 153 stores in New Jersey and New York. The first store opened in Dunellen, New Jersey in 1967, and has since then grown into a chain. Several stores include pharmacies, gas stations, and liquor departments.

The size of the stores range from smaller corner-type shops to larger convenience stores. Many stores are located in urban areas, and most are open 24 hours a day. Former stores with pharmacies tended to offer a pharmacy-like selection of health products and aids. Stores have PNC Bank ATMs inside.

== History ==
QuickChek was founded in 1967 as the retail arm of Whitehouse, New Jersey based Durling Farms, a door-to-door milk and fresh dairy products delivery service established in 1888. The first QuickChek store opened at 419 North Avenue in Dunellen, with a second location opening by the end of that year in nearby New Market, Piscataway Township.

Initially, QuickChek stores were mini-supermarkets with mostly grocery items, snack foods, delis, candy, milk, bread, soda, medicated products, some prepackaged meats, and a small produce area. During the 1990s the stores began to offer fuel as well and gradually changed focus on snack foods, drinks, ready to eat foods, and gas stations. Still, QuickChek stores typically offer moderate amounts of basic groceries such as bread, milk, and a few grocery items, frozen dinners, as well as soft drinks, bottled water, ready to eat sandwiches, and a wide selection of snack foods. They also serve coffee, frozen beverages (Quick Freeze), and sandwiches. Some stores also serve milkshakes and frozen cappuccinos. Like most convenience stores, QuickChek sells cigarettes and other tobacco products, along with lottery tickets. Most sell fuel as well, which has become the main draw to these stores.

QuickChek also has its own assortment of baked goods, some of which are baked fresh in-store.

== QuickChek New Jersey Festival of Ballooning ==
QuickChek hosts an annual hot-air balloon festival in Readington, New Jersey, which runs the last weekend in July. An outdoor QuickChek is set up with a deli and coffee counter, and during the weekend, visitors are able to attend the various activities that go on through the festival. In 2011, QuickChek's Balloon festival featured many artists such as Meat Loaf, Barenaked Ladies, and ABBA.

== References in pop culture ==
The New Jersey–based band, The Bouncing Souls, has a song written about a girl who worked in a QuickChek called "Quick Chek Girl".

Another New Jersey–based band named The Number Twelve Looks Like You mentions QuickChek coffee in their song "The Garden's All Nighters" from the album Worse Than Alone with the line of lyrics; "Quick Chek coffee is cooling down."

== Branchburg QuickChek incident ==
On January 26, 2010, a clerk at a QuickChek in Branchburg, New Jersey, called the police about a suspicious man in the store. The clerk said she knew the man "had something on him", but was uncertain what it was. Officers arrested Lloyd Woodson, and found in his possession and in his motel room a large weapons cache that included illegal weapons and ammunition, a detailed map of Fort Drum, and a red-and-white checked headdress that police said resembled a keffiyeh worn by men from parts of the Middle East. He was charged on multiple state and federal weapons charges. Branchburg Police Chief Brian Fitzgerald later praised QuickChek clerk Linda Yannazzno and employee Michael Murray for their alertness.

== Acquisition by Murphy USA ==
Murphy USA, based in El Dorado, Arkansas, announced their purchase of QuickChek on December 14, 2020. The transaction was closed in January 2021. Blake Segal, former SVP of Operations at Caesars Entertainment, was named Head of QuickChek in September 2021.
