= Taylor's Mill Historic District =

Historic district in New Jersey, United States

- U.S. National Register of Historic Places
- U.S. Historic district
- New Jersey Register of Historic Places
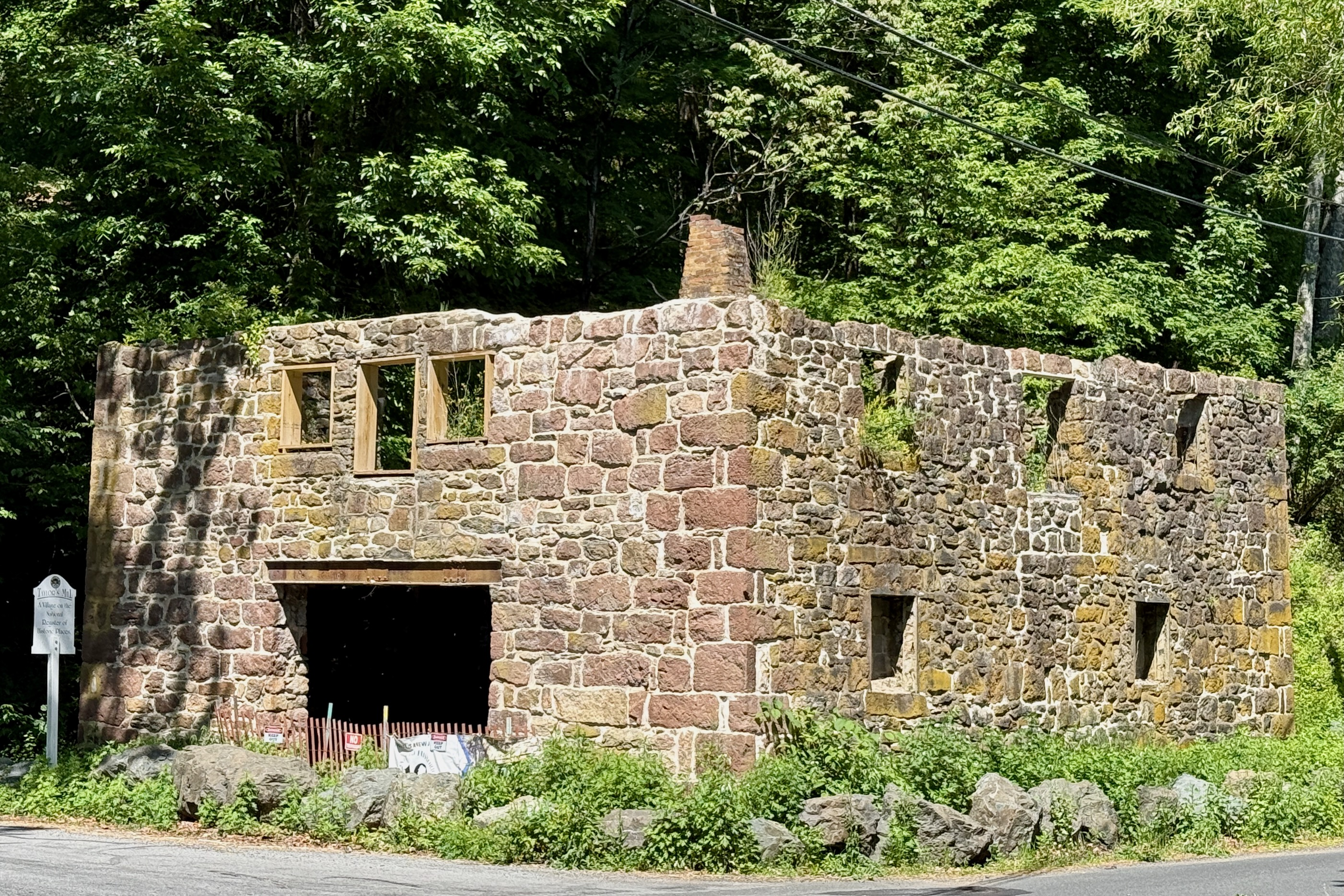
- Taylor's Mill in 2026

- Location within Hunterdon County, New Jersey Location within New Jersey Location within the United States
- Location: Taylor's Mill Road and Rockaway Road, Readington Township, New Jersey
- Nearest city: Oldwick, New Jersey
- Coordinates: 40°39′43″N 74°45′58″W
- Area: 26 acres (11 ha)
- Built: c. 1760
- Architectural style: 18th-century masonry mill
- NRHP reference No.: 92000636 (original); 97000105 (increase)
- NJRHP No.: 1627, 3250

Significant dates
- Added to NRHP: June 11, 1992
- Boundary increase: March 7, 1997
- Designated NJRHP: April 10, 1992; January 15, 1997

Taylor's Mill Historic District, a 26-acre (11 ha) historic district featuring the gristmill Taylor's Mill, is located along Taylor's Mill Road and Rockaway Road near Oldwick in Readington Township, Hunterdon County, New Jersey. It was added to the National Register of Historic Places on June 11, 1992 for its significance in architecture, exploration/settlement, industry, and military. The district boundary was increased by 8 acres (3.2 ha) in 1997 to cross the Rockaway Creek and extend into Tewksbury Township.

== History ==
Colonel John Taylor (1744–1811) built this grist and flouring mill c. 1760 on the Rockaway Creek. It supplied grain for the Continental Army during the American Revolutionary War. The mill had many subsequent owners, including Eleanor and Manning McCrea.

On April 5, 2024, the mill suffered damage from the 2024 New Jersey earthquake, a rare 4.8 magnitude earthquake that shook much of the Northeast United States.

As of 2026, the mill and surrounding area are slated to be restored and turned into a pedestrian rest stop.

== Gallery ==
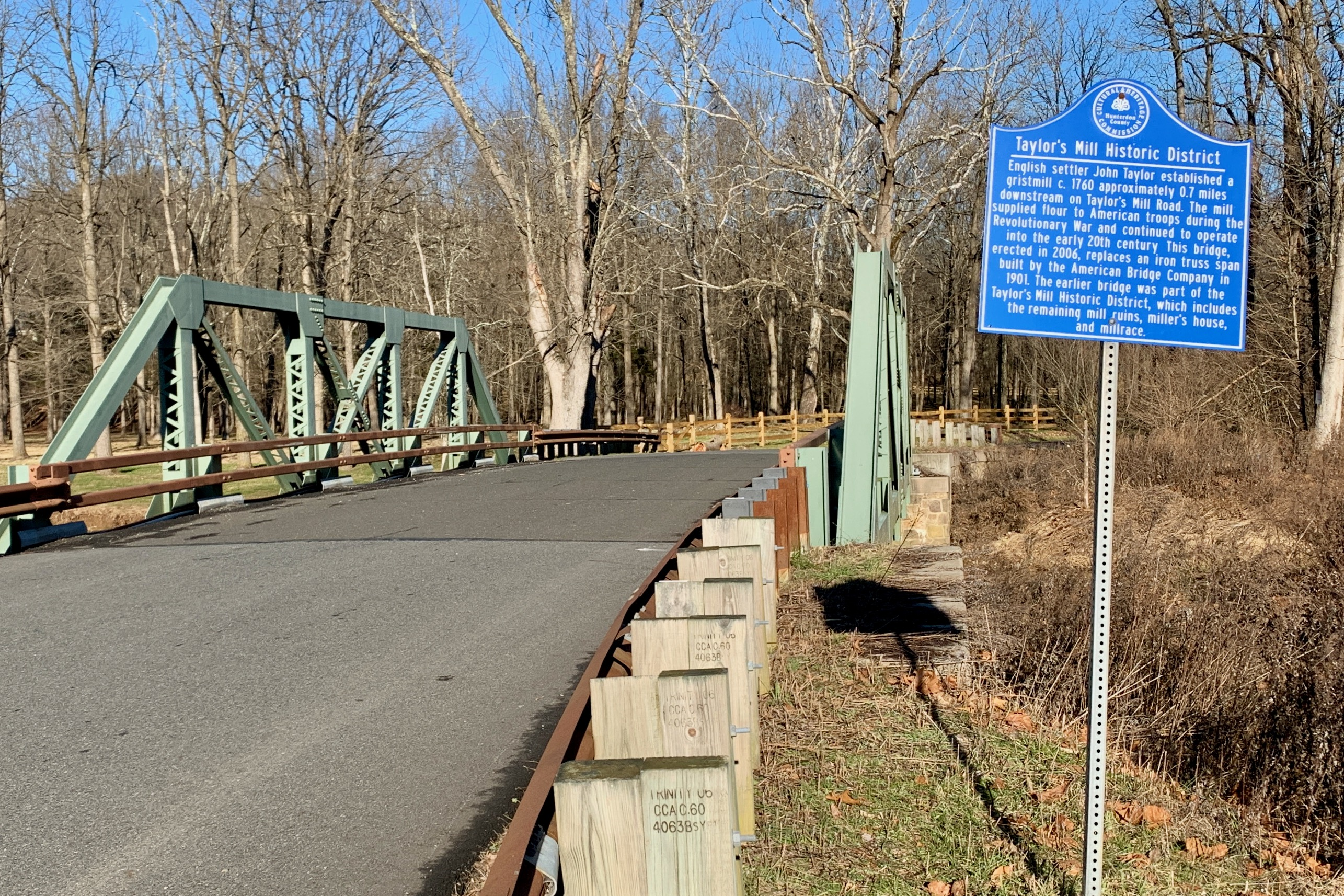
Information sign by new bridge over the Rockaway Creek

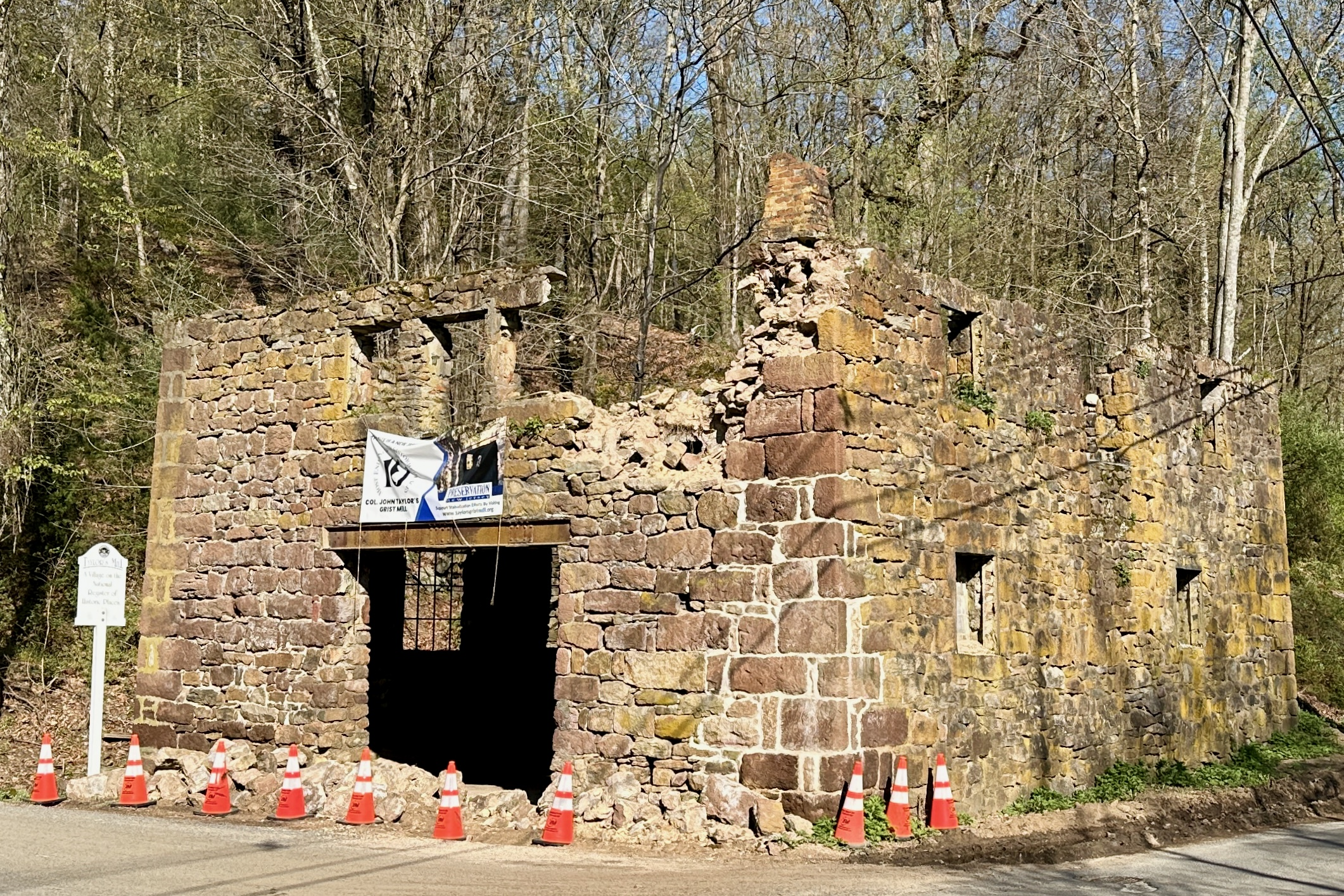
Taylor's Mill after the 2024 earthquake (April 2024)

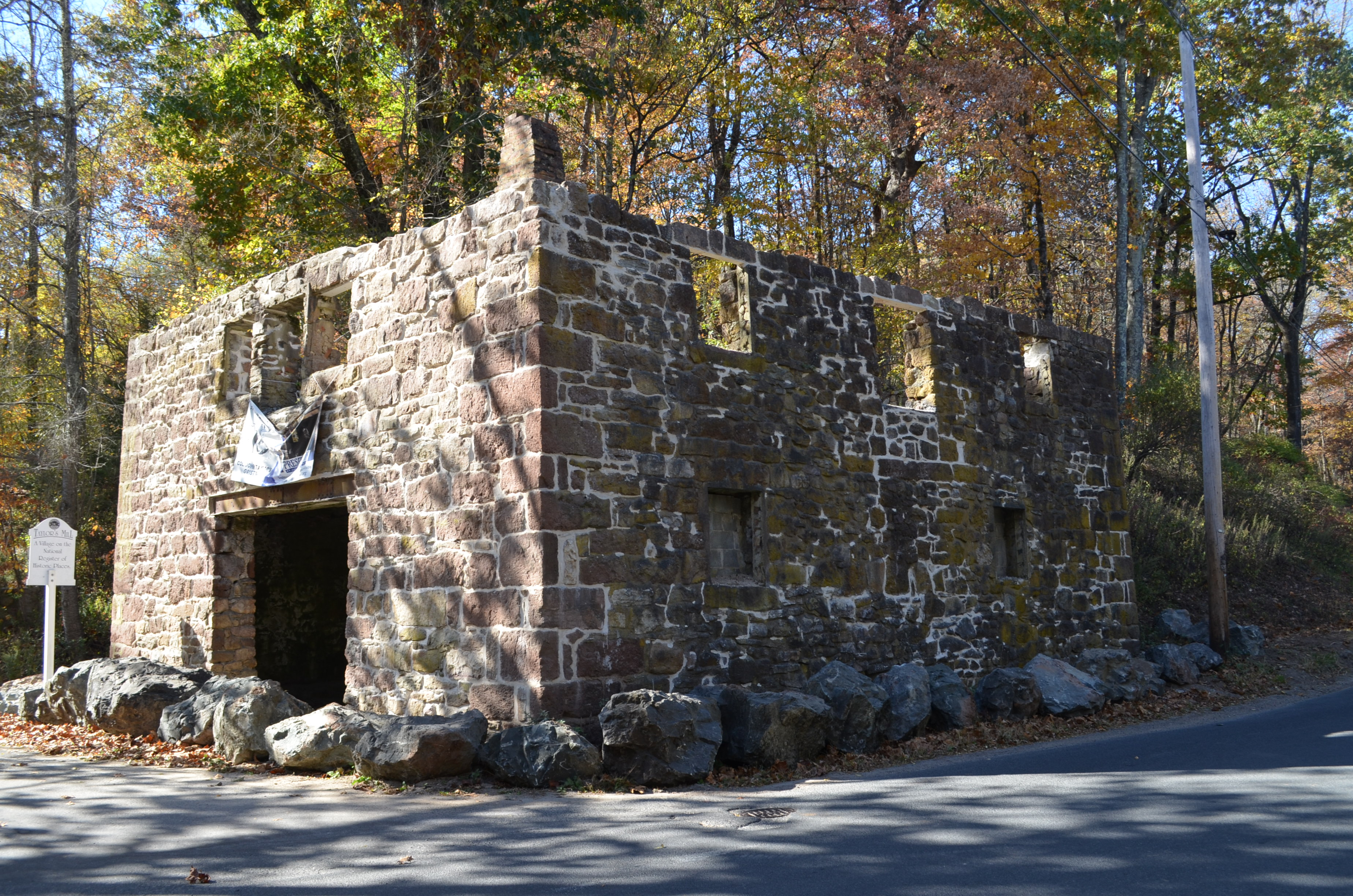
Taylor's Mill after stabilization (October 2024)

== See also ==
- McCrea Mills, New Jersey
