= Mechanicsville, Hunterdon County, New Jersey =

Populated place in Hunterdon County, New Jersey, US

Mechanicsville, New Jersey
- Unincorporated community
- Location within Hunterdon County, New Jersey Location within New Jersey Location within the United States
- Coordinates: 40°36′57″N 74°43′50″W
- Country: United States
- State: New Jersey
- County: Hunterdon
- Township: Readington

Mechanicsville is an unincorporated community located within Readington Township in Hunterdon County, in the U.S. state of New Jersey. It is located along present day US Route 22, just east of Whitehouse near the intersection of Lamington Road. The hamlet once had a tavern, a store, numerous mechanic shops as well as a number of residences. As Whitehouse and Mechanicsville lost many of the businesses along the main road, the two hamlets eventually merged. The Whitehouse General Store, the East Whitehouse Fire Department and the Whitehouse United Methodist Church are in the section of Whitehouse that used to be Mechanicsville. The Ryland Inn was located in this section of Whitehouse.

The Whitehouse–Mechanicsville Historic District, which includes historic places in both Whitehouse and Mechanicsville, was added to the National Register of Historic Places on March 17, 2015.
