= Whitehouse Station, New Jersey =

Populated place in Hunterdon County, New Jersey, US

- Census-designated place
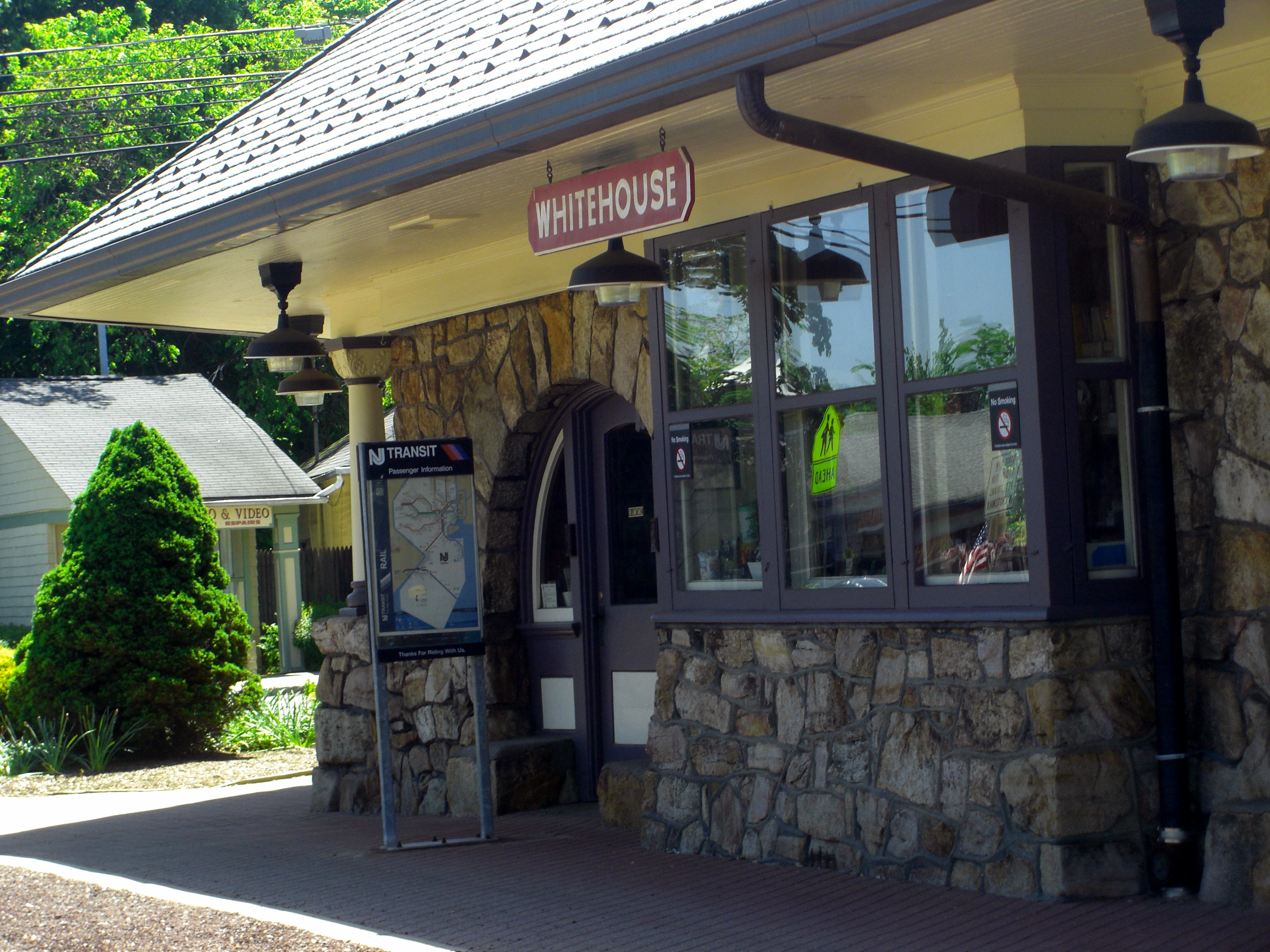
- Whitehouse Train Station & Readington Library

- Map of Whitehouse Station highlighted within Hunterdon County. Right: Location of Hunterdon County in New Jersey.

- Location in Hunterdon County Location in New Jersey Location in the United States
- Coordinates: 40°36′55″N 74°46′14″W
- Country: United States
- State: New Jersey
- County: Hunterdon
- Township: Readington

Area
  - Total: 2.57 sq mi (6.65 km^{2})
  - Land: 2.52 sq mi (6.52 km^{2})
  - Water: 0.050 sq mi (0.13 km^{2}) 3.20%
- Elevation: 174 ft (53 m)

Population (2020)
  - Total: 3,152
  - Density: 1,251.3/sq mi (483.14/km^{2})
- Time zone: UTC−05:00 (Eastern (EST))
  - Summer (DST): UTC−04:00 (Eastern (EDT))
- ZIP Code: 08889
- Area code: 908
- FIPS code: 34-80720
- GNIS feature ID: 881799, 2390505

Whitehouse Station, also spelled White House Station, is an unincorporated community and census-designated place (CDP) located within Readington Township, in Hunterdon County, New Jersey. At the 2010 United States census, the CDP's population was 2,089. Whitehouse Station takes its name from Whitehouse and Abraham Van Horne's 18th century tavern.

The CDP is home to the corporate headquarters of QuickChek, a chain of gas stations and convivence stores in New Jersey and New York.

NJ Transit offers service on the Raritan Valley Line at White House Station.

== History ==
The area, which is now served only by New Jersey Transit's Raritan Valley Line, used to be a railroad junction, serving as the endpoint of the ill-fated Rockaway Valley Railroad, which ceased operation in 1913.

Whitehouse Station was home to the global headquarters of pharmaceutical giant Merck, which was housed in the modernist Merck Headquarters Building for more than two decades. Merck has shifted its base of operations to Rahway.

On April 5, 2024, at 10:23 AM, the community was struck by a magnitude 4.8 earthquake. The quake saw no major damage and no injuries. At 5:59 PM, on the same day, a second earthquake recorded at magnitude 3.8 struck east of the community in Gladstone, New Jersey.

== Geography ==
According to the United States Census Bureau, the CDP had a total area of 1.346 square miles (3.49 km^{2}), including 1.303 square miles (3.37 km^{2}) of land and 0.043 square miles (0.11 km^{2}) of water (3.20%).

== Demographics ==
Historical population
Census	Pop.	Note	%±
1970	1,019		—
1990	1,287		—
2000	1,951		51.6%
2010	2,089		7.1%
2020	3,152		50.9%
Population sources: 1950 1960 1970; 1980 1990 2000; 2010 2000

Whitehouse Station first appeared as an unincorporated community under the name White House Station in the 1970 U.S. census. The community did not appear in the 1980 U.S. census and then was listed as a census designated place in the 1990 U.S. census.

=== 2020 census ===
White House Station CDP, New Jersey – Racial and ethnic composition Note: the US Census treats Hispanic/Latino as an ethnic category. This table excludes Latinos from the racial categories and assigns them to a separate category. Hispanics/Latinos may be of any race.
Race / Ethnicity (NH = Non-Hispanic)	Pop 2000	Pop 2010	Pop 2020	% 2000	% 2010	% 2020
White alone (NH)	1,841	1,833	2,479	94.36%	87.75%	78.65%
Black or African American alone (NH)	17	58	64	0.87%	2.78%	2.03%
Native American or Alaska Native alone (NH)	0	1	3	0.00%	0.05%	0.10%
Asian alone (NH)	19	64	264	0.97%	3.06%	8.38%
Native Hawaiian or Pacific Islander alone (NH)	0	0	0	0.00%	0.00%	0.00%
Other race alone (NH)	0	0	8	0.00%	0.00%	0.25%
Mixed race or Multiracial (NH)	24	23	73	1.23%	1.10%	2.32%
Hispanic or Latino (any race)	50	110	261	2.56%	5.27%	8.28%
Total	1,951	2,089	3,152	100.00%	100.00%	100.00%

=== 2010 census ===
The 2010 United States census counted 2,089 people, 963 households, and 553 families in the CDP. The population density was 1,602.7 people per square mile (618.8 people/km^{2}). There were 989 housing units at an average density of 758.8 units per square mile (293.0 units/km^{2}). The racial makeup was 91.53% (1,912) White, 2.82% (59) Black or African American, 0.05% (1) Native American, 3.06% (64) Asian, 0.00% (0) Pacific Islander, 1.15% (24) from other races, and 1.39% (29) from two or more races. Hispanic or Latino of any race were 5.27% (110) of the population.

Of the 963 households, 23.2% had children under the age of 18; 46.0% were married couples living together; 8.9% had a female householder with no husband present and 42.6% were non-families. Of all households, 37.1% were made up of individuals and 17.1% had someone living alone who was 65 years of age or older. The average household size was 2.17 and the average family size was 2.87.

19.6% of the population were under the age of 18, 4.3% from 18 to 24, 23.1% from 25 to 44, 31.5% from 45 to 64, and 21.4% who were 65 years of age or older. The median age was 46.6 years. For every 100 females, the population had 82.6 males. For every 100 females ages 18 and older there were 77.3 males.

=== 2000 census ===
At the 2000 United States census there were 1,951 people, 878 households and 531 families living in the CDP. The population density was 583.9 people/km^{2} (1,512 people/mi^{2}). There were 905 housing units at an average density of 270.9 units/km^{2} (702 units/mi^{2}). The racial makeup of the CDP was 96.05% White, 0.87% African American, 0.97% Asian, 0.56% from other races, and 1.54% from two or more races. Hispanic or Latino of any race were 2.56% of the population.

There were 878 households, of which 24.9% had children under the age of 18 living with them, 47.4% were married couples living together, 10.4% had a female householder with no husband present, and 39.5% were non-families. 34.1% of all households were made up of individuals, and 11.3% had someone living alone who was 65 years of age or older. The average household size was 2.22 and the average family size was 2.86.

Age distribution was 19.9% under the age of 18, 5.1% from 18 to 24, 33.5% from 25 to 44, 26.4% from 45 to 64, and 15.1% who were 65 years of age or older. The median age was 40 years. For every 100 females there were 87.4 males. For every 100 females age 18 and over, there were 79.7 males.

The median household income was $75,111, and the median family income was $92,793. Males had a median income of $60,673 versus $43,438 for females. The per capita income for the CDP was $38,627. None of the families and 1.4% of the population were living below the poverty line, including no under eighteens and 2.9% of those over 64.

== Points of interest ==
There are several nearby points of interest.

- The Rockaway Reformed Church is the third building of the congregation founded in Whitehouse.
- Memorial Park Cemetery in Whitehouse is near the site of Abraham Van Horne's "White House" tavern. It is maintained by the local chapter of the Daughters of the American Revolution.
- The Whitehouse–Mechanicsville Historic District was added to the National Register of Historic Places in 2015 for its significance in architecture and community development.
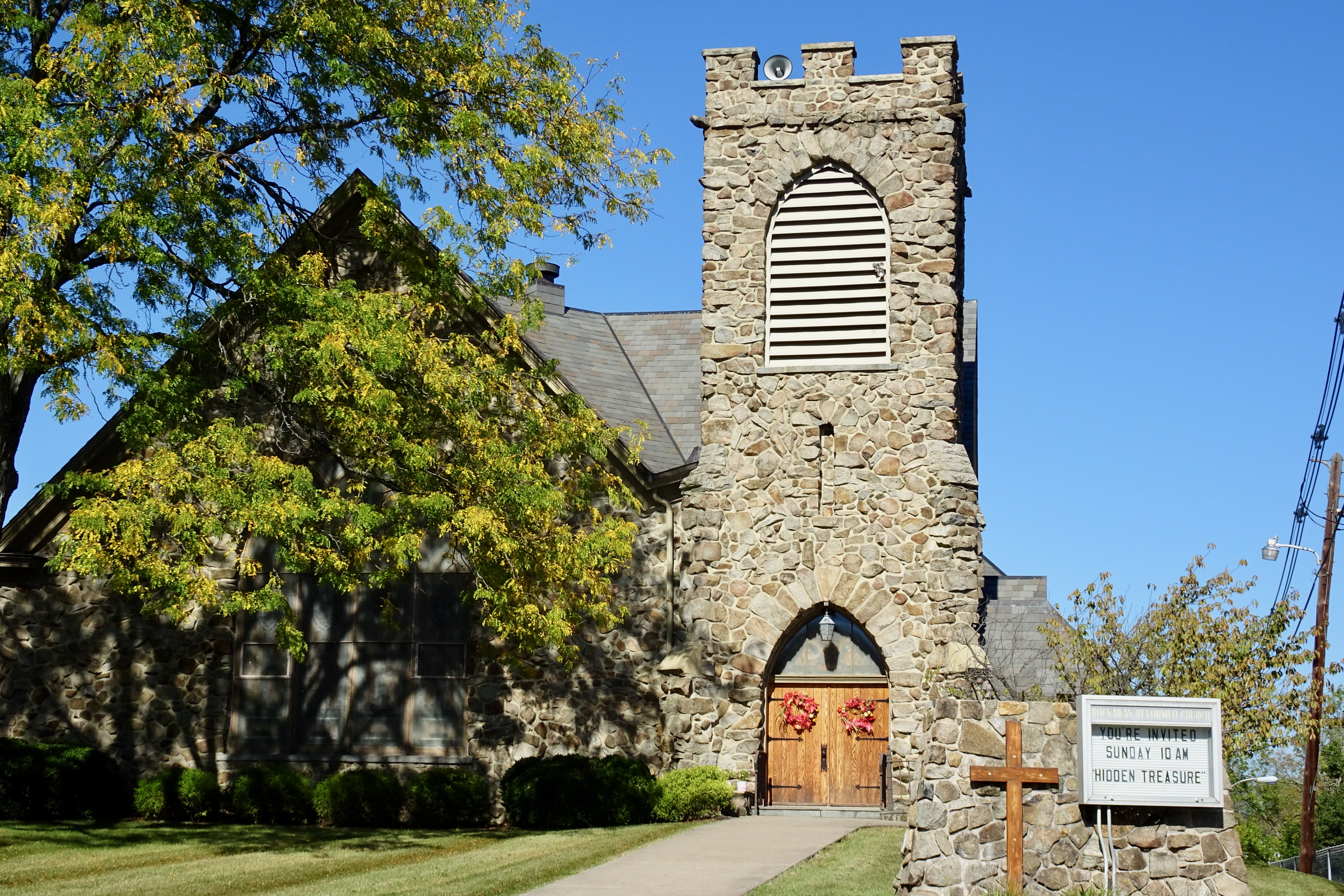
The Rockaway Reformed Church

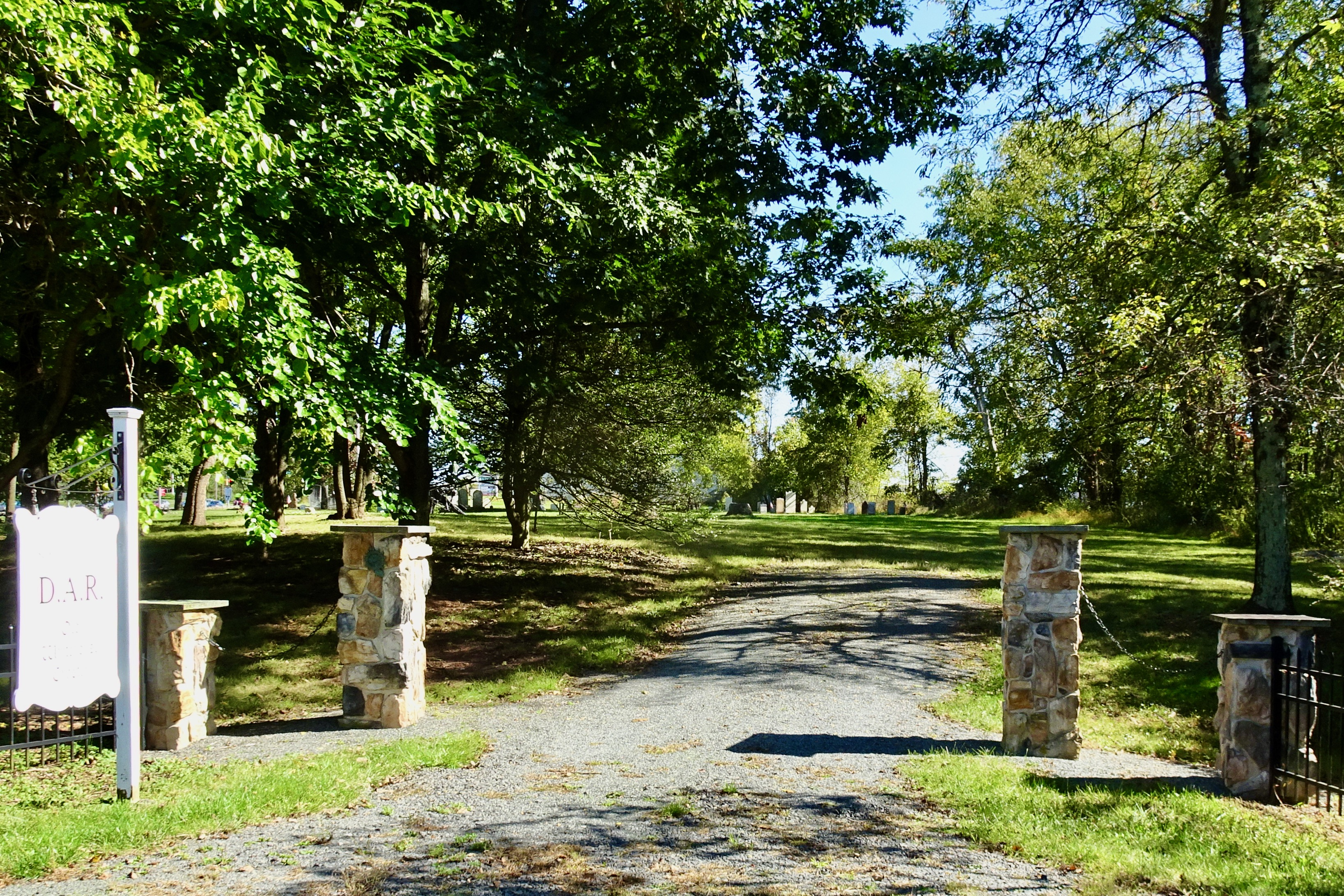
Memorial Park Cemetery

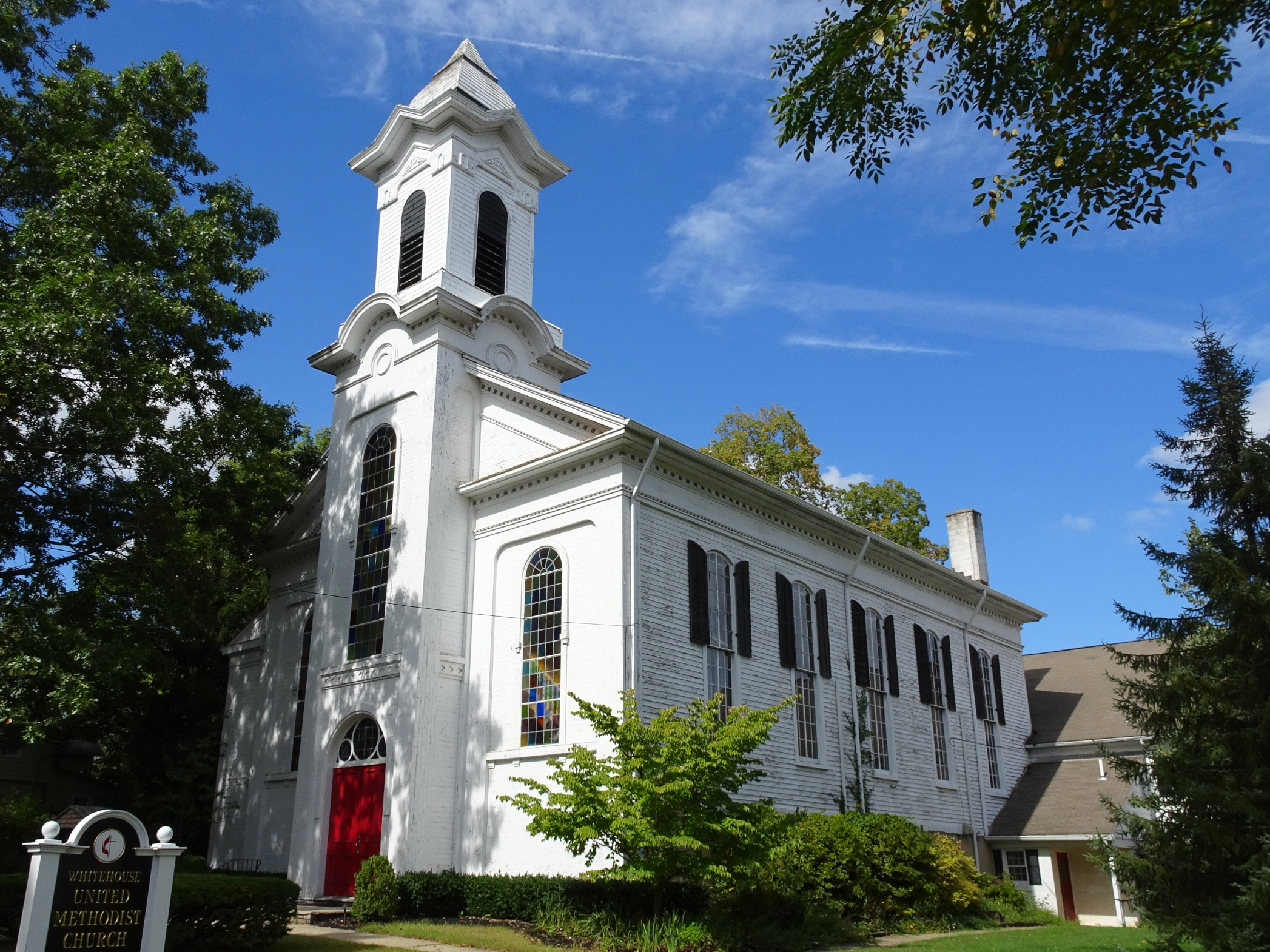
Whitehouse United Methodist Church

== Notable people ==
People who were born in, residents of, or otherwise closely associated with Whitehouse Station include:

- Taissa Farmiga (born 1994), actress.
- Robyn Kenney (born 1979), field hockey player.
- Tom Malloy (born 1974), actor and filmmaker.
- Ed Martin, politician who served as Chair of the Missouri Republican Party.
- James N. Pidcock (1836–1899), represented New Jersey's 4th congressional district in the United States House of Representatives from 1885 to 1889.
