= Lloyd R. Woodson =

American convict (born 1966)

- Born: January 31, 1966 (age 60); New York, U.S.
- Spouse: Tracey Everett
- Status: Incarcerated at New Jersey State Prison
- Conviction: Prior conviction in 1997: Criminal possession of a weapon.
- Criminal charges: Various firearms charges in 2010 at state and federal level
- Penalty: Convicted and sentenced to 14-and-a-half years in prison

Lloyd R. Woodson (born January 31, 1966) is an American man whose arrest in central New Jersey on January 25, 2010, received national attention in the United States. Woodson was armed with a semi-automatic rifle and was wearing a ballistic vest at the time of his arrest. A subsequent search of his motel room uncovered a large cache of weapons, ammunition, and gear including a grenade launcher, a night vision scope, a police scanner, a Middle Eastern keffiyeh, and a number of maps. One was of Fort Drum, a U.S. military facility located five hours away, near the border of Canada in upstate New York.

Woodson said he intended to use the weapons for a violent crime but appeared to have been acting alone. The government did not find any evidence of association with terrorist groups or a terrorist plot.

On January 26, 2010, Woodson was charged in state court with various criminal charges. Bail was set at $75,000. On January 29, he was charged in federal court, and consented to be held without bail. On February 25, a county grand jury indicted Woodson for attempted armed robbery (second degree), possession of a firearm for unlawful purpose, unlawful possession of a rifle, possession of a defaced firearm, possession of hollow-point bullets, and possession of high-capacity ammunition magazines. A defense psychiatrist said that Woodson was competent to stand trial, but was suffering from paranoid schizophrenia and incapable of carrying out the crimes with which he was charged. He was convicted and sentenced on September 28, 2012, to 14 1/2 years in New Jersey State Prison.

== Personal life ==
Woodson, 43 years old at the time of his arrest, is an African American man from Reston, Virginia, where he had lived less than a year after abandoning his wife and family. He had previously lived in District Heights, Maryland, and Queens and Brooklyn, New York.

Woodson joined the U.S. Navy in February 1988, serving aboard the USS Orion, a submarine tender. He deserted in April 1989.

On or about April 10, 1997 he was convicted by a Kings County Supreme Court jury of criminal possession of a weapon in Brooklyn, New York – a felony punishable with a prison term greater than one year. At this time, eight years after he deserted the Navy, he was returned to the Navy's custody. He was given a dishonorable discharge in August 1997.

== Arrest ==
Woodson had been inside the QuickChek convenience store on Easton Turnpike in Branchburg, New Jersey for approximately 40 minutes when a female convenience store clerk phoned the police to report a person behaving suspiciously. Officers responding to the call at 3:55 am reportedly encountered an "extremely nervous" Woodson, who was wearing a green military-style jacket with a "large bulge" in the front. Upon being questioned by the investigating officer, Woodson ran out of the back of the store, toward the nearby Regency Trailer Park. Officers found him hiding in the bushes, drew their guns and ordered him to surrender; he was tackled and subdued with pepper spray.

Woodson was wearing a military-style ballistic vest with a reinforced front steel plate. Concealed under his green, military-style jacket was a loaded semiautomatic Bushmaster rifle, which had a defaced serial number and had the upper receiver changed to the .50 Beowulf instead of the stock .223‑caliber (5.56 mm) upper. Also concealed under Woodson's jacket were four additional high-capacity magazines all loaded with ammunition, some of which were hollow points. Branchburg Police Chief, Brian Fitzgerald, who was concerned that Woodson's .50‑caliber bullets could penetrate officers' protective vests, "police car door and maybe through the other side of their police car", awarded the Exceptional Duty Award to three Branchburg police officers who responded to the Woodson report.

Detectives subsequently searched Woodson's room at the Red Mill Inn motel in Branchburg, where he had been staying for a week. They found a cache of weapons and equipment including another Bushmaster .308‑caliber semiautomatic rifle with a defaced serial number and a flash suppressor, a 37 mm Cobray flare launcher, a second bulletproof vest, a Russian-made rifle-mountable Nightsight Illuminator NP75 night vision scope, a police scanner, and hundreds of rounds of .50‑caliber and .308‑caliber ammunition, both ball-type and hollow-point bullets, as well as military wear, and garrison equipment.

According to a New Jersey court filing, Woodson had waived his Miranda rights. He said he bought the firearms on the streets of New York, obliterated the serial numbers on them, and brought them to New Jersey from Virginia. Somerset County Prosecutor Wayne Forrest said that for private citizens to have this type of armament is "quite unusual in Somerset County."

Also in his room were a detailed map of the Fort Drum U.S. military facility in upstate New York near the Canada–US border, a five-hours' drive from Branchburg, and a map of a town in a state other than New Jersey. NBC reported that the map of Fort Drum was a concern to authorities, but the FBI found no link between him and recognized terrorism groups. Detectives also found a traditional red-and-white Middle Eastern keffiyeh.

== Investigation and reactions ==
CNN journalists Wolf Blitzer and Rick Sanchez explored whether there was a terrorist link on January 26, 2010. An editorial in The Washington Times drew parallels with Nidal Malik Hasan. It said "When a man is apprehended with a cache of weapons, body armor, a map of a military installation and jihadist personal effects, the natural response of most Americans is to assume the situation is terrorist-related" and suggested the Obama administration's definition of terrorism was too narrow.

The Associated Press reported that the weapons and the map raised questions about whether Woodson was planning an attack on Fort Drum. The Somerset County prosecutor Wayne Forrest did not comment on whether he thought Woodson had been planning to attack the New York facility. Fort Drum's garrison commander, Col. Kenneth Riddle, issued a statement on January 27, 2010, saying the garrison had been notified immediately when the map was discovered in Woodson's possession; he believed the post was secure due to security measures already in place.

== State proceedings, conviction, and sentencing ==
Woodson was charged in state court on January 26, 2010, with second-degree unlawful possession of weapons, fourth-degree possession of prohibited defaced firearms and prohibited weapons- armor penetrating bullets, fourth degree possession of large capacity ammunition magazine, obstruction of justice, and resisting arrest. Bail was set by a New Jersey Superior Court Judge John Pursel in Somerville at $75,000.

On February 25, 2010, Woodson was indicted by a Somerset County grand jury on numerous charges, including second-degree attempted robbery and multiple weapons offenses, including second-degree possession of a firearm for an unlawful purpose and fourth-degree possession of hollow-point bullets. Chanel Hudson, Woodson's public defender on the state charges, noted that she has not yet received all of the discovery. Hudson said that attempted robbery was not an initial charge, and would like to see the evidence they have to support it.

On April 10, 2010, Woodson pleaded not guilty to the charges against him. On August 20, 2010, his defense lawyer asserted in New Jersey Superior Court that a defense psychiatrist's report indicated Woodson is competent to stand trial, but has paranoid schizophrenia, “which rendered him incapable of committing the crimes he’s charged with.” Woodson was sentenced by Judge Reed to 14 1/2 years in New Jersey State Prison on September 28, 2012, and must serve 10 years and 8 months before he becomes eligible for parole.

== Federal proceedings ==
The day after the arrest, the FBI indicated its preliminary finding that Woodson did not appear to have a link to any known terrorist groups, nor a specific terrorist plot. It stressed that the matter was still under investigation. After initial investigation and meeting with local authorities, the FBI and the local Bureau of Alcohol, Tobacco, Firearms and Explosives determined that, despite the amount of firepower uncovered, the incident was not terror-related. Former FBI agent Brad Garrett commented that unless they could link Woodson to a specific group, the FBI was unlikely to say it was terror-related, adding "For whatever reason, they feel like this doesn't rise to be prosecuted in federal court."

Subsequently, federal authorities charged Woodson in a criminal complaint with violating the federal law prohibiting a felon previously convicted of a weapons offense from possessing firearms. He appeared briefly in federal court on January 29, 2010, before U.S. Magistrate Judge Madeline Cox Arleo in Newark. He was assigned a public defender and waived his right to a detention hearing, and his lawyer said he would consent to being held in custody without bail.

The prosecutor told the judge that Woodson admitted in an interview that he intended to use the weapons in furtherance of a violent crime, though the prosecutor did not explain further, and the U.S. attorney's office spokesman said he would not elaborate. The federal charge carries a potential sentence of 10 years in prison, with a $250,000 fine.

U.S. Attorney's Office spokesman Greg Reinert indicated that, given the detainer on him for the federal charge, Woodson would not be released even should he succeed at making bail at the county level.
