= Whitehouse, New Jersey =

Populated place in Hunterdon County, New Jersey, US

- Unincorporated community
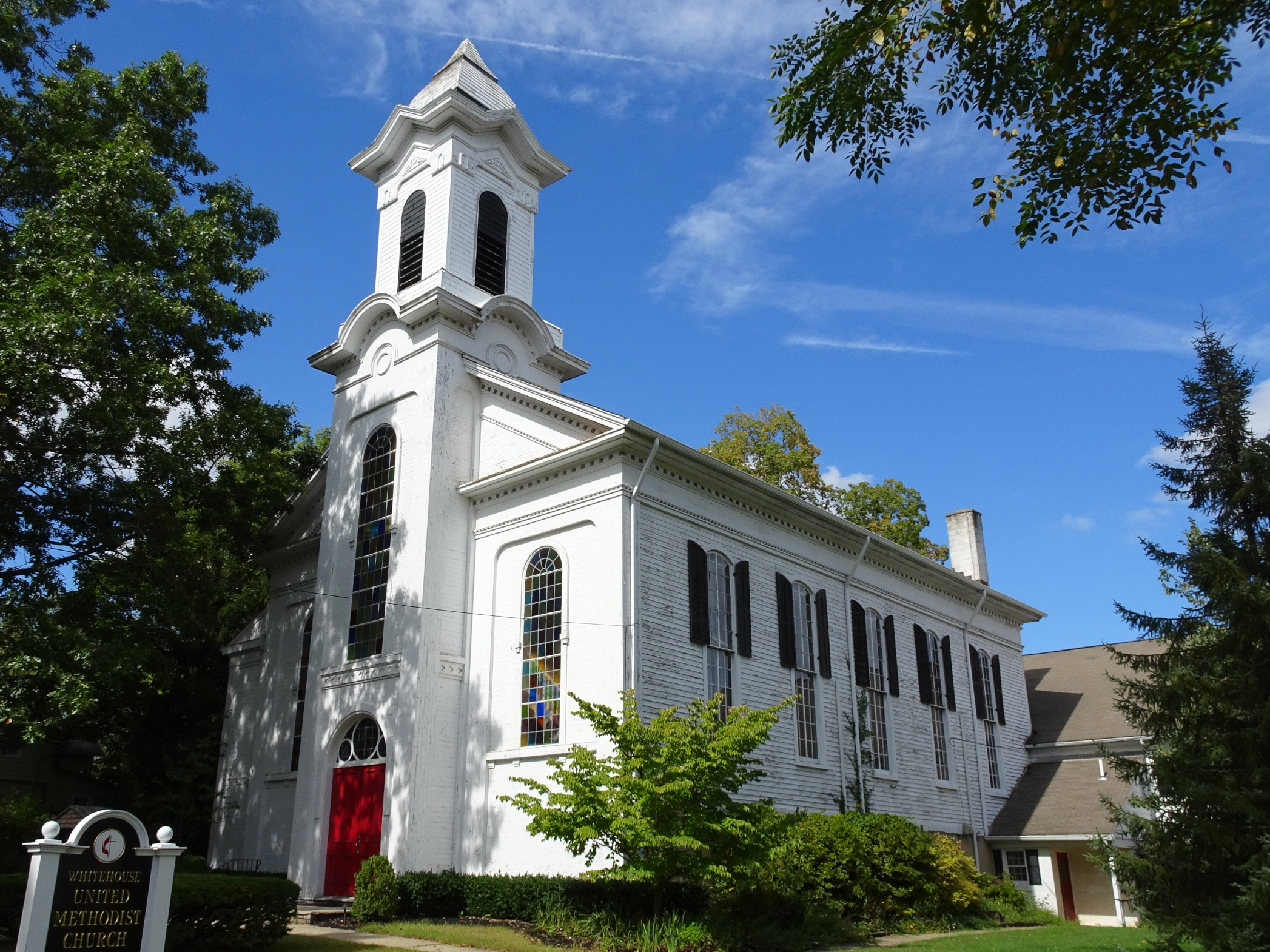
- Whitehouse United Methodist Church

- Location within Hunterdon County, New Jersey Location within New Jersey Location within the United States
- Coordinates: 40°37′06″N 74°44′40″W
- Country: United States
- State: New Jersey
- County: Hunterdon
- Township: Readington
- Elevation: 210 ft (64 m)
- ZIP Code: 08888
- Area code: 908
- GNIS feature ID: 0881798

Whitehouse, also spelled White House, is an unincorporated community located within Readington Township in Hunterdon County, New Jersey. The community lies along the former Jersey Turnpike (now U.S. Route 22), just west of Mechanicsville. The Whitehouse–Mechanicsville Historic District, which includes historic places in both Whitehouse and Mechanicsville, was added to the National Register of Historic Places on March 17, 2015.

== History ==
In 1722, Abraham Van Horne purchased 490 acres (2.0 km^{2}) in Readington along the Rockaway Creek. There, he built a grist mill and saw mill. Around 1750, he built a white plastered wall tavern on the creek where the Jersey Turnpike crossed (this is now the corner of Washington Street and U.S. Route 22). The tavern began to be referred to as the "White House" by travellers. The village, which sprang up to the east of the tavern also carried this name. Stones from the original tavern can be seen along the retaining wall of the Daughters of the American Revolution cemetery, where the tavern once stood. The community of White House stretched along the Jersey Turnpike (now Route 22 and Old Route 28), which was the main street. The settlement included taverns, stores, grist mills, an academy, a Dutch Reformed Church and numerous houses.

Nearby Whitehouse Station, which also indirectly took the name from the tavern, was not built up until 1848 when an extension of the Somerville and Easton Railroad was built.

== Gallery ==
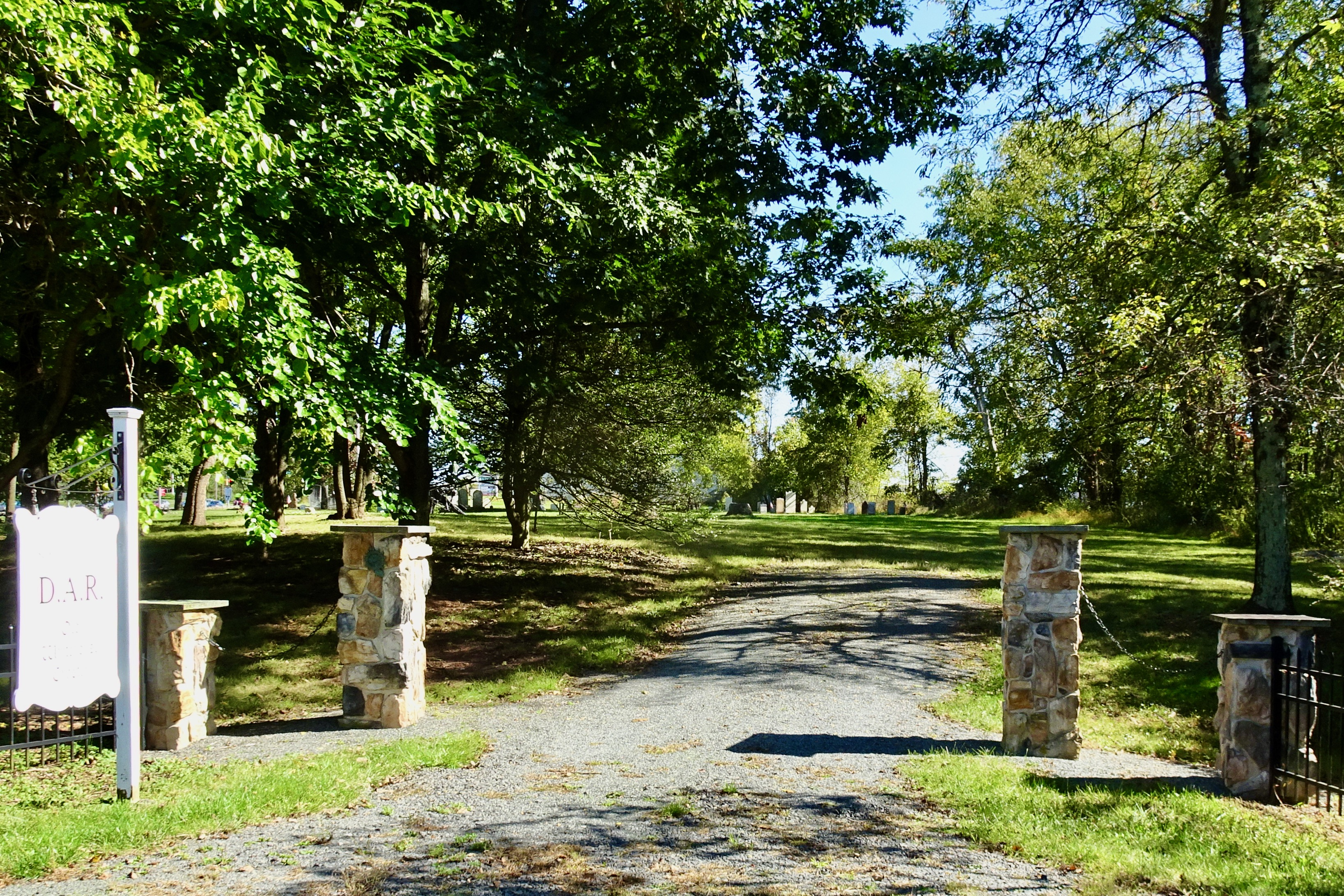
Entrance to Memorial Park Cemetery

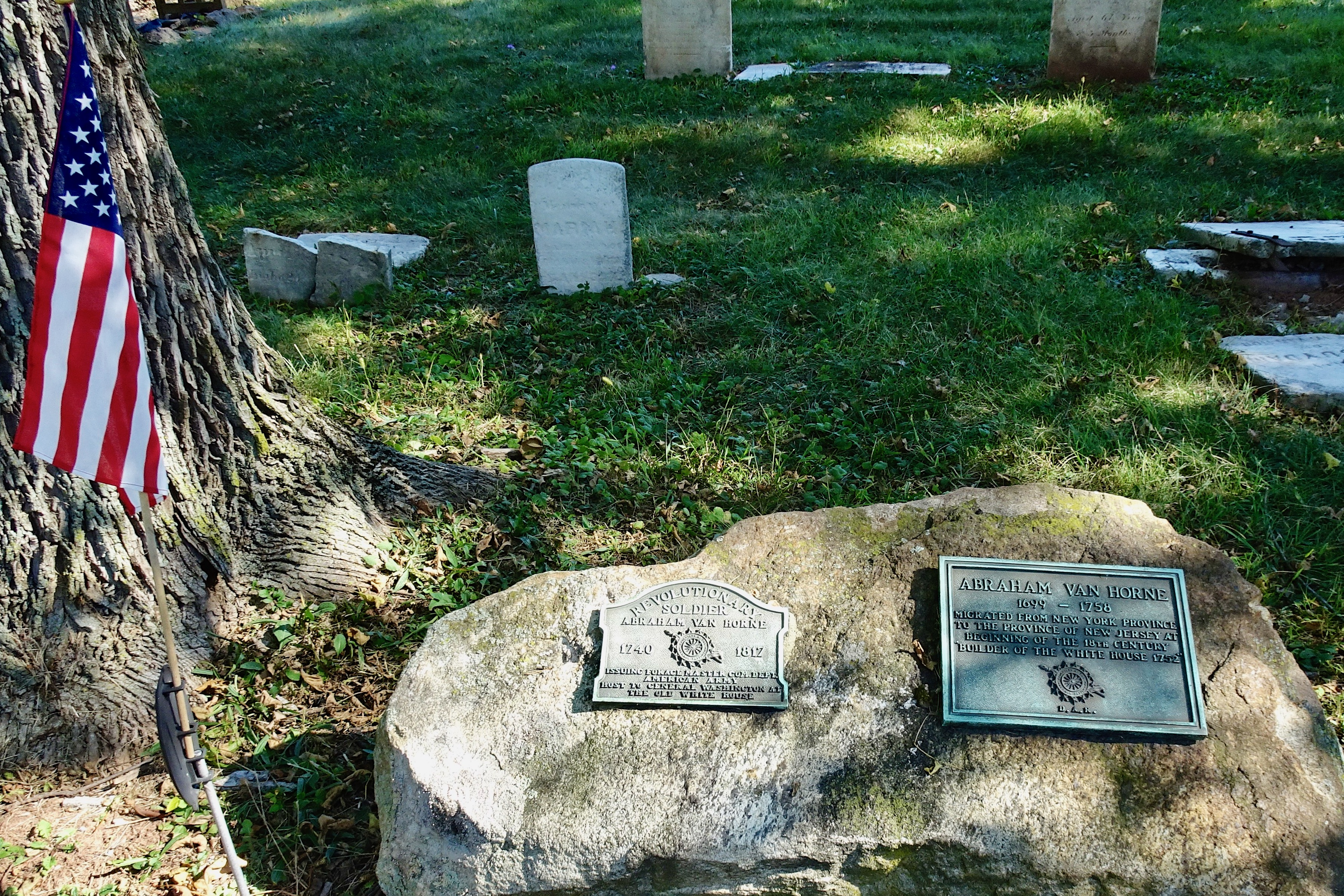
Monument to Abraham Van Horne and his son Abraham
