= Rockaway Creek (New Jersey) =

River in New Jersey, United States

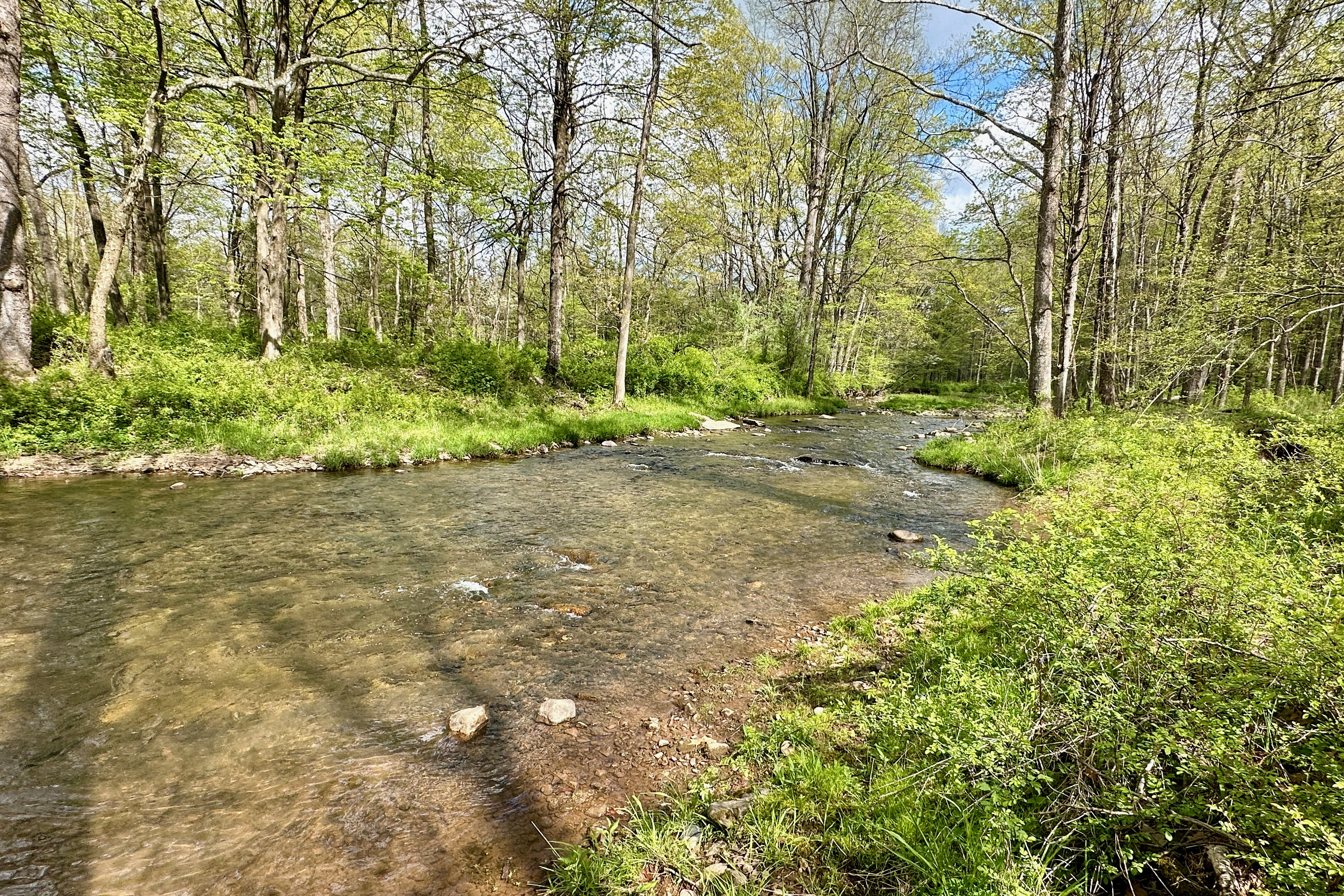
- Rockaway Creek near Oldwick

Location
- Country: United States
- State: New Jersey
- County: Hunterdon County

Physical characteristics
- Source
  - location: Fairmount
  - coordinates: 40°44′55″N 74°46′18″W
- Mouth: Lamington River
  - location: Readington Township
  - coordinates: 40°37′33″N 74°42′44″W

Basin features
- River system: Raritan River
- GNIS feature ID: 879753

Rockaway Creek is a tributary of the Lamington River in Hunterdon County, New Jersey in the United States.

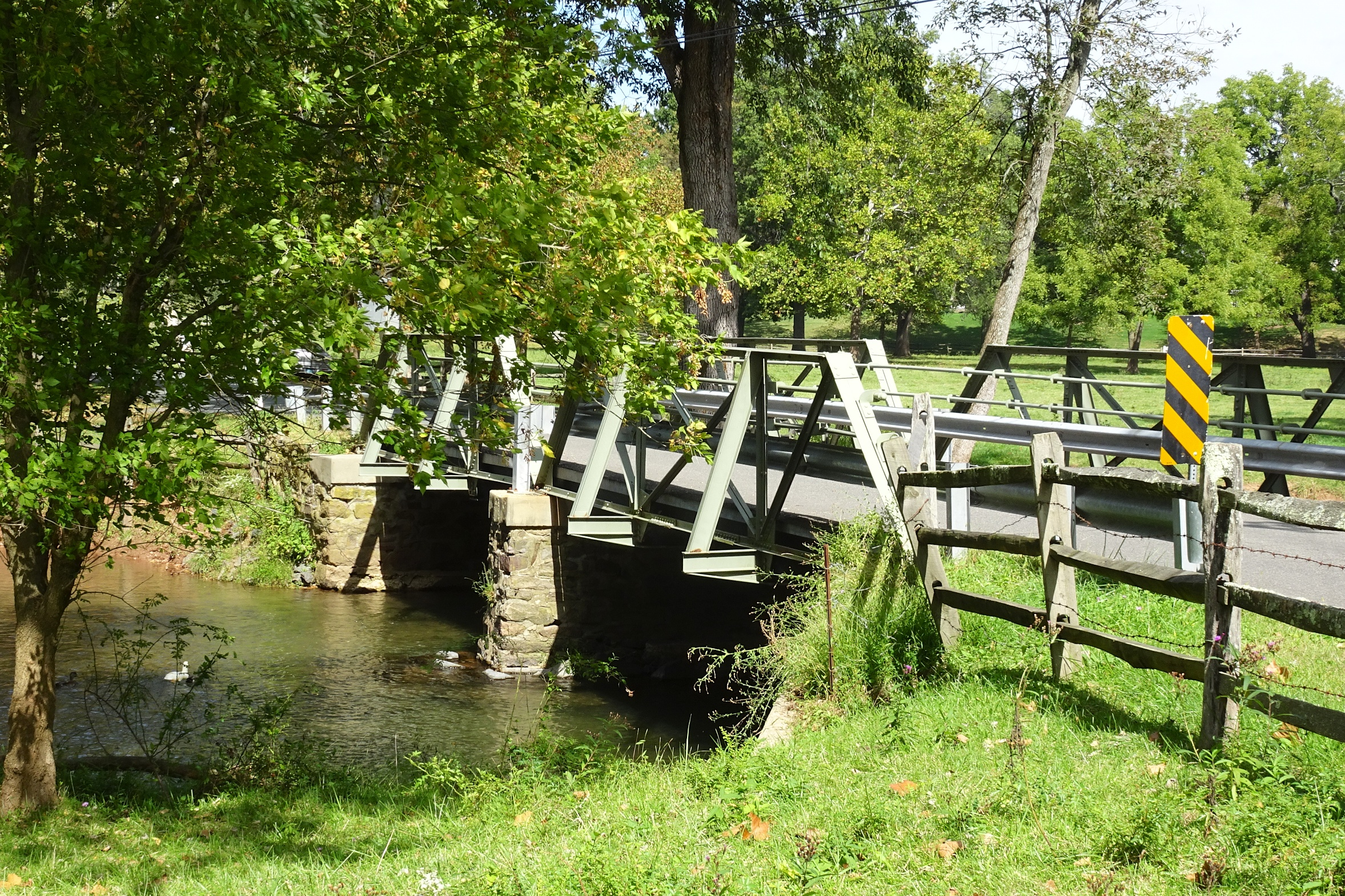
Truss bridge on Mill Road, Whitehouse, New Jersey over the Rockaway Creek, listed in the Whitehouse-Mechanicsville Historic District.

== See also ==
- List of rivers of New Jersey
