= The Ryland Inn =

Historic house in Hunterdon County, New Jersey

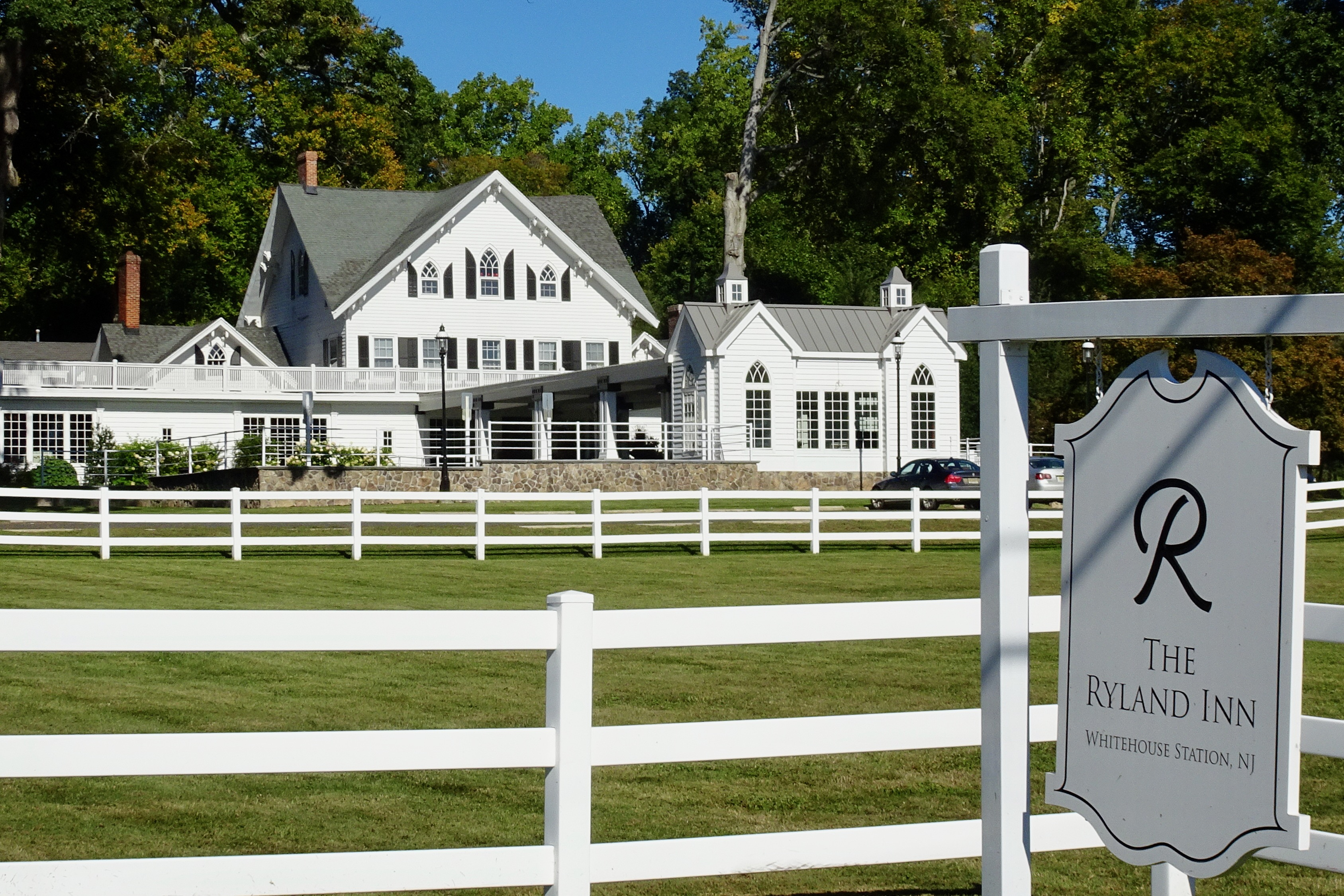
- The Ryland Inn in 2016
- Interactive map of The Ryland Inn

Restaurant information
- Location: 115 Old Hwy. 28, Whitehouse Station, New Jersey, 08889, United States
- Coordinates: 40.617986°N 74.741975°W
- Website: rylandinnnj.com

The Ryland Inn is a restaurant in Readington Township, New Jersey, that won the James Beard Mid-Atlantic region top prize. It won several awards and was visited by then-president Ronald Reagan.

== History ==
The building was built sometime in the late 1700s by Colonel David Sanderson. Craig C. Shelton took over as chef and managing partner in 1991 at the age of 30. In 2000, Chef Craig Shelton won the James Beard Mid-Atlantic region top prize for the restaurant. The restaurant, located at 111 Old Highway 28, Whitehouse Station, NJ, closed in 2007 after the discovery of a crack in the major load-bearing beam of the building and after a pipe burst in the basement causing flooding. Jeanne and Frank Cretella of Landmark Hospitality announced in August 2011 that they plan to reopen the Ryland Inn as a restaurant and banquet hall.
