= Hunterdon County, New Jersey =

County in New Jersey, United States

- County
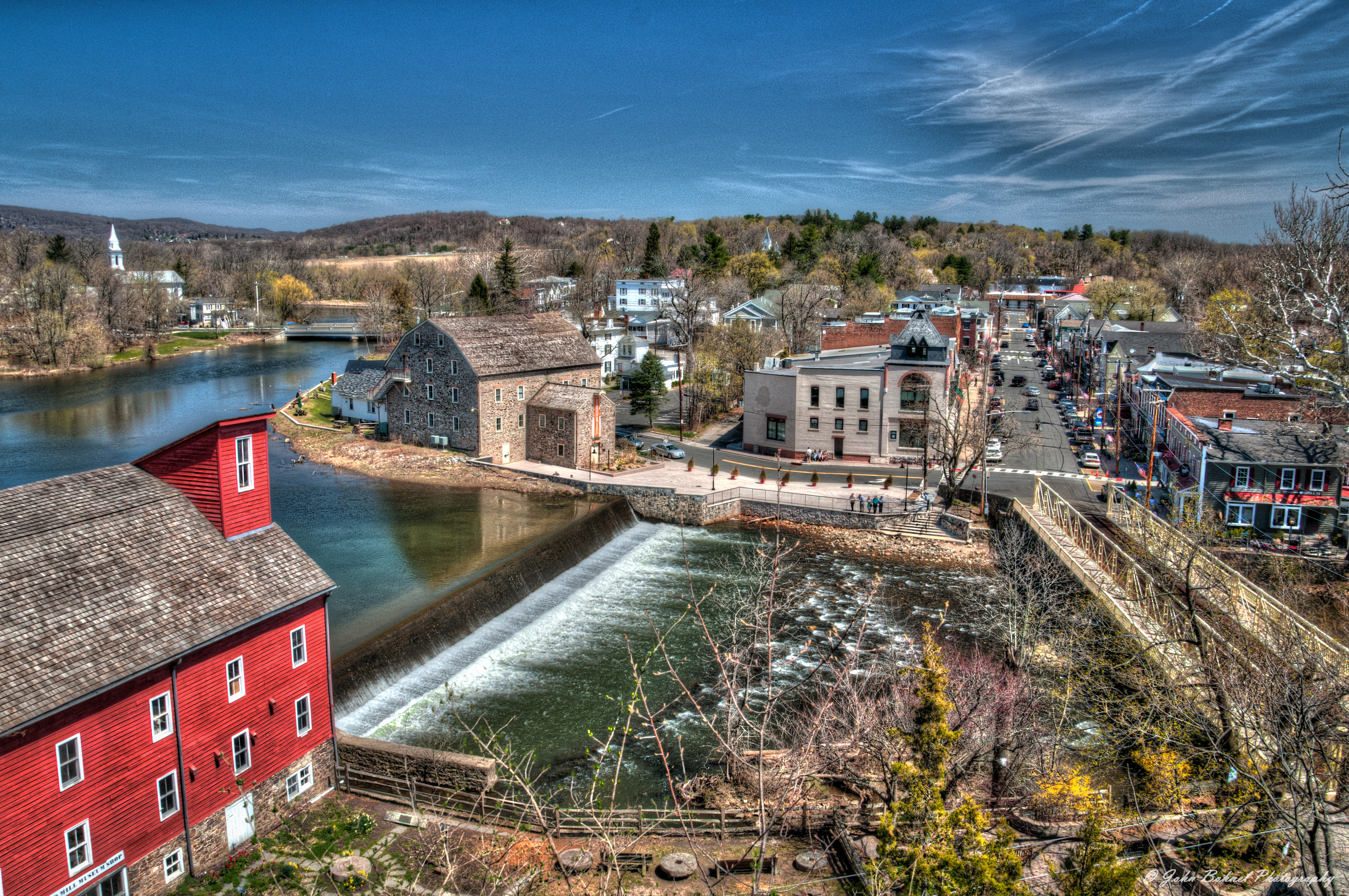
- A view of Clinton, New Jersey with Red Mill (in the foreground) and the downtown district across the Raritan River (in the background)

- Flag Seal Logo

- Location within the U.S. state of New Jersey
- Interactive map of Hunterdon County, New Jersey
- Coordinates: 40.57°N 74.92°W
- Country: United States
- State: New Jersey
- Founded: 1714
- Named for: Robert Hunter
- Seat: Flemington
- Largest municipality: Raritan Township (population); Readington Township (area)

Government
  - Commission Director: Zachary T. Rich (R, term ends December 31, 2023)

Area
  - Total: 437.40 sq mi (1,132.9 km^{2})
  - Land: 427.84 sq mi (1,108.1 km^{2})
  - Water: 9.56 sq mi (24.8 km^{2}) 2.2%

Population (2020)
  - Total: 128,947
  - Estimate (2025): 131,781 ▲
  - Density: 301.39/sq mi (116.37/km^{2})
- Time zone: UTC−5 (Eastern)
  - Summer (DST): UTC−4 (EDT)
- Congressional district: 7th
- Website: co.hunterdon.nj.us

Hunterdon County is a county located in the western section of the U.S. state of New Jersey. At the 2020 census, the county was the state's 4th-least populous county, with a population of 128,947, an increase of 598 (+0.5%) from the 2010 census count of 128,349. Its county seat is Flemington. The United States Census Bureau's Population Estimates Program estimated a 2025 population of 131,781, an increase of 2,834 (+2.2%) from the 2020 decennial census. The county is part of the Central Jersey region of the state.

In 2015, the county had a per capita personal income of $80,759, the third-highest in New Jersey and ranked 33rd of 3,113 counties in the United States. The Bureau of Economic Analysis ranked the county as having the 19th-highest per capita income of all 3,113 counties in the United States (and the highest in New Jersey) as of 2009. In 2011, Hunterdon County had the second-lowest level of child poverty of any county in the United States.

Geographically, much of the county lies in the Philadelphia metropolitan area, also known as the Delaware Valley. Local businesses and the Delaware Valley Regional High School carry the name. However, it is part of the New York-Northern New Jersey-Long Island metropolitan statistical area (MSA) and part of the larger New York-Newark Combined Statistical Area (CSA).

Hunterdon County was established on March 11, 1714, separating from Burlington County, at which time, aside from itself, it included all of present-day Morris, Sussex, and Warren counties. The rolling hills and rich soils which produce bountiful agricultural crops drew Native American tribes and then Europeans to the area.

== History ==
=== Etymology ===
Hunterdon County was named for Robert Hunter, a colonial governor of New Jersey. As language changes over time and location, so by the stemming of [s], and a [t] → [d] lenition of the name of his family seat of "Hunterston" in Ayrshire, Scotland, the name "Hunterdon" was derived.

=== Paleo Indians and Native Americans ===
Paleo Indians moved into Hunterdon County between 12,000 BCE and 11,000 BCE. The area was warming due to climate change. The Wisconsin Glacier in Warren and Sussex County was retreating northward. The area was that of Taiga/Boreal forests. Paleo Indians traveled in small groups in search of game and edible plants. They used spears made of bone, jasper or black chert. Their camp sites are difficult to find as they are many feet below the present surface.

Native Americans moved into the area but the time they arrived is unknown. Most have come from the Mississippi River area. Many tribes of the Delaware Nation lived in Hunterdon County especially along the Delaware River and in the Flemington area. These tribes were agricultural in nature, growing corn, beans and squash. Those that lived along the South Branch of the Raritan River fished and farmed. There was a Native American trail that went along the South Branch of the Raritan River (Philhower 1924).

=== European settlement ===
Land purchases from Native Americans occurred from 1688 to 1758. Large land purchases from Native Americans occurred in 1703, 1709 and 1710. Over 150,000 acres (610 km^{2}) were bought with metal knives and pots, clothing, blankets, barrels of rum or hard cider, guns, powder and shot allowing for European settlers to enter into Hunterdon County in the early 18th century. After 1760, nearly all Native Americans left New Jersey and relocated to eastern Canada or the Mississippi River area.

The first European settlers were Col. John Reading who settled in Reading Township in 1704 they called him Sir Reading of Readington and John Holcombe who settled in Lambertville in 1705.

Hunterdon County was separated from Burlington County on March 11, 1714. At that time Hunterdon County was large, going from Assunpink Creek near Trenton to the New York State line which at that time was about 10 miles (16 km) north of Port Jervis, New York.

On March 15, 1739, Morris County (which at the time included what would later become Sussex County and Warren County) was separated from Hunterdon County. The boundary between Hunterdon and Somerset counties is evidence of the old Keith Line which separated the provinces of West Jersey and East Jersey. Hunterdon County was reduced in area on February 22, 1838, with the formation of Mercer County from portions of Burlington County, Hunterdon County and Middlesex County. In February 1839, the remaining portion of Hopewell Township was annexed to Mercer County. On March 13, 1844, Hopewell Township returned to Hunterdon County while Tewksbury Township was annexed by Somerset County but in February 1845 both of these changes were repealed. Since then, the county boundaries have remained the same.

Hunterdon County was being affected by industrialization in the state and nation, mining speculation in northwest New Jersey, and competitors constructing railroads. The Elizabethtown and Somerville Railroad leased a section to White House just south of Tewksbury Township in 1848.

=== 20th Century to Present ===
In 1935, Hunterdon County and its county seat, Flemington, became the center of worldwide attention as the site of the infamous Lindbergh kidnapping trial, in which Bruno Hauptmann was convicted and sentenced to death of the kidnapping and murder of aviator Charles Lindbergh's son, Charles Lindbergh Jr. The trial, which lasted five weeks, received sensational media coverage, saw thousands of spectators in attendance, including over 700 reporters and hundreds of communications technicians. This led to many observers calling it the "Trial of the Century" for its era.

In the 1950s, the first sections of Interstate 78 opened up in the western portions of the county. By 1968, the interstate would be completed through the county, enabling commuters easy access to the metropolitan regions of Northern and Central Jersey via Interstate 287. With real estate values soaring along the 78 corridor, multiple companies began relocating into Hunterdon in search of a more tranquil corporate atmosphere, including Merck & Co, ExxonMobil, New York Life, Chubb, and others. With growing towns and shopping areas, as well as relaxing rural areas, Hunterdon County is a far stretch from the urban areas stereotypically associated with New Jersey. Due to the presence of natural habitats with many homes in wooded settings, Hunterdon County was recently found to have the third highest case rate of Lyme disease out of all counties in the United States.

== Geography and geology ==
=== Geography ===
According to the U.S. Census Bureau, as of the 2020 Census, the county had a total area of 437.4 square miles (1,133 km^{2}), of which 427.84 square miles (1,108.1 km^{2}) was land (97.8%) and 9.56 square miles (24.8 km^{2}) was water (2.2%).

Much of the county is hilly, with several hills rising to 1,000 feet (300 m) in elevation. The highest points are two areas in Lebanon Township, one on the Morris County line, both reaching approximately 1,060 feet (320 m) above sea level. The first is at Smith on the Morris County line and the second is north of the area called Little Brook. This area is known as the Highlands of New Jersey. The lowest elevation is where the Mercer County line reaches the Delaware River, approximately 50 feet (15 m) above sea level. The county is drained by the Musconetcong River in the north. The river flows in a southwest direction. The Lamington River drains the county in the east. The central portion of the county is drained by the South Branch of the Raritan River. The Delaware River drains the western side of the county.

=== Geology ===
Around 500 million years ago, a chain of volcanic islands shaped like an arch collided with proto North America and rode over the top of the North American plate. The rock from the islands created the highlands of Hunterdon County as there was a shallow sea where Hunterdon County is now located. Then around four hundred million years ago, a small continent that was long and thin, collided with proto North America. This collision created compression, which caused heat. The Paleozoic sediment of shale and sandstone folded and faulted. The heat allowed the igneous rock to bend, thus Hunterdon County was born.

The African plate which later collided with North America created more folding and faulting, especially in the southern Appalachians. Then the African and North America plates tore and drifted away from each other.

The Wisconsin glacier that entered into New Jersey around 21,000 BCE and then melted around 13,000 BCE did not reach Hunterdon County. However, there are glacial outwash deposits from streams and rivers that flowed from the glacier southward depositing rock and sediment.

Hunterdon County has two geophysical provinces. The first is the Highlands which is the western section of the county. The other is the Piedmont which is the eastern and southern section of the county. The Highlands account for one-third of the area and Piedmont accounts for two-thirds of the county. The Highlands are part of the Reading Prong. Limestone and shale over igneous rock comprise the Highlands. Piedmont includes the Hunterdon Plateau and the Raritan Valley Lowlands which are 150 to 300 feet (46 to 91 m) above sea level. Piedmont is made up of shale and sandstone.

=== Climate ===
Hunterdon has a humid continental climate which is hot-summer (Dfa) except in some higher northern areas where it is warm-summer (Dfb). The hardiness zone is mainly 6b except for some 6a in higher northern areas and 7a along the Delaware River in West Amwell Township. Average monthly temperatures in Clinton range from 29.0 °F in January to 74.0 °F in July, while in Flemington they range from 30.0 °F in January to 74.8 °F in July and in Lambertville they range from 31.1 °F in January to 75.7 °F in July.

Flemington, New Jersey

Climate chart (precipitation, max. and min. temperature)
J	F	M	A	M	J	J	A	S	O	N	D
3.8 37 19	3.2 41 22	4.3 50 28	4.3 62 38	4.6 72 47	4.6 81 57	5.2 85 62	3.7 83 61	4.3 77 53	4.5 65 41	3.8 54 33	4.3 42 25
- █ Average max. and min. temperatures in °F
- █ Precipitation totals in inches
- Source: The Weather Channel
Metric conversion
J	F	M	A	M	J	J	A	S	O	N	D
96 3 −7	80 5 −6	108 10 −2	109 17 3	117 22 8	118 27 14	131 29 17	93 28 16	109 25 12	114 18 5	97 12 1	109 6 −4
- █ Average max. and min. temperatures in °C
- █ Precipitation totals in mm

In recent years, average temperatures in the county seat of Flemington have ranged from a low of 19 °F (−7 °C) in January to a high of 85 °F (29 °C) in July, although a record low of −18 °F (−28 °C) was recorded in January 1984 and a record high of 106 °F (41 °C) was recorded in July 1936. Average monthly precipitation ranged from 3.16 inches (80 mm) in February to 5.16 inches (131 mm) in July.

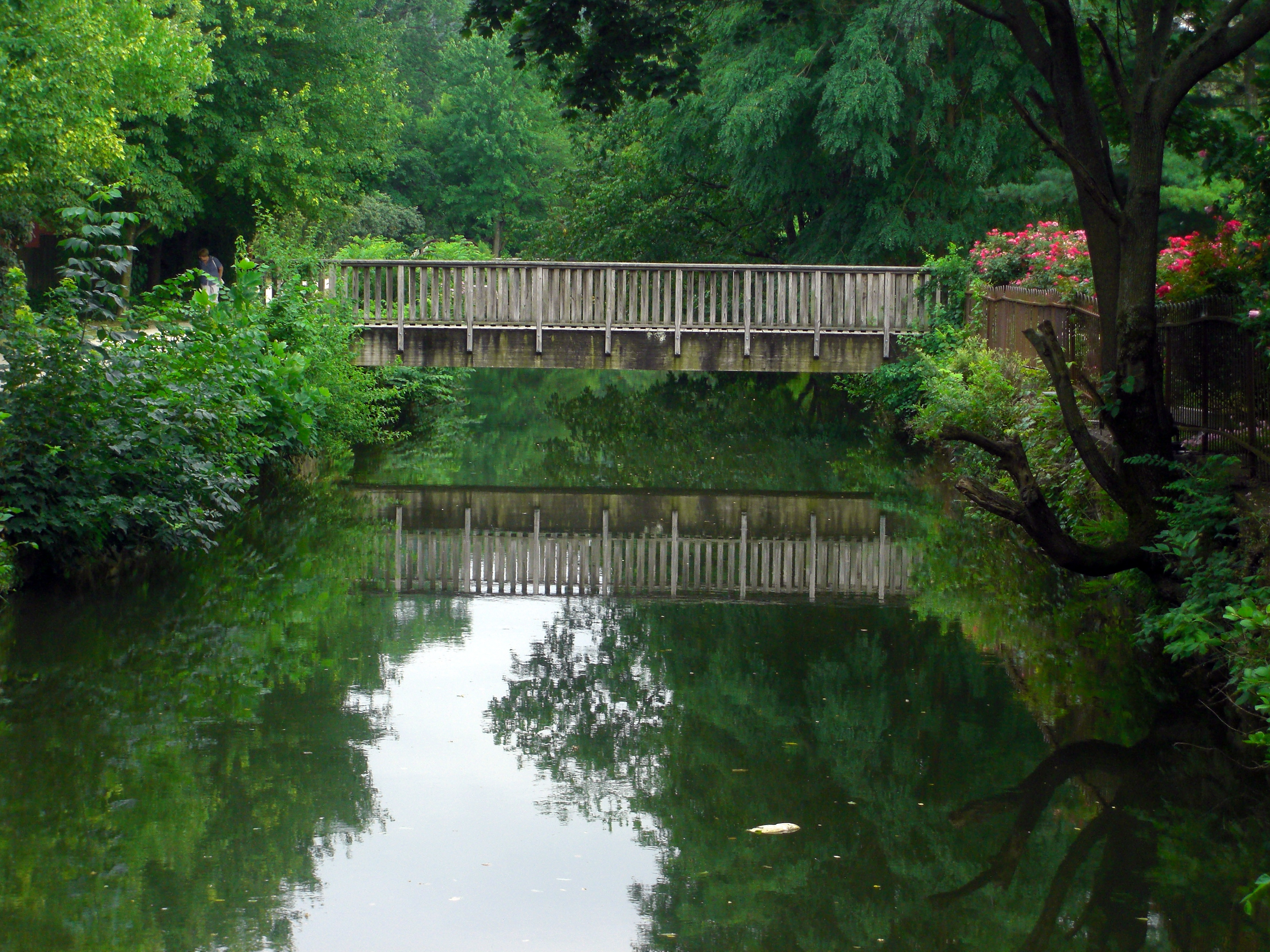
The Delaware and Raritan Canal in Lambertville

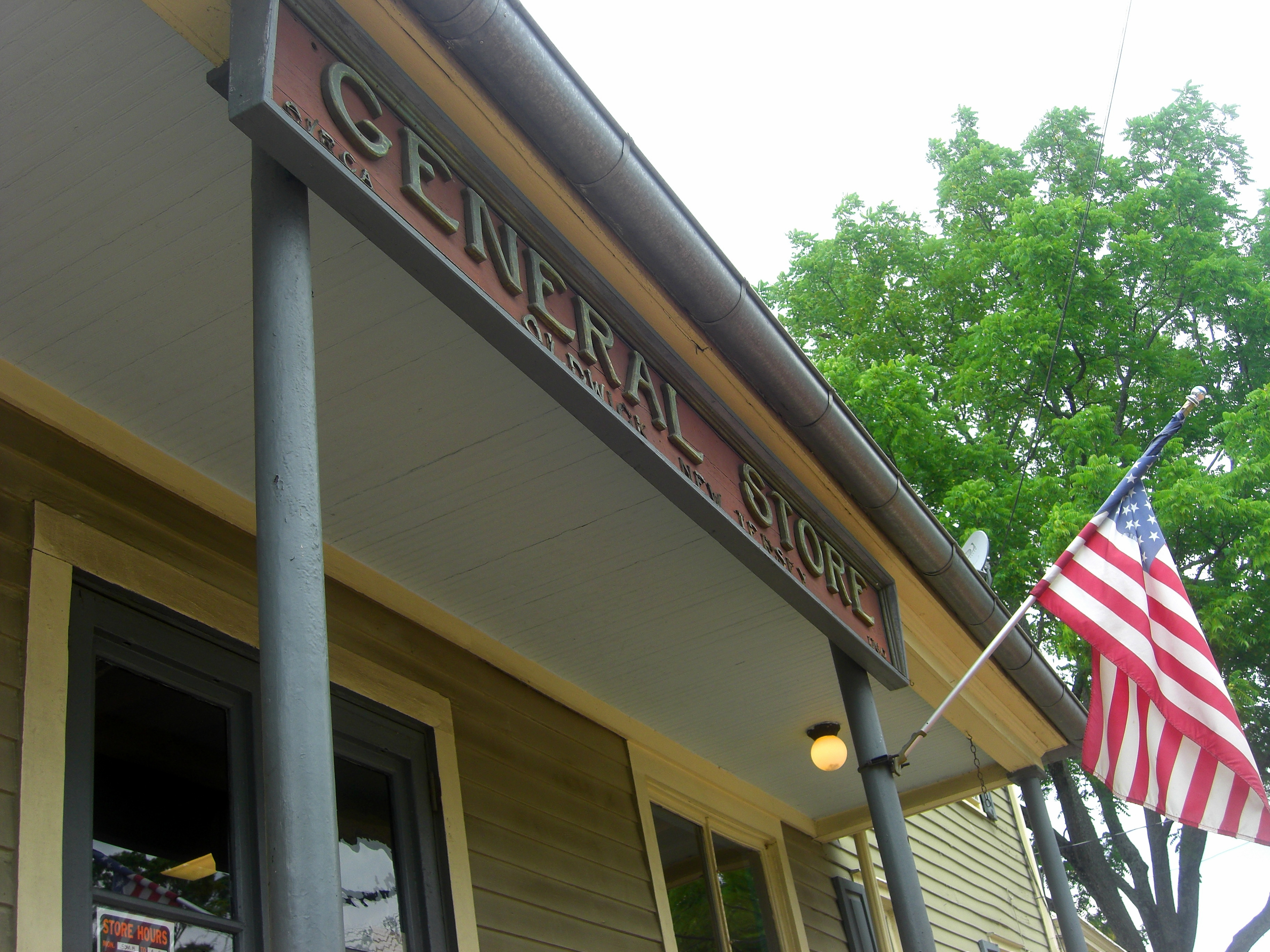
Oldwick General Store

== Demographics ==
Historical population
Census	Pop.	Note	%±
1790	20,153		—
1800	21,261		5.5%
1810	24,556		15.5%
1820	28,604		16.5%
1830	31,060		8.6%
1840	24,789	*	−20.2%
1850	28,990		16.9%
1860	33,654		16.1%
1870	36,963		9.8%
1880	38,570		4.3%
1890	35,355		−8.3%
1900	34,507		−2.4%
1910	33,569		−2.7%
1920	32,885		−2.0%
1930	34,728		5.6%
1940	36,766		5.9%
1950	42,736		16.2%
1960	54,107		26.6%
1970	69,718		28.9%
1980	87,361		25.3%
1990	107,776		23.4%
2000	121,989		13.2%
2010	128,349		5.2%
2020	128,947		0.5%
2025 (est.)	131,781		2.2%
Historical sources: 1790-1990; 1970-2010 2010 2020 * = Lost territory in previous decade.

=== 2020 census ===
As of the 2020 census, the county had a population of 128,947. The median age was 46.8 years. 19.3% of residents were under the age of 18 and 19.3% of residents were 65 years of age or older. For every 100 females there were 96.7 males, and for every 100 females age 18 and over there were 94.9 males age 18 and over.

The racial makeup of the county was 82.8% White, 2.5% Black or African American, 0.2% American Indian and Alaska Native, 4.4% Asian, <0.1% Native Hawaiian and Pacific Islander, 3.2% from some other race, and 6.9% from two or more races. Hispanic or Latino residents of any race comprised 8.5% of the population.

41.7% of residents lived in urban areas, while 58.3% lived in rural areas.

There were 48,978 households in the county, of which 28.9% had children under the age of 18 living in them. Of all households, 60.0% were married-couple households, 14.2% were households with a male householder and no spouse or partner present, and 20.6% were households with a female householder and no spouse or partner present. About 23.1% of all households were made up of individuals and 10.8% had someone living alone who was 65 years of age or older.

There were 51,687 housing units, of which 5.2% were vacant. Among occupied housing units, 82.4% were owner-occupied and 17.6% were renter-occupied. The homeowner vacancy rate was 1.3% and the rental vacancy rate was 5.2%.

=== Racial and ethnic composition ===
Hunterdon County, New Jersey – Racial and ethnic composition Note: the US Census treats Hispanic/Latino as an ethnic category. This table excludes Latinos from the racial categories and assigns them to a separate category. Hispanics/Latinos may be of any race.
Race / Ethnicity (NH = Non-Hispanic)	Pop 1980	Pop 1990	Pop 2000	Pop 2010	Pop 2020	% 1980	% 1990	% 2000	% 2010	% 2020
White alone (NH)	84,682	102,400	112,473	112,607	104,667	96.93%	95.01%	92.20%	87.74%	81.17%
Black or African American alone (NH)	1,107	2,119	2,638	3,233	3,030	1.27%	1.97%	2.16%	2.52%	2.35%
Native American or Alaska Native alone (NH)	57	104	119	97	92	0.07%	0.10%	0.10%	0.08%	0.07%
Asian alone (NH)	498	1,373	2,332	4,155	5,677	0.57%	1.27%	1.91%	3.24%	4.40%
Native Hawaiian or Pacific Islander alone (NH)	x	x	28	27	8	x	x	0.02%	0.02%	0.01%
Other race alone (NH)	109	48	114	166	535	0.12%	0.04%	0.09%	0.13%	0.41%
Mixed race or Multiracial (NH)	x	x	914	1,342	4,009	x	x	0.75%	1.05%	3.11%
Hispanic or Latino (any race)	908	1,732	3,371	6,722	10,929	1.04%	1.61%	2.76%	5.24%	8.48%
Total	87,361	107,776	121,989	128,349	128,947	100.00%	100.00%	100.00%	100.00%	100.00%

=== 2010 census ===
The 2010 United States census counted 128,349 people, 47,169 households, and 34,339 families in the county. The population density was 300 per square mile (120/km^{2}). There were 49,487 housing units at an average density of 115.7 per square mile (44.7/km^{2}). The racial makeup was 91.36% (117,264) White, 2.69% (3,451) Black or African American, 0.13% (167) Native American, 3.26% (4,181) Asian, 0.03% (37) Pacific Islander, 1.22% (1,570) from other races, and 1.31% (1,679) from two or more races. Hispanic or Latino of any race were 5.24% (6,722) of the population.

Of the 47,169 households, 33.4% had children under the age of 18; 62.8% were married couples living together; 7% had a female householder with no husband present and 27.2% were non-families. Of all households, 22% were made up of individuals and 8.2% had someone living alone who was 65 years of age or older. The average household size was 2.62 and the average family size was 3.1.

23.5% of the population were under the age of 18, 6.9% from 18 to 24, 22.2% from 25 to 44, 34.6% from 45 to 64, and 12.7% who were 65 years of age or older. The median age was 43.5 years. For every 100 females, the population had 99.8 males. For every 100 females ages 18 and older there were 98.1 males.

== Economy ==
The Bureau of Economic Analysis calculated that the county's gross domestic product was $7.1 billion in 2021, which was ranked 16th in the state and was a 5.3% increase from the prior year.

Hunterdon County ranked as the 19th among the highest-income counties in the United States with a 2010 per capita income of $67,053. It ranks fourth among U.S. counties for household income according to the most recent data from the U.S. Census Bureau. Hunterdon County's median household income was $105,186, behind only Loudoun County and Fairfax County in Virginia, and Howard County, Maryland.

== Transportation ==
=== Roads and highways ===
As of May 2010, the county had a total of 1,412.33 miles (2,272.92 km) of roadways, of which 1,059.23 miles (1,704.67 km) were maintained by the local municipality, 237.73 miles (382.59 km) by Hunterdon County and 114.79 miles (184.74 km) by the New Jersey Department of Transportation and 0.58 miles (0.93 km) by the Delaware River Joint Toll Bridge Commission.

Many important roads pass through the county. They include state routes, such as Route 12, Route 29, Route 31, Route 173 and Route 179. Two U.S. Routes pass through the county, which are U.S. Route 22 and U.S. Route 202. The only limited access road that passes through is Interstate 78.

=== Public transportation ===
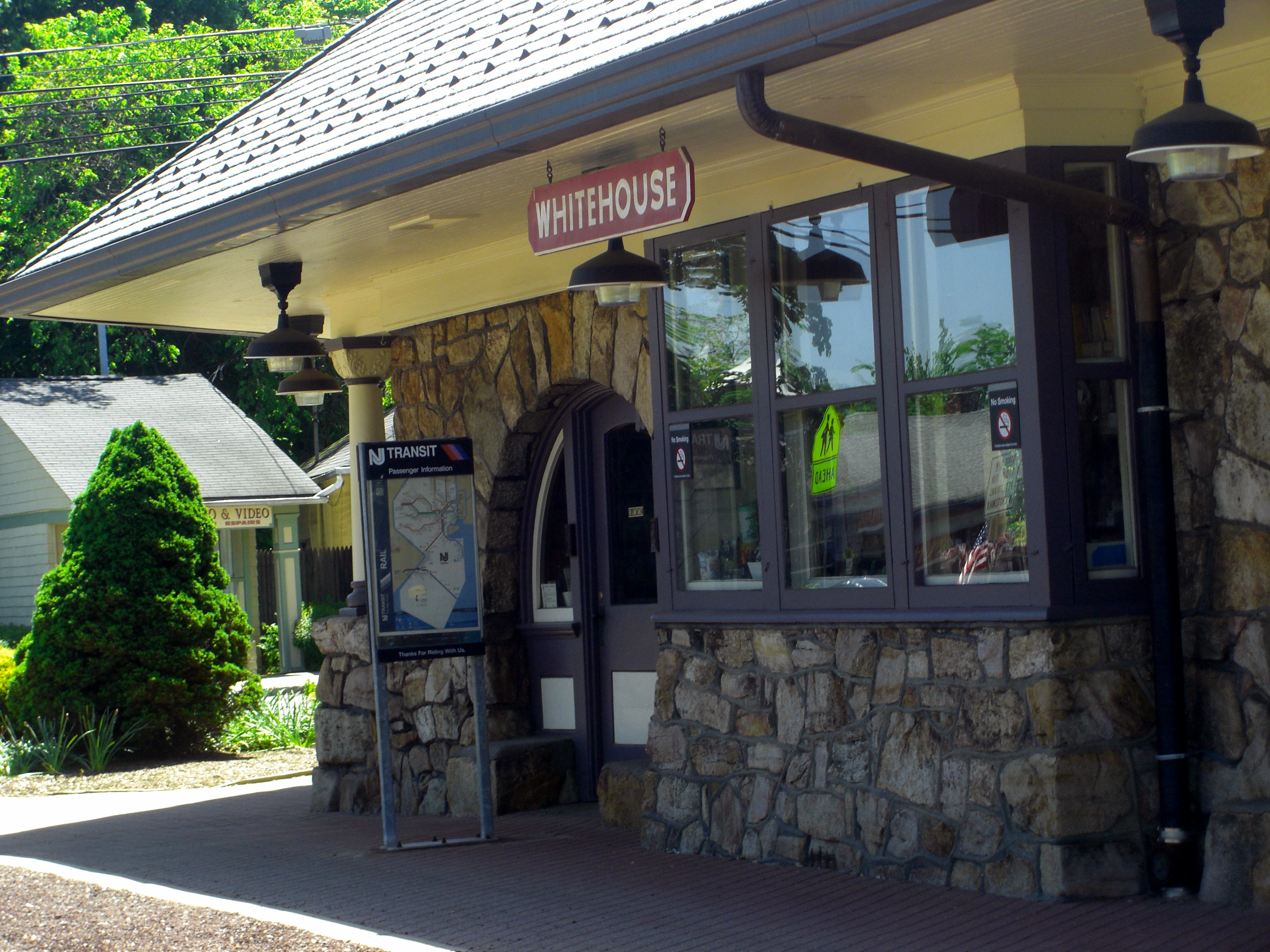
Whitehouse Station

Limited rail service to the northern part of the county from Newark Penn Station/New York Penn Station is provided to High Bridge, Annandale, Lebanon and Whitehouse Station by NJ Transit's Raritan Valley Line.

The Norfolk Southern Railway's Lehigh Line (formerly the mainline of the Lehigh Valley Railroad), runs through Hunterdon County.

In addition, The Hunterdon County LINK operates demand-response service across the county, as well as fixed-route service in Flemington. Trans-Bridge Lines also provides service to the Port Authority Bus Terminal in Midtown Manhattan, as well as several locations to the west in Pennsylvania, with Stops including Clinton, Flemington, Lambertville, and Frenchtown.

== Government ==
=== County government ===
Hunterdon County is governed by a Board of County Commissioners composed of five members who serve three-year terms of office at-large on a staggered basis, with either one or two seats up for election each year on a partisan basis as part of the November general election. At an annual reorganization meeting held each January, the Commissioners select one member to serve as the board's director and another to serve as deputy director. The Commissioner Board is the center of legislative and administrative responsibility and, as such, performs a dual role. As legislators, they draw up and adopt a budget, and in the role of administrators they are responsible for spending the funds they have appropriated. As of 2025, Hunterdon County's Commissioners are (with terms for director and deputy director ending every December 31):

Commissioner	Party, Residence, Term
Director Jeff Kuhl	R; Raritan Township, 2027
Deputy Director Susan Soloway	R; Franklin Township, 2027
John E. Lanza	R; Raritan Township, 2025
Zachary T. Rich	R; West Amwell Township, 2025
Shaun C. Van Doren	R; Tewksbury Township, 2026

Pursuant to Article VII Section II of the New Jersey State Constitution, each county in New Jersey is required to have three elected administrative officials known as "constitutional officers." These officers are the County Clerk and County Surrogate (both elected for five-year terms of office) and the County Sheriff (elected for a three-year term). Constitutional officers elected on a countywide basis are:

Title	Representative
County Clerk	Mary H. Melfi (R; Flemington, 2026),
Sheriff	Fredrick W. Brown (R; Alexandria Township, 2025)
Surrogate	Heidi Rohrbach (R; Kingwood Township, 2028).

The Hunterdon County Prosecutor is Renée M. Robeson, who was nominated by Governor of New Jersey Phil Murphy in 2021. Hunterdon County is a part of Vicinage 13 of the New Jersey Superior Court (along with Somerset County and Warren County), which is seated at the Somerset County Courthouse in Somerville, the county seat of Somerset County; the Assignment Judge for Vicinage 15 is Yolanda Ciccone. The Hunterdon County Courthouse is in Flemington.

In June 2022, the commissioners appointed Jeff Kuhl to fill the seat expiring in December 2024 that had been held by Mike Holt until he resigned from office. Kuhl will serve on an interim basis until the November 2022 general election, when voters will choose a candidate to serve the balance of the term of office. Democrats have not won a countywide office in Hunterdon County since 1982.

=== Federal representatives ===
Hunterdon County falls entirely within the 7th congressional district. For the 119th United States Congress, New Jersey's 7th congressional district is represented by Thomas Kean Jr. (R, Westfield).

=== State representatives ===
The 26 municipalities of Hunterdon County are represented by three Legislative Districts.

District	Senator	Assembly	Municipalities
15th	Shirley Turner (D)	Verlina Reynolds-Jackson (D) Anthony Verrelli (D)	Delaware Township, East Amwell Township, Frenchtown, Kingwood Township, Lambertville, Stockton, and West Amwell Township. The remainder of this district covers portions of Mercer County.
16th	Andrew Zwicker (D)	Mitchelle Drulis (D) Roy Freiman (D)	Clinton Town, Clinton Township, Flemington, High Bridge, Lebanon Borough, Raritan Township, and Readington Township. The remainder of this district covers portions of Mercer County, Middlesex County and Somerset County.
23rd	Doug Steinhardt (R)	John DiMaio (R) Erik Peterson (R)	Alexandria Township, Bethlehem Township, Bloomsbury, Califon, Franklin Township, Glen Gardner, Hampton Borough, Holland Township, Lebanon Township, Milford Borough, Tewksbury, and Union Township. The remainder of this district covers portions of Somerset County and Warren County.

=== Law enforcement ===
The Hunterdon County Sheriff's Office includes about 43 sworn officers. The current sheriff is Frederick Brown, who was reelected to a second three-year term in 2013. He was preceded by Republican Deborah Trout who served one term starting in November 2007.

On December 22, 2008, state investigators seized computers and other records related to Sheriff Deborah Trout's hiring of undersheriffs and other personnel without the usual background checks and qualifications. In 2010, a grand jury indicted then-sheriff Deborah Trout and two under-sheriffs on 43 counts of official misconduct and other charges. The indictment was later suppressed when new state officials were appointed by incoming Governor Chris Christie. The propriety of the investigation, the indictment and its aftermath are the subject of a number of legal actions.

== Politics ==
United States presidential election results for Hunterdon County, New Jersey
Year	Republican		Democratic		Third party(ies)	
Year	No.	%	No.	%	No.	%
1896	4,264	44.20%	4,992	51.75%	390	4.04%
1900	3,873	41.29%	5,137	54.76%	371	3.95%
1904	3,856	44.55%	4,360	50.38%	439	5.07%
1908	3,733	43.05%	4,736	54.61%	203	2.34%
1912	1,970	25.62%	4,103	53.37%	1,615	21.01%
1916	3,408	42.69%	4,462	55.89%	114	1.43%
1920	7,443	54.38%	6,067	44.33%	176	1.29%
1924	8,940	60.62%	5,103	34.60%	704	4.77%
1928	11,820	73.53%	4,225	26.28%	31	0.19%
1932	8,476	51.92%	7,531	46.13%	319	1.95%
1936	8,832	47.98%	9,526	51.75%	51	0.28%
1940	10,284	56.50%	7,872	43.25%	47	0.26%
1944	9,843	59.11%	6,774	40.68%	35	0.21%
1948	10,654	60.85%	6,515	37.21%	340	1.94%
1952	14,439	67.47%	6,878	32.14%	83	0.39%
1956	16,150	72.77%	5,957	26.84%	86	0.39%
1960	15,842	64.06%	8,863	35.84%	26	0.11%
1964	10,173	40.24%	15,091	59.69%	19	0.08%
1968	15,851	57.77%	8,755	31.91%	2,833	10.32%
1972	21,282	68.97%	9,031	29.27%	543	1.76%
1976	19,616	59.50%	12,592	38.20%	758	2.30%
1980	21,403	58.75%	10,029	27.53%	4,998	13.72%
1984	29,737	72.39%	10,972	26.71%	370	0.90%
1988	31,907	69.09%	13,758	29.79%	517	1.12%
1992	25,130	46.56%	15,423	28.57%	13,421	24.87%
1996	26,379	51.00%	18,446	35.66%	6,902	13.34%
2000	32,210	57.05%	21,387	37.88%	2,858	5.06%
2004	39,888	59.82%	26,050	39.07%	742	1.11%
2008	39,092	55.83%	29,776	42.53%	1,147	1.64%
2012	38,687	58.07%	26,876	40.34%	1,061	1.59%
2016	38,712	54.02%	28,898	40.33%	4,050	5.65%
2020	43,153	51.23%	39,457	46.84%	1,632	1.94%
2024	42,391	52.38%	36,995	45.72%	1,539	1.90%

Hunterdon County is considered a Republican stronghold and has traditionally elected some of the most conservative members of the New Jersey legislature. All five county commissioners are Republicans, as are all countywide elected officers and the majority of township committee and borough council members. The county has only gone Democratic in a presidential election twice since 1920, in the national Democratic landslides of 1936 and 1964.

However, in 2016, the margin of victory for Republican presidential candidates decreased from 17.8 percent in 2012 to 13.7 percent, despite the Democrats' national popular vote margin shrinking from 3.9 points to 2.1 points. In 2020, Joe Biden came closer than any Democratic nominee to carrying the county since Lyndon B. Johnson’s win in 1964, losing by 4.4 percent to Donald Trump.

In 2024, despite winning New Jersey by only 6%, Democratic nominee Kamala Harris became the second Democratic nominee to win over 45% of the vote in the county since 1964. The county had the smallest swing to the right of any county in New Jersey from 2020 to 2024, swinging right by 2%, compared to the state swinging right by 10%. In the 2025 New Jersey gubernatorial election, Democrat Mikie Sherrill won 47.4% of the vote in the county and lost it by just 4.6%, the closest a Democrat has come to winning the county in a gubernatorial election since 1977. In 2026, Senator Cory Booker won Hunterdon County by about 7 points, becoming the first Democrat to win Hunterdon County since Senator Bill Bradley's landslide reelection in 1984.

As of October 1, 2021, there were a total of 107,101 registered voters in Hunterdon County, of whom 29,256 (27.3%) were registered as Democrats, 41,836 (39.1%) were registered as Republicans and 35,077 (32.8%) were registered as unaffiliated. There were 932 voters (0.9%) registered to other parties.

Senate Class 1 election results

United States Senate election results for Hunterdon County, New Jersey1
Year	Republican		Democratic		Third party(ies)	
Year	No.	%	No.	%	No.	%
2024	40,273	52.24%	34,983	45.37%	1,843	2.39%
2018	36,116	57.21%	24,823	39.32%	2,195	3.48%
2012	36,000	57.33%	24,676	39.29%	2,123	3.38%
2006	25,531	57.73%	16,873	38.15%	1,823	4.12%
2000	34,468	63.41%	17,796	32.74%	2,091	3.85%
1994	22,179	63.44%	11,792	33.73%	989	2.83%
1988	25,615	57.64%	18,281	41.14%	544	1.22%
1982	16,896	65.38%	8,340	32.27%	605	2.34%

Senate Class 2 election results

United States Senate election results for Hunterdon County, New Jersey2
Year	Republican		Democratic		Third party(ies)	
Year	No.	%	No.	%	No.	%
2020	43,951	53.13%	36,728	44.40%	2,041	2.47%
2014	21,709	58.97%	14,241	38.68%	864	2.35%
2013	17,593	61.26%	10,781	37.54%	345	1.20%
2008	40,309	61.63%	22,824	34.89%	2,276	3.48%
2002	25,124	62.53%	13,890	34.57%	1,163	2.89%
1996	31,002	62.27%	15,538	31.21%	3,247	6.52%
1990	18,309	60.94%	10,849	36.11%	886	2.95%
1984	17,839	45.38%	20,864	53.07%	611	1.55%

=== State elections ===
Governor election results

Gubernatorial election results for Hunterdon County, New Jersey
Year	Republican		Democratic		Third party(ies)	
Year	No.	%	No.	%	No.	%
2025	34,683	51.96%	31,663	47.44%	401	0.60%
2021	33,459	58.92%	22,820	40.19%	505	0.89%
2017	26,708	58.89%	17,697	39.02%	945	2.08%
2013	31,292	73.53%	10,425	24.50%	842	1.98%
2009	33,360	65.75%	12,893	25.41%	4,485	8.84%
2005	27,521	61.56%	15,004	33.56%	2,179	4.87%
2001	23,059	58.45%	13,911	35.26%	2,484	6.30%
1997	24,465	59.46%	10,983	26.69%	5,698	13.85%
1993	28,304	67.01%	12,909	30.56%	1,024	2.42%
1989	18,046	54.61%	14,164	42.86%	838	2.54%
1985	17,875	75.37%	5,388	22.72%	453	1.91%
1981	17,785	66.68%	8,330	31.23%	557	2.09%
1977	12,168	48.13%	12,608	49.87%	507	2.01%
1973	6,680	30.37%	15,058	68.46%	258	1.17%
1969	15,830	68.57%	7,047	30.52%	209	0.91%
1965	11,726	56.08%	8,996	43.02%	189	0.90%
1961	11,555	56.51%	8,725	42.67%	168	0.82%
1957	9,310	50.13%	9,208	49.58%	54	0.29%
1953	7,628	46.82%	8,513	52.26%	150	0.92%

== Municipalities ==
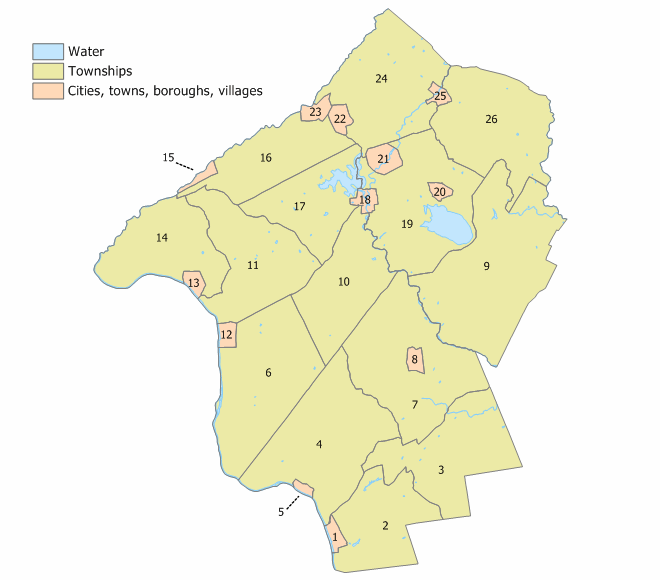
Index map of Hunterdon County municipalities (click to see index key)

Interactive map of municipalities in Hunterdon County

The following 26 municipalities are located in Hunterdon County (with 2010 Census data for population, housing units and area):

Municipality (with map key)		Municipal type	Population	Housing Units	Total Area	Water Area	Land Area	Pop. Density	Housing Density	School District	Communities
Alexandria	11	township	4,809	1,865	27.64	0.22	27.42	180.1	68.0	Delaware Valley (9-12); Alexandria Township (PK-8)	Everittstown; Little York; Mechlings Corner; Mount Pleasant; Mount Salem Pittstown (part); Swinesburg
Bethlehem Township	16	township	3,745	1,386	20.83	0.12	20.71	192.1	66.9	North Hunterdon-Voorhees (9-12); Bethlehem Township (PK-8)	Charlestown; Polktown; Swinesburg; West Portal
Bloomsbury	15	borough	792	358	0.91	0.03	0.88	991.9	408.1	Phillipsburg (9-12) (S/R); Bloomsbury (PK-8)	
Califon	25	borough	1,005	419	0.97	0.02	0.95	1,133.3	441.3	North Hunterdon-Voorhees (9-12); Califon (PK-8)	Lower Valley
Clinton Town	18	town	2,773	1,098	1.42	0.08	1.34	2,032.6	820.8	North Hunterdon-Voorhees (9-12); Clinton-Glen Gardner (PK-8)	
Clinton Township	19	township	13,505	4,737	33.82	3.95	29.88	451.1	158.6	North Hunterdon-Voorhees (9-12); Clinton Township (PK-8)	Annandale CDP (1,663); Cedar Heights; Cokesbury; Hamden; Mariannes Corner; Potterstown; Readingsburg; Sunnyside
Delaware Township	4	township	4,560	1,927	37.02	0.39	36.64	124.5	52.6	Hunterdon Central (9-12); Delaware Township (PK-8)	Bowne; Brookville; Dilts Corner; Headquarters; Locktown; Prallsville; Raven Rock; Rosemont; Sand Brook; Sandy Ridge; Sergeantsville
East Amwell Township	3	township	3,917	1,580	28.56	0.10	28.46	141.0	55.5	Hunterdon Central (9-12); East Amwell Township (PK-8)	Amwell; Boss Road; Bowne; Buttonwood Corners; Cloverhill; Furmans Corner; Larisons Corners; Linvale; Reaville; Rileyville; Ringoes CDP (849); Rocktown; Snydertown; Unionville; Vanlieu Corners; Wertsville
Flemington	8	borough	4,876	1,926	1.08	0.00	1.08	4,252.2	1,787.8	Hunterdon Central (9-12); Flemington-Raritan (PK-8)	
Franklin Township	10	township	3,267	1,204	23.00	0.20	22.80	140.1	52.8	North Hunterdon-Voorhees (9-12); Franklin Township (PK-8)	Allens Corner; Alvater Corner; Cherryville; Grandin; Kingtown; Lansdowne; Littletown; Oak Grove; Pittstown (part); Quakertown; Sidney; Sunnyside
Frenchtown	12	borough	1,370	656	1.36	0.10	1.26	1,087.2	519.4	Delaware Valley (9-12); Frenchtown (PK-8)	
Glen Gardner	22	borough	1,682	825	1.52	0.00	1.52	1,117.8	541.2	North Hunterdon-Voorhees (9-12); Clinton-Glen Gardner (PK-8)	Bells Crossing; Clarksville
Hampton	23	borough	1,438	612	1.54	0.01	1.53	915.1	399.7	North Hunterdon-Voorhees (9-12); Lebanon Township (6-8) (S/R) Hampton (PK-5)|| Hampton Junction	
High Bridge	21	borough	3,546	1,481	2.43	0.04	2.39	1,526.9	619.9	North Hunterdon-Voorhees (9-12); High Bridge (PK-8)	Pierce Heights
Holland Township	14	township	5,177	2,066	24.02	0.51	23.51	225.0	87.9	Delaware Valley (9-12); Holland Township (PK-8)	Amsterdam; Hughesville; Little York; Mount Joy; Riegel Ridge; Spring Mills
Kingwood	6	township	3,802	1,569	35.77	0.62	35.16	109.4	44.6	Delaware Valley (9-12); Kingwood Township (PK-8)	Baptistown; Barbertown; Byram; Idell; Milltown; Point Breeze; Tumble Falls
Lambertville	1	city	4,139	2,079	1.30	0.14	1.15	3,386.1	1,798.8	South Hunterdon	
Lebanon Borough	20	borough	1,665	664	0.89	0.00	0.89	1,532.0	749.1	North Hunterdon-Voorhees (9-12) Clinton Township (7-8) (S/R); Lebanon Borough (PK-6)||	
Lebanon Township	24	township	6,195	2,439	31.70	0.24	31.46	209.4	77.5	North Hunterdon-Voorhees (9-12); Lebanon Township (PK-8)	Anthony; Bunnvale; Hampton Junction; Hoffmans; Little Brook; Lower Valley; Mount Lebanon; New Hampton; Newport; Penwell; Red Mill; Scrappy Corner; Spruce Run; Woodglen
Milford	13	borough	1,232	552	1.23	0.08	1.15	1,073.4	480.5	Delaware Valley (9-12); Milford Borough (PK-8)	
Raritan Township	7	township	23,447	8,284	37.69	0.16	37.53	591.2	220.9	Hunterdon Central (9-12); Flemington-Raritan (PK-8)	Bartles Corners; Cloverhill; Copper Hill; Croton; Flemington Junction; Gary Corner; Klinesville; Larisons Corners; Muirhead; Reaville; Rockefellows Mills; Thachers Hill; Voorhees Corner
Readington Township	9	township	16,128	6,191	48.04	0.30	47.74	337.8	129.7	Hunterdon Central (9-12); Readington Township (PK-8)	Barley Sheaf; Centerville; Cushetunk; Darts Mills; Dreahook; Holcomb Mills; McCrea Mills; Mechanicsville; Neshanic Station CDP (part; 5,224); Pleasant Run; Potterstown; Readington Village; Riverside; Rowland's Mills; Stanton; Three Bridges CDP (321); Whitehouse; Whitehouse Station CDP (3,152)
Stockton	5	borough	495	259	0.61	0.08	0.54	1,005.6	484.1	South Hunterdon	
Tewksbury	26	township	5,870	2,323	31.70	0.17	31.53	190.1	73.7	North Hunterdon-Voorhees (9-12); Tewksbury Township (PK-8)	Bissell; Cokesbury; Fairmount; Farmersville; Laurel Farms; Lower Fairmount; Mountainville; Oldwick CDP (445); Pottersville CDP (467); Sutton; Vernoy
Union Township	17	township	6,507	1,830	20.61	1.87	18.74	315.3	97.7	North Hunterdon-Voorhees (9-12); Union Township (PK-8)	Coles Mills; Grandin; Hensfoot; Jutland; Kingtown; Mechlings Corner; Mount Salem; Norton; Pattenburg; Perryville; Pittstown (part); Polktown; Van Syckel
West Amwell Township	2	township	3,005	1,157	21.78	0.19	21.58	177.9	53.6	South Hunterdon	Alexauken; Bowne; Linvale; Mount Airy; Rocktown
Hunterdon County		county	128,947	49,487	437.44	9.62	427.82	300.0	115.7		

== Notable people ==
=== Public Service ===
- John T. Bird (1829-1911), U.S. House of Representatives (1869-1873).
- James Buchanan (1839-1900), U.S. House of Representatives (1885-1893).
- Bradley M. Campbell (born 1961), commissioner, New Jersey Department of Environmental Protection (2002-2006)
- Alvah A. Clark (1840-1912), U.S. House of Representatives (1877-1881).
- Johnston Cornish (1858-1920), U.S. House of Representatives (1893-1895).
- Thomas W. Greelish (1939-1991), United States Attorney for the District of New Jersey (1985-1987).
- George Holcombe (1786–1828), member of the United States House of Representatives from New Jersey's at-large congressional district
- William Kirkpatrick (1769–1832), United States Congressman
- Leonard Lance (born 1952), United States Congressman
- Andrew Maguire (born 1939), U.S. House of Representatives (1975-1981).
- Tom Malinowski (born 1965), U.S. House of Representatives (2019–2023).
- David S. Manners (1808-1884), 9th Mayor of Jersey City, New Jersey (1852-1857).
- Mallory McMorrow (born 1986), Member of the Michigan Senate (2019–Present).
- Daniel Morgan (1736-1802), Revolutionary War general, U.S. House of Representatives (1797-1799).
- George Opdyke (1805-1880), Mayor of New York City 1862-1864
- James Parker (1776-1868), U.S. House of Representatives (1833-1837), Mayor of Perth Amboy, New Jersey (1815-1816, 1850-1851).
- James N. Pidcock (1836-1899), New Jersey General Assembly, U.S. House of Representatives (1885-1889).
- Horace Griggs Prall (1881-1951), Member of the New Jersey Senate, Acting Governor of New Jersey.
- Collin McKinney, Texas independence leader
- Donna Simon (born 1960), New Jersey General Assembly (2012-2016).
- Bennet Van Syckel (1830-1921), Associate Justice of the New Jersey Supreme Court (1869-1904).
- Christine Todd Whitman (born 1946), 50th Governor of New Jersey

=== Businesspeople ===
- Robert Greifeld (born 1957), former CEO and chairman of Nasdaq, Inc.
- Gary Vaynerchuk (born 1975), entrepreneur and internet personality

=== Actors ===
- John Amos (1939-2024)
- Emma Bell (born 1986)
- Anne Elstner (1899–1981)
- James Gandolfini (1961-2013)
- Taissa Farmiga (born 1994)
- Vera Farmiga (born 1973)
- Alison Haislip (born 1981)
- Charlie Murphy (1959-2017)
- Peter Ostrum (born 1957)
- Joe Piscopo (born 1951)
- Alex Shaffer (born 1993)
- Dorothy Stickney (1896-1998)
- Jessica Vosk (born 1983)

=== Musicians ===
- Aruna (born 1975), electronic music vocalist
- Scott Bradlee (born 1981), creator of Postmodern Jukebox
- Danny Federici (1950–2008), organ and keyboard player for the E Street Band
- Kyp Malone (born 1973), multi-instrumentalist, member of the band TV on the Radio
- Sharon Van Etten (born 1981), singer-songwriter
- Frederica Von Stade (born 1945), opera singer
- James Valenti (born 1977), operatic tenor
- Gene Ween (born 1970), founding member of Ween
- George David Weiss (1921-2010), songwriter and arranger

=== Athletics ===
- Brad Benson (born 1955), offensive lineman who played for the New York Giants
- Jason Cabinda (born 1996), linebacker for the Detroit Lions
- Jack Cust (born 1979), professional baseball designated hitter and outfielder
- Garrett LeRose (born 1985), head coach, Washington and Lee Generals football team
- Jayson Williams (born 1968), former NBA player

== Education ==
=== School districts ===
School districts include:

K-12

- South Hunterdon Regional School District

Secondary

- Delaware Valley Regional High School
- Hunterdon Central Regional High School
- Hunterdon County Vocational School District
- North Hunterdon-Voorhees Regional High School District

Elementary (K-8, except as noted)

- Alexandria Township School District
- Bethlehem Township School District
- Bloomsbury School District
- Califon School District
- Clinton-Glen Gardner School District (renamed from Clinton Public School as of 2009)
- Clinton Township School District
- Delaware Township School District
- East Amwell Township School District
- Flemington-Raritan Regional School District
- Franklin Township School District (Hunterdon County, New Jersey)
- Frenchtown School District
- Hampton School District
- High Bridge School District
- Holland Township School District
- Kingwood Township School District
- Lebanon Borough School District K–6
- Lebanon Township Schools
- Milford Borough School District
- Readington Township Public Schools
- Tewksbury Township Schools
- Union Township School District

=== High schools ===
A map of Hunterdon County high school sending districts; click for a key

- Delaware Valley Regional High School, in Alexandria Township, serves the townships of Alexandria, Holland and Kingwood and the boroughs of Frenchtown and Milford.
- Hunterdon Central Regional High School, located in Raritan Township, serves students from Delaware Township, East Amwell Township, Flemington Borough, Raritan Township and Readington Township.
- North Hunterdon High School, located in Clinton Township, hosts the students of Bethlehem Township, Clinton Town, Clinton Township, Franklin Township, Lebanon Borough and Union Township.
- Phillipsburg High School, located in Phillipsburg in neighboring Warren County, educates the students of Bloomsbury, though a proposal is currently on the table to send the borough's students to Delaware Valley Regional High school instead.
- South Hunterdon Regional High School, located in West Amwell Township, serves students from Lambertville, Stockton and West Amwell Township.
- Voorhees High School, in Lebanon Township, serves the students of Califon Borough, Glen Gardner Borough, Hampton Borough, High Bridge Borough, Lebanon Township, Tewksbury Township.

=== Higher education ===
- Raritan Valley Community College is the two-year community college for both Hunterdon and Somerset County, one of a network of 19 county colleges statewide. Founded in 1965, the school's main campus is located in North Branch, in Somerset County.
- Rutgers University has a partnership with Raritan Valley Community College which offers bachelor's degree completion programs at the North Branch campus.

== Points of interest ==
Hunterdon County is considered the premier place to hunt white tailed deer in New Jersey. More deer are harvested each year than any other county according to New Jersey Fish and Game records. The premier fishing streams are the Musconetcong in the north and the Lamington River. The NJ Fish and Game stocks thousands of rainbow, brown, and brook trout in these streams as well as other streams such as the South Branch of the Raritan River.

Round Valley Reservoir and Spruce Run Reservoir are manmade reservoirs that provide boating and fishing opportunities for patrons. Covering 2,000 acres (810 ha) and the state's largest reservoir with 55,000,000,000 US gallons (2.1×10^{11} L; 4.6×10^{10} imp gal) of water, Round Valley is one of New Jersey's trophy trout lakes, and holds the state records for smallmouth bass, brown trout, lake trout, and American eel. Spruce Run, the state's third-largest reservoir, held the state record for Northern Pike for nearly 30 years, and offers a large variety of species for anglers to pursue. New Jersey Fish and Game has nine Wildlife Management Areas for hunting ducks, deer, pheasants, quail, rabbits, squirrels and bears.

The Hunterdon County Department of Parks and Recreation manages these parks.

- Point Mountain Section
- Mountain Farm/Teetertown Preserve
- Tower Hill Park
- Charlestown Reserve
- Union Furnace Nature Preserve
- Columbia Trail Section
- Cold Brook Reserve
- Musconetcong Gorge Section
- Schick Reserve
- Hoffman Park
- South Branch Reservation
- Landsdown Trail Section
- Cushetunk Mountain Nature Preserve
- Arboretum
- Deer Path Park and Round Mountain Section
- Uplands Reserve
- Clover Hill Park
- Heron Glen Golf Course
- Wescott Nature Preserve
- South County Park
- Future Park
- Laport Reserve
- Sourland Mountain Nature Preserve
- Jugtown Mountain Nature Preserve
- Finn Road Park
- Beneduce Vineyards
- Hunterdon County Arboretum
- Hunterdon Art Museum
- Hunterdon County Courthouse
- Hunterdon Medical Center
- Mount Salem Vineyards
- Old York Cellars
- The Red Mill (in Clinton, New Jersey)
- Solitude Dam/TISCO Headquarters 1742 in High Bridge, New Jersey
- The Solitude House Museum in High Bridge, New Jersey
- The Taylor Steelworkers Historic Greenway in High Bridge, New Jersey
- Unionville Vineyards

== See also ==
- 2024 New Jersey drone sightings
- The Hunterdon County Democrat
- National Register of Historic Places listings in Hunterdon County, New Jersey
- USS Hunterdon County (LST-838)
- Musconetcong County, New Jersey, a proposed county in the 19th Century from parts of Hunterdon and Warren counties
