= Delaware Township School District =

School district in Hunterdon County, New Jersey, US

Address
- 501 Rosemont-Ringoes Road Sergeantsville, Hunterdon County, New Jersey, 08557; United States
- Coordinates: 41.99575°N 87.86216°W

District information
- Grades: PreK-8"
- Superintendent: Scott Lipson
- Business administrator: Susan Joyce
- Schools: 1

Students and staff
- Enrollment: 405 (as of 2024–25)
- Faculty: 45.4 FTEs
- Student–teacher ratio: 8.9:1

Other information
- District Factor Group: GH
- Website: www.dtsk8.org
Ind.	Per pupil	District spending	Rank (*)	K-8 average	%± vs. average
1A	Total Spending	$22,924	61	$18,891	21.3%
1	Budgetary Cost	18,957	63	14,159	33.9%
2	Classroom Instruction	11,699	63	8,659	35.1%
6	Support Services	3,120	58	2,167	44.0%
8	Administrative Cost	1,842	53	1,547	19.1%
10	Operations & Maintenance	1,855	51	1,612	15.1%
13	Extracurricular Activities	328	63	104	215.4%
16	Median Teacher Salary	65,653	44	61,136
Data from NJDoE 2014 Taxpayers' Guide to Education Spending. *Of K-8 districts with 401-750 students. Lowest spending=1; Highest=64

The Delaware Township School District is a community public school district that serves students in pre-kindergarten through eighth grade from Delaware Township, in Hunterdon County, in the U.S. state of New Jersey.

As of the 2024–25 school year, the district, comprised of one school, had an enrollment of 405 students and 45.4 classroom teachers (on an FTE basis), for a student–teacher ratio of 8.9:1.

The district participates in the Interdistrict Public School Choice Program, which allows non-resident students to attend the district's school without cost to their parents, with tuition covered by the State of New Jersey. Available slots are announced annually by grade.

The district had been classified by the New Jersey Department of Education as being in District Factor Group "GH", the third-highest of eight groupings. District Factor Groups organize districts statewide to allow comparison by common socioeconomic characteristics of the local districts. From lowest socioeconomic status to highest, the categories are A, B, CD, DE, FG, GH, I and J.

Students in ninth through twelfth grades attend Hunterdon Central High School, part of the Hunterdon Central Regional High School District, which serves students in central Hunterdon County from Delaware Township, East Amwell Township, Flemington Borough, Raritan Township and Readington Township. As of the 2024–25 school year, the high school had an enrollment of 2,238 students and 217.2 classroom teachers (on an FTE basis), for a student–teacher ratio of 10.3:1.

== Schools ==
Delaware Township School served 403 students in grades PreK-8 as of the 2024–25 school year. The school is located on a 26-acre (11 ha) site adjacent to the community of Sergeantsville and 3 miles (4.8 km) from the Delaware River.

- Scott Lipson, principal

== Administration ==
Core members of the district's administration are:

- Scott Lipson, superintendent
- Susan Joyce, business administrator

== Board of education ==
The district's board of education, comprised of nine members, sets policy and oversees the fiscal and educational operation of the district through its administration. As a Type II school district, the board's trustees are elected directly by voters to serve three-year terms of office on a staggered basis, with three seats up for election each year held (since 2012) as part of the November general election. The board appoints a superintendent to oversee the district's day-to-day operations and a business administrator to supervise the business functions of the district.<ref99>Board of Education, Delaware Township School District. Accessed September 18, 2026.</ref>
