= Vanlieu Corners, New Jersey =

Populated place in Hunterdon County, New Jersey, US

- Unincorporated community
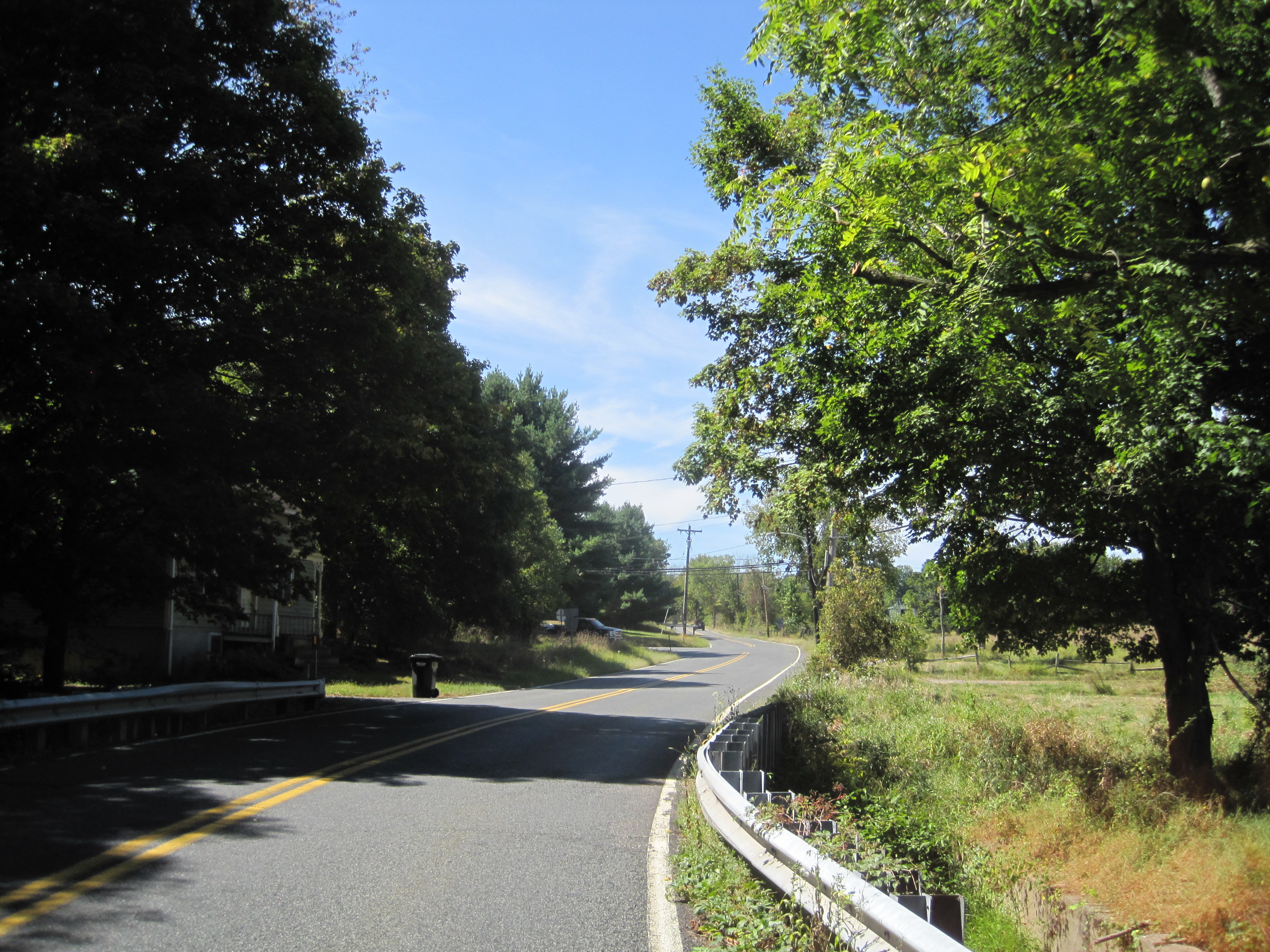

- Location of Vanlieu Corners in Hunterdon County; inset: location of county within the state of New Jersey Vanlieu Corners, New Jersey (New Jersey) Vanlieu Corners, New Jersey (the United States)
- Coordinates: 40°26′39″N 74°48′22″W
- Country: United States
- State: New Jersey
- County: Hunterdon
- Township: East Amwell
- Elevation: 187 ft (57 m)
- Time zone: UTC−05:00 (Eastern (EST))
  - Summer (DST): UTC−04:00 (EDT)
- GNIS feature ID: 881433

Vanlieu Corners (also Van Liew's Corners or Vanlieus Corner) is an unincorporated community in East Amwell Township in Hunterdon County, in the U.S. state of New Jersey.

In 1881, the settlement consisted of a small cluster of residences, surrounding the Chamberlin & Van Liew store. Vanlieu Corners was in the same school district as Wertsville. Today, the area is at the corner of Wertsville Road (County Route 602) and Rileyville Road (CR 607) and consists of mostly farmland on the north slope of the Sourland Mountain.

A map of Hunterdon County from 1851 identifies the community as Vanlieus Corner and indicates a few structures west of the intersection. The Vanlieus Store was located on the north side of Wertsville Road just west of Rileyville Road and the Vanlieus Hotel was located in the south west corner of the intersection. J Hagaman owned a wheel right shop on the east side of Rileyville Road just south of Wertsville Road.

A few structures survive today from the historic community. The house at 280 Wertsville Road is one of the oldest, constructed circa 1750. This is roughly where the Hagaman Wheel Right shop is indicated on the 1851 county map. 254 and 260 Wertsville Road were both built in circa 1800. It is unclear if these are the houses seen on the 1851 county map belonging to H Stout and E Sheperd respectively. Finally 251 and 281 Wertsville Road do not have construction dates listed, but their stone foundations indicate these houses are also historic to the 1800s at least.
