= Kingwood Township School District =

School district in Hunterdon County, New Jersey, US

Address
- 880 County Road 519 Kingwood Township, Hunterdon County, New Jersey, 08825; United States
- Coordinates: 40.505307°N 75.013643°W

District information
- Grades: PreK-8
- Superintendent: Rick Falkenstein
- Business administrator: Bobbie Beriont
- Schools: 1

Students and staff
- Enrollment: 324 (as of 2022–23)
- Faculty: 36.2 FTEs
- Student–teacher ratio: 9.0:1

Other information
- District Factor Group: FG
- Website: www.kingwoodschool.org
Ind.	Per pupil	District spending	Rank (*)	K-8 average	%± vs. average
1A	Total Spending	$17,908	32	$18,891	−5.2%
1	Budgetary Cost	15,433	39	14,159	9.0%
2	Classroom Instruction	9,449	41	8,659	9.1%
6	Support Services	2,258	29	2,167	4.2%
8	Administrative Cost	1,847	59	1,547	19.4%
10	Operations & Maintenance	1,699	32	1,612	5.4%
13	Extracurricular Activities	166	40	104	59.6%
16	Median Teacher Salary	56,410	26	61,136
Data from NJDoE 2014 Taxpayers' Guide to Education Spending. *Of K-8 districts with up to 400 students. Lowest spending=1; Highest=71

The Kingwood Township School District is a community public school district that serves students ranging from pre-kindergarten through eighth grade from Kingwood Township, in Hunterdon County, in the U.S. state of New Jersey.

As of the 2022–23 school year, the district, comprised of one school, had an enrollment of 324 students and 36.2 classroom teachers (on an FTE basis), for a student–teacher ratio of 9.0:1.

The district participates in the Interdistrict Public School Choice Program, which allows non-resident students to attend school in the district at no cost to their parents, with tuition covered by the resident district. Available slots are announced annually by grade.

The district had been classified by the New Jersey Department of Education as being in District Factor Group "FG", the fourth-highest of eight groupings. District Factor Groups organize districts statewide to allow comparison by common socioeconomic characteristics of the local districts. From lowest socioeconomic status to highest, the categories are A, B, CD, DE, FG, GH, I and J.

Students in public school for ninth through twelfth grades attend Delaware Valley Regional High School, together with students from Alexandria Township, Frenchtown, Holland Township and Milford borough. As of the 2022–23 school year, the high school had an enrollment of 722 students and 59.9 classroom teachers (on an FTE basis), for a student–teacher ratio of 12.1:1.

== School ==
Kingwood Township School had an enrollment of 325 students in grades PreK-8 as of the 2022–23 school year.

- Chris Keri, principal

== Administration ==
Core members of the district's administration are:

- Rick Falkenstein, chief school administrator
- Michele McCann, business administrator and board secretary

== Board of education ==
The district's board of education, comprised of nine members, sets policy and oversees the fiscal and educational operation of the district through its administration. As a Type II school district, the board's trustees are elected directly by voters to serve three-year terms of office on a staggered basis, with three seats up for election each year held (since 2012) as part of the November general election. The board appoints a superintendent to oversee the district's day-to-day operations and a business administrator to supervise the business functions of the district.
