= Readington Township Public Schools =

School district in Hunterdon County, New Jersey, US

Address
- 52 Readington Road Whitehouse Station, Hunterdon County, New Jersey, 08889; United States
- Coordinates: 40.587616°N 74.75747°W

District information
- Grades: Pre-K to 8
- Superintendent: Jonathan Hart
- Business administrator: Jason Bohm
- Schools: 4

Students and staff
- Enrollment: 1,404 (as of 2023–24)
- Faculty: 167.2 FTEs
- Student–teacher ratio: 8.4:1

Other information
- District Factor Group: I
- Website: www.readington.k12.nj.us
Ind.	Per pupil	District spending	Rank (*)	K-8 average	%± vs. average
1A	Total Spending	$18,755	69	$18,891	−0.7%
1	Budgetary Cost	15,003	63	14,159	6.0%
2	Classroom Instruction	9,058	62	8,659	4.6%
6	Support Services	2,598	72	2,167	19.9%
8	Administrative Cost	1,591	49	1,547	2.8%
10	Operations & Maintenance	1,442	34	1,612	−10.5%
13	Extracurricular Activities	199	80	104	91.3%
16	Median Teacher Salary	61,040	42	61,136
Data from NJDoE 2014 Taxpayers' Guide to Education Spending. *Of K-8 districts with more than 750 students. Lowest spending=1; Highest=84

The Readington Township Public Schools is a community public school district that serves students in pre-kindergarten through eighth grade from Readington Township, in Hunterdon County, in the U.S. state of New Jersey.

As of the 2023–24 school year, the district, comprised of four schools, had an enrollment of 1,404 students and 167.2 classroom teachers (on an FTE basis), for a student–teacher ratio of 8.4:1.

The district had been classified by the New Jersey Department of Education as being in District Factor Group "I", the second-highest of eight groupings. District Factor Groups organize districts statewide to allow comparison by common socioeconomic characteristics of the local districts. From lowest socioeconomic status to highest, the categories are A, B, CD, DE, FG, GH, I and J.

Students in public school for ninth through twelfth grades attend the Hunterdon Central Regional High School, part of the Hunterdon Central Regional High School District, which also serves students in central Hunterdon County from Delaware Township, East Amwell Township, Flemington Borough and Raritan Township. As of the 2023–24 school year, the high school had an enrollment of 2,408 students and 226.7 classroom teachers (on an FTE basis), for a student–teacher ratio of 10.6:1. Seats on the high school district's nine-member board of education are allocated based on the population of the five constituent municipalities who participate in the school district, with two seats allocated to Readington Township, a decrease of one seat based on the results of the 2020 Census.

== Schools ==
Schools in the district (with 2023–24 enrollment data from the National Center for Education Statistics) are:

Elementary schools

- Three Bridges School with 294 students in grades PreK–3
  - Kristen Higgins, principal
- Whitehouse School with 312 students in grades K–3
  - Ann T. DeRosa, principal
- Holland Brook School with 302 students in grades 4–5
  - Jonathan Moss, principal

Middle school

- Readington Middle School with 486 students in grades 6–8
  - Timothy Charleston, principal

== Administration ==
Core members of the district's administration are:

- Jonathan Hart, superintendent
- Jason Bohm, business administrator and board secretary

== Board of education ==
The district's board of education, comprised of nine members, sets policy and oversees the fiscal and educational operation of the district through its administration. As a Type II school district, the board's trustees are elected directly by voters to serve three-year terms of office on a staggered basis, with three seats up for election each year held (since 2013) as part of the November general election. The board appoints a superintendent to oversee the district's day-to-day operations and a business administrator to supervise the business functions of the district.

Recently, the board passed policy 2535. This policy aimed at restricting books in school libraries in the district. The first book banned form Readington Library was “The Perks of Being a Wallflower”. Readington is the 10th district to ban books in NJ.
