= Alexandria Township School District =

School district in Hunterdon County, New Jersey, US

Address
- 557 County Road 513 Pittstown, Hunterdon County, New Jersey, 08867; United States
- Coordinates: 40.571181°N 75.013499°W

District information
- Grades: PreK to 8
- Superintendent: Kevin McPeek
- Business administrator: Michael McGarry
- Schools: 1

Students and staff
- Enrollment: 428 (as of 2023–24)
- Faculty: 47.0 FTEs
- Student–teacher ratio: 9.1:1

Other information
- District Factor Group: GH
- Website: www.alexandriaschools.org
Ind.	Per pupil	District spending	Rank (*)	K-8 average	%± vs. average
1A	Total Spending	$20,225	48	$18,891	7.1%
1	Budgetary Cost	16,737	52	14,159	18.2%
2	Classroom Instruction	9,572	47	8,659	10.5%
6	Support Services	3,451	61	2,167	59.3%
8	Administrative Cost	1,826	47	1,547	18.0%
10	Operations & Maintenance	1,695	42	1,612	5.1%
13	Extracurricular Activities	182	50	104	75.0%
16	Median Teacher Salary	66,132	48	61,136
Data from NJDoE 2014 Taxpayers' Guide to Education Spending. *Of K-8 districts with 401-750 students. Lowest spending=1; Highest=64

The Alexandria Township School District is a comprehensive community public school district serving students in pre-kindergarten through eighth grade from Alexandria Township, in Hunterdon County, in the U.S. state of New Jersey.

As of the 2023–24 school year, the district, comprised of one school, had an enrollment of 428 students and 47.0 classroom teachers (on an FTE basis), for a student–teacher ratio of 9.1:1.

The district participates in the Interdistrict Public School Choice Program, which allows non-resident students to attend the district's school without cost to their parents, with tuition covered by the State of New Jersey. Available slots are announced annually by grade.

Students in public school for ninth through twelfth grades attend Delaware Valley Regional High School, together with students from Frenchtown, Holland Township, Kingwood Township and Milford. The school is part of the Delaware Valley Regional High School District. As of the 2023–24 school year, the high school had an enrollment of 692 students and 61.5 classroom teachers (on an FTE basis), for a student–teacher ratio of 11.3:1.

== History ==
Alexandria Township School opened in September 2023, consolidating the operations of Lester D. Wilson School for grades PreK–3 and Alexandria Middle School for grades 4–8 into a single school.

The district had been classified by the New Jersey Department of Education as being in District Factor Group "GH", the third-highest of eight groupings. District Factor Groups organize districts statewide to allow comparison by common socioeconomic characteristics of the local districts. From lowest socioeconomic status to highest, the categories are A, B, CD, DE, FG, GH, I and J.

== School ==
Alexandria Township School served 423 students in PreK through eighth grade in the 2023–24 school year.

== Administration ==
Core members of the district's administration are:

- Kevin McPeek, superintendent of schools
- Michael McGarry, school business administrator and board secretary

== Board of education ==
The district's board of education is comprised of nine members. As a Type II school district, the board's trustees are elected directly by voters to serve three-year terms of office on a staggered basis, with three seats up for election each year held (since 2012) as part of the November general election. The board appoints a superintendent to oversee the district's day-to-day operations and a business administrator to supervise the business functions of the district.
