= Potterstown, New Jersey =

Populated place in Hunterdon County, New Jersey, US

- Unincorporated community
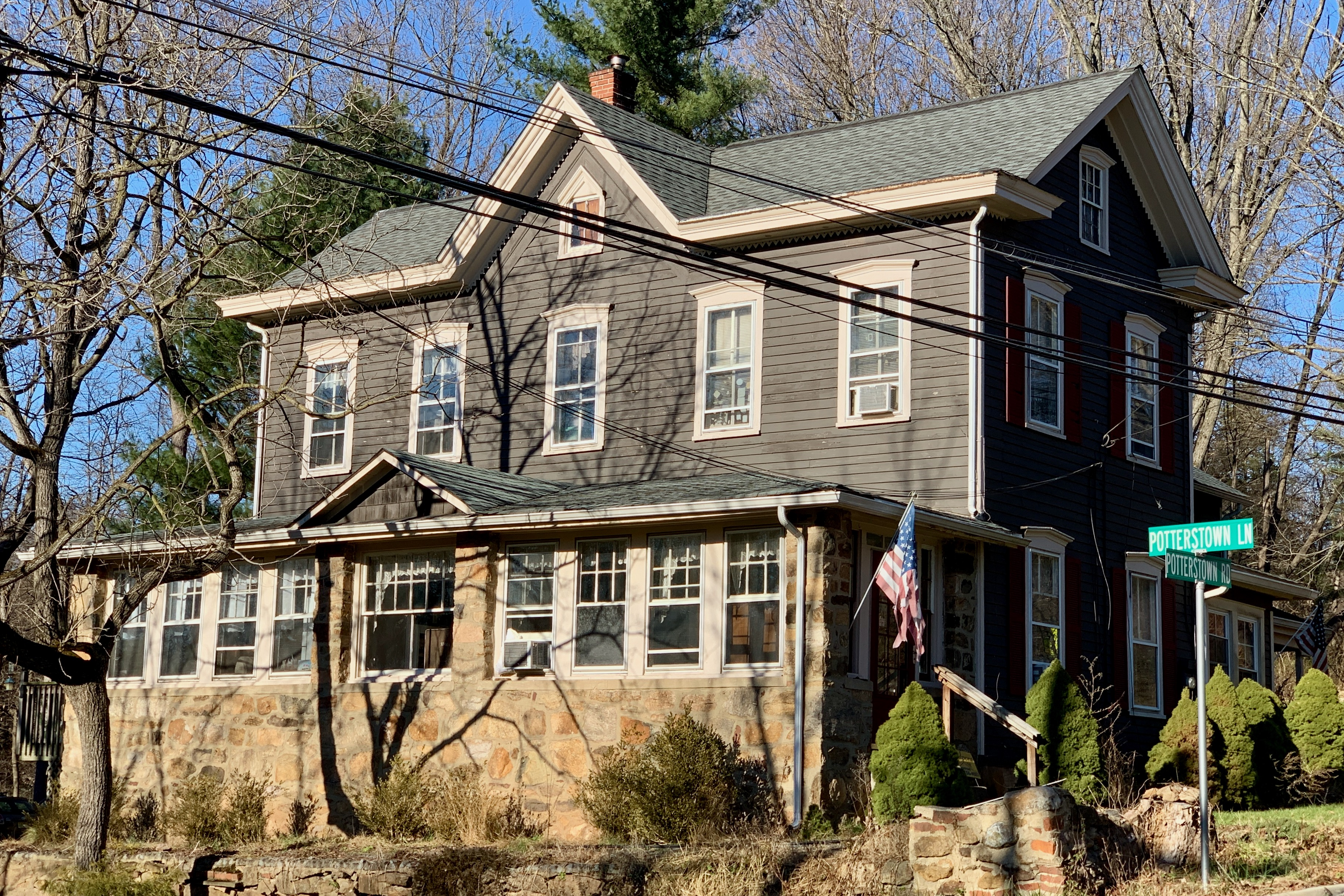
- Former hotel, listed on the National Register of Historic Places

- Location within Hunterdon County, New Jersey Location within New Jersey Location within the United States
- Coordinates: 40°38′32″N 74°47′55″W
- Country: United States
- State: New Jersey
- County: Hunterdon
- Township: Clinton and Readington
- Elevation: 259 ft (79 m)
- GNIS feature ID: 879464

Potterstown is an unincorporated community along the border of Clinton and Readington townships in Hunterdon County, New Jersey.

== History ==
Potterstown once was home to taverns, a blacksmith, a store house, a wheelwright and a pottery shop which gave the hamlet its name. In 1806, a stage coach route, known as the New Jersey Turnpike, running between Easton, Pennsylvania and New Brunswick, New Jersey, was built through the community. Aray Van Guinea, a free African-American, donated land for the construction of the German Lutheran Church. Robert Livingston, James Alexander, his son Lord Stirling and John Stevens all owned land here at some time. John Taylor, an officer with the Hunterdon 4th Militia built a house and mill, which was used during the Revolutionary War to provide soldiers with food. Taylor's Mill may become the fourth Readington Museum.

== Historic district ==
- Potterstown Rural Historic District
- U.S. National Register of Historic Places
- U.S. Historic district
- New Jersey Register of Historic Places
- Location: Along Potterstown and Halls Mill Roads and I-78
- Area: 453 acres (183 ha)
- Architectural style: Greek Revival, Colonial, Italianate, Victorian
- NRHP reference No.: 92000806
- NJRHP No.: 1621

Significant dates
- Added to NRHP: July 2, 1992
- Designated NJRHP: April 10, 1992

The Potterstown Rural Historic District is a 453-acre (183 ha) historic district that encompasses the community. It was added to the National Register of Historic Places on July 2, 1992 for its significance in architecture and community development. The district includes 26 contributing buildings, 8 contributing sites, and 4 contributing structures.

== Description ==
The former hotel at 11 Potterstown Road was built in the mid-19th century with Victorian style. The former Potterstown Store was also built in the mid-19th century. The Cold Brook School was built in 1828 and is a Readington Township Museum.

== Gallery ==
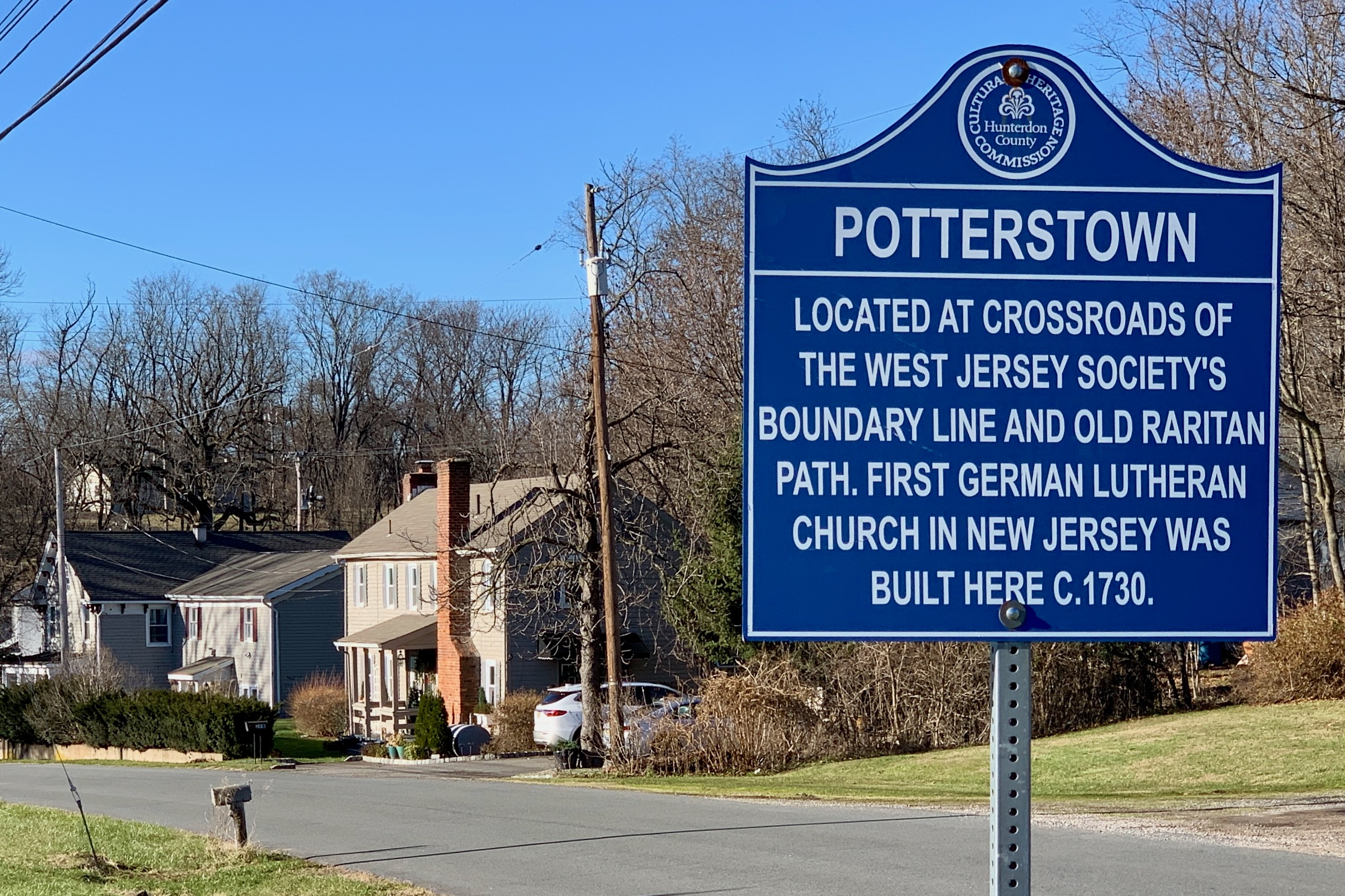
Entrance to Potterstown

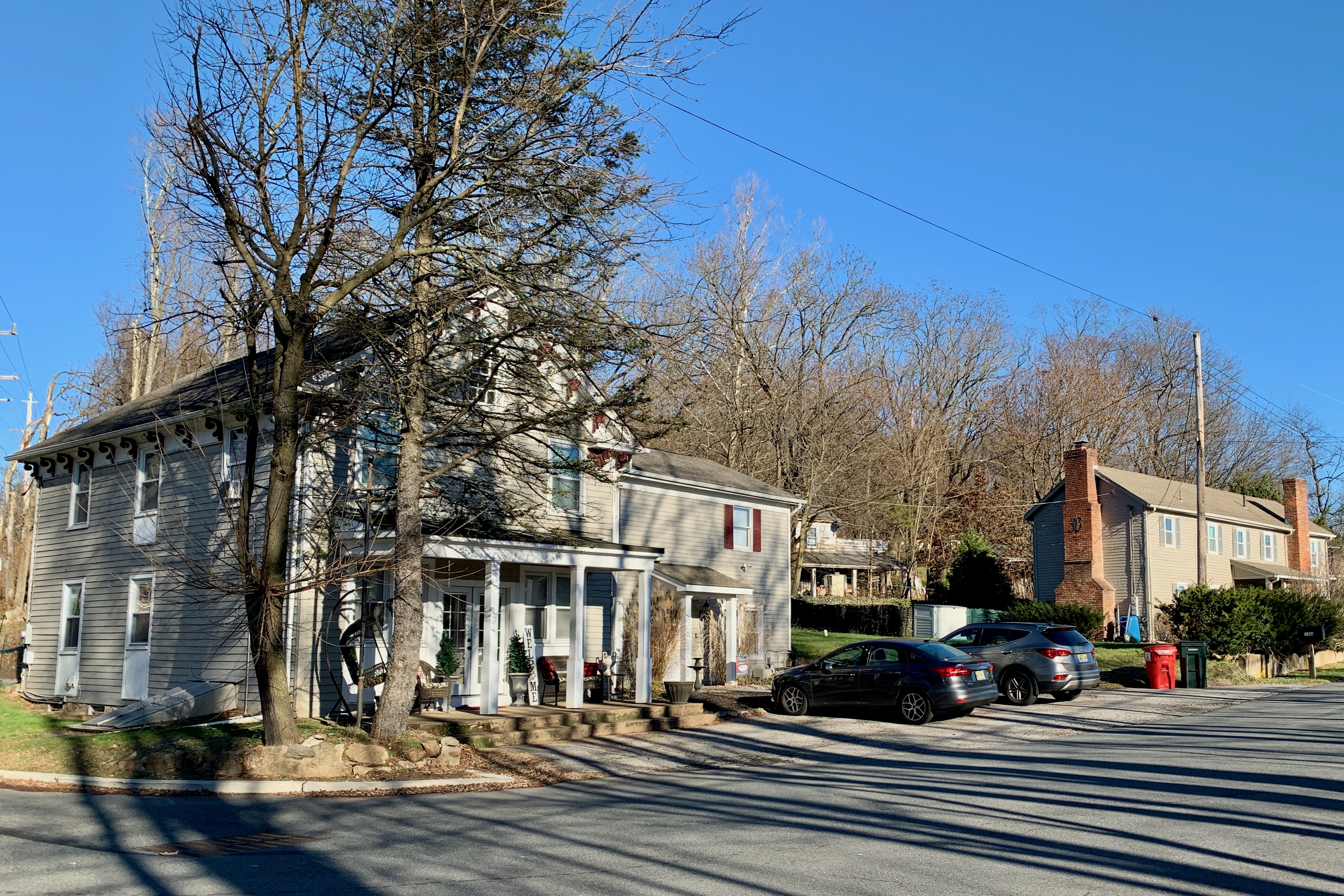
Former Potterstown Store

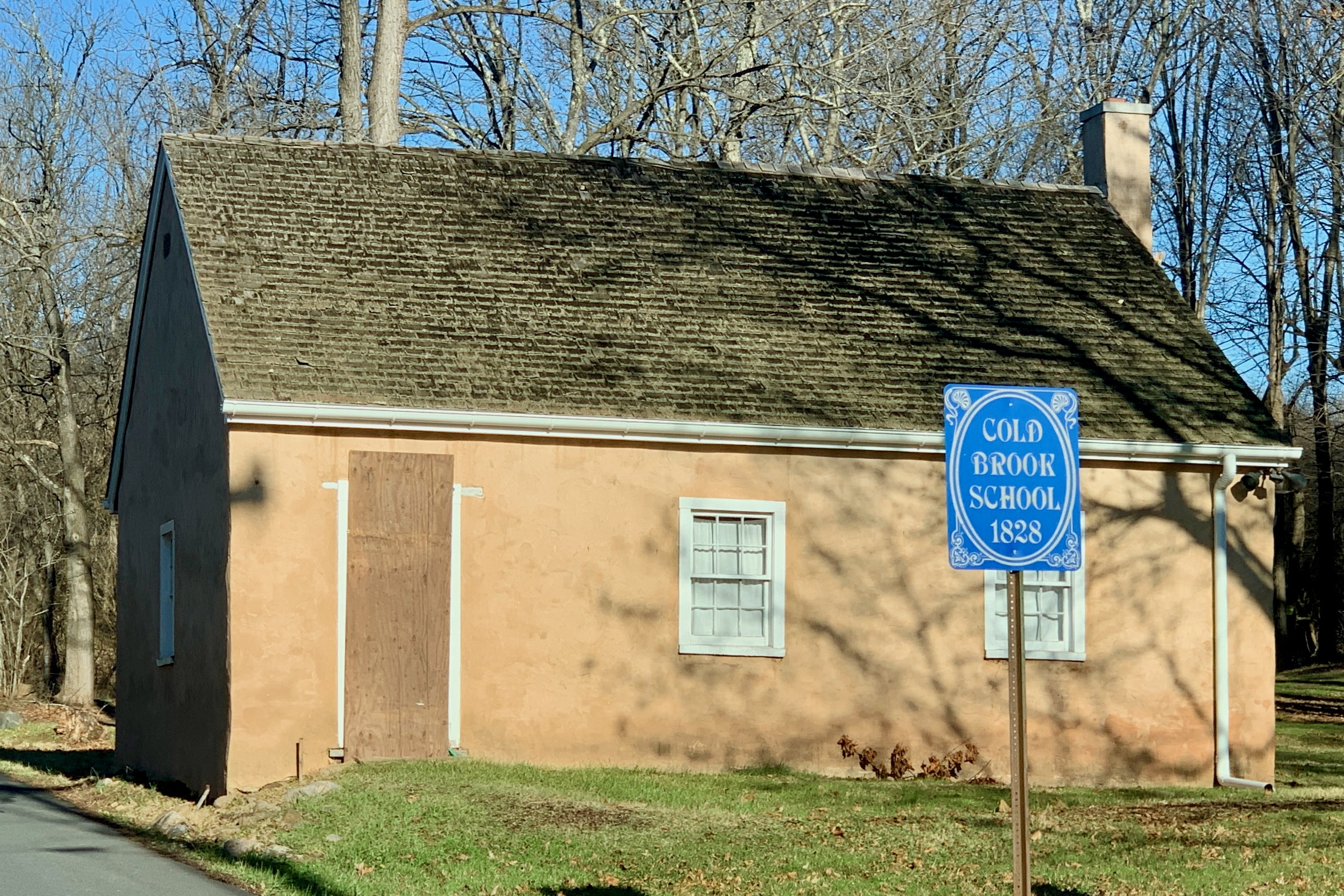
Cold Brook School

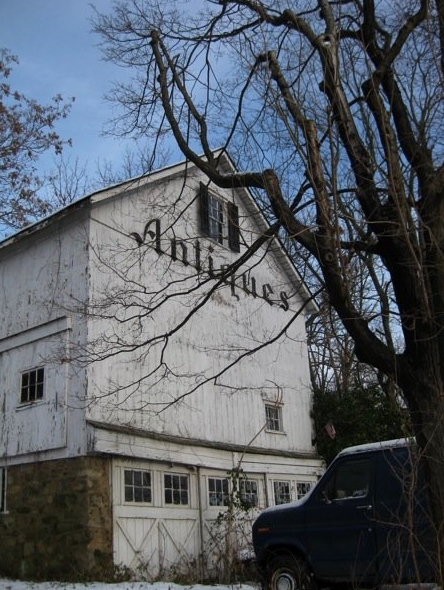
Former wheelwright shop

== See also ==
- Taylor's Mill Historic District
