= Clinton-Glen Gardner School District =

School district in Hunterdon County, New Jersey, US

Address
- 10 School Street Clinton, Hunterdon County, New Jersey, 08809; United States
- Coordinates: 40.635181°N 74.907655°W

District information
- Grades: PreK-8
- Superintendent: Seth Cohen
- Business administrator: Bernadette Wang
- Schools: 1

Students and staff
- Enrollment: 461 (as of 2023–24)
- Faculty: 45.3 FTEs
- Student–teacher ratio: 10.2:1

Other information
- District Factor Group: I
- Website: www.cpsnj.org
Ind.	Per pupil	District spending	Rank (*)	K-8 average	%± vs. average
1A	Total Spending	$18,909	40	$18,891	0.1%
1	Budgetary Cost	14,861	33	14,159	5.0%
2	Classroom Instruction	9,306	38	8,659	7.5%
6	Support Services	2,586	39	2,167	19.3%
8	Administrative Cost	1,605	35	1,547	3.7%
10	Operations & Maintenance	1,157	7	1,612	−28.2%
13	Extracurricular Activities	208	48	104	100.0%
16	Median Teacher Salary	60,695	48	61,136
Data from NJDoE 2014 Taxpayers' Guide to Education Spending. *Of K-8 districts with up to 400 students. Lowest spending=1; Highest=71

The Clinton-Glen Gardner School District is a community public school district that serves students in pre-kindergarten through eighth grade from the Town of Clinton and the Borough of Glen Gardner, in Hunterdon County, in the U.S. state of New Jersey. Before Glen Gardner, a non-operating district, was consolidated into the district, students from the borough had attended the district's school as part of a sending/receiving relationship. Other students attend the school on a tuition basis. Formerly known as the Town of Clinton School District, the district's board of education voted in November 2009 to revise the name to Clinton-Glen Gardner School District to reflect the merger.

As of the 2023–24 school year, the district, comprised of one school, had an enrollment of 461 students and 45.3 classroom teachers (on an FTE basis), for a student–teacher ratio of 10.2:1.

The district participates in the Interdistrict Public School Choice Program, which allows non-resident students to attend school in the district at no cost to their parents, with tuition covered by the resident district. Available slots are announced annually by grade.

The district had been classified by the New Jersey Department of Education as being in District Factor Group "I", the second-highest of eight groupings. District Factor Groups organize districts statewide to allow comparison by common socioeconomic characteristics of the local districts. From lowest socioeconomic status to highest, the categories are A, B, CD, DE, FG, GH, I, and J.

Public school students in ninth through twelfth grade attend either North Hunterdon High School in Annandale or Voorhees High School in Glen Gardner as part of the North Hunterdon-Voorhees Regional High School District. North Hunterdon High School serves students from Clinton Town, along with those from Clinton Township, Bethlehem Township, Franklin Township, Union Township, and Lebanon Borough. In contrast, students from Glen Gardner attend Voorhees High School, which also serves students from Califon, Hampton, High Bridge, Lebanon Township and Tewksbury Township. As of the 2023–24 school year, North Hunterdon High School had an enrollment of 1,262 students and 115.5 classroom teachers (on an FTE basis), for a student–teacher ratio of 10.9:1 and Voorhees High School had an enrollment of 753 students and 73.9 classroom teachers (on an FTE basis), for a student–teacher ratio of 10.2:1.

== Awards and recognition ==
Clinton Public School was named a "Star School" by the New Jersey Department of Education, the highest honor that a New Jersey school can achieve, in the 1994-95 school year.

== School ==
Clinton Public School had an enrollment of 462 students in grades PreK-8 as of the 2021–22 school year.

- Seth Cohen, principal

The school building was built in 1923 to replace a previous structure destroyed in a large fire, with additions in 1969, 1996, and 2001.

== Sports ==
- Boys' and Girls' Soccer
- Boys' and Girls' Cross Country - The Boys' Cross Country team won the 2013 North Hunterdon-Voorhees District Meet after going 9-1, winning the title over their only loss from High Bridge Middle School by 4 points. Clinton Public had 3rd, 4th, 5th, 6th, and 18th place in the boys' race.
- Girls' Volleyball-The girls' volleyball team won the 2013 and 2014 district volleyball Tournament and in 2015 they placed 2nd.
- Boys' and Girls' Basketball
- Girls' Cheerleading
- Boys' Baseball
- Girls' Softball

== Administration ==
Core members of the district's administration include:

- Seth Cohen, superintendent
- Bernadette Wang, business administrator and board secretary

== Board of education ==
The district's board of education, comprised of five members, sets policy and oversees the fiscal and educational operation of the district through its administration. As a Type II school district, the board's trustees are elected directly by voters to serve three-year terms of office on a staggered basis, with either one or two seats up for election each year held (since 2012) as part of the November general election. The board appoints a superintendent to oversee the district's day-to-day operations and a business administrator to supervise the business functions of the district.
