= Tewksbury Township Schools =

School district in Hunterdon County, New Jersey, US

Address
- 173 Old Turnpike Road Tewksbury Township, Hunterdon County, New Jersey, 07830; United States
- Coordinates: 40.704782°N 74.774087°W

District information
- Grades: PreK to 8
- Superintendent: Jennifer Shouffler
- Business administrator: Heather Goguen
- Schools: 2

Students and staff
- Enrollment: 485 (as of 2023–24)
- Faculty: 54.0 FTEs
- Student–teacher ratio: 9.0:1

Other information
- District Factor Group: J
- Website: www.tewksburyschools.org
Ind.	Per pupil	District spending	Rank (*)	K-8 average	%± vs. average
1A	Total Spending	$19,529	45	$18,891	3.4%
1	Budgetary Cost	16,041	46	14,159	13.3%
2	Classroom Instruction	9,623	49	8,659	11.1%
6	Support Services	2,631	51	2,167	21.4%
8	Administrative Cost	1,821	45	1,547	17.7%
10	Operations & Maintenance	1,574	32	1,612	−2.4%
13	Extracurricular Activities	263	60	104	152.9%
16	Median Teacher Salary	66,430	52	61,136
Data from NJDoE 2014 Taxpayers' Guide to Education Spending. *Of K-8 districts with 401-750 students. Lowest spending=1; Highest=64

The Tewksbury Township Schools is a community public school district which operates two schools serving students in pre-kindergarten through eighth grade from Tewksbury Township, in Hunterdon County, in the U.S. state of New Jersey. The district and its schools are all located in Tewksbury Township, but have mailing addresses in Califon.

As of the 2023–24 school year, the district, comprised of two schools, had an enrollment of 485 students and 54.0 classroom teachers (on an FTE basis), for a student–teacher ratio of 9.0:1.

Public school students in ninth through twelfth grades attend Voorhees High School in Lebanon Township (although the mailing address is Glen Gardner), which also serves students from Califon, Glen Gardner, Hampton, High Bridge and Lebanon Township. As of the 2023–24 school year, the high school had an enrollment of 753 students and 73.9 classroom teachers (on an FTE basis), for a student–teacher ratio of 10.2:1. The school is part of the North Hunterdon-Voorhees Regional High School District, which also includes students from Bethlehem Township, Clinton Town, Clinton Township, Franklin Township, Lebanon Borough and Union Township who attend North Hunterdon High School in Annandale.

== History ==
In 2003, the district sold Sawmill, thecommunity's original elementary school, which opened in 1951, for $1 million to the Hunterdon County Educational Services Commission, along with its 7-acre (2.8 ha) site.

The district had been classified by the New Jersey Department of Education as being in District Factor Group "J", the-highest of eight groupings. District Factor Groups organize districts statewide to allow comparison by common socioeconomic characteristics of the local districts. From lowest socioeconomic status to highest, the categories are A, B, CD, DE, FG, GH, I and J.

== Awards and recognition ==
Tewksbury Elementary School was recognized in 2011 as a Blue Ribbon School by the United States Department of Education.

Old Turnpike School was one of nine schools in New Jersey honored in 2020 by the National Blue Ribbon Schools Program, which recognizes high student achievement.

== Schools ==
Schools in the district (with 2023–24 enrollment data from the National Center for Education Statistics) are:

Elementary school

- Tewksbury Elementary School with 260 students in grades PreK–4
  - Lisa Moore, principal
- Old Turnpike School with 223 students in grades 5–8
  - Michael Mitchell, principal

== Administration ==
Core members of the district's administration are:

- Jennifer Shouffler, superintendent
- Heather Goguen, business administrator and board secretary

== Board of education ==
The district's board of education, comprised of nine members, sets policy and oversees the fiscal and educational operation of the district through its administration. As a Type II school district, the board's trustees are elected directly by voters to serve three-year terms of office on a staggered basis, with three seats up for election each year held (since 2012) as part of the November general election. The board appoints a superintendent to oversee the district's day-to-day operations and a business administrator to supervise the business functions of the district.
