= Milford Borough School District =

School district in Hunterdon County, New Jersey, US

Address
- 7 Hillside Avenue Milford, Hunterdon County, New Jersey, 08848; United States
- Coordinates: 40.568766°N 75.093092°W

District information
- Grades: PreK–8
- Superintendent: Michele McCann
- Business administrator: Michele McCann
- Schools: 1

Students and staff
- Enrollment: 70 (as of 2023–24)
- Faculty: 9.1 FTEs
- Student–teacher ratio: 7.7:1

Other information
- District Factor Group: FG
- Website: www.milfordpublicschool.com
| Ind. | Per pupil | District spending | Rank (*) | K-8 average | %± vs. average |
|---|---|---|---|---|---|
| 1A | Total Spending | $20,590 | 47 | $18,891 | 9.0% |
| 1 | Budgetary Cost | 15,173 | 35 | 14,159 | 7.2% |
| 2 | Classroom Instruction | 8,781 | 27 | 8,659 | 1.4% |
| 6 | Support Services | 3,025 | 51 | 2,167 | 39.6% |
| 8 | Administrative Cost | 1,316 | 6 | 1,547 | −14.9% |
| 10 | Operations & Maintenance | 1,659 | 26 | 1,612 | 2.9% |
| 13 | Extracurricular Activities | 282 | 56 | 104 | 171.2% |
| 16 | Median Teacher Salary | 47,181 | 4 | 61,136 |
Data from NJDoE 2014 Taxpayers' Guide to Education Spending. *Of K-8 districts with up to 400 students. Lowest spending=1; Highest=71

The Milford Borough School District is a community public school district that serves students in pre-kindergarten through eighth grade from Milford, in Hunterdon County, in the U.S. state of New Jersey.

As of the 2023–24 school year, the district, comprised of one school, had an enrollment of 70 students and 9.1 classroom teachers (on an FTE basis), for a student–teacher ratio of 7.7:1. In the 2016–17 school year, the Milford district had the 5th-smallest enrollment of any school district in the state, with 81 students.

The district had been classified by the New Jersey Department of Education as being in District Factor Group "FG", the fourth-highest of eight groupings. District Factor Groups organize districts statewide to allow comparison by common socioeconomic characteristics of the local districts. From lowest socioeconomic status to highest, the categories are A, B, CD, DE, FG, GH, I and J.

Students in public school for ninth through twelfth grades attend Delaware Valley Regional High School, together with students from Alexandria Township, Frenchtown, Holland Township and Kingwood Township. As of the 2023–24 school year, the high school had an enrollment of 692 students and 61.5 classroom teachers (on an FTE basis), for a student–teacher ratio of 11.3:1.

== School ==
Milford Public School had an enrollment of 66 students in the 2023–24 school year.

== Administration ==
Core members of the district's administration are:

- Michele McCann, superintendent, business administrator and board secretary

== Board of education ==
The district's board of education, comprised of five members, sets policy and oversees the fiscal and educational operation of the district through its administration. As a Type II school district, the board's trustees are elected directly by voters to serve three-year terms of office on a staggered basis, with either one or two seats up for election each year held (since 2012) as part of the November general election. The board appoints a superintendent to oversee the district's day-to-day operations and a business administrator to supervise the business functions of the district.
