= East Amwell Township School District =

School district in Hunterdon County, New Jersey, US

Address
- 43 Wertsville Road Ringoes, Hunterdon County, New Jersey, 08551; United States
- Coordinates: 40.428351°N 74.858918°W

District information
- Grades: PreK-8
- Superintendent: Edward Stoloski
- Business administrator: Heidi Gara
- Schools: 1

Students and staff
- Enrollment: 374 (as of 2022–23)
- Faculty: 41.6 FTEs
- Student–teacher ratio: 9.0:1

Other information
- District Factor Group: I
- Website: www.eastamwell.org
Ind.	Per pupil	District spending	Rank (*)	K-8 average	%± vs. average
1A	Total Spending	$19,425	44	$18,891	2.8%
1	Budgetary Cost	16,843	53	14,159	19.0%
2	Classroom Instruction	10,209	56	8,659	17.9%
6	Support Services	2,594	48	2,167	19.7%
8	Administrative Cost	1,838	51	1,547	18.8%
10	Operations & Maintenance	1,874	54	1,612	16.3%
13	Extracurricular Activities	256	59	104	146.2%
16	Median Teacher Salary	60,480	34	61,136
Data from NJDoE 2014 Taxpayers' Guide to Education Spending. *Of K-8 districts with 401-750 students. Lowest spending=1; Highest=64

The East Amwell Township School District is a community public school district that serves students in pre-kindergarten through eighth grade from East Amwell Township, in Hunterdon County, in the U.S. state of New Jersey.

As of the 2022–23 school year, the district, comprising one school, had an enrollment of 374 students and 41.6 classroom teachers (on an FTE basis), for a student–teacher ratio of 9.0:1.

The district participates in the Interdistrict Public School Choice Program, which allows non-resident students to attend school in the district at no cost to their parents, with tuition covered by the resident district. Available slots are announced annually by grade.

The district had been classified by the New Jersey Department of Education as being in District Factor Group "I", the second-highest of eight groupings. District Factor Groups organize districts statewide to allow comparison by common socioeconomic characteristics of the local districts. From lowest socioeconomic status to highest, the categories are A, B, CD, DE, FG, GH, I and J.

Public school students in ninth through twelfth grades attend Hunterdon Central High School, part of the Hunterdon Central Regional High School District in central Hunterdon County, which also serves students from Delaware Township, Flemington Borough, Raritan Township and Readington Township. As of the 2021–22 school year, the high school had an enrollment of 2,575 students and 225.3 classroom teachers (on an FTE basis), for a student–teacher ratio of 11.4:1.

== School ==
East Amwell Township School had an enrollment of 358 students as of the 2021–22 school year.

- John Capuano, principal

== Administration ==
Core members of the district's administration are:

- Edward Stoloski, superintendent
- Heidi Gara, board secretary and business administrator

== Board of education ==
The district's board of education, composed of nine members, sets policy and oversees the fiscal and educational operation of the district through its administration. As a Type II school district, the board's trustees are elected directly by voters to serve three-year terms of office on a staggered basis, with three seats up for election each year held (since 2013) as part of the November general election. The board appoints a superintendent to oversee the district's day-to-day operations and a business administrator to supervise the business functions of the district.
