= Lebanon Township Schools =

School district in Hunterdon County, New Jersey, US

Address
- 70 Bunnvale Road Lebanon Township, Hunterdon County, New Jersey, 07830; United States
- Coordinates: 40.715855°N 74.886054°W

District information
- Grades: Pre-K to 8
- Superintendent: Jason Kornegay
- Business administrator: Abigail Postma
- Schools: 2

Students and staff
- Enrollment: 624 (as of 2018–19)
- Faculty: 64.6 FTEs
- Student–teacher ratio: 9.7:1

Other information
- District Factor Group: I
- Website: www.lebtwpk8.org
Ind.	Per pupil	District spending	Rank (*)	K-8 average	%± vs. average
1A	Total Spending	$18,590	35	$18,891	−1.6%
1	Budgetary Cost	16,064	48	14,159	13.5%
2	Classroom Instruction	10,140	54	8,659	17.1%
6	Support Services	2,477	43	2,167	14.3%
8	Administrative Cost	1,848	55	1,547	19.5%
10	Operations & Maintenance	1,465	24	1,612	−9.1%
13	Extracurricular Activities	133	34	104	27.9%
16	Median Teacher Salary	58,796	28	61,136
Data from NJDoE 2014 Taxpayers' Guide to Education Spending. *Of K-8 districts with 401-750 students. Lowest spending=1; Highest=64

The Lebanon Township Schools is a community public school district that serves students in pre-kindergarten through eighth grade from Lebanon Township, in Hunterdon County, in the U.S. state of New Jersey.

As of the 2018–19 school year, the district, comprising two schools, had an enrollment of 624 students and 64.6 classroom teachers (on an FTE basis), for a student–teacher ratio of 9.7:1.

The district is classified by the New Jersey Department of Education as being in District Factor Group "I", the second-highest of eight groupings. District Factor Groups organize districts statewide to allow comparison by common socioeconomic characteristics of the local districts. From lowest socioeconomic status to highest, the categories are A, B, CD, DE, FG, GH, I and J.

Starting in the 2018–19 school year, middle school students in grades 6 through 8 from the Hampton School District will attend Woodglen School on a tuition basis as part of a sending/receiving relationship.

Public school students in ninth through twelfth grades attend Voorhees High School, which also serves students from Califon, Glen Gardner, Hampton, High Bridge and Tewksbury Township. As of the 2018–19 school year, the high school had an enrollment of 982 students and 83.1 classroom teachers (on an FTE basis), for a student–teacher ratio of 11.8:1. The school is part of the North Hunterdon-Voorhees Regional High School District, which also includes students from Bethlehem Township, Clinton Town, Clinton Township, Franklin Township, Lebanon Borough and Union Township who attend North Hunterdon High School in Annandale.

== Schools ==
Schools in the district (with 2018–19 enrollment data from the National Center for Education Statistics) are:

Elementary school

- Valley View School with 310 students in grades PreK-4
  - Patricia A. Bell, principal

Middle school

- Woodglen School with 320 students in grades 5-8
  - Michael B. Rubright, principal

Both schools are located in Lebanon Township, but have a Califon mailing address.

== Administration ==
Core members of the district's administration are:

- Jason R. Kornegay, superintendent
- Abigail Postma, business administrator

== Board of education ==
The district's board of education, composed of nine members, sets policy and oversees the fiscal and educational operation of the district through its administration. As a Type II school district, the board's trustees are elected directly by voters to serve three-year terms of office on a staggered basis, with three seats up for election each year held (since 2012) as part of the November general election. The board appoints a superintendent to oversee the district's day-to-day operations and a business administrator to supervise the business functions of the district.
