= Hunterdon County Arboretum =

Arboretum in Lebanon, New Jersey, US

Coordinates: 40.5784°N 74.8595°W

- Interactive map of Hunterdon County Arboretum
- Website: Official website

The Hunterdon County Arboretum, covering 73 acres (30 ha), is an arboretum located at 1020 Route 31 in Lebanon, New Jersey, United States. It is the headquarters of Hunterdon County's park system, and open to the public daily without charge.

The arboretum began as a commercial nursery in 1953, growing both native and exotic trees. In 1974 the site was acquired by the Park Department. It now includes six walking trails with a total length of 2 miles (3.2 km).

== See also ==
- List of botanical gardens in the United States
