= Califon School District =

School district in Hunterdon County, New Jersey, US

Address
- 6 School Street Califon, Hunterdon County, New Jersey, 07830; United States
- Coordinates: 40.72496°N 74.839716°W

District information
- Grades: Pre-K to 8
- Superintendent: Michele Cone
- Business administrator: Matthew Herzer
- Schools: 1

Students and staff
- Enrollment: 85 (as of 2023–24)
- Faculty: 14.9 FTEs
- Student–teacher ratio: 5.7:1

Other information
- District Factor Group: I
- Website: www.califonschool.org
Ind.	Per pupil	District spending	Rank (*)	K-8 average	%± vs. average
1A	Total Spending	$18,297	37	$18,891	−3.1%
1	Budgetary Cost	17,095	51	14,159	20.7%
2	Classroom Instruction	10,512	55	8,659	21.4%
6	Support Services	3,282	52	2,167	51.5%
8	Administrative Cost	1,485	20	1,547	−4.0%
10	Operations & Maintenance	1,546	23	1,612	−4.1%
13	Extracurricular Activities	207	47	104	99.0%
16	Median Teacher Salary	47,460	5	61,136
Data from NJDoE 2014 Taxpayers' Guide to Education Spending. *Of K-8 districts with up to 400 students. Lowest spending=1; Highest=71

The Califon School District is a community public school district that serves students in pre-kindergarten through eighth grade from Califon, in Hunterdon County, in the U.S. state of New Jersey.

As of the 2023–24 school year, the district, comprised of one school, had an enrollment of 85 students and 14.9 classroom teachers (on an FTE basis), for a student–teacher ratio of 5.7:1. In the 2016-17 school year, Califon had the seventh-smallest enrollment of any school district in the state.

The district had been classified by the New Jersey Department of Education as being in District Factor Group "I", the second-highest of eight groupings. District Factor Groups organize districts statewide to allow comparison by common socioeconomic characteristics of the local districts. From lowest socioeconomic status to highest, the categories are A, B, CD, DE, FG, GH, I and J.

Public school students in ninth through twelfth grades attend Voorhees High School, which also serves students from Glen Gardner, Hampton, High Bridge, Lebanon Township and Tewksbury Township. As of the 2023–24 school year, the high school had an enrollment of 753 students and 73.9 classroom teachers (on an FTE basis), for a student–teacher ratio of 10.2:1. The school is part of the North Hunterdon-Voorhees Regional High School District, which also includes students from Bethlehem Township, Clinton Town, Clinton Township, Franklin Township, Lebanon Borough and Union Township who attend North Hunterdon High School in Annandale.

== School ==
Califon Public School serves students in grades PreK-8 and had an enrollment of 84 students for the 2023–24 school year.

- Daniel Patton, principal

== Administration ==
Core members of the district's administration are:

- Michele Cone, superintendent
- Matthew Herzer, business administrator and board secretary

== Board of education ==
The district's board of education is comprised of five members who set policy and oversee the fiscal and educational operation of the district through its administration. As a Type II school district, the board's trustees are elected directly by voters to serve three-year terms of office on a staggered basis, with either one or two seats up for election each year held (since 2012) as part of the November general election. The board appoints a superintendent to oversee the district's day-to-day operations and a business administrator to supervise the business functions of the district.
