= Hampton School District (New Jersey) =

School district in Hunterdon County, New Jersey, US

Address
- 32-41 South Street Hampton, Hunterdon County, New Jersey, 08827; United States
- Coordinates: 40.705731°N 74.95572°W

District information
- Grades: PreK-5
- Superintendent: Daniel Kerr
- Business administrator: James Schlessinger
- Schools: 1

Students and staff
- Enrollment: 112 (as of 2022–23)
- Faculty: 14.8 FTEs
- Student–teacher ratio: 7.6:1

Other information
- District Factor Group: DE
- Website: www.hamptonpublicschool.org
Ind.	Per pupil	District spending	Rank (*)	K-8 average	%± vs. average
1A	Total Spending	$31,153	69	$18,891	64.9%
1	Budgetary Cost	24,145	68	14,159	70.5%
2	Classroom Instruction	14,301	68	8,659	65.2%
6	Support Services	4,735	68	2,167	118.5%
8	Administrative Cost	1,565	30	1,547	1.2%
10	Operations & Maintenance	3,306	66	1,612	105.1%
13	Extracurricular Activities	238	52	104	128.8%
16	Median Teacher Salary	66,525	63	61,136
Data from NJDoE 2014 Taxpayers' Guide to Education Spending. *Of K-8 districts with up to 400 students. Lowest spending=1; Highest=71

The Hampton School District is a community public school district that serves students in pre-kindergarten through fifth grade from Hampton, in Hunterdon County, in the U.S. state of New Jersey.

As of the 2022–23 school year, the district, comprised of one school, had an enrollment of 112 students and 14.8 classroom teachers (on an FTE basis), for a student–teacher ratio of 7.6:1. In the 2016–17 school year, Hampton was the 15th-smallest enrollment of any school district in the state, with 128 students.

The district participates in the Interdistrict Public School Choice Program, which allows non-resident students to attend school in the district at no cost to their parents, with tuition covered by the resident district. Available slots are announced annually by grade.

The district had been classified by the New Jersey Department of Education as being in District Factor Group "DE", the fifth-highest of eight groupings. District Factor Groups organize districts statewide to allow comparison by common socioeconomic characteristics of the local districts. From lowest socioeconomic status to highest, the categories are A, B, CD, DE, FG, GH, I and J.

Starting in the 2018–19 school year, middle school students in grades 6 through 8 are sent to the Lebanon Township Schools on a tuition basis as part of a sending/receiving relationship. As of the 2022–23 school year, Woodglen School had an enrollment of 292 students and 32.4 classroom teachers (on an FTE basis), for a student–teacher ratio of 9.0:1.

Students in public school for ninth through twelfth grades attend Voorhees High School, which also serves the communities of Califon, Glen Gardner (the home of the school), High Bridge, Lebanon Township and Tewksbury Township. As of the 2022–23 school year, the high school had an enrollment of 672 students and 72.3 classroom teachers (on an FTE basis), for a student–teacher ratio of 9.3:1. The school is part of the North Hunterdon-Voorhees Regional High School District, which also serves students from Bethlehem Township, Clinton Town, Clinton Township, Franklin Township, Lebanon Borough and Union Township at North Hunterdon High School in Clinton Township.

== School ==
The Hampton Public School served an enrollment of 103 students as of the 2022–23 school year.

== Administration ==
Core members of the district's administration are:

- Daniel Kerr, superintendent
- James Schlessinger, business administrator and board secretary

== Board of education ==
The district's board of education, composed of five members, sets policy and oversees the fiscal and educational operation of the district through its administration. As a Type II school district, the board's trustees are elected directly by voters to serve three-year terms of office on a staggered basis, with either one or two seats up for election each year held (since 2012) as part of the November general election. The board appoints a superintendent to oversee the district's day-to-day operations and a business administrator to supervise the business functions of the district.
