= William Cotton (artist) =

American artist and dramatist

William Henry Cotton (July 22, 1880 – January 5, 1958) was an American portrait painter, caricaturist, and playwright.

Cotton was born in Newport, Rhode Island in 1880. He studied painting with Joseph DeCamp and Andreas Anderson at the Cowles Art School in Boston, and then at the Académie Julian in Paris with Jean-Paul Laurens.

== Background ==
He was a founder of the National National Association of Portrait Painters and a member of the Newport Art Association. Cotton exhibited at the National Academy of Design in New York City, the Corcoran Gallery of Art in Washington, DC, the Art Institute of Chicago, the Pennsylvania Academy of the Fine Arts, and the Saint Louis Art Museum. He was also invited by the government of France to exhibit at the Musée du Luxembourg. In 1916, he was elected into the National Academy of Design as an Associate Academician.

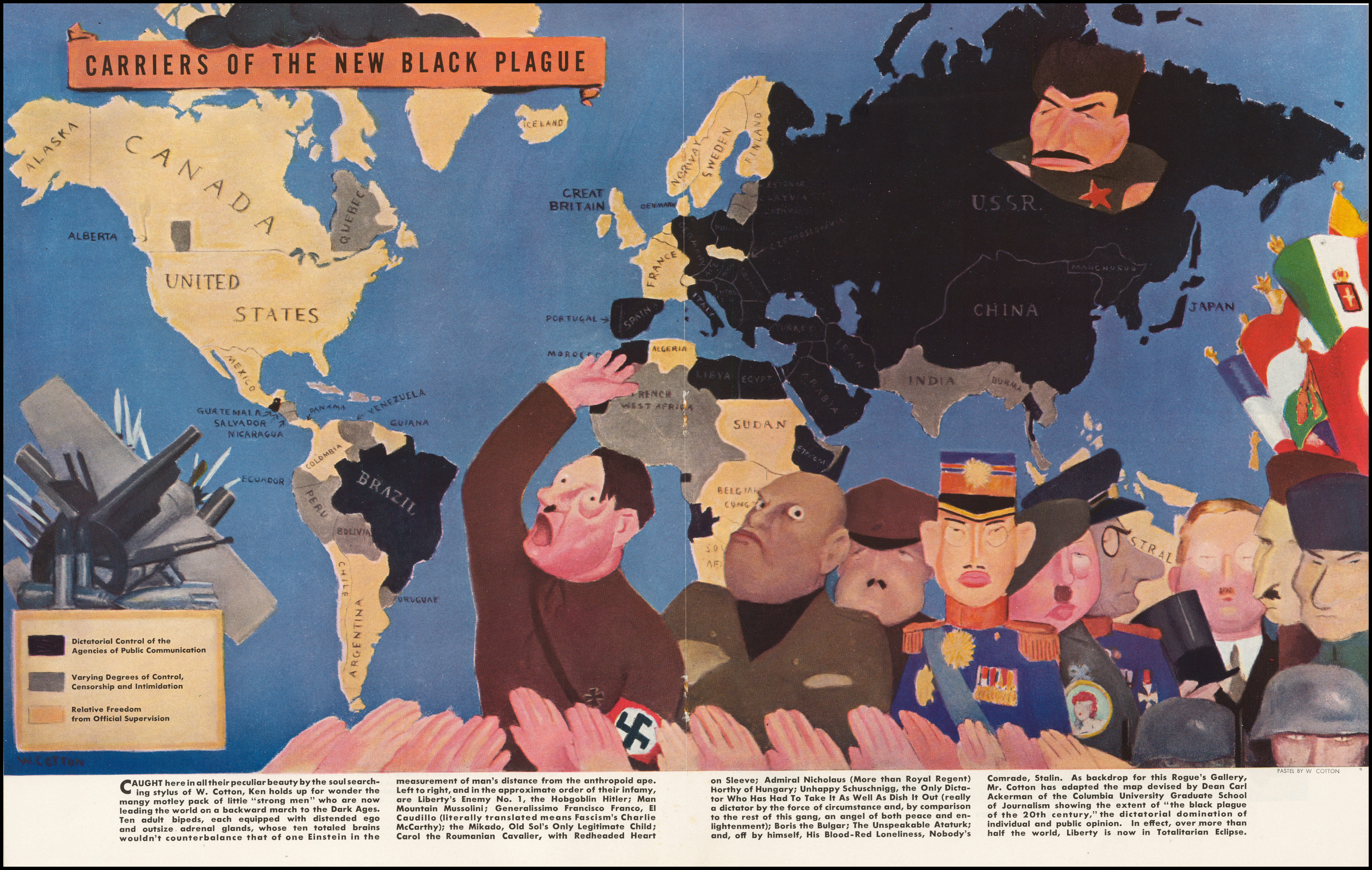
Famous satirical pictorial map by Cotton

After a successful career as a portrait painter, he began working as a caricaturist for Vanity Fair in 1931 and for The New Yorker the following year. In 1931, the New York Repertory Company produced a comedy he wrote, "The Bride the Sun Shines On", at the Fulton Theatre in New York.

He also painted mural decorations for New York City theaters, including the Capitol, Apollo, Times Square, and Selwyn theaters.

In 1958, Cotton died at his home in Sergeantsville section of Delaware Township, Hunterdon County, New Jersey at the age of 77.
