= Wertsville, New Jersey =

Populated place in Hunterdon County, New Jersey, US

- Unincorporated community
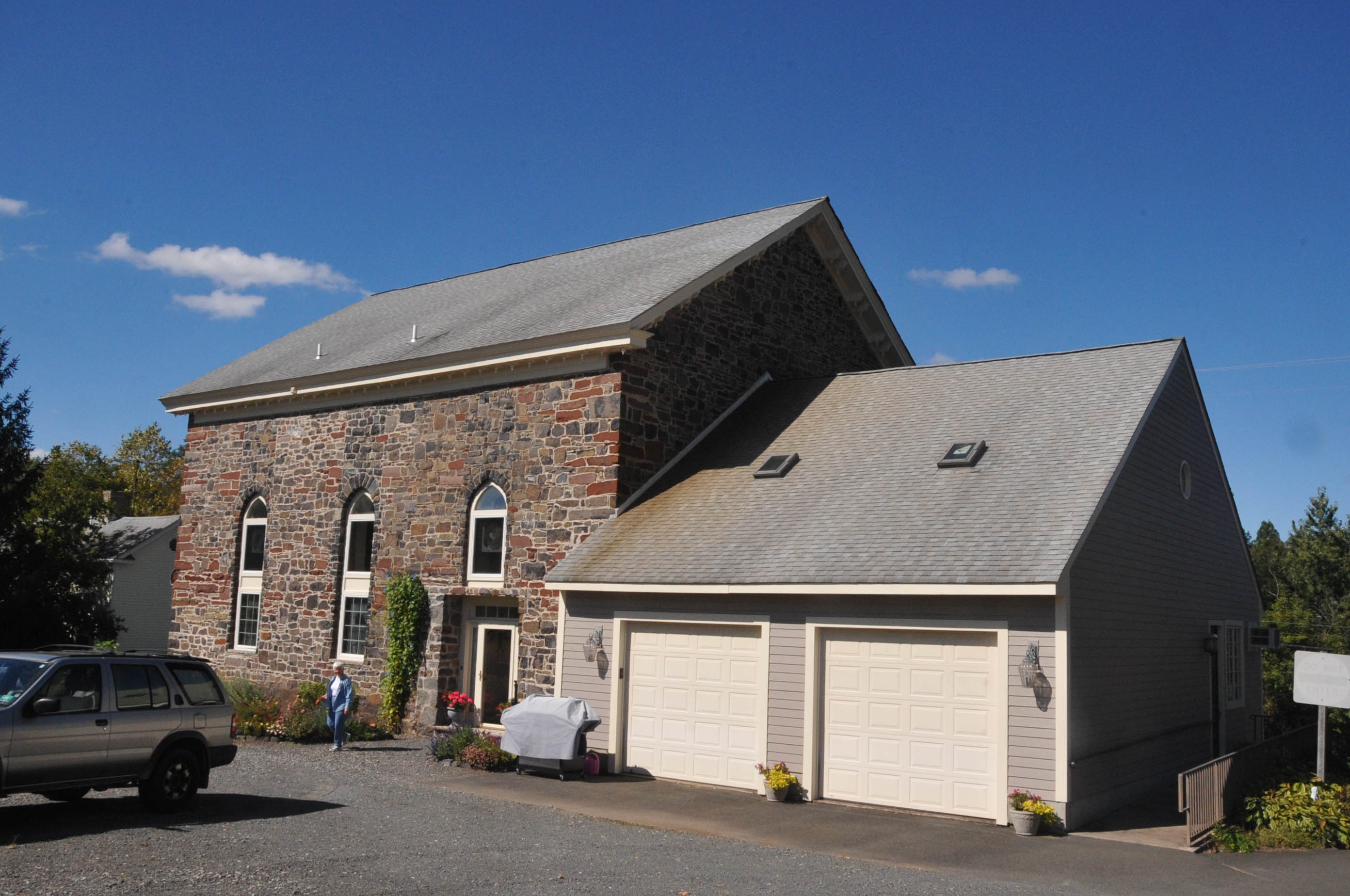
- Former Amwell Baptist Church

- Location of Wertsville in Hunterdon County Inset: Location of county within the state of New Jersey Wertsville (New Jersey) Wertsville (the United States)
- Coordinates: 40°26′59″N 74°47′52″W
- Country: United States
- State: New Jersey
- County: Hunterdon
- Township: East Amwell
- Named for: Werts family
- Elevation: 154 ft (47 m)
- GNIS feature ID: 881666

Wertsville is an unincorporated community located along County Route 602 (Wertsville Road) in East Amwell Township of Hunterdon County, in the U.S. state of New Jersey.

== History ==
The settlement is named for the Werts family, and was known locally as "Werts' Corners".

By 1881, Wertsville had a school, Baptist church, post office, store, shoemaker shop and wagon shop.

== Historic district ==
- Wertsville Historic District
- U.S. National Register of Historic Places
- U.S. Historic district
- New Jersey Register of Historic Places
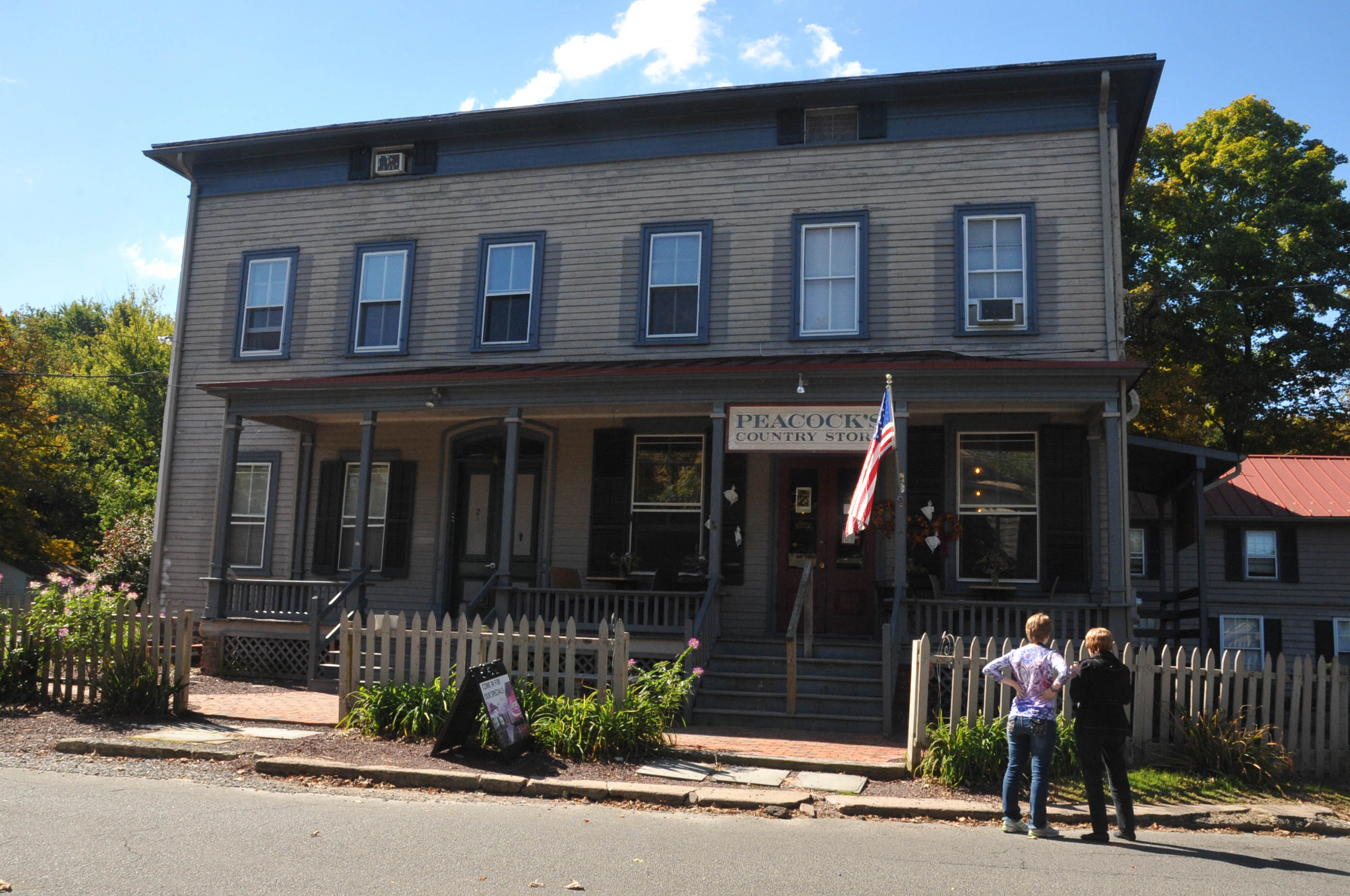
- P.V.D. Manners Store
- Location: Wertsville and Lindbergh roads
- Area: 284 acres (115 ha)
- Architectural style: Federal, Greek Revival, Italianate
- NRHP reference No.: 00001150
- NJRHP No.: 54

Significant dates
- Added to NRHP: October 5, 2000
- Designated NJRHP: August 3, 2000

The Wertsville Historic District is a 284-acre (115 ha) historic district encompassing the community along Wertsville and Lindbergh roads. It was added to the National Register of Historic Places on October 5, 2000 for its significance in architecture, commerce, and community planning and development. The district includes 31 contributing buildings. The Amwell Baptist Church was built in 1834 with Greek Revival style, and remodeled in 1884. It is now a residence. The P.V.D. Manners Store was built in 1883 with Italianate style and is now known as Peacock's Country Store.

== See also ==
- National Register of Historic Places listings in Hunterdon County, New Jersey
