= Hoffman Park =

Park in New Jersey

Coordinates: 40.5796°N 74.8614°W

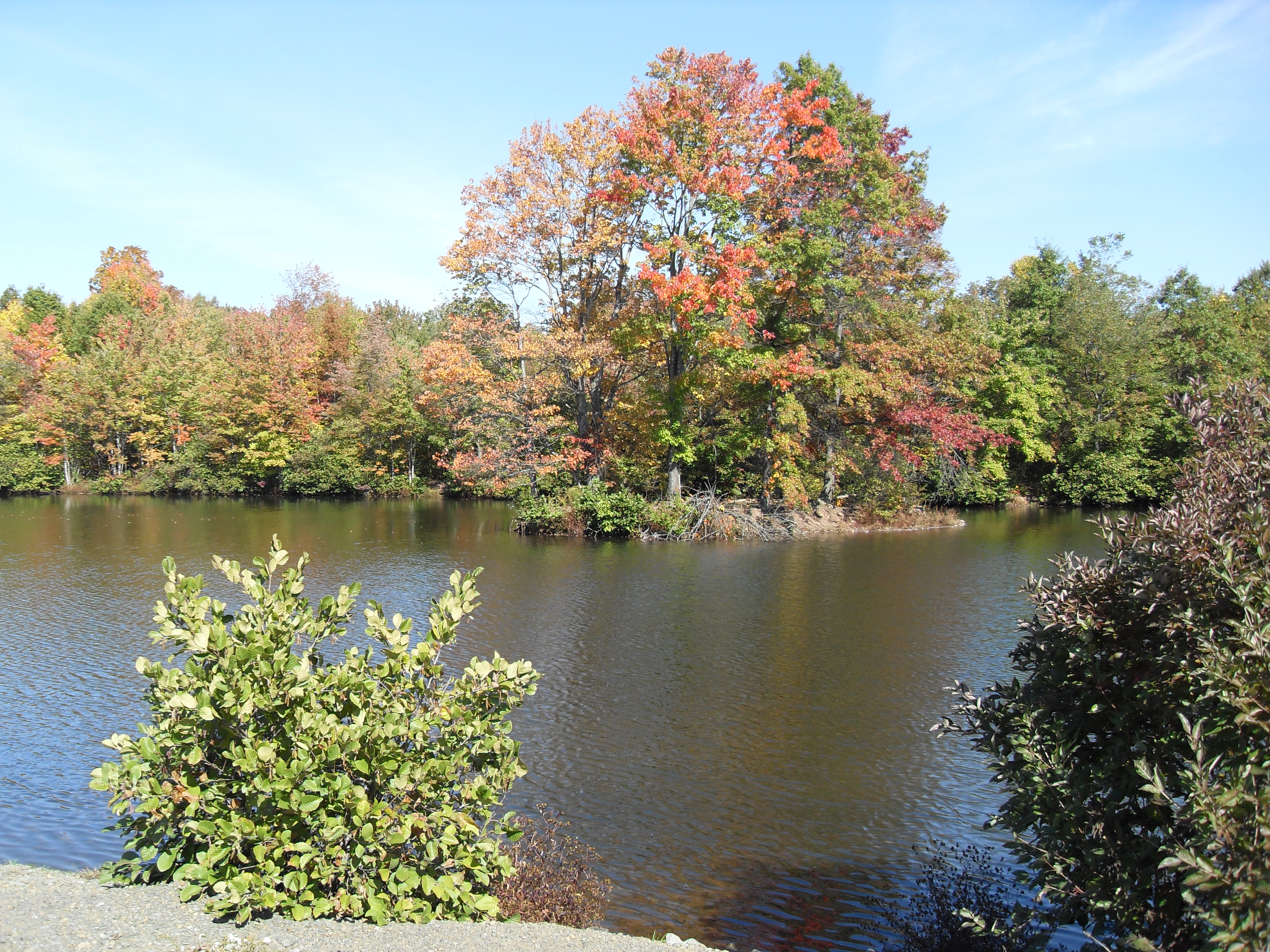
Hoffman Park, Hunterdon County, NJ

Hoffman Park is a 354-acre (1.43 km^{2}) park in Union Township, Hunterdon County, New Jersey that is operated by the Hunterdon County Department of Parks and Recreation.

The park contains hardwood forests, grasslands and 32 ponds, Manny's Pond being the largest. It contains several paved and gravel trails for walking and biking. Deer hunting is allowed by permit in some sections of the park.

The park setting provides a habitat for many birds including bobolinks, eastern meadowlarks, eastern bluebirds, grasshopper sparrows, and Savannah sparrows. The larger ponds contain bass and sunfish.

The park is named after the former owners, Albert and Joyce Hoffmann; Hoffman was the son of the founder of the Hoffman Beverage Company of Irvington, New Jersey.

The Norfolk Southern Railway's Lehigh Line (formerly the mainline of the Lehigh Valley Railroad), runs next to the park and can be seen from a distance from the park's parking lot.
