= Sergeantsville, New Jersey =

Populated place in Hunterdon County, New Jersey, US

- Unincorporated community
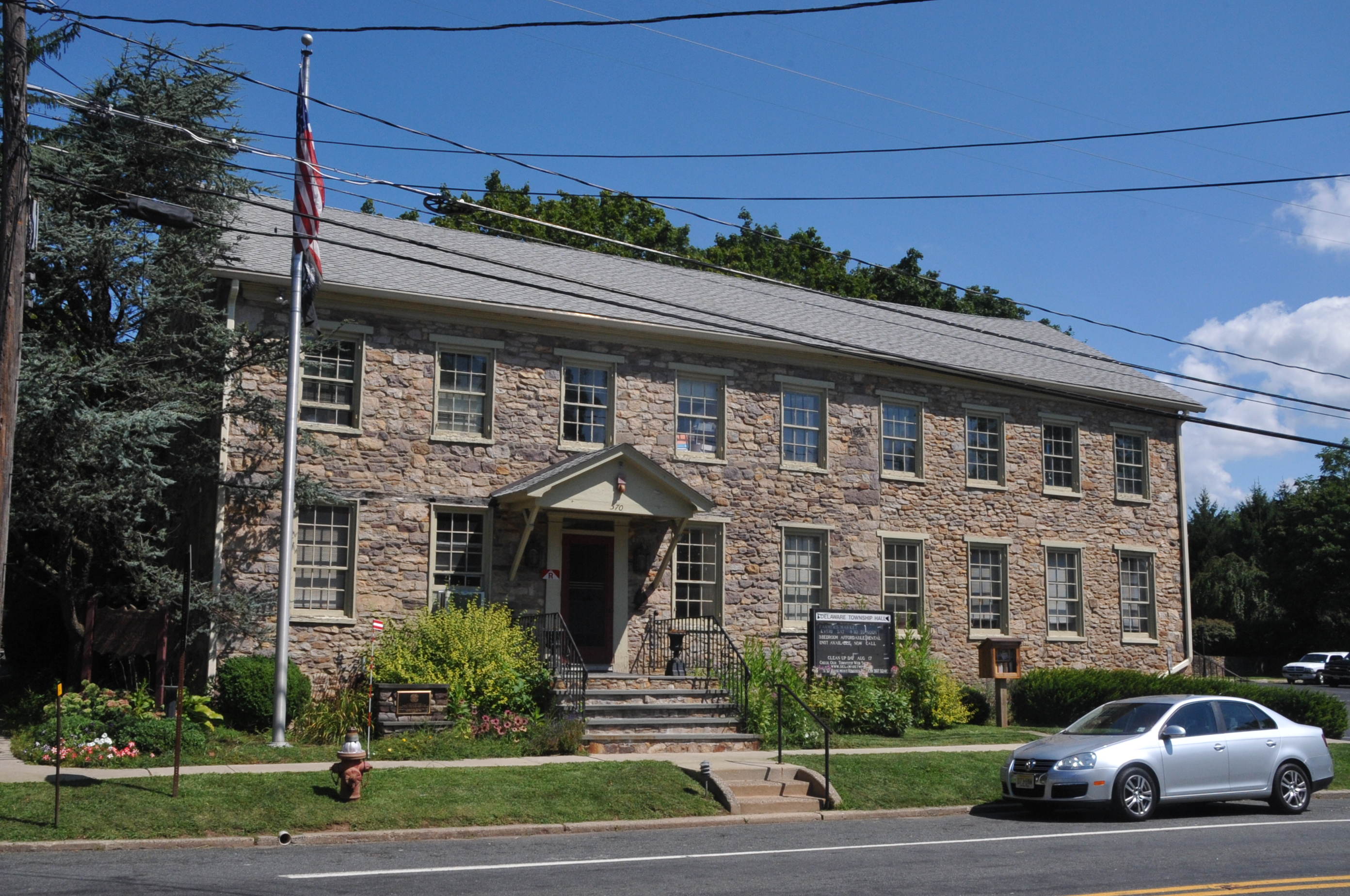
- Delaware Township Hall in Sergeantsville

- Sergeantsville's location in Hunterdon County (Inset: Hunterdon County in New Jersey) Sergeantsville, New Jersey (New Jersey) Sergeantsville, New Jersey (the United States)
- Coordinates: 40°26′45″N 74°56′37″W
- Country: United States
- State: New Jersey
- County: Hunterdon
- Township: Delaware
- Named for: Charles Sergeant
- Elevation: 338 ft (103 m)
- ZIP code: 08557
- GNIS feature ID: 0880475

- Sergeantsville Historic District
- U.S. National Register of Historic Places
- U.S. Historic district
- NRHP reference No.: 09000972
- Added to NRHP: December 2, 2009

Sergeantsville (pronounced "SIR-jints-vil") is a historic unincorporated community located within Delaware Township, in Hunterdon County, in the U.S. state of New Jersey.

Sergeantsville was first settled by a Mr. Thatcher in 1700, and was later named for Charles Sergeant, an American Revolutionary War soldier, in honor of the Sergeant family of which three brothers were local shopkeepers. "Out-of-towners give themselves away when they pronounce the first syllable 'sarge'; it's 'serge.'" Green Sergeant's Covered Bridge, constructed in 1872 across the Wickecheoke Creek, is located just west of Sergeantsville and is the oldest remaining covered bridge in New Jersey.

Sergeantsville was named in 1827 when it became desirable to establish a post office. Until that time, this largely rural area was known as "Skunktown", perhaps because the town served as a market center for skunk pelts.

Sergeantsville's annual "Thanksgiving in the Country" house tour, established in 1973, takes four or five different homes each year, that have historical, architectural or cultural qualities.

== Notable people ==
People who were born in, residents of, or otherwise closely associated with Sergeantsville include:

- William Cotton (1880–1958), portrait painter, caricaturist, and playwright.
- Gabby Provenzano (born 1999), professional soccer player who plays as a midfielder or center back for Portland Thorns FC in the National Women's Soccer League
