= List of school districts in New Jersey =

School districts in New Jersey may operate as single-municipality, regional, consolidated or countywide districts.

Most New Jersey school districts are Type 2 school districts, counted as independent governmental agencies by the U.S. Census Bureau. The Type 1 school districts, which include school districts dependent on municipal governments, are not counted as independent governments by the Census Bureau. New Jersey also has several county vocational school districts and special services school districts, as well as three state-operated school districts, also not counted by the Census Bureau as independent governments.

In 2022, due to New Jersey law allowing for hyperlocal governance of education, the state had over 600 school districts, a high number in comparison to states which have county-based school districts. In 2022 the state passed a law encouraging merging of school districts.

There are some non-operating school districts, which never operated or no longer operate any school facilities and where all students have attended school in other districts as part of sending/receiving relationships. 13 of those districts were abolished in 2009. Other districts remained in place after political resistance, based on a desire to avoid increased taxation. The state government instead allowed tax rates in the remaining districts to increase. As of 2019 16 non-operating districts remained in existence.

== Atlantic County ==
- Absecon Public School District – PreK-8
- Atlantic City School District – PreK-12
- Atlantic County Special Services School District – Special Services
- Atlantic County Vocational School District – Vocational
- Brigantine Public Schools – PreK-8
- Buena Regional School District – Regional
- Egg Harbor City School District – PreK-8
- Egg Harbor Township Schools – PreK-12
- Estell Manor School District – K-8
- Folsom Borough School District – PreK-8
- Galloway Township Public Schools – PreK-8
- Greater Egg Harbor Regional High School District – Regional
- Hamilton Township Schools – PreK-8
- Hammonton Public Schools – K-12
- Linwood Public Schools – PreK-8
- Mainland Regional High School – Regional
- Margate City Schools – K-8
- Mullica Township Schools – PreK-8
- Northfield Community Schools – K-8
- Pleasantville Public Schools – K-12
- Port Republic School District – K-8
- Somers Point Public Schools – PreK-8
- Ventnor City School District – PreK-8
- Weymouth Township School District – PreK-8
- Corbin City School District - Non-operating
- Longport School District - Non-operating

== Bergen County ==
- Allendale School District – PreK-8
- Alpine Public School District – K-8
- Bergen County Special Services School District – Special Services
- Bergen County Technical Schools – Vocational
- Bergenfield Public School District – K-12
- Bogota Public Schools – K-12
- Carlstadt Public Schools – PreK-8
- Carlstadt-East Rutherford Regional School District – Regional
- Cliffside Park School District – PreK-12
- Closter Public Schools – PreK-8
- Cresskill Public Schools – PreK-12
- Demarest Public Schools – K-8
- Dumont Public Schools – PreK-12
- East Rutherford School District – PreK-8
- Edgewater Public Schools – PreK-6
- Elmwood Park Public Schools – PreK-12
- Emerson School District – PreK-12
- Englewood Public School District – PreK-12
- Englewood Cliffs Public Schools – PreK-8
- Fair Lawn Public Schools – K-12
- Fairview Public Schools – PreK-8
- Fort Lee School District – PreK-12
- Franklin Lakes Public Schools – PreK-8
- Garfield Public Schools – PreK-12
- Glen Rock Public Schools – K-12
- Hackensack Public Schools – PreK-12
- Harrington Park School District – PreK-8
- Hasbrouck Heights School District – PreK-12
- Haworth Public Schools – K-8
- Hillsdale Public Schools – K-8
- Ho-Ho-Kus School District – PreK-8
- Leonia Public Schools – PreK-12
- Little Ferry Public Schools – K-8
- Lodi Public Schools – PreK-12
- Lyndhurst School District – PreK-12
- Mahwah Township Public Schools – PreK-12
- Maywood Public Schools – PreK-8
- Midland Park School District – PreK-12
- Montvale Public Schools – PreK-8
- Moonachie School District – PreK-8
- New Milford School District – K-12
- North Arlington School District – PreK-12
- Northern Highlands Regional High School – Regional
- Northern Valley Regional High School District – Regional
- Northvale Public Schools – K-8
- Norwood Public School District – K-8
- Oakland Public Schools – K-8
- Old Tappan Public Schools – K-8
- Oradell Public School District – K-6
- Palisades Park Public School District – PreK-12
- Paramus Public Schools – PreK-12
- Park Ridge Public Schools – PreK-12
- Pascack Valley Regional High School District – Regional
- Ramapo Indian Hills Regional High School District – Regional
- Ramsey Public School District – PreK-12
- Ridgefield School District – PreK-12
- Ridgefield Park Public Schools – PreK-12
- Ridgewood Public Schools – PreK-12
- River Dell Regional School District – Regional
- River Edge Elementary School District – PreK-6
- River Vale Public Schools – PreK-8
- Rochelle Park School District – PreK-8
- Rutherford School District – PreK-12
- Saddle Brook Public Schools – PreK-12
- Saddle River School District – PreK-5
- South Bergen Jointure Commission – Special Services
- South Hackensack School District – PreK-8
- Teaneck Public Schools – PreK-12
- Tenafly Public Schools – PreK-12
- Upper Saddle River School District – PreK-8
- Waldwick Public School District – PreK-12
- Wallington Public Schools – PreK-12
- Westwood Regional School District – Regional
- Wood-Ridge School District – PreK-12
- Woodcliff Lake Public Schools – PreK-8
- Wyckoff School District – PreK-8
- Rockleigh School District - Non-operating

== Burlington County ==
- Bass River Township School District – PreK-6
- Beverly City Schools – PreK-8
- Bordentown Regional School District – Regional
- Burlington County Institute of Technology – Vocational
- Burlington County Special Services School District – Special Services
- Burlington Township School District – PreK-12
- Chesterfield School District – PreK-6
- Cinnaminson Township Public Schools – PreK-12
- City of Burlington Public School District – PreK-12
- Delanco Township School District – K-8
- Delran Township School District – PreK-12
- Eastampton Township School District – K-8
- Edgewater Park School District – PreK-8
- Evesham Township School District – PreK-8
- Florence Township School District – PreK-12
- Hainesport Township School District – PreK-8
- Lenape Regional High School District – Regional
- Lumberton Township School District – PreK-8
- Mansfield Public Schools – K-6
- Maple Shade School District – PreK-12
- Medford Lakes School District – PreK-8
- Medford Township Public Schools – PreK-8
- Moorestown Township Public Schools – PreK-12
- Mount Holly Township Public Schools – PreK-8
- Mount Laurel Schools – PreK-8
- New Hanover Township School District – Consolidated
- North Hanover Township School District – K-6
- Northern Burlington County Regional School District – Regional
- Palmyra Public Schools – PreK-12
- Pemberton Township School District – PreK-12
- Rancocas Valley Regional High School – Regional
- Riverside School District – PreK-12
- Riverton School District – K-8
- Shamong Township School District – PreK-8
- Southampton Township Schools – K-8
- Springfield Township School District – PreK-6
- Tabernacle School District – K-8
- Washington Township School District – PreK-8 (non-operating)
- Westampton Township Schools – PreK-8
- Willingboro Public Schools – PreK-12
- Woodland Township School District – PreK-8

The U.S. Census Bureau lists "Joint Base McGuire-Dix-Lakehurst" in Burlington County as having its own school district. Students attend area school district public schools, as the Department of Defense Education Activity (DoDEA) does not operate any schools on that base. Students on McGuire and Dix may attend one of the following in their respective grade levels, with all siblings in a family taking the same choice: North Hanover Township School District (PK-6), Northern Burlington County Regional School District (7-12), and Pemberton Township School District (K-12).

== Camden County ==
- Audubon School District – PreK-12
- Barrington Public Schools – PreK-8
- Bellmawr School District – PreK-8
- Berlin Borough School District – PreK-8
- Berlin Township Public Schools – PreK-8
- Black Horse Pike Regional School District – Regional
- Brooklawn Public School District – PreK-8
- Camden City School District – PreK-12
- Camden County Technical Schools – Vocational
- Cherry Hill Public Schools – PreK-12
- Chesilhurst Borough School District – Non-operated since 2009
- Clementon School District – PreK-8
- Collingswood Public Schools – PreK-12
- Eastern Camden County Regional High School District – Regional
- Gibbsboro School District – PreK-8
- Gloucester City Public Schools – PreK-12
- Gloucester Township Public Schools – PreK-8
- Haddon Heights School District – K-12
- Haddon Township School District – PreK-12
- Haddonfield Public Schools – PreK-12
- Laurel Springs School District – PreK-6
- Lawnside School District – PreK-8
- Lindenwold Public Schools – PreK-12
- Lower Camden County Regional School District – Dissolved in 2001
- Magnolia School District – PreK-8
- Merchantville School District – PreK-8
- Mount Ephraim Public Schools – PreK-8
- Oaklyn Public School District – PreK-5
- Pennsauken Public Schools – PreK-12
- Pine Hill Schools – PreK-12
- Runnemede Public School District – PreK-8
- Somerdale School District – PreK-8
- Sterling High School – Regional
- Stratford School District – PreK-8
- Voorhees Township Public Schools – PreK-8
- Waterford Township School District – PreK-6
- Winslow Township School District – PreK-12
- Woodlynne School District – PreK-8
- Chesilhurst School District - Non-operating
- Hi Nella School District - Non-operating
- Pine Valley School District - Non-operating

== Cape May County ==
- Avalon School District – PreK-8
- Cape May City School District – PreK-6
- Cape May County Special Services School District – Special Services
- Cape May County Technical School District – Vocational
- Dennis Township Public Schools – PreK-8
- Lower Cape May Regional School District – Regional
- Lower Township School District – PreK-6
- Middle Township Public Schools – K-12
- North Wildwood School District – PreK-8
- Ocean City School District – PreK-12
- Stone Harbor School District – K-8
- Upper Township School District – PreK-8
- West Cape May School District – PreK-6
- Wildwood Public School District – PreK-12
- Wildwood Crest School District – PreK-8
- Woodbine School District – PreK-8
- Cape May Point School District (non-operating, since 1931)
- Sea Isle City School District (non-operating, since 2012)
- West Wildwood School District (non-operating)

== Cumberland County ==
- Bridgeton Public Schools – PreK-12
- Commercial Township School District – K-8
- Cumberland County Vocational School District – Vocational
- Cumberland Regional High School – Regional
- Deerfield Township School District – PreK-8
- Downe Township School District – PreK-8
- Fairfield Township School District – PreK-8
- Greenwich Township School District – K-8
- Hopewell Township School District – K-8
- Maurice River Township School District – PreK-8
- Millville Public Schools – PreK-12
- Salem County Special Services School District – Special Services
- Stow Creek School District – PreK-8
- Upper Deerfield Township Schools – PreK-8
- Vineland Public Schools – PreK-12

== Essex County ==
- Belleville School District – PreK-12
- Bloomfield Public Schools – PreK-12
- Caldwell-West Caldwell Public Schools – PreK-12
- Cedar Grove Schools – PreK-12
- East Orange School District – PreK-12
- Essex County Schools of Technology – Vocational
- Essex Fells School District – K-6
- Fairfield School District – PreK-6
- Glen Ridge Public Schools – PreK-12
- Irvington Public Schools – PreK-12
- Livingston Public Schools – PreK-12
- Millburn Township Public Schools – PreK-12
- Montclair Public Schools – PreK-12
- Newark Public Schools – PreK-12
- North Caldwell Public Schools – PreK-6
- Nutley Public Schools – PreK-12
- Orange Board of Education – PreK-12
- Roseland School District – PreK-6
- South Orange-Maplewood School District – PreK-12
- Verona Public Schools – PreK-12
- West Essex Regional School District – Regional
- West Orange Public Schools – PreK-12

== Gloucester County ==
- Clayton Public Schools – K-12
- Clearview Regional High School District – Regional
- Delsea Regional School District – Regional
- Deptford Township Schools – PreK-12
- East Greenwich Township School District – PreK-6
- Elk Township School District – PreK-6
- Franklin Township Public Schools – PreK-6
- Gateway Regional School District – Regional
- Glassboro Public Schools – PreK-12
- Gloucester County Special Services School District – Special Services
- Gloucester County Vocational-Technical School District – Vocational
- Greenwich Township School District – K-8
- Harrison Township School District – PreK-6
- Kingsway Regional School District – Regional
- Logan Township School District – PreK-8
- Mantua Township School District – PreK-6
- Monroe Township Public Schools – PreK-12
- National Park School District – PreK-6
- Paulsboro Public Schools – PreK-12
- Pitman School District – PreK-12
- South Harrison Township School District – PreK-6
- Swedesboro-Woolwich School District – PreK-6
- Washington Township Public School District – K-12
- Wenonah School District – K-6
- West Deptford Public Schools – PreK-12
- Westville School District – PreK-6
- Woodbury Public Schools – PreK-12
- Woodbury Heights School District – PreK-6
- Newfield Borough School District - Non-operating

== Hudson County ==
- Bayonne School District – PreK-12
- East Newark School District – PreK-8
- Guttenberg Public School District – PreK-8
- Harrison Public Schools – PreK-12
- Hoboken Public Schools – PreK-12
- Hudson County Schools of Technology – Vocational
- Jersey City Public Schools – PreK-12
- Kearny School District – PreK-12
- North Bergen School District – PreK-12
- Secaucus Public Schools – PreK-12
- Union City School District – PreK-12
- Weehawken School District – PreK-12
- West New York School District – PreK-12

== Hunterdon County ==
- Alexandria Township School District
- Bethlehem Township School District
- Bloomsbury School District
- Califon School District
- Clinton-Glen Gardner School District (renamed from Clinton Public School as of 2009)
- Clinton Township School District
- Delaware Township School District
- Delaware Valley Regional High School - Regional
- East Amwell Township School District
- Flemington-Raritan Regional School District - Regional
- Franklin Township School District
- Frenchtown School District
- Hampton School District
- High Bridge School District
- Holland Township School District
- Hunterdon Central Regional High School - Regional
- Hunterdon County Vocational School District
- Kingwood Township School District
- Lebanon Borough School District
- Lebanon Township Schools
- Milford Borough School District
- North Hunterdon-Voorhees Regional High School District - Regional
- Readington Township Public Schools
- South Hunterdon Regional School District - Regional, established in 2014–15 from the following former districts:
  - Lambertville City School District
  - Stockton Borough School District
  - West Amwell Township School District
- Tewksbury Township Schools
- Union Township School District

== Mercer County ==
- East Windsor Regional School District - Regional
- Ewing Public Schools
- Hamilton Township School District
- Hopewell Valley Regional School District - Regional
- International Academy of Trenton School District
- Lawrence Township Public Schools
- Mercer County Special Services School District
- Mercer County Technical Schools
- Princeton Public Schools
- Robbinsville Public School District
- Trenton Public Schools
- West Windsor-Plainsboro Regional School District - Regional (serving communities in both Mercer and Middlesex counties)

== Middlesex County ==
- Carteret School District
- Cranbury School District
- Dunellen Public Schools
- East Brunswick Public Schools
- Edison Township Public Schools
- Highland Park Public Schools
- Jamesburg Public Schools
- Metuchen School District
- Middlesex Board of Education
- Middlesex County Vocational and Technical Schools
- Milltown Public Schools
- Monroe Township School District
- New Brunswick Public Schools
- North Brunswick Township Public Schools
- Old Bridge Township Public Schools
- Perth Amboy Public Schools
- Piscataway Township Schools
- Sayreville Public Schools
- South Amboy Public Schools
- South Brunswick Public Schools
- South Plainfield Public Schools
- South River Public Schools
- Spotswood Public Schools
- Woodbridge Township School District

== Monmouth County ==
- Asbury Park Public Schools
- Atlantic Highlands School District
- Avon School District
- Belmar School District
- Bradley Beach School District
- Brielle School District
- Colts Neck School District
- Deal School District
- Eatontown Public Schools
- Fair Haven Public Schools
- Farmingdale School District
- Freehold Borough Schools
- Freehold Regional High School District – Regional
- Freehold Township Schools
- Hazlet Township Public Schools
- Henry Hudson Regional High School – Regional
- Highlands School District
- Holmdel Township Public Schools
- Howell Township Public Schools
- Keansburg School District
- Keyport Public Schools
- Little Silver School District
- Long Branch Public Schools
- Manalapan-Englishtown Regional School District – Regional
- Manasquan Public Schools
- Marlboro Township Public School District
- Matawan-Aberdeen Regional School District – Regional
- Middletown Township Public School District
- Millstone Township Schools
- Monmouth Beach School District
- Monmouth County Vocational School District
- Monmouth Regional High School – Regional
- Neptune City School District
- Neptune Township Schools
- Ocean Township School District – Consolidated
- Oceanport School District
- Red Bank Borough Public Schools
- Red Bank Regional High School – Regional
- Roosevelt Public School District
- Rumson School District
- Rumson-Fair Haven Regional High School – Regional
- Sea Girt School District
- Shore Regional High School – Regional
- Shrewsbury Borough School District
- Spring Lake School District
- Spring Lake Heights School District
- Tinton Falls School District – Regional
- Union Beach School System
- Upper Freehold Regional School District – Regional
- Wall Township Public Schools
- West Long Branch Public Schools
- Allenhurst School District - Non-operating
- Interlaken School District - Non-operating
- Lake Como School District - Non-operating
- Loch Arbour School District - Non-operating

== Morris County ==
- Boonton Public Schools
- Boonton Township School District
- Butler Public Schools
- School District of the Chathams – Regional
- Chester School District – Consolidated
- Denville Township School District
- Dover School District
- East Hanover School District
- Florham Park School District
- Hanover Park Regional High School District – Regional
- Hanover Township Public Schools
- Harding Township School District
- Jefferson Township Public Schools
- Kinnelon Public Schools
- Lincoln Park Public Schools
- Long Hill Township School System
- Madison Public Schools
- Mendham Borough Schools
- Mendham Township Public Schools
- Mine Hill School District
- Montville Township School District
- Morris County Vocational School District
- Morris Hills Regional District – Regional 9–12
- Morris Plains Schools
- Morris School District – Regional
- Mount Arlington School District
- Mount Olive Township School District
- Mountain Lakes Schools
- Netcong School District
- Parsippany-Troy Hills School District
- Pequannock Township School District
- Randolph Township Schools
- Riverdale School District
- Rockaway Borough Public Schools
- Rockaway Township Public Schools
- Roxbury School District
- Washington Township Schools
- West Morris Regional High School District – Regional
- Wharton Borough School District

== Ocean County ==
- Barnegat Township School District
- Bay Head School District
- Beach Haven School District
- Berkeley Township School District
- Brick Public Schools - PreK-12
- Central Regional School District – Regional
- Eagleswood Township School District
- Island Heights School District
- Jackson School District
- Lacey Township School District
- Lakehurst School District
- Lakewood School District
- Lavallette School District
- Little Egg Harbor Township School District
- Long Beach Island Consolidated School District – Consolidated
- Manchester Township School District
- Ocean County Vocational Technical School
- Ocean Gate School District
  - In spring 2026 the elementary school will close, and the school district will become a non-operating school district. The district established a five year agreement with the Berkeley Township School District so that district would educate students in Ocean Gate.
- Ocean Township School District
- Pinelands Regional School District – Regional
- Plumsted Township School District
- Point Pleasant Beach School District
- Point Pleasant School District
- Seaside Heights School District
- Seaside Park School District
- Southern Regional School District – Regional
- Stafford Township School District
- Toms River Regional Schools – Regional
- Tuckerton School District
- Seaside Park Borough School District - Non-operating

== Passaic County ==
- Bloomingdale School District
- Clifton Public Schools
- Haledon School District
- Hawthorne Public Schools
- Lakeland Regional High School - Regional
- Little Falls Township Public Schools
- Manchester Regional High School - Regional
- North Haledon School District
- Passaic City School District
- Passaic County Vocational School District
- Passaic Valley Regional High School
- Paterson Public Schools
- Pompton Lakes School District
- Prospect Park School District
- Ringwood Public School District
- Totowa Borough Public Schools
- Wanaque Borough Schools
- Wayne Public Schools
- West Milford Township Public Schools
- Woodland Park School District

== Salem County ==
- Alloway Township School District
- Elsinboro Township School District
- Lower Alloways Creek Township School District
- Mannington Township School District
- Oldmans Township School District
- Penns Grove-Carneys Point Regional School District – Regional
- Pennsville School District
- Pittsgrove Township School District
- Quinton Township School District
- Salem City School District
- Salem County Special Services School District
- Salem County Vocational Technical Schools
- Upper Pittsgrove School District
- Woodstown-Pilesgrove Regional School District – Regional

== Somerset County ==
- Bedminster Township School District
- Bernards Township School District
- Bound Brook School District
- Branchburg Township School District
- Bridgewater-Raritan Regional School District – Regional
- Franklin Township Public Schools
- Green Brook School District
- Hillsborough Township School District
- Manville School District
- Montgomery Township School District
- North Plainfield School District
- Somerset County Vocational and Technical School District
- Somerset Hills School District - Regional
- Somerville Public Schools
- South Bound Brook School District
- Warren Township Schools
- Watchung Borough Schools
- Watchung Hills Regional High School - Regional

== Sussex County ==
- Andover Regional School District – Regional
- Byram Township School District
- Frankford Township School District
- Franklin Borough School District
- Fredon Township School District
- Green Township School District
- Hamburg School District
- Hampton Township School District
- Hardyston Township School District
- High Point Regional High School – Regional
- Hopatcong Public Schools
- Kittatinny Regional High School – Regional
- Lafayette Township School District
- Lenape Valley Regional High School – Regional
- Montague Township School District
- Newton Public School District
- Ogdensburg Borough School District
- Sandyston-Walpack Consolidated School District – Consolidated
- Sparta Township Public School District
- Stanhope Public Schools
- Stillwater Township School District
- Sussex County Vocational School District
- Sussex-Wantage Regional School District – Regional
- Vernon Township School District
- Wallkill Valley Regional High School – Regional

== Union County ==
- Berkeley Heights Public Schools
- Clark Public School District
- Cranford Township Public Schools
- Elizabeth Public Schools
- Garwood Public Schools
- Hillside Public Schools
- Kenilworth Public Schools
- Linden Public Schools
- Mountainside School District
- New Providence School District
- Plainfield Public School District
- Rahway Public Schools
- Roselle Public Schools
- Roselle Park School District
- Scotch Plains-Fanwood Regional School District - Regional
- Springfield Public Schools
- Summit Public Schools
- Union County Vocational Technical Schools
- Union Public School District
- Westfield Public Schools
- Winfield Township School District

== Warren County ==
- Allamuchy Township School District
- Alpha School District
- Belvidere School District
- Blairstown Township School District
- Franklin Township School District
- Frelinghuysen Township School District
- Great Meadows Regional School District - Regional
- Greenwich Township School District
- Hackettstown School District
- Harmony Township School District
- Hope Township School District
- Knowlton Township School District
- Lopatcong Township School District
- Mansfield Township School District
- North Warren Regional High School - Regional
- Oxford Township School District
- Phillipsburg School District
- Pohatcong Township School District
- Warren County Special Services School District
- Warren County Vocational School District
- Warren Hills Regional School District - Regional
- Washington Borough Public Schools
- Washington Township School District
- White Township School District

== Former districts ==
Former non-operating school districts closed in 2009:

- Pemberton Borough (Burlington County)
- Audubon Park (Camden County)
- Tavistock (Camden County)
- Shiloh Borough (Cumberland County)
- Glen Gardner (Hunterdon County)
- Helmetta (Middlesex County)
- Sea Bright Borough (Monmouth County)
- Victory Gardens (Morris County)
- Mantoloking (Ocean County)
- Millstone (Somerset County)
- Rocky Hill (Somerset County)
- Branchville Borough (Sussex County)
- Hardwick (Warren County)

Former non-operating district closed in 2010: Teterboro

Elmer School District became a non-operating school district in 2010, and disestablished completely in 2017.
