= Mercer High School =

Mercer High School or Mercer County High School may refer to:

- Mercer County High School (Illinois), in Aledo, Illinois — formed by the merger of Aledo High School and Westmer High School in 2009 and uses the team name "the Golden Eagles"
- Mercer County Senior High School (Kentucky) in Harrodsburg, Kentucky — formed by the merger of Harrodsburg High School and Mercer County High School in 2006 and uses the team name "the Titans"
- Mercer High School (Missouri), in Mercer, Mercer County, Missouri — operated by the North Mercer R-III School District, and uses the team name "the Cardinals"
- Mercer County Junior-Senior High School (New Jersey), also known Mercer Junior Senior High School, in Hamilton, Mercer County, New Jersey — operated by Mercer County Special Services School District
- Mercer County Performing Arts High School in Trenton, Mercer County, New Jersey — operated by the Mercer County Technical School District
- Mercer High School (Tennessee) in Mercer, Madison County, Tennessee — merged to form South Side High School in Jackson, Tennessee in 1956
- Mercer Area Middle-High School, also known as Mercer Area Junior/Senior High School, in Mercer, Mercer County, Pennsylvania — uses the team name "the Mustangs"
- Mercer Island High School in Mercer Island, King County, Washington — uses the team name "the Islanders"
- Mercer School (Wisconsin) in Mercer, Iron County, Wisconsin — includes Mercer Environmental Tourism Charter School and other high school, and uses the team name "the Tigers"
