= Ocean Gate School District =

School District in Ocean County, New Jersey, US

Address
- 126 West Arverne Avenue Ocean Gate, Ocean County, New Jersey, 08740; United States
- Coordinates: 39.9241°N 74.1439°W

District information
- Grades: PreK-6
- Established: 1914
- Superintendent: Douglas Corbett
- Business administrator: Kevin O'Shea
- Schools: 1

Students and staff
- Enrollment: 142 (as of 2024–25)
- Faculty: 17.3 FTEs
- Student–teacher ratio: 8.2:1

Other information
- District Factor Group: B
- Website: www.oceangateschool.net
Ind.	Per pupil	District spending	Rank (*)	K-6 average	%± vs. average
1A	Total Spending	$18,718	36	$18,891	−0.9%
1	Budgetary Cost	16,589	48	13,649	21.5%
2	Classroom Instruction	10,600	53	8,366	26.7%
6	Support Services	2,342	32	2,161	8.4%
8	Administrative Cost	1,763	39	1,467	20.2%
10	Operations & Maintenance	1,615	34	1,552	4.1%
13	Extracurricular Activities	25	17	39	−35.9%
16	Median Teacher Salary	49,120	6	57,437
Data from NJDoE 2014 Taxpayers' Guide to Education Spending. *Of K-6 districts with any number of students. Lowest spending=1; Highest=59

Ocean Gate School District is a community public school district that serves students in pre-kindergarten through sixth grade from Ocean Gate in Ocean County, in the U.S. state of New Jersey.

As of the 2024–25 school year, the district, comprised of one school, had an enrollment of 142 students and 17.3 classroom teachers (on an FTE basis), for a student–teacher ratio of 8.2:1. In the 2016–17 school year, Ocean Gate was tied as having the 26th smallest enrollment of any school district in the state, with 149 students.

Public school students in seventh through twelfth grades attend the schools of the Central Regional School District, which serves students from Ocean Gate and from the municipalities of Berkeley Township, Island Heights, Seaside Heights and Seaside Park. Schools in the high school district (with 2024–25 enrollment data from the National Center for Education Statistics) are Central Regional Middle School with 680 students in grades 7–8 and Central Regional High School with 1,489 students in grades 9–12. The high school district's board of education consists of nine members, who are directly elected by the residents of the constituent municipalities to three-year terms of office on a staggered basis, with three seats up for election each year. Ocean Gate is allocated one of the board's nine seats.

== History ==
The district was established in 1914 with a one-room schoolhouse.

The district had been classified by the New Jersey Department of Education as being in District Factor Group "B", the second-lowest of eight groupings. District Factor Groups organize districts statewide to allow comparison by common socioeconomic characteristics of the local districts. From lowest socioeconomic status to highest, the categories are A, B, CD, DE, FG, GH, I and J.

State aid to the district dropped from $951,000 in 2019–20 to $367,000 in 2025–26. In January 2026 the enrollment was 149, a 13% increase from the 2019–20 school year. In January 2026, the district had a proposal for a 27% tax increase as an effort to fill a $700,000 budget shortfall that would allow the district to continue directly operating a school. By a more than 2–1 margin, residents voted down the proposal to increase taxes by $636 per year on the average home. On March 3, 2026, the board of trustees voted to close the school.

The elementary school will close at the end of the 2025–26 school year, and the school district will become a non-operating school district. The district established a five-year sending agreement with the Berkeley Township School District to educate students from Ocean Gate. Students in grades pre-kindergarten through 4 were zoned to H&M Potter School while students in grades 5-6 would be sent to Berkeley Township Elementary School.

== Schools ==
- Ocean Gate Elementary School had an enrollment of 141 students in grades PreK–6 as of the 2024–25 school year.
  - Irene Marousis, interim principal

== Administration ==
Core members of the district's administration are:

- Douglas Corbett, superintendent
- Kevin O'Shea, business administrator and board secretary

== Board of education ==
The district's board of education, comprised of five members, sets policy and oversees the fiscal and educational operation of the district through its administration. As a Type II school district, the board's trustees are elected directly by voters to serve three-year terms of office on a staggered basis, with either one or two seats up for election each year held (since 2012) as part of the November general election. The board appoints a superintendent to oversee the district's day-to-day operations and a business administrator to supervise the business functions of the district.
