= Berkeley Township School District =

School district in New Jersey, US

Address
- 53 Central Parkway Bayville, Ocean County, New Jersey, 08721; United States
- Coordinates: 39.891435°N 74.165491°W

District information
- Grades: Pre-K to 6
- Superintendent: James D. Rosselli
- Business administrator: Tyler A. Verga
- Schools: 4

Students and staff
- Enrollment: 2,385 (as of 2024–25)
- Faculty: 206.0 FTEs
- Student–teacher ratio: 11.6:1

Other information
- District Factor Group: B
- Website: www.btboe.org
Ind.	Per pupil	District spending	Rank (*)	K-6 average	%± vs. average
1A	Total Spending	$17,239	27	$18,891	−8.7%
1	Budgetary Cost	13,692	22	13,649	0.3%
2	Classroom Instruction	7,894	15	8,366	−5.6%
6	Support Services	1,888	18	2,161	−12.6%
8	Administrative Cost	1,732	38	1,467	18.1%
10	Operations & Maintenance	1,959	46	1,552	26.2%
13	Extracurricular Activities	8	5	39	−79.5%
16	Median Teacher Salary	56,141	27	57,437
Data from NJDoE 2014 Taxpayers' Guide to Education Spending. *Of K-6 districts with any number of students. Lowest spending=1; Highest=59

The Berkeley Township School District is a community public school district that is responsible for the education of children in pre-kindergarten through sixth grade from Berkeley Township, in Ocean County, in the U.S. state of New Jersey.

As of the 2024–25 school year, the district, comprised of four schools, had an enrollment of 2,385 students and 206.0 classroom teachers (on an FTE basis), for a student–teacher ratio of 11.6:1.

Public school students in seventh through twelfth grades attend the schools of the Central Regional School District, which serves students from Berkeley Township and from the municipalities of Island Heights, Ocean Gate, Seaside Heights and Seaside Park. Schools in the high school district (with 2024–25 enrollment data from the National Center for Education Statistics) are Central Regional Middle School with 680 students in grades 7–8 and Central Regional High School with 1,489 students in grades 9–12. The high school district's board of education consists of nine members, who are directly elected by the residents of the constituent municipalities to three-year terms of office on a staggered basis, with three seats up for election each year. Berkeley Township is allocated five of the board's nine seats.

== History ==
The district had been classified by the New Jersey Department of Education as being in District Factor Group "B", the second-lowest of eight groupings. District Factor Groups organize districts statewide to allow comparison by common socioeconomic characteristics of the local districts. From lowest socioeconomic status to highest, the categories are A, B, CD, DE, FG, GH, I and J.

In March 2026, the board of trustees of the Ocean Gate School District voted to close the school; the elementary school will close at the end of the 2025–26 school year, and the school district will become a non-operating school district. The district established a five-year sending agreement with the Berkeley Township School District to educate students from Ocean Gate. Students in grades pre-kindergarten through 4 were zoned to H&M Potter School while students in grades 5-6 would be sent to Berkeley Township Elementary School.

== Schools ==
Schools in the district (with 2024–25 enrollment data from the National Center for Education Statistics) are:

Grade PreK–4 schools

- Bayville Elementary School with 475 students in grades PreK–4
  - Steven Rieder, principal
- H. & M. Potter Elementary School with 627 students in grades PreK–4
  - Effective fall 2026, it will become the zoned school for students from Ocean Gate.
  - Andrea Cimino, principal
- Clara B. Worth Elementary School with 666 students in grades PreK–4
  - Cara Burton, principal

Grade 5-6 schools

- Berkeley Township Elementary School with 594 students in grades 5–6
  - Daniel Prima, principal

== Administration ==
Core members of the district's administration are:

- James D. Roselli, superintendent
- Tyler A Verga, business administrator and board secretary

== Board of education ==
The district's board of education, comprised of nine members, sets policy and oversees the fiscal and educational operation of the district through its administration. As a Type II school district, the board's trustees are elected directly by voters to serve three-year terms of office on a staggered basis, with either three or four seats up for election each year held (since 2012) as part of the November general election. The board appoints a superintendent to oversee the district's day-to-day operations and a business administrator to supervise the business functions of the district.
