= Suicide of Adriana Kuch =

2023 suicide

Adriana Olivia Kuch was a 14-year-old student at Central Regional High School in Bayville, New Jersey who committed suicide on February 3, 2023 after a video was shared across her school of her being attacked by four classmates.

On February 10, 2023, three students were charged with third degree felony assault, and one was charged with disorderly conduct.

A walkout was staged on February 8, 2023, to protest bullying at her school. A memorial for her was held on February 10, 2023, at the Mastapeter Memorial Home.

== Incident ==
On February 1, 2023, Adriana was filmed walking in the hallway with her boyfriend when she was jumped and repeatedly struck in the face with a water bottle by a female student. Adriana collapsed to the floor, and the girl proceeded to beat her by pulling her hair and striking her in the head. Off camera, at least two kids could be heard cheering on the assault.

Two school employees broke up the assault and Adriana was sent to the nurse as she blacked out and had severe bruises.

The video was then posted online where Adriana experienced cyberbullying.

== Reactions ==
Michael Kuch, Adriana's father expressed outrage that police were not called despite Adriana having bruises and having blacked out.

The school superintendent said in a statement "It is a tragedy and our thoughts and prayers go out to the family.". He later disclosed the student's personal information and blamed the student's death on her "poor decisions" including her family situation and marijuana use. He later resigned due to these comments. Adriana's father responded to his comments by describing him as a "piece of shit".

== Aftermath ==
The suicide of Adriana Kuch led many families, students, advocates and lawmakers to call for more state intervention into bullying and harassment. Some state lawmakers and parents advocated for legislation requiring assaults that cause injury to be reported to law enforcement. Lawmakers proposed "Adriana's Law" which would make the sharing of bullying videos illegal.

A walkout was held by parents and students on February 8, 2023, to protest bullying at the school.

The Central Regional School District wrote in a statement that it was "evaluating all current and past allegations of bullying" and "The District has contacted the Department of Education and will undergo an independent assessment of the District's anti-bullying policies and ensure every necessary safeguard is in place to protect our students and staff."

The family of Adriana Kuch filed a lawsuit against the Central Regional Board of Education alleging that officials were aware of "a culture of violence at Central Regional High School" and failed to protect her.
