= Ocean Gate, New Jersey =

Borough in Ocean County, New Jersey, US

- Borough
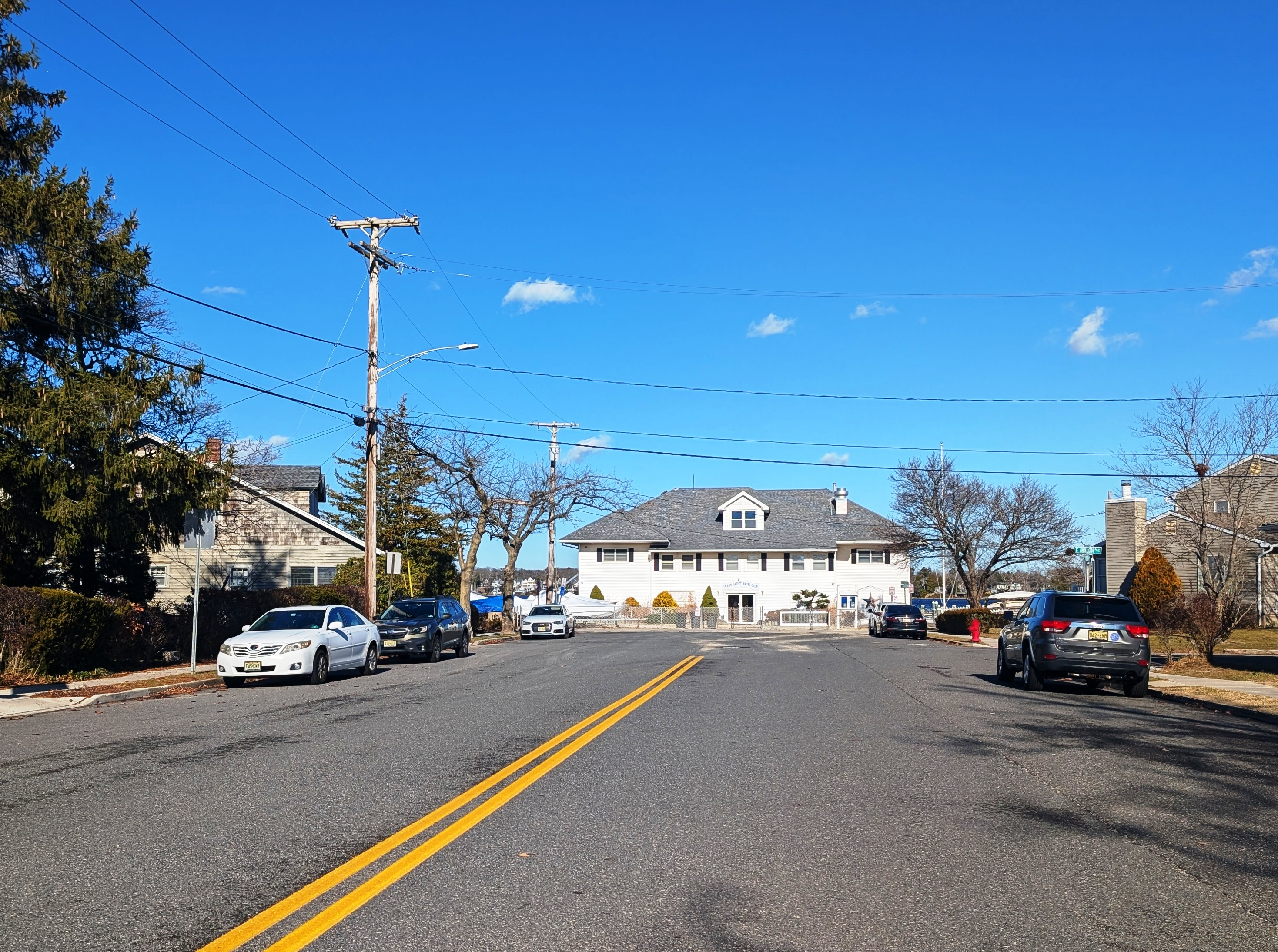
- Ocean Gate Yacht Club

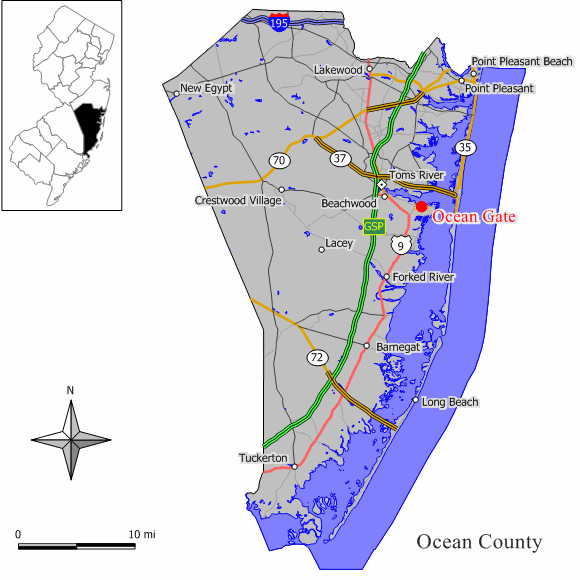
- Location of Ocean Gate in Ocean County highlighted in yellow (right). Inset map: Location of Ocean County in New Jersey highlighted in black (left).

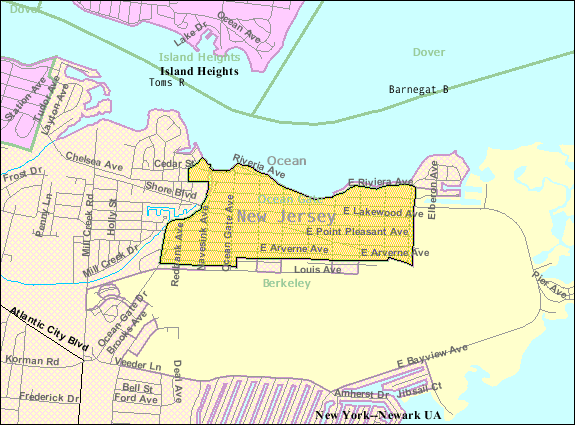
- Census Bureau map of Ocean Gate, New Jersey

- Location in Ocean County Location in New Jersey Location in the United States
- Coordinates: 39.9265°N 74.1348°W
- Country: United States
- State: New Jersey
- County: Ocean
- Incorporated: February 28, 1918

Government
  - Type: Borough
  - Body: Borough Council
  - Mayor: Robert Curtin (R, term ends December 31, 2026)
  - Municipal clerk: Ileana Vazquez-Gallipoli

Area
  - Total: 0.54 sq mi (1.41 km^{2})
  - Land: 0.45 sq mi (1.17 km^{2})
  - Water: 0.093 sq mi (0.24 km^{2}) 17.22%
  - Rank: 544th of 565 in state 33rd of 33 in county
- Elevation: 7 ft (2.1 m)

Population (2020)
  - Total: 1,932
  - Estimate (2023): 1,991
  - Rank: 488th of 565 in state 22nd of 33 in county
  - Density: 4,294.1/sq mi (1,658.0/km^{2})
  - Rank: 144th of 565 in state 3rd of 33 in county
- Time zone: UTC−05:00 (Eastern (EST))
  - Summer (DST): UTC−04:00 (Eastern (EDT))
- ZIP Code: 08740
- Area code: 732 exchanges: 237, 269, 606
- FIPS code: 3402954450
- GNIS feature ID: 885333
- Website: www.oceangatenjgov.com

Ocean Gate is a borough in Ocean County, in the U.S. state of New Jersey. As of the 2020 United States census, the borough's population was 1,932, a decrease of 79 (−3.9%) from the 2010 census count of 2,011, which in turn reflected a decline of 65 (−3.1%) from the 2,076 counted in the 2000 census.

== History ==
Trains operated to the area by Pennsylvania Railroad served what was called "Good Luck Point", with visitors building cottages that were the start of the community that became Ocean Gate. AT&T operated a shortwave radio transmitting station after purchasing 175 acres (71 ha) in 1929.

The borough of Ocean Gate was incorporated by an act of the New Jersey Legislature on February 28, 1918, from portions of Berkeley Township. An additional portion of Berkeley Township was annexed on February 28, 1953.

== Geography ==
According to the United States Census Bureau, the borough had a total area of 0.54 square miles (1.41 km^{2}), including 0.45 square miles (1.17 km^{2}) of land and 0.09 square miles (0.24 km^{2}) of water (17.22%).

The borough is bordered by the Ocean County municipality of Berkeley Township.

The borough, including its northern half, is one of 11 municipalities in Ocean County that are part of the Toms River watershed.

== Demographics ==
Historical population
Census	Pop.	Note	%±
1920	69		—
1930	174		152.2%
1940	242		39.1%
1950	452		86.8%
1960	706	*	56.2%
1970	1,081		53.1%
1980	1,385		28.1%
1990	2,078		50.0%
2000	2,076		−0.1%
2010	2,011		−3.1%
2020	1,932		−3.9%
2023 (est.)	1,991	▲	3.1%
Population sources: 1920 1920–1930; 1940–2000 2000; 2010 2020 * = Gained territory in previous decade.

=== 2010 census ===
The 2010 United States census counted 2,011 people, 832 households, and 534 families in the borough. The population density was 4,490.3 inhabitants per square mile (1,733.7/km^{2}). There were 1,203 housing units at an average density of 2,686.1 per square mile (1,037.1/km^{2}). The racial makeup was 95.18% (1,914) White, 1.34% (27) Black or African American, 0.05% (1) Native American, 0.20% (4) Asian, 0.00% (0) Pacific Islander, 2.09% (42) from other races, and 1.14% (23) from two or more races. Hispanic or Latino of any race were 6.36% (128) of the population.

Of the 832 households, 27.6% had children under the age of 18; 40.5% were married couples living together; 17.2% had a female householder with no husband present and 35.8% were non-families. Of all households, 28.6% were made up of individuals and 10.3% had someone living alone who was 65 years of age or older. The average household size was 2.42 and the average family size was 2.98.

22.2% of the population were under the age of 18, 8.3% from 18 to 24, 26.3% from 25 to 44, 29.7% from 45 to 64, and 13.5% who were 65 years of age or older. The median age was 40.1 years. For every 100 females, the population had 92.6 males. For every 100 females ages 18 and older there were 89.2 males.

The Census Bureau's 2006–2010 American Community Survey showed that (in 2010 inflation-adjusted dollars) median household income was $61,250 (with a margin of error of +/− $9,978) and the median family income was $73,056 (+/− $23,241). Males had a median income of $61,932 (+/− $6,721) versus $43,295 (+/− $6,037) for females. The per capita income for the borough was $29,770 (+/− $4,691). About 2.2% of families and 6.3% of the population were below the poverty line, including 11.3% of those under age 18 and 5.2% of those age 65 or over.

=== 2000 census ===
As of the 2000 United States census there were 2,076 people, 832 households, and 546 families residing in the borough. The population density was 4,749.0 inhabitants per square mile (1,833.6/km^{2}). There were 1,152 housing units at an average density of 2,635.3 per square mile (1,017.5/km^{2}). The racial makeup of the borough was 96.53% White, 0.96% African American, 0.14% Native American, 0.96% Asian, 0.53% from other races, and 0.87% from two or more races. Hispanic or Latino of any race were 2.36% of the population.

There were 832 households, out of which 32.6% had children under the age of 18 living with them, 44.0% were married couples living together, 16.2% had a female householder with no husband present, and 34.3% were non-families. 28.1% of all households were made up of individuals, and 11.1% had someone living alone who was 65 years of age or older. The average household size was 2.50 and the average family size was 3.06.

In the borough the population was spread out, with 26.0% under the age of 18, 7.0% from 18 to 24, 32.2% from 25 to 44, 20.3% from 45 to 64, and 14.5% who were 65 years of age or older. The median age was 37 years. For every 100 females, there were 88.9 males. For every 100 females age 18 and over, there were 82.2 males.

The median income for a household in the borough was $41,067, and the median income for a family was $50,847. Males had a median income of $33,558 versus $30,919 for females. The per capita income for the borough was $19,239. About 7.6% of families and 10.3% of the population were below the poverty line, including 12.0% of those under age 18 and 4.3% of those age 65 or over.

== Government ==
=== Local government ===
Ocean Gate is governed under the borough form of New Jersey municipal government, which is used in 218 municipalities (of the 564) statewide, making it the most common form of government in New Jersey. The governing body is comprised of the mayor and the borough council, with all positions elected at-large on a partisan basis as part of the November general election. The mayor is elected directly by the voters to a four-year term of office. The borough council includes six members elected to serve three-year terms on a staggered basis, with two seats coming up for election each year in a three-year cycle. The borough form of government used by Ocean Gate is a "weak mayor / strong council" government in which council members act as the legislative body with the mayor presiding at meetings and voting only in the event of a tie. The mayor can veto ordinances subject to an override by a two-thirds majority vote of the council. The mayor makes committee and liaison assignments for council members, and most appointments are made by the mayor with the advice and consent of the council.

As of 2022, the mayor of Ocean Gate is Republican David Kendrick, whose term of office ends December 31, 2022. Members of the Borough Council are Council President Mark Haug (R, 2023), Bruce Cox (R, 2024;appointed to serve an unexpired term), Robert Livingston (R, 2022), Joella Nicastro (R, 2022), Laura Padham-Iaria (R, 2024) and Mildred Sheppard (R, 2023).

In April 2020, after then-mayor Paul J. Kennedy was charged with official misconduct related to theft of borough-owned property that had been taking place for five years, the borough council cut the mayor's salary down from $50,000 to one dollar After Kennedy resigned from the seat expiring in December 2022, the borough council appointed David Kendrick to fill the vacant mayoral seat; in turn, Bruce Cox was appointed to fill Kendrick's vacated council seat that expires in December 2024.

Democrats Rose Kindon and Chris Theodos replaced Frank Santarpia and James McGrath, who resigned in February 2014 in protest over an increase in the mayor's compensation to $50,000. The mayor was later cited and fined for ethics violation by the NJ State Local Finance Board for illegally accepting pay as a municipal employee while he was serving as mayor.

=== Federal, state, and county representation ===
Ocean Gate is located in the 4th Congressional District and is part of New Jersey's 9th state legislative district.

For the 119th United States Congress, New Jersey's 4th congressional district is represented by Chris Smith (R, Manchester Township). New Jersey is represented in the United States Senate by Democrats Cory Booker (Newark, term ends 2027) and Andy Kim (Moorestown, term ends 2031).

For the 2026–2027 session, the 9th legislative district of the New Jersey Legislature is represented in the State Senate by Carmen Amato (R, Berkeley Township) and in the General Assembly by Greg Myhre (R, Stafford Township) and Brian E. Rumpf (R, Little Egg Harbor Township).

Ocean County is governed by a Board of County Commissioners composed of five members who are elected on an at-large basis in partisan elections and serving staggered three-year terms of office, with either one or two seats coming up for election each year as part of the November general election. At an annual reorganization held in the beginning of January, the board chooses a director and a deputy director from among its members. As of 2025, Ocean County's Commissioners (with party affiliation, term-end year and residence) are:

John P. Kelly (R, 2025, Eagleswood Township), Virginia E. Haines (R, 2025, Toms River), Robert Arace (R, Manchester Township, 2027) Jennifer Bacchione (R, Berkeley Township, 2027) and Frank Sadeghi (R, 2026, Toms River).

Constitutional officers elected on a countywide basis are: Clerk Scott M. Colabella (R, 2025, Barnegat Light), Sheriff Michael G. Mastronardy (R, 2025; Toms River) and Surrogate Jeffrey Moran (R, 2028, Beachwood).

=== Politics ===
Gubernatorial election results for Ocean Gate
Year	Republican		Democratic		Third party(ies)	
Year	No.	%	No.	%	No.	%
2025	493	57.59%	359	41.94%	4	0.47%
2021	455	63.90%	250	35.11%	7	0.98%
2017	376	61.24%	220	35.83%	18	2.93%
2013	458	70.90%	177	27.40%	11	1.70%
2009	420	61.31%	214	31.24%	51	7.45%
2005	356	51.67%	294	42.67%	39	5.66%

As of March 2011, there were a total of 1,287 registered voters in Ocean Gate, of which 336 (26.1%) were registered as Democrats, 387 (30.1%) were registered as Republicans and 563 (43.7%) were registered as Unaffiliated. There was one voter registered to another party. Among the borough's 2010 Census population, 64.0% (vs. 63.2% in Ocean County) were registered to vote, including 82.2% of those ages 18 and over (vs. 82.6% countywide).

Presidential Elections Results
Year	Republican	Democratic	Third Parties
2024	60.5% 662	36.8% 403	2.7% 23
2020	56.6% 621	40.6% 446	2.3% 30
2016	59.1% 554	36.0% 338	4.9% 46
2012	50.4% 415	47.9% 395	1.7% 14
2008	52.7% 504	44.5% 426	2.0% 19
2004	53.4% 506	44.9% 425	0.7% 9

In the 2013 gubernatorial election, Republican Chris Christie received 70.9% of the vote (458 cast), ahead of Democrat Barbara Buono with 27.4% (177 votes), and other candidates with 1.7% (11 votes), among the 664 ballots cast by the borough's 1,264 registered voters (18 ballots were spoiled), for a turnout of 52.5%. In the 2009 gubernatorial election, Republican Chris Christie received 60.3% of the vote (420 ballots cast), ahead of Democrat Jon Corzine with 30.7% (214 votes), Independent Chris Daggett with 5.9% (41 votes) and other candidates with 1.4% (10 votes), among the 697 ballots cast by the borough's 1,284 registered voters, yielding a 54.3% turnout.

United States Senate election results for Ocean Gate1
Year	Republican		Democratic		Third party(ies)	
Year	No.	%	No.	%	No.	%
2024	584	55.89%	447	42.78%	14	1.34%
2018	457	59.12%	289	37.39%	27	3.49%
2012	399	50.51%	365	46.20%	26	3.29%
2006	370	54.90%	281	41.69%	23	3.41%

United States Senate election results for Ocean Gate2
Year	Republican		Democratic		Third party(ies)	
Year	No.	%	No.	%	No.	%
2020	590	56.03%	443	42.07%	20	1.90%
2014	357	51.89%	310	45.06%	21	3.05%
2013	232	55.90%	175	42.17%	8	1.93%
2008	437	49.38%	420	47.46%	28	3.16%

== Education ==
The Ocean Gate School District is a public school district that serves students in pre-kindergarten through sixth grade at Ocean Gate Elementary School. As of the 2024–25 school year, the district, comprised of one school, had an enrollment of 142 students and 17.3 classroom teachers (on an FTE basis), for a student–teacher ratio of 8.2:1. In the 2016–17 school year, Ocean Gate was tied as having the 26th smallest enrollment of any school district in the state, with 149 students.

After voters rejected by a more than 2–1 margin a proposal to address a $700,000 budgetary shortfall with a 27% tax increase the board of trustees voted in March 2026 to close the school. The elementary school will close at the end of the 2025–26 school year, and the school district will become a non-operating school district. The district established a five-year sending agreement with the Berkeley Township School District to educate students from Ocean Gate. Students in grades pre-kindergarten through 4 were zoned to H&M Potter School while students in grades 5-6 would be sent to Berkeley Township Elementary School.

Public school students in seventh through twelfth grades attend the schools of the Central Regional School District, which serves students from Ocean Gate and from the municipalities of Berkeley Township, Island Heights, Seaside Heights and Seaside Park. Schools in the high school district (with 2024–25 enrollment data from the National Center for Education Statistics) are Central Regional Middle School with 680 students in grades 7–8 and Central Regional High School with 1,489 students in grades 9–12. The high school district's board of education consists of nine members, who are directly elected by the residents of the constituent municipalities to three-year terms of office on a staggered basis, with three seats up for election each year. Ocean Gate is allocated one of the board's nine seats.

== Transportation ==
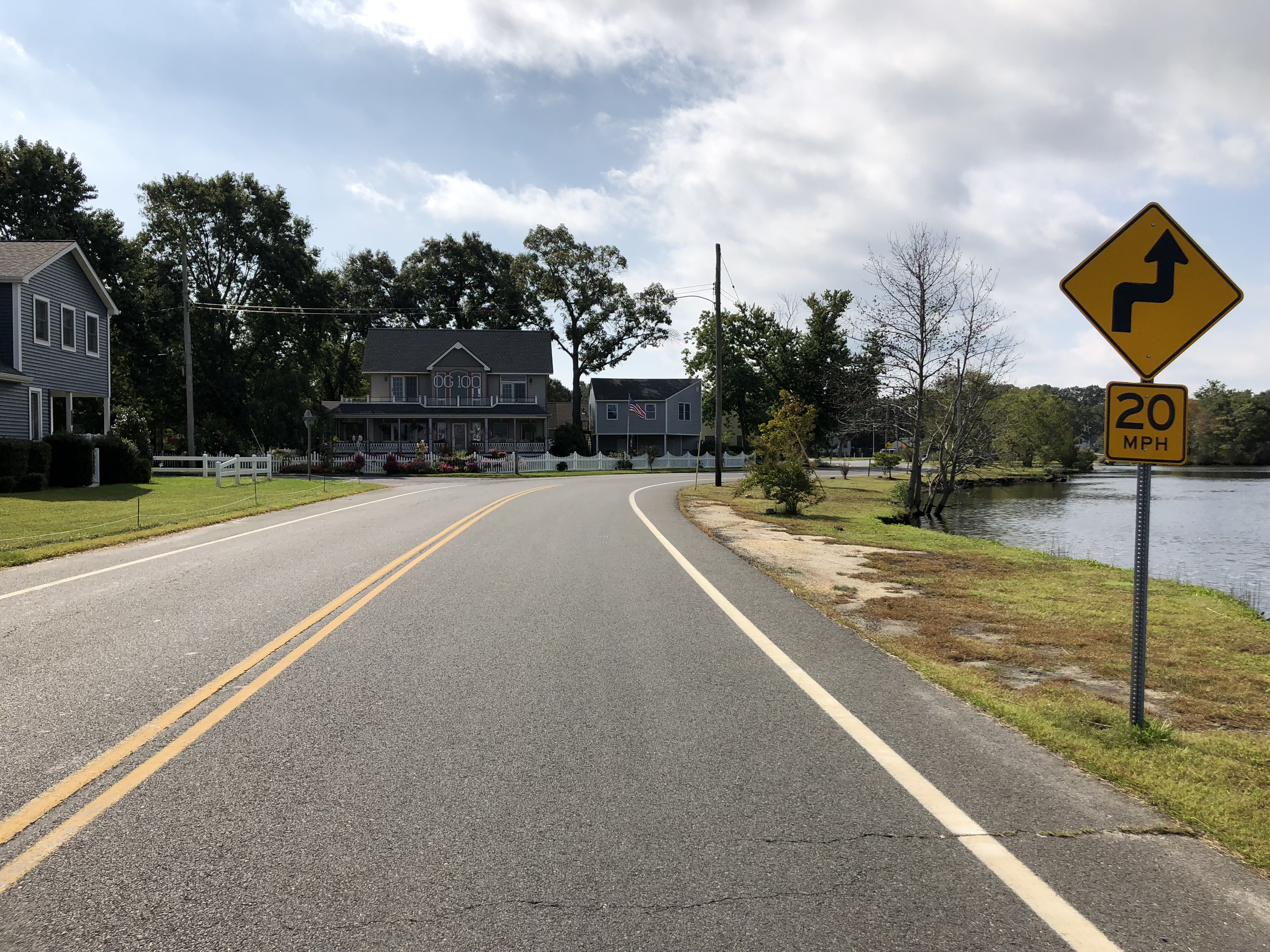
County Route 625 (Ocean Gate Drive) southbound in Ocean Gate

As of May 2010, the borough had a total of 12.30 miles (19.79 km) of roadways, of which 2.56 miles (4.12 km) were maintained by the municipality and 9.74 miles (15.68 km) by Ocean County.

No Interstate, U.S. or state highways serve Ocean Gate. The main roads serving the borough are minor county roads, such as County Route 625.
