= Somerset County Vocational and Technical High School =

High school in Somerset County, New Jersey, US

Location
- 14 Vogt Drive; Bridgewater Township, Somerset County, New Jersey 08807; United States; 40.58886°N 74.608709°W

Information
- Type: Vocational public high school
- School district: Somerset County Vocational and Technical School District
- NCES School ID: 341506005278
- Principal: Michael Meyer
- Faculty: 57.4 FTEs
- Grades: 9-12
- Enrollment: 353 (as of 2023–24)
- Student to teacher ratio: 6.2:1
- Colors: Navy Blue and Gold
- Athletics conference: New Jersey Technical Interscholastic League
- Team name: Jaguars
- Website: www.scvths.org

The Somerset County Vocational and Technical High School (SCVTHS) is a fully accredited, four-year vocational public high school located on an 80-acre (320,000 m^{2}) campus in Bridgewater Township, in Somerset County, in the U.S. state of New Jersey. The school is part of the Somerset County Vocational and Technical School District, which serves students in ninth through twelfth grades from all of Somerset County. The school offers over 20 different programs, on both a full-time and part-time basis, that combine training in occupational and academic skills.

As of the 2023–24 school year, the school had an enrollment of 353 students and 57.4 classroom teachers (on an FTE basis), for a student–teacher ratio of 6.2:1. There were 38 students (10.8% of enrollment) eligible for free lunch and 8 (2.3% of students) eligible for reduced-cost lunch.

Full-time students earn both a high school diploma and a vocational certificate in their specific specialty area. Part-time students earn a certificate from SCVTHS in their specialty area, and receive an academic education at their home district. Starting with the 2009-10 school year, full-time students have a college track option for their academic classes.

== Awards, recognition and rankings ==
Schooldigger.com ranked the school as 74th out of 416 public high schools statewide in its 2019 rankings (an increase of 29 positions from the 2018 ranking) based on test scores from the NJSLA English Language Arts, Algebra I, Geometry, and Algebra II exams.

== Academic programs ==
=== Gifted and Talented Performing Arts Program ===
Somerset Vo-Tech offers a rigorous performing arts program that divides into two branches: Acting and Acting with Vocal Music. All Theater Arts Majors at SCVTHS are taught by the guidelines of Sanford Meisner. The program is very competitive as it is known to only hold about 50 students (grades 9-12) total. The Theater Department produces one main-stage production each year in the fall.

=== Academy for Health and Medical Sciences ===
The Academy for Health and Medical Sciences is a program offered as a "school within a school" as a partnership between the high school and Raritan Valley Community College. In this program, students earn up to 64 college credits from the college, graduating with a high school diploma from SCVTHS as well as an associate's degree from the college.

== Athletics ==
The Somerset County Vo-Tech Jaguars compete independently with interscholastic sports operating under the supervision of the New Jersey State Interscholastic Athletic Association (NJSIAA). With 372 students in grades 10-12, the school was classified by the NJSIAA for the 2019–20 school year as Group I for most athletic competition purposes, which included schools with an enrollment of 75 to 476 students in that grade range.

== Notable alumni ==
- Alex Abrahantes (born 1977), professional wrestler, manager and on-air television personality.
