= Pamela Boyd =

American handball player

Personal information
- Full name: Pamela Joan Boyd-Petroski
- Nationality: American
- Born: 27 September 1955 (age 70) Atlantic City, New Jersey, U.S.

Sport
- Sport: Handball

Pamela Joan Boyd-Petroski (born September 27, 1955) is an American former handball player who competed in the 1984 Summer Olympics.

Boyd graduated in 1974 from Central Regional High School, where she played both basketball and field hockey. She was inducted into the school's Golden Eagles Athletics Hall of Fame in 2012.

Boyd now teaches physical education at Pinelands Regional High School in Tuckerton, New Jersey.
