= Steven Doyle =

Edward Steven Doyle (born 1959) was President of the United States Chess Federation from 1984 to 1987, the youngest person ever to be elected to that position. He is a chess tournament organizer, who is best known for organizing the annual U.S. Amateur Team East Championship which is held every February in Parsippany, New Jersey and is the biggest single-section tournament held in the US.

Steve also served for twenty years as an officer of the New Jersey State Chess Federation. He is a past president of the NJSCF.

In addition, Steve authored a weekly chess column for The Star-Ledger for 30 years.

From 1996 to 2006, he was a Vice President of FIDE. He is the only living American to be an Honorary Member of FIDE.

Doyle holds an MBA and has been a senior officer at two fortune 50 companies. From Chief Financial Officer to President of a major division at both Prudential and Aetna.

Doyle also serves on many charitable boards from the Island Heights Sailing Foundation to the Peto Museum. He supports the visual and performing arts throughout New Jersey and New York City.

He was the founding President of the US Chess Hall of Fame located in St Louis.

He has served as the mayor of Island Heights, New Jersey.
