= Salem County Special Services School District =

School district in New Jersey, United States

Salem County Special Services District
- 880 Route 45 Woodstown, Salem County, New Jersey, 08098

District information
- Grades: Special Services
- Superintendent: Jack Swain
- Business administrator: John Bolil
- Schools: 3

Students and staff
- Enrollment: 177 (as of 2023–24)
- Faculty: 33.9 FTEs
- Student–teacher ratio: 5.2:1

Other information
- Website: www.scsssd.org
| Ind. | Per pupil | District spending | Rank (*) | Spec. svcs. average | %± vs. average |
|---|---|---|---|---|---|
| 1A | Total Spending | $35,077 | 1 | $18,891 | 85.7% |
| 1 | Budgetary Cost | 43,828 | 3 | 57,252 | −23.4% |
| 2 | Classroom Instruction | 26,099 | 3 | 32,861 | −20.6% |
| 6 | Support Services | 3,268 | 1 | 11,945 | −72.6% |
| 8 | Administrative Cost | 10,063 | 8 | 5,725 | 75.8% |
| 10 | Operations & Maintenance | 4,372 | 2 | 6,215 | −29.7% |
| 16 | Median Teacher Salary | 52,201 | 1 | 77,183 |
Data from NJDoE 2014 Taxpayers' Guide to Education Spending. *Of Spec. svcs. districts with any number of students. Lowest spending=1; Highest=8

Salem County Special Services School District logo

The Salem County Special Services School District is a school district in Salem County, in the U.S. state of New Jersey, serving students with disabilities from Salem and Cumberland Counties. The district operates Cumberland Campus, located in Bridgeton, Salem Campus in Woodstown and Daretown School in Elmer. The district also operates programs in Upper Pittsgrove School in conjunction with the Upper Pittsgrove School District and Alternative High/Middle School programs.

As of the 2023–24 school year, the district, comprised of three schools, had an enrollment of 177 students and 33.9 classroom teachers (on an FTE basis), for a student–teacher ratio of 5.2:1.

== Schools ==
Schools in the district (with 2023–24 enrollment data from the National Center for Education Statistics) are:

- Cumberland Campus with 101 students in grades PreK–12
  - Brian Cummings, principal
- Daretown School with 27 students in grades PreK–12
  - Rebecca Cruz-Guy, principal
- Salem Campus with 49 students in grades K–12
  - James Helder, principal

== Administration ==
Core members of the district's administration are:

- John R. Swain, superintendent of schools
- Frank H. Maurer III, business administrator and board secretary

== Board of education ==
The district's board of education sets policy and oversee the fiscal and educational operation of the district through its administration. The board is composed of seven members, the county superintendent of schools, who serves on an ex officio basis, and six members who are appointed by the Salem County Board of County Commissioners to three-year terms of office on a staggered basis, with two member terms up for reappointment and expiring each year. The board appoints a superintendent to oversee the district's day-to-day operations and a business administrator to supervise the business functions of the district.
