= Somerset County Vocational and Technical School District =

Vocational School District in Somerset County, New Jersey, US

Somerset County Vocational & Technical

Address
- 14 Vogt Drive Bridgewater Township, Somerset County, New Jersey, 08807; United States
- Coordinates: 40.58886°N 74.608709°W

District information
- Grades: Vocational
- Superintendent: Robert Presuto
- Business administrator: Raelene Sipple
- Schools: 1

Students and staff
- Enrollment: 322 (as of 2022–23)
- Faculty: 59.4 FTEs
- Student–teacher ratio: 5.4:1

Other information
- Website: www.scvths.org
Ind.	Per pupil	District spending	Rank (*)	Vocational average	%± vs. average
1A	Total Spending	$28,194	20	$18,891	49.2%
1	Budgetary Cost	21,307	20	17,296	23.2%
2	Classroom Instruction	10,320	18	9,045	14.1%
6	Support Services	3,032	19	2,269	33.6%
8	Administrative Cost	3,473	18	2,353	47.6%
10	Operations & Maintenance	4,218	18	3,014	39.9%
13	Extracurricular Activities	213	6	464	−54.1%
16	Median Teacher Salary	60,665	10	65,035
Data from NJDoE 2014 Taxpayers' Guide to Education Spending. *Of Vocational districts with any number of students. Lowest spending=1; Highest=21

The Somerset County Vocational and Technical School District is a comprehensive vocational public school district serving the vocational and training needs of high school students in ninth through twelfth grades along with adults from Somerset County, in the U.S. state of New Jersey.

As of the 2022–23 school year, the district, comprised of one school, had an enrollment of 322 students and 59.4 classroom teachers (on an FTE basis), for a student–teacher ratio of 5.4:1.

== School ==
Schools in the district (with 2021–22 enrollment data from the National Center for Education Statistics) are:

- Somerset County Vocational and Technical High School, an accredited four-year high school located on an 80-acre (32 ha) campus in Bridgewater Township with 365 students in grades 9–12.
  - Diane Ziegler, principal

== Administration ==
Core members of the district's administration are:

- Robert Presuto, superintendent
- Raelene Sipple, business administrator and board secretary

== Board of education ==
The district's board of education is composed of five members. The county executive superintendent of schools serves on an ex officio basis, along with four members who are appointed by the Somerset County Board of County Commissioners. The appointed members serve four-year terms of office on a staggered basis, with one seat up for reappointment each year. The board appoints a superintendent to oversee the district's day-to-day operations and a business administrator to supervise the business functions of the district.
