= Freehold Township Schools =

School district in Monmouth County, New Jersey, US

Address
- 384 West Main Street Freehold Township, Monmouth County, New Jersey, 07728; United States
- Coordinates: 40.242256°N 74.301378°W

District information
- Grades: PreK-8
- Superintendent: Neal Dickstein
- Business administrator: Robert DeVita
- Schools: 8

Students and staff
- Enrollment: 3,447 (as of 2022–23)
- Faculty: 372.3 FTEs
- Student–teacher ratio: 9.3:1

Other information
- District Factor Group: GH
- Website: www.freeholdtwp.k12.nj.us
Ind.	Per pupil	District spending	Rank (*)	K-8 average	%± vs. average
1A	Total Spending	$17,912	55	$18,891	−5.2%
1	Budgetary Cost	15,696	74	14,159	10.9%
2	Classroom Instruction	9,460	69	8,659	9.3%
6	Support Services	2,517	68	2,167	16.2%
8	Administrative Cost	1,534	39	1,547	−0.8%
10	Operations & Maintenance	1,888	70	1,612	17.1%
13	Extracurricular Activities	98	45	104	−5.8%
16	Median Teacher Salary	57,755	22	61,136
Data from NJDoE 2014 Taxpayers' Guide to Education Spending. *Of K-8 districts with more than 750 students. Lowest spending=1; Highest=84

The Freehold Township Schools serve students in pre-kindergarten through eighth grade from Freehold Township, in Monmouth County, in the U.S. state of New Jersey.

As of the 2022–23 school year, the district, comprised of eight schools, had an enrollment of 3,447 students and 372.3 classroom teachers (on an FTE basis), for a student–teacher ratio of 9.3:1.

The district is classified by the New Jersey Department of Education as being in District Factor Group "GH", the third-highest of eight groupings. District Factor Groups organize districts statewide to allow comparison by common socioeconomic characteristics of the local districts. From lowest socioeconomic status to highest, the categories are A, B, CD, DE, FG, GH, I and J.

Students in ninth through twelfth grades attend either Freehold Township High School or Freehold High School, as part of the Freehold Regional High School District, with school assignment based on their home address. The district also serves students from Colts Neck Township, Englishtown, Farmingdale, Freehold Borough, Howell Township, Manalapan Township and Marlboro Township. Freehold Township High School is home to the Contemporary Global Studies Learning Center and Freehold High School hosts the Medical Sciences Learning Center; each program admits students on a selective basis from all over the Freehold Regional High School District. As of the 2022–23 school year, Freehold Township High School had an enrollment of 1,926 students and 130.0 classroom teachers (on an FTE basis), for a student–teacher ratio of 14.8:1, while Freehold Borough High School had an enrollment of 1,409 students and 97.8 classroom teachers (on an FTE basis), for a student–teacher ratio of 14.4:1.

== Schools ==
Schools in the district (with 2022–23 enrollment data from the National Center for Education Statistics) are:

Elementary schools

- Early Childhood Learning Center with 104 students in PreK.
  - Laura Cecilione, principal
- C. Richard Applegate Elementary School with 377 students in grades K–5. The school is named for Charles Richard Applegate.
  - Bradley Millaway, principal
- Joseph J. Catena Elementary School with 426 students in grades K–5. The school is named for Joseph J. Catena, their first principal, who served for 38 years. It was built in 1961 and is the oldest school in Freehold that is still being used as an elementary school.
  - Traci Shaw, principal
- Laura Donovan Elementary School with 454 students in grades K–5. Built in 1968, the school was named in honor of Laura Donovan who taught in Freehold Township for 54 years.
  - Jennifer Benbrook, principal
- Marshall W. Errickson Elementary School with 453 students in grades K–5. Marshall Errickson School was built in 1972. Errickson is split between Eisenhower and Barkalow.
  - Cathleen Areman, principal
- West Freehold Elementary School with 456 students in grades K–5. WFS was the first school in the district. It started out as a one room schoolhouse, around the turn-of-the century, located on Wemrock Road, which was before the establishment of the district. In 1936, the WFS was incorporated into the school district was opened on Stilwells Corner Road, next to the present-day Barkalow Middle School. It had gone through many additions and renovations over the next 70 years, to accommodate the growing population. In 2004, The New West Freehold School was built, and many students were re-districted to go to this school. The first graduating class of 2005 buried a time capsule for future generations. The Old West Freehold School went through another renovation, to incorporate the Early Childhood Learning Center (ECLC) and the district's offices.
  - Tara Lechner, principal

Middle schools

- Clifton T. Barkalow Middle School with 605 students in grades 6–8, gets most students in Laura Donovan and West Freehold. Barkalow was the first middle school in the district when it was built in 1964.
  - Anne Kuras, principal
- Dwight D. Eisenhower Middle School with 578 students in grades 6–8, gets most students from Applegate and Catena. It first opened its doors in 1971. It is located directly next door to the Joseph J. Catena School.
  - Lori Gambino, principal

== Administration ==
Core members of the district's administration are:

- Neal Dickstein, superintendent
- Robert DeVita, business administrator and board secretary

== Board of education ==
The district's board of education, comprised of nine members, sets policy and oversees the fiscal and educational operation of the district through its administration. As a Type II school district, the board's trustees are elected directly by voters to serve three-year terms of office on a staggered basis, with three seats up for election each year held (since 2012) as part of the November general election. The board appoints a superintendent to oversee the district's day-to-day operations and a business administrator to supervise the business functions of the district.
