= Mannington Township School District =

School district in Salem County, New Jersey, US

Address
- 495 Route 45 Mannington Township, Salem County, New Jersey, 08079; United States
- Coordinates: 39.600664°N 75.423608°W

District information
- Grades: PreK-8
- Superintendent: Kristin Williams
- Business administrator: Karen Stoms
- Schools: 1

Students and staff
- Enrollment: 163 (as of 2023–24)
- Faculty: 19.0 FTEs
- Student–teacher ratio: 8.6:1

Other information
- District Factor Group: CD
- Website: www.manningtonschool.org
Ind.	Per pupil	District spending	Rank (*)	K-8 average	%± vs. average
1A	Total Spending	$18,744	38	$18,891	−0.8%
1	Budgetary Cost	14,071	23	14,159	−0.6%
2	Classroom Instruction	9,226	35	8,659	6.5%
6	Support Services	1,797	17	2,167	−17.1%
8	Administrative Cost	1,596	32	1,547	3.2%
10	Operations & Maintenance	1,374	16	1,612	−14.8%
13	Extracurricular Activities	6	3	104	−94.2%
16	Median Teacher Salary	60,950	50	61,136
Data from NJDoE 2014 Taxpayers' Guide to Education Spending. *Of K-8 districts with up to 400 students. Lowest spending=1; Highest=71

The Mannington Township School District is a community public school district that serves students in pre-kindergarten through eighth grade from Mannington Township, in Salem County, in the U.S. state of New Jersey.

As of the 2023–24 school year, the district, comprised of one school, had an enrollment of 163 students and 19.0 classroom teachers (on an FTE basis), for a student–teacher ratio of 8.6:1.

Public school students in ninth through twelfth grades attend Salem High School in Salem City, together with students from Elsinboro Township, Lower Alloways Creek Township and Quinton Township, as part of a sending/receiving relationship with the Salem City School District. As of the 2023–24 school year, the high school had an enrollment of 387 students and 40.0 classroom teachers (on an FTE basis), for a student–teacher ratio of 9.7:1.

== History ==
In the 2016–17 school year, Mannington had the 31st smallest enrollment of any school district in the state, with 158 students.

The district had been classified by the New Jersey Department of Education as being in District Factor Group "CD", the sixth-highest of eight groupings. District Factor Groups organize districts statewide to allow comparison by common socioeconomic characteristics of the local districts. From lowest socioeconomic status to highest, the categories are A, B, CD, DE, FG, GH, I and J.

== School ==
The Mannington Township School had an enrollment of 161 students in grades PreK–8 during the 2021–22 school year.

== Administration ==
Core members of the district's administration are:

- Kristin Williams, superintendent Williams serves as chief school administrator of the Upper Pittsgrove School District as part of a shared services agreement.
- Karen Stoms, business administrator and board secretary

== Board of education ==
The district's board of education, comprised of seven members, sets policy and oversees the fiscal and educational operation of the district through its administration. As a Type II school district, the board's trustees are elected directly by voters to serve three-year terms of office on a staggered basis, with either two or three seats up for election each year held (since 2012) as part of the November general election. The board appoints a superintendent to oversee the district's day-to-day operations and a business administrator to supervise the business functions of the district.
