= River Vale Public Schools =

School district in Bergen County, New Jersey, US

Address
- 609 Westwood Avenue River Vale, Bergen County, New Jersey, 07675; United States
- Coordinates: 40.994°N 74.011°W

District information
- Grades: PreK-8
- Superintendent: Melissa Signore
- Business administrator: Kelly Ippolito
- Schools: 3

Students and staff
- Enrollment: 1,073 (as of 2020–21)
- Faculty: 94.2 FTEs
- Student–teacher ratio: 11.4:1

Other information
- District Factor Group: I
- Website: www.rivervaleschools.com
Ind.	Per pupil	District spending	Rank (*)	PreK-8 average	%± vs. average
1A	Total Spending	$17,315	43	$18,891	−8.3%
1	Budgetary Cost	14,528	48	14,159	2.6%
2	Classroom Instruction	8,321	32	8,659	−3.9%
6	Support Services	2,330	55	2,167	7.5%
8	Administrative Cost	1,957	79	1,547	26.5%
10	Operations & Maintenance	1,804	65	1,612	11.9%
13	Extracurricular Activities	116	61	104	11.5%
16	Median Teacher Salary	73,670	79	61,136
Data from NJDoE 2014 Taxpayers' Guide to Education Spending. *Of PreK-8 districts with more than 750 students. Lowest spending=1; Highest=84

The River Vale Public Schools is a comprehensive community public school district that serves students in pre-kindergarten through eighth grade in River Vale, Bergen County, in the U.S. state of New Jersey.

As of the 2020–21 school year, the district, comprising three schools, had an enrollment of 1,073 students and 94.2 classroom teachers (on an FTE basis), for a student–teacher ratio of 11.4:1.

The district is classified by the New Jersey Department of Education as being in District Factor Group "I", the second-highest of eight groupings. District Factor Groups organize districts statewide to allow comparison by common socioeconomic characteristics of the local districts. From lowest socioeconomic status to highest, the categories are A, B, CD, DE, FG, GH, I and J.

River Vale's public high school students attend Pascack Valley High School in Hillsdale, together with students from Hillsdale, as part of the Pascack Valley Regional High School District. As of the 2020–21 school year, the high school had an enrollment of 1,087 students and 93.2 classroom teachers (on an FTE basis), for a student–teacher ratio of 11.7:1.

== Awards and recognition ==
For the 2005–06 school year, the district was recognized with the "Best Practices Award" by the New Jersey Department of Education for its "Aloha Hawaii" Social Studies program at Roberge Elementary School.

Also during the 2005–06 school year, all three of the district's schools - Holdrum Middle School, Roberge Elementary School, and Woodside Elementary School - won the "National PTA Parent Involvement Award," a designation which lasts for three years. At the time, only three other schools in the state of New Jersey had been so named. Two Holdrum Middle School students, both Grade 7, were recognized in December 2008 for their participation in the Bergen County Middle School Chorus. Five Holdrum Middle School students, in grades 7 and 8, were recognized in December 2011 for their participation in the Bergen County Middle School Chorus, and one student, in Grade 7, was recognized for participation in the Bergen County Middle School Band.

During the 2011–12 school year, one of the district's middle school robotics teams was the overall champion at the Northern New Jersey Regional Qualifying Tournament, as well as at the New Jersey State Finals Championship Tournament. They qualified for the 2011 World Championship Festival.

During the 2012–13 school year, the robotics team repeated as regional and state champions. They are the only public school team to win the state championship twice.

== Schools ==
Schools in the district (with 2020–21 enrollment data from the National Center for Education Statistics) are:; Elementary schools

- Roberge Elementary School with 302 students in pre-kindergarten to fifth grade
  - Stephen A. Wren, principal
- Woodside Elementary School with 342 students in kindergarten to fifth grade
  - Justin Jasper, principal

Middle school

- Holdrum Middle School with 413 students in grades sixth to eighth
  - James P. Cody, principal

== Administration ==
Core members of the district's administration are:

- Melissa Signore, superintendent of schools
- Kelly Ippolito, business administrator and board secretary

== RVEF's A.C.E. Before and After School Program ==
The River Vale Educational Fund's Activity, Caring and Enrichment (A.C.E.) Before & After School Program is designed to supervise and care for the students of both of the elementary schools in the district, including those at Roberge and Woodside, as well as elementary schools in the surrounding communities of Hillsdale, Emerson and Norwood.

== Board of education ==
The district's board of education, comprised of seven members, sets policy and oversees the fiscal and educational operation of the district through its administration. As a Type II school district, the board's trustees are elected directly by voters to serve three-year terms of office on a staggered basis, with either two or three seats up for election each year held (since 2012) as part of the November general election. The board appoints a superintendent to oversee the district's day-to-day operations and a business administrator to supervise the business functions of the district.
