= Atlantic County Special Services School District =

School district in Atlantic County, New Jersey, US

Atlantic County Special Services District

Address
- 4805 Nawakwa Boulevard Mays Landing, Atlantic County, New Jersey, 08330; United States
- Coordinates: 39.441835°N 74.691108°W

District information
- Grades: Special svcs.
- Superintendent: Philip J. Guenther
- Business administrator: Nicholas Brown
- Schools: 2

Students and staff
- Enrollment: 294 (as of 2022–23)
- Faculty: 25.0 FTEs
- Student–teacher ratio: 11.8:1

Other information
- Website: acsssd.net
Ind.	Per pupil	District spending	Rank (*)	Special svcs. average	%± vs. average
1A	Total Spending	$55,032	4	$18,891	191.3%
1	Budgetary Cost	47,742	4	57,252	−16.6%
2	Classroom Instruction	27,809	4	32,861	−15.4%
6	Support Services	9,605	4	11,945	−19.6%
8	Administrative Cost	5,610	3	5,725	−2.0%
10	Operations & Maintenance	4,415	3	6,215	−29.0%
16	Median Teacher Salary	75,889	5	77,183
Data from NJDoE 2014 Taxpayers' Guide to Education Spending. *Of Special svcs. districts with any number of students. Lowest spending=1; Highest=8

The Atlantic County Special Services School District is a special education public school district located in the Mays Landing section of Hamilton Township, serving the educational needs of classified students ages 3 to 21 from Atlantic County, in the U.S. state of New Jersey.

As of the 2022–23 school year, the district, comprising two schools, had an enrollment of 294 students and 25.0 classroom teachers (on an FTE basis), for a student–teacher ratio of 11.8:1.

Sending districts in the county pay tuition for each student sent to one of the district's programs.

== Schools ==
Schools in the district (with 2022–23 enrollment data from the National Center for Education Statistics) are:

- Atlantic County Elementary and Middle Schools with 197 students in grades PreK-8
  - Brian Kern, principal
- Atlantic County High School with 97 students in grades 9-12
  - Tad Derenberger, principal

== Administration ==
Core members of the district's administration are:

- Philip J. Guenther, superintendent
- Nicholas Brown, business administrator / board secretary

== Board of education ==
The district's board of education is comprised of the county superintendent of schools and six public members who set policy and oversee the fiscal and educational operation of the district through its administration. As a Type I school district, the board's trustees are appointed to four-year terms of office by the Atlantic County Board of County Commissioners, along with the county superintendent of schools, who serves on an ex officio basis. The board appoints a superintendent to oversee the district's day-to-day operations and a business administrator to supervise the business functions of the district.
