= Island Heights, New Jersey =

Borough in Ocean County, New Jersey, US

- Borough
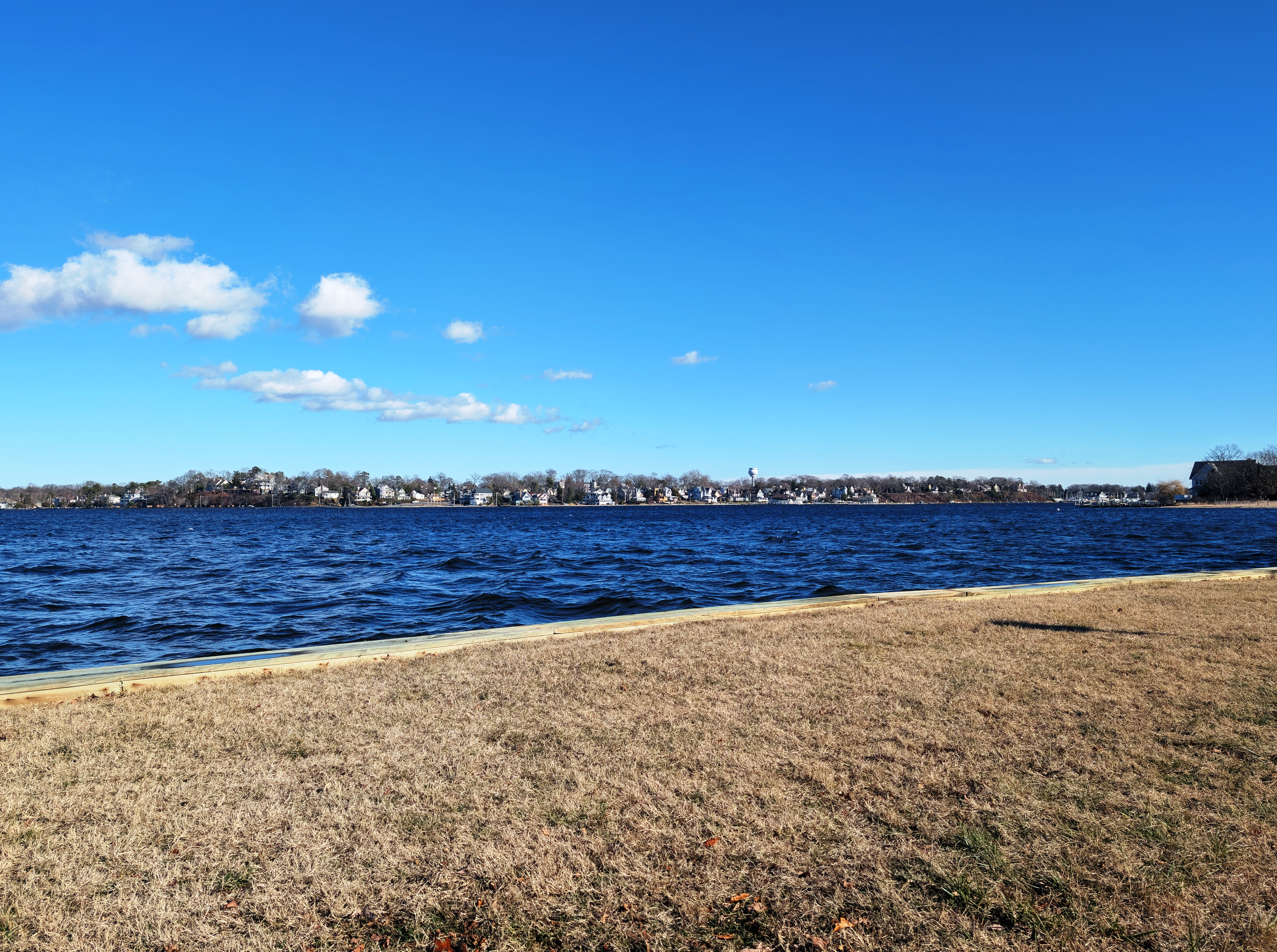
- View of Island Heights across Toms River from Pine Beach

- Seal

- Location of Island Heights in Ocean County highlighted in red (right). Inset map: Location of Ocean County in New Jersey highlighted in orange (left).

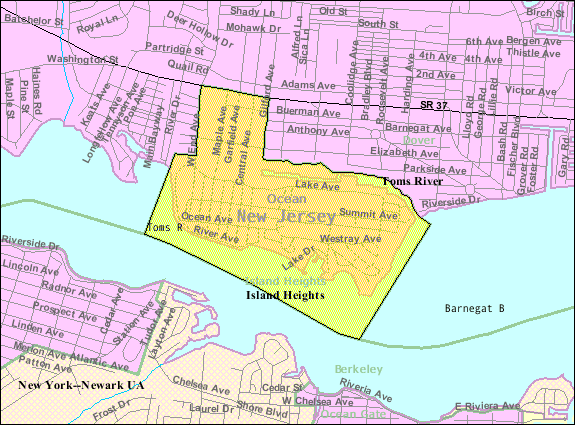
- Census Bureau map of Island Heights, New Jersey

- Location in Ocean County Location in New Jersey Location in the United States
- Coordinates: 39.941792°N 74.143814°W
- Country: United States
- State: New Jersey
- County: Ocean
- Incorporated: May 6, 1887

Government
  - Type: Faulkner Act (small municipality)
  - Body: Borough Council
  - Mayor: E. Steven Doyle (term ends December 31, 2026)
  - Municipal clerk: Sean Asay

Area
  - Total: 0.92 sq mi (2.38 km^{2})
  - Land: 0.61 sq mi (1.58 km^{2})
  - Water: 0.31 sq mi (0.80 km^{2}) 33.59%
  - Rank: 512th of 565 in state 27th of 33 in county
- Elevation: 36 ft (11 m)

Population (2020)
  - Total: 1,650
  - Estimate (2023): 1,699
  - Rank: 506th of 565 in state 25th of 33 in county
  - Density: 2,709.7/sq mi (1,046.2/km^{2})
  - Rank: 237th of 565 in state 11th of 33 in county
- Time zone: UTC−05:00 (Eastern (EST))
  - Summer (DST): UTC−04:00 (Eastern (EDT))
- ZIP Code: 08732
- Area code: 732
- FIPS code: 3402934530
- GNIS feature ID: 0885262
- Website: www.islandheightsborough.gov

Island Heights is a borough in Ocean County, in the U.S. state of New Jersey. As of the 2020 United States census, the borough's population was 1,650, a decrease of 23 (−1.4%) from the 2010 census count of 1,673, which in turn reflected a decline of 78 (−4.5%) from the 1,751 counted in the 2000 census.

The borough is a dry town where alcohol cannot legally be sold.

== History ==
Island Heights was incorporated as a borough by an act of the New Jersey Legislature on May 6, 1887, from portions of Dover Township (now Toms River Township), based on the results of a referendum held on November 18, 1886.

Island Heights takes its name from two sources: it originally was an island. It is situated by a steep bluff rising 60 feet (18 m) above the Toms River. It was originally known as Doctor Johnson's island, being included in the patent granted to him in 1680. In the century before the American Revolutionary War, it was known as Dillon's Island, probably for James Dillon, a prominent man in Toms River. The land was purchased by John Imlay of Allentown, who sold it in 1794 to Issac Gulick. In 1797, Gulick and his wife Abagail sold it to Abraham and George Parker. In 1799, the Parker brothers sold it to Abel Middleton of Upper Freehold Township.

Development of Island Heights began in 1878 when the Island Heights Association, a Methodist organization, was formed to establish a camp meeting site (similar to Ocean Grove). The first camp meeting was held in summer 1878, with 1,500 attending, followed by the development of cottages and the formal incorporation of the borough in 1887.

== Geography ==
According to the United States Census Bureau, the borough had a total area of 0.92 square miles (2.38 km^{2}), including 0.61 square miles (1.58 km^{2}) of land and 0.31 square miles (0.80 km^{2}) of water (33.59%).

Unincorporated communities, localities and place names located partially or completely within the borough include Long Point.

The borough borders the Ocean County municipalities of Berkeley Township and Toms River Township.

The borough is one of 11 municipalities in Ocean County that are part of the Toms River watershed.

== Demographics ==
Historical population
| Census | Pop. | Note | %± |
|---|---|---|---|
| 1880 | 34 | | — |
| 1890 | 271 | | 697.1% |
| 1900 | 316 | | 16.6% |
| 1910 | 313 | | −0.9% |
| 1920 | 194 | | −38.0% |
| 1930 | 453 | | 133.5% |
| 1940 | 392 | | −13.5% |
| 1950 | 795 | | 102.8% |
| 1960 | 1,150 | | 44.7% |
| 1970 | 1,397 | | 21.5% |
| 1980 | 1,575 | | 12.7% |
| 1990 | 1,470 | | −6.7% |
| 2000 | 1,751 | | 19.1% |
| 2010 | 1,673 | | −4.5% |
| 2020 | 1,650 | | −1.4% |
| 2023 (est.) | 1,699 | ▲ | 3.0% |
Population sources: 1880–1890; 1890–2000 1890–1920 1890; 1890–1910 1910–1930; 1940–2000 2000; 2010 2020

=== 2010 census ===
The 2010 United States census counted 1,673 people, 683 households, and 487 families in the borough. The population density was 2,738.3 per square mile (1,057.3/km^{2}). There were 831 housing units at an average density of 1,360.2 per square mile (525.2/km^{2}). The racial makeup was 95.82% (1,603) White, 0.24% (4) Black or African American, 0.12% (2) Native American, 1.37% (23) Asian, 0.00% (0) Pacific Islander, 0.36% (6) from other races, and 2.09% (35) from two or more races. Hispanic or Latino of any race were 2.39% (40) of the population.

Of the 683 households, 25.0% had children under the age of 18; 57.0% were married couples living together; 10.0% had a female householder with no husband present and 28.7% were non-families. Of all households, 22.0% were made up of individuals and 9.2% had someone living alone who was 65 years of age or older. The average household size was 2.45 and the average family size was 2.88.

18.5% of the population were under the age of 18, 7.0% from 18 to 24, 21.0% from 25 to 44, 35.9% from 45 to 64, and 17.6% who were 65 years of age or older. The median age was 47.0 years. For every 100 females, the population had 91.4 males. For every 100 females ages 18 and older there were 90.2 males.

The Census Bureau's 2006–2010 American Community Survey showed that (in 2010 inflation-adjusted dollars) median household income was $77,269 (with a margin of error of +/− $5,616) and the median family income was $96,458 (+/− $21,090). Males had a median income of $75,234 (+/− $7,830) versus $47,045 (+/− $11,606) for females. The per capita income for the borough was $39,493 (+/− $4,086). About 5.6% of families and 5.7% of the population were below the poverty line, including 7.8% of those under age 18 and 1.2% of those age 65 or over.

=== 2000 census ===
As of the 2000 United States census there were 1,751 people, 705 households, and 497 families residing in the borough. The population density was 2,909.2 inhabitants per square mile (1,123.2/km^{2}). There were 807 housing units at an average density of 1,340.8 per square mile (517.7/km^{2}). The racial makeup of the borough was 97.77% White, 0.11% African American, 0.46% Native American, 0.63% Asian, 0.06% from other races, and 0.97% from two or more races. Hispanic or Latino of any race were 1.37% of the population.

There were 705 households, out of which 28.8% had children under the age of 18 living with them, 57.0% were married couples living together, 10.5% had a female householder with no husband present, and 29.4% were non-families. 24.3% of all households were made up of individuals, and 9.8% had someone living alone who was 65 years of age or older. The average household size was 2.48 and the average family size was 2.97.

In the borough the population was spread out, with 22.4% under the age of 18, 6.6% from 18 to 24, 24.5% from 25 to 44, 29.2% from 45 to 64, and 17.3% who were 65 years of age or older. The median age was 43 years. For every 100 females, there were 92.8 males. For every 100 females age 18 and over, there were 87.4 males.

The median income for a household in the borough was $61,125, and the median income for a family was $72,596. Males had a median income of $47,500 versus $38,375 for females. The per capita income for the borough was $26,975. About 2.6% of families and 4.1% of the population were below the poverty line, including 3.5% of those under age 18 and 9.1% of those age 65 or over.

== Government ==
=== Local government ===
Island Heights is governed under the Faulkner Act form of municipal government, formally known as the Optional Municipal Charter Law, within the Small Municipality (Plan A), enacted by direct petition as of July 1, 1974. The borough is one of 18 municipalities (of the 564) statewide that use this form of government, which is available to municipalities with a population below 12,000 at the time of adoption. The governing body is comprised of the Mayor and the six-member Borough Council, whose members are elected in non-partisan elections held as part of the November general election. The mayor is directly elected to a four-year term of office. Councilmembers serve three-year terms of office on a staggered basis, with two seats coming up for election each year in a three-year cycle. As the result of an ordinance passed unanimously by the borough council in July 2011, the borough shifted its nonpartisan elections from May to November.

As of 2024, the Mayor of Island Heights Borough is E. Steve Doyle, whose term of office ends on December 31, 2026. Borough Council members are Council President Rolf Weber (2027), Robert Baxter (2025), Alan Fumo (2025), Brian Gabriel (2026), Lynn Pendleton (2026) and Sandi Healy (2027).

In May 2019, Lynn Pendleton was appointed to fill the seat expiring in December 2020 that had been held by Sean Asay until he resigned from office. Pendeton was elected in the November 2019 general election to serve the balance of the term of office.

Brian Taboada, who had been serving a term ending in December 2014, announced at an August 2013 council meeting that he would be stepping down from office to focus on school obligations.

==== Emergency services ====
The borough is protected by the Island Heights Volunteer Fire Company, which was established in 1895 and the Island Height Volunteer First Aid Squad established in 1950.

=== Federal, state, and county representation ===
Island Heights is located in the 4th Congressional District and is part of New Jersey's 10th state legislative district.

For the 119th United States Congress, New Jersey's 4th congressional district is represented by Chris Smith (R, Manchester Township). New Jersey is represented in the United States Senate by Democrats Cory Booker (Newark, term ends 2027) and Andy Kim (Moorestown, term ends 2031).

For the 2026–2027 session, the 10th legislative district of the New Jersey Legislature is represented in the State Senate by James W. Holzapfel (R, Toms River) and in the General Assembly by Paul Kanitra (R, Point Pleasant Beach) and Gregory P. McGuckin (R, Toms River).

Ocean County is governed by a Board of County Commissioners composed of five members who are elected on an at-large basis in partisan elections and serving staggered three-year terms of office, with either one or two seats coming up for election each year as part of the November general election. At an annual reorganization held in the beginning of January, the board chooses a director and a deputy director from among its members. As of 2025, Ocean County's Commissioners (with party affiliation, term-end year and residence) are:

John P. Kelly (R, 2025, Eagleswood Township), Virginia E. Haines (R, 2025, Toms River), Robert Arace (R, Manchester Township, 2027) Jennifer Bacchione (R, Berkeley Township, 2027) and Frank Sadeghi (R, 2026, Toms River).

Constitutional officers elected on a countywide basis are: Clerk Scott M. Colabella (R, 2025, Barnegat Light), Sheriff Michael G. Mastronardy (R, 2025; Toms River) and Surrogate Jeffrey Moran (R, 2028, Beachwood).

=== Politics ===
Presidential election results

United States presidential election results for Island Heights
| Year | Republican | | Democratic | | Third party(ies) | |
| Year | No. | % | No. | % | No. | % |
|---|---|---|---|---|---|---|
| 2024 | 643 | 54.31% | 525 | 44.34% | 16 | 1.35% |
| 2020 | 601 | 51.06% | 550 | 46.73% | 26 | 2.21% |
| 2016 | 534 | 52.61% | 433 | 42.66% | 48 | 4.73% |
| 2012 | 508 | 52.21% | 454 | 46.66% | 11 | 1.13% |
| 2008 | 558 | 53.04% | 469 | 44.58% | 25 | 2.38% |
| 2004 | 568 | 53.99% | 469 | 44.58% | 15 | 1.43% |
| 2000 | 467 | 56.95% | 353 | 43.05% | 0 | 0.00% |
| 1996 | 399 | 43.85% | 388 | 42.64% | 123 | 13.52% |
| 1992 | 416 | 45.32% | 298 | 32.46% | 204 | 22.22% |
| 1988 | 605 | 61.05% | 274 | 27.65% | 112 | 11.30% |
| 1984 | 631 | 73.46% | 212 | 24.68% | 16 | 1.86% |
| 1980 | 523 | 64.65% | 216 | 26.70% | 70 | 8.65% |
| 1976 | 434 | 61.04% | 277 | 38.96% | 0 | 0.00% |
| 1972 | 499 | 76.65% | 152 | 23.35% | 0 | 0.00% |
| 1968 | 351 | 58.70% | 174 | 29.10% | 73 | 12.21% |
| 1964 | 301 | 52.35% | 274 | 47.65% | 0 | 0.00% |
| 1960 | 417 | 73.29% | 152 | 26.71% | 0 | 0.00% |
| 1956 | 450 | 90.36% | 48 | 9.64% | 0 | 0.00% |
| 1952 | 406 | 89.82% | 46 | 10.18% | 0 | 0.00% |
| 1948 | 267 | 83.70% | 52 | 16.30% | 0 | 0.00% |
| 1944 | 32 | 14.61% | 187 | 85.39% | 0 | 0.00% |

Island Heights has been a largely Republican leaning jurisdiction in presidential elections. All GOP presidential candidates since 1948 have won the borough, with six of those campaigns breaking 70% of the vote. As of March 2011, there were a total of 1,329 registered voters in Island Heights, of which 285 (21.4%) were registered as Democrats, 415 (31.2%) were registered as Republicans and 629 (47.3%) were registered as Unaffiliated. There were no voters registered to other parties. Among the borough's 2010 Census population, 79.4% (vs. 63.2% in Ocean County) were registered to vote, including 97.4% of those ages 18 and over (vs. 82.6% countywide).

Gubernatorial election results for Island Heights
| Year | Republican | | Democratic | | Third party(ies) | |
| Year | No. | % | No. | % | No. | % |
|---|---|---|---|---|---|---|
| 2025 | 545 | 54.39% | 454 | 45.31% | 3 | 0.30% |
| 2021 | 497 | 57.32% | 361 | 41.64% | 9 | 1.04% |
| 2017 | 382 | 52.91% | 327 | 45.29% | 13 | 1.80% |
| 2013 | 459 | 67.50% | 205 | 30.15% | 16 | 2.35% |
| 2009 | 453 | 59.92% | 247 | 32.67% | 56 | 7.41% |
| 2005 | 396 | 49.13% | 372 | 46.15% | 38 | 4.71% |

In the 2013 gubernatorial election, Republican Chris Christie received 67.5% of the vote (459 cast), ahead of Democrat Barbara Buono with 30.1% (205 votes), and other candidates with 2.4% (16 votes), among the 703 ballots cast by the borough's 1,303 registered voters (23 ballots were spoiled), for a turnout of 54.0%. In the 2009 gubernatorial election, Republican Chris Christie received 59.8% of the vote (453 ballots cast), ahead of Democrat Jon Corzine with 32.6% (247 votes), Independent Chris Daggett with 6.5% (49 votes) and other candidates with 0.9% (7 votes), among the 757 ballots cast by the borough's 1,346 registered voters, yielding a 56.2% turnout.

United States Senate election results for Island Heights1
| Year | Republican | | Democratic | | Third party(ies) | |
| Year | No. | % | No. | % | No. | % |
|---|---|---|---|---|---|---|
| 2024 | 588 | 52.31% | 521 | 46.35% | 15 | 1.33% |
| 2018 | 494 | 55.88% | 360 | 40.72% | 30 | 3.39% |
| 2012 | 473 | 52.61% | 406 | 45.16% | 20 | 2.22% |
| 2006 | 379 | 51.01% | 339 | 45.63% | 25 | 3.36% |

United States Senate election results for Island Heights2
| Year | Republican | | Democratic | | Third party(ies) | |
| Year | No. | % | No. | % | No. | % |
|---|---|---|---|---|---|---|
| 2020 | 588 | 51.62% | 522 | 45.83% | 29 | 2.55% |
| 2014 | 298 | 50.17% | 277 | 46.63% | 19 | 3.20% |
| 2013 | 236 | 51.19% | 219 | 47.51% | 6 | 1.30% |
| 2008 | 536 | 54.81% | 418 | 42.74% | 24 | 2.45% |

== Historic district ==
- Island Heights Historic District
- U.S. National Register of Historic Places
- U.S. Historic district
- New Jersey Register of Historic Places
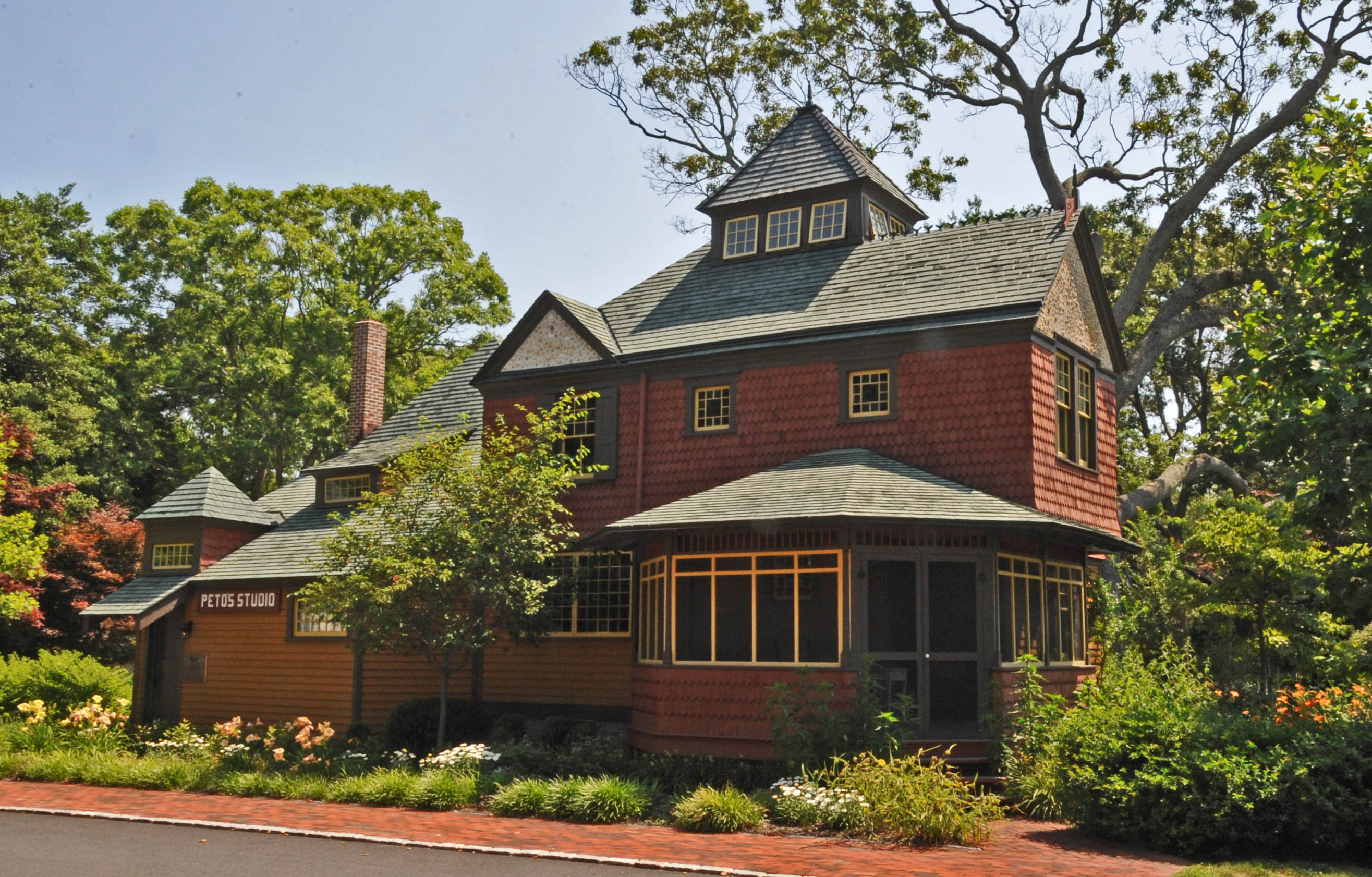
- John F. Peto's Studio
- Location: Roughly bounded by Toms River, Summit and River Avenues
- Area: 280 acres (110 ha)
- Architectural style: Queen Anne, Shingle Style, Gothic Revival
- NRHP reference No.: 82003290
- NJRHP No.: 2298

Significant dates
- Added to NRHP: July 8, 1982
- Designated NJRHP: February 23, 1981

The Island Heights Historic District is a 280-acre (110 ha) historic district roughly bounded by Toms River, Summit and River Avenues in the borough. It was added to the National Register of Historic Places on February 29, 1980, for its significance in architecture, recreation and religion. The district includes 244 contributing buildings. The artist John F. Peto's studio features Queen Anne style architecture and is now a museum. St. Gertrude's Mission Church originally had wooden shingles. The Grenley House is also known as the "Gingerbread House" and features elaborated scrollsawn woodwork.

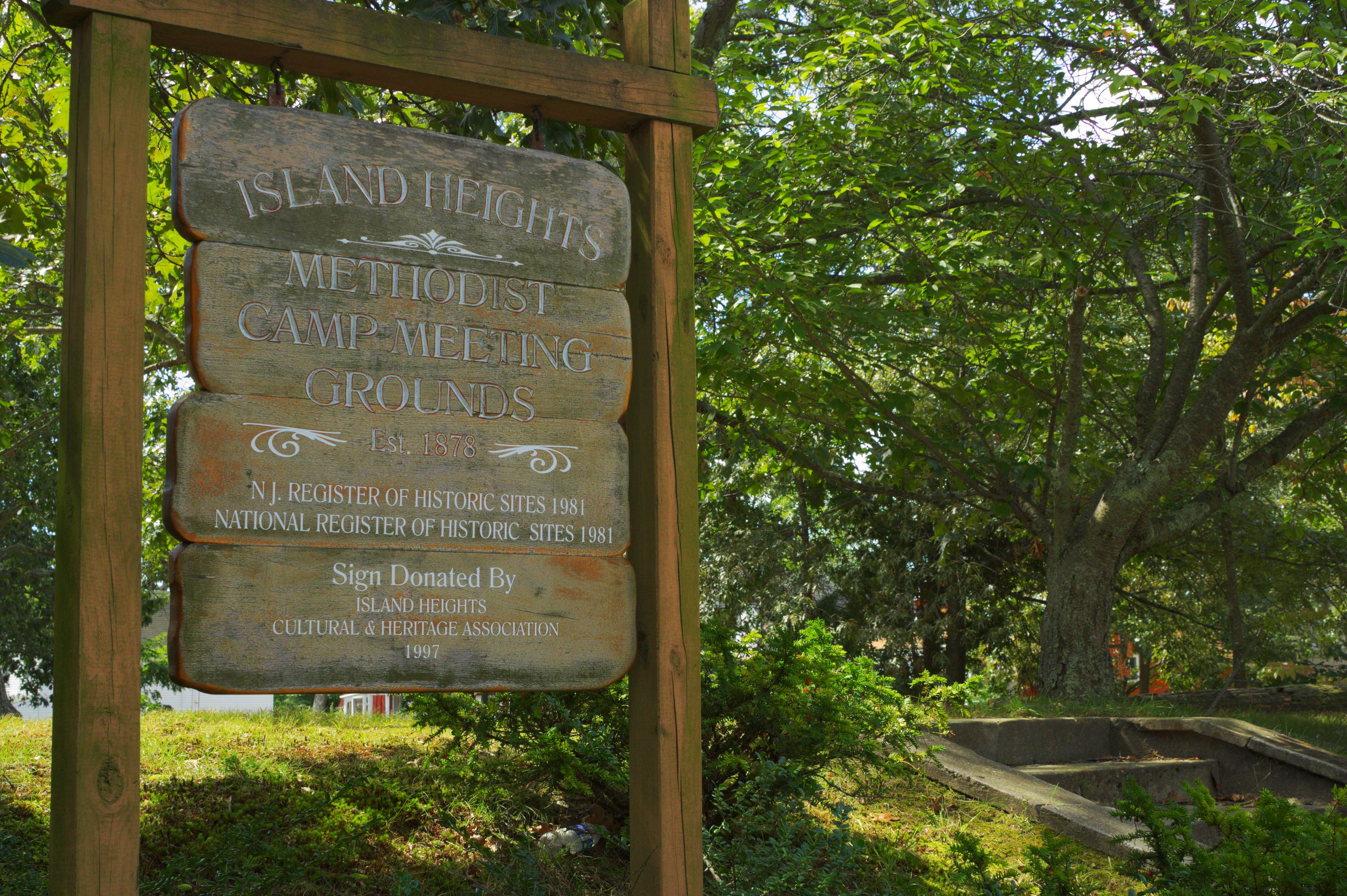
Historic district sign

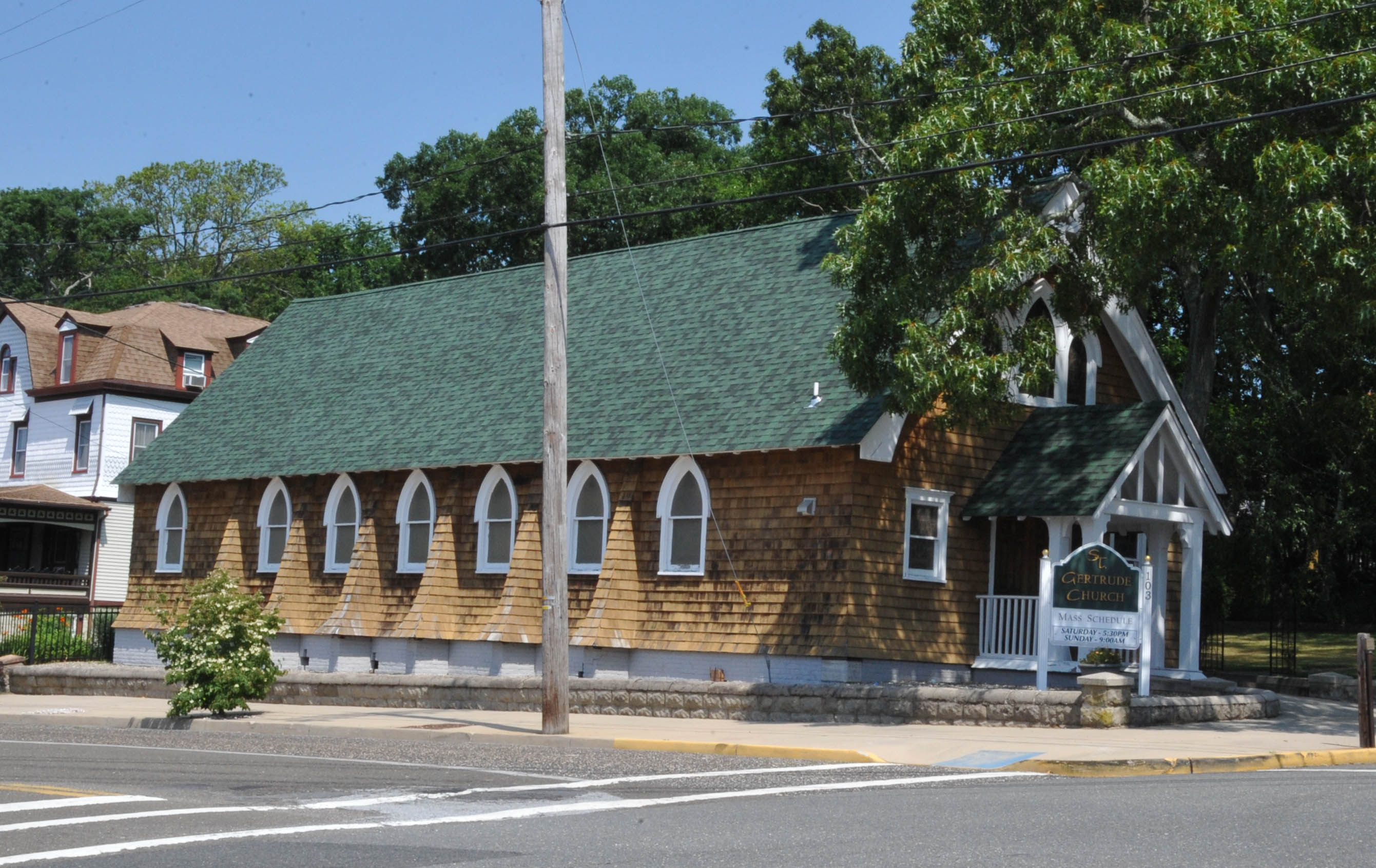
St. Gertrude's Mission Church

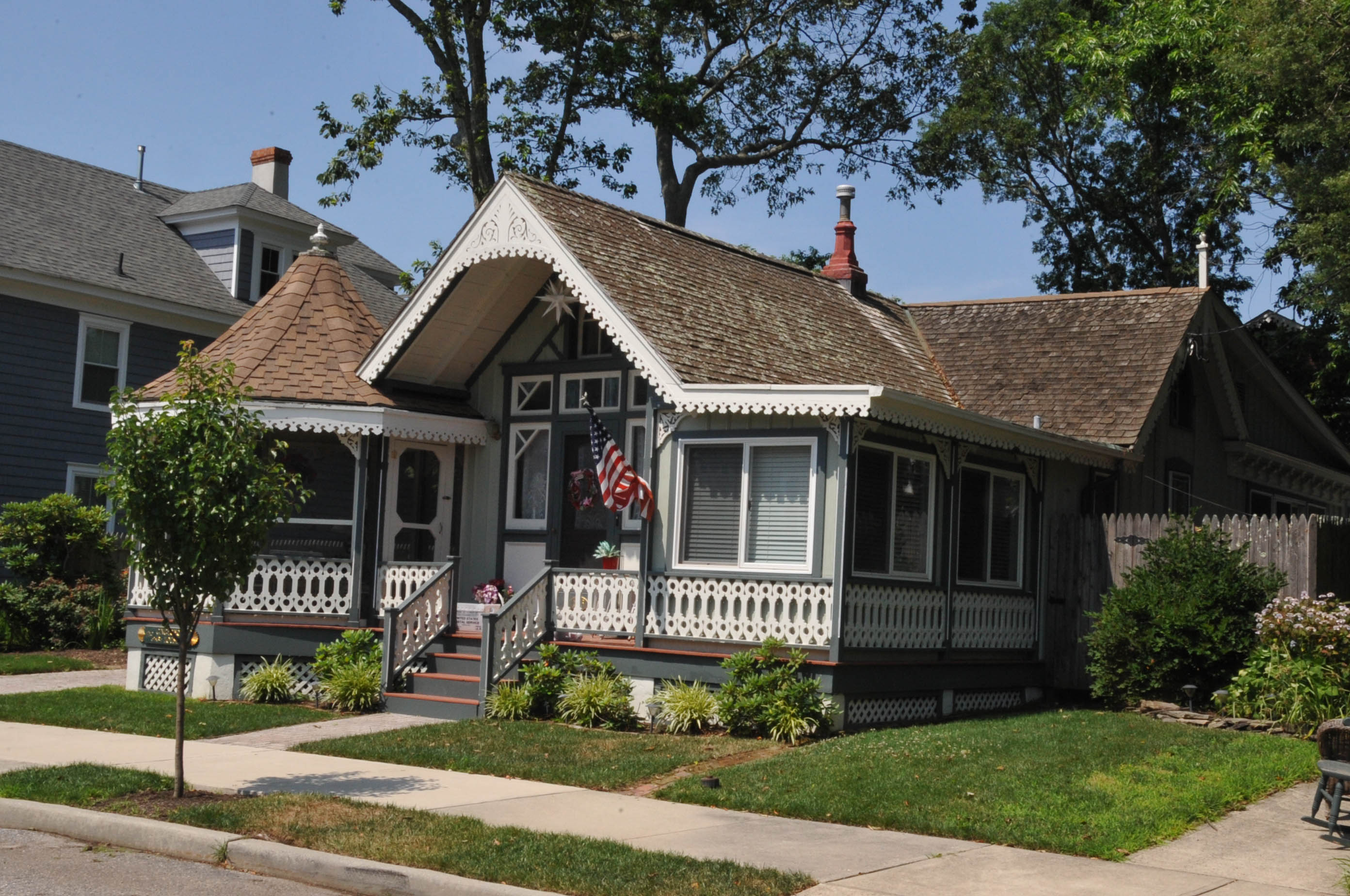
Grenley House

== Education ==
The Island Heights School District serves public school students in kindergarten through sixth grade at Island Heights Elementary School. As of the 2022–23 school year, the district, comprised of one school, had an enrollment of 133 students and 13.3 classroom teachers (on an FTE basis), for a student–teacher ratio of 10.0:1. In the 2016–17 school year, Island Heights had the 14th-smallest enrollment of any school district in the state, with 126 students. Island Heights Elementary School was one of nine schools in New Jersey honored in 2020 by the National Blue Ribbon Schools Program, which recognizes high student achievement.

Public school students in seventh through twelfth grades attend the schools of the Central Regional School District, which also serves students from the municipalities of Berkeley Township, Ocean Gate, Seaside Heights and Seaside Park. As of the 2022–23 school year, the high school district, comprised of two schools, had an enrollment of 2,344 students and 190.2 classroom teachers (on an FTE basis), for a student–teacher ratio of 12.3:1. Schools in the district (with 2022–23 enrollment data from the National Center for Education Statistics) are Central Regional Middle School with 769 students in grades 7 - 8 and Central Regional High School with 1,483 students in grades 9 - 12. The district's board of education has nine members, who are directly elected by the residents of the constituent municipalities to three-year terms of office on a staggered basis, with three seats up for election each year. Island Heights is allocated one of the board's nine seats.

== Transportation ==
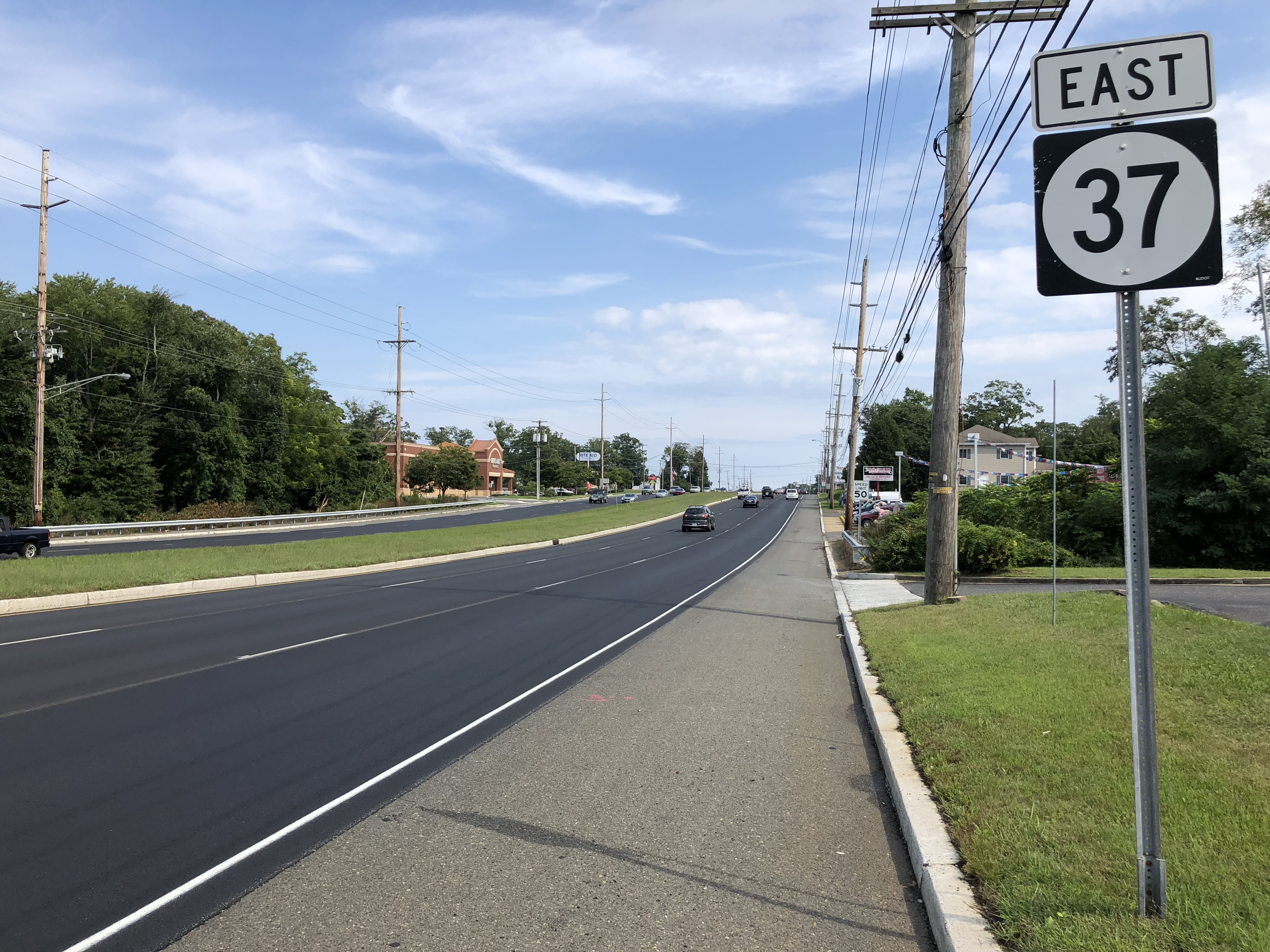
Route 37 eastbound along the north edge of Island Heights

=== Roads and highways ===
As of May 2010, the borough had a total of 12.18 miles (19.60 km) of roadways, of which 9.28 miles (14.93 km) were maintained by the municipality, 2.73 miles (4.39 km) by Ocean County and 0.17 miles (0.27 km) by the New Jersey Department of Transportation.

New Jersey Route 37 is the main highway serving Island Heights. Route 37 brushes the north edge of the borough, heading east towards Seaside Heights and west towards Lakehurst. Route 37 also provides access to New Jersey Route 35, U.S. Route 9 and the Garden State Parkway, among other major highways.

=== Public transportation ===
NJ Transit offers seasonal bus service between the borough and the Port Authority Bus Terminal in Midtown Manhattan on the 137 route and to Newark on the 67 route.

Ocean Ride local service is provided on the OC10 Toms River Connection route.

== Notable people ==
People who were born in, residents of, or otherwise closely associated with Island Heights include:

- Charles R. Chickering (1891–1970), freelance artist who designed some 77 postage stamps for the U.S. Postal Service
- Steven Doyle (born 1959), mayor of Island Heights who was President of the United States Chess Federation from 1984 to 1987, the youngest person ever to be elected to that position
- Bessie Pease Gutmann (1876–1960), artist and illustrator
- Gia Maione (1941–2013), singer and widow of Louis Prima
- John F. Peto (1854–1907), painter
- Glenn Taranto (born 1958/59), actor and screenwriter, who played Gomez Addams in The New Addams Family
- Fred Wagner (1860–1940), one of the earliest of the Pennsylvania impressionists
