= Upper Pittsgrove School District =

School district in Salem County, New Jersey, US

Address
- 235 Pine Tavern Road Upper Pittsgrove Township, Salem County, New Jersey, 08343; United States
- Coordinates: 39.629146°N 75.201249°W

District information
- Grades: PreK-8
- Superintendent: Kristin Williams
- Business administrator: Jessica Pate
- Schools: 1

Students and staff
- Enrollment: 340 (as of 2024–25)
- Faculty: 34.0 FTEs
- Student–teacher ratio: 10.0:1

Other information
- District Factor Group: DE
- Website: www.upsnj.org
Ind.	Per pupil	District spending	Rank (*)	K-8 average	%± vs. average
1A	Total Spending	$15,691	6	$18,891	−16.9%
1	Budgetary Cost	12,406	10	14,159	−12.4%
2	Classroom Instruction	7,809	15	8,659	−9.8%
6	Support Services	1,516	12	2,167	−30.0%
8	Administrative Cost	1,444	15	1,547	−6.7%
10	Operations & Maintenance	1,391	17	1,612	−13.7%
13	Extracurricular Activities	104	25	104	0.0%
16	Median Teacher Salary	58,515	38	61,136
Data from NJDoE 2014 Taxpayers' Guide to Education Spending. *Of K-8 districts with up to 400 students. Lowest spending=1; Highest=71

The Upper Pittsgrove School District is a community public school district that serves students in pre-kindergarten through eighth grade from Upper Pittsgrove Township, in Salem County, in the U.S. state of New Jersey.

As of the 2024–25 school year, the district, comprised of one school, had an enrollment of 340 students and 34.0 classroom teachers (on an FTE basis), for a student–teacher ratio of 10.0:1.

The district had been classified by the New Jersey Department of Education as being in District Factor Group "DE", the fifth-highest of eight groupings. District Factor Groups organize districts statewide to allow comparison by common socioeconomic characteristics of the local districts. From lowest socioeconomic status to highest, the categories are A, B, CD, DE, FG, GH, I and J.

Students in public school for ninth through twelfth grades attend Woodstown High School in Woodstown, which serves students from Pilesgrove Township and Woodstown, along with students Alloway Township, Oldmans Township and Upper Pittsgrove Township who attend the high school as part of sending/receiving relationships with the Woodstown-Pilesgrove Regional School District. As of the 2024–25 school year, the high school had an enrollment of 550 students and 50.4 classroom teachers (on an FTE basis), for a student–teacher ratio of 10.9:1.

== Schools ==
Upper Pittsgrove School had an enrollment of 340 students in grades PreK–8 as of the 2024–25 school year.

- Phil McFarland, principal

== Administration ==
Core members of the school's administration are:

- Kristin Williams, superintendent Williams serves as chief school administrator as part of a shared services agreement with the Mannington Township School District.
- Jessica Pate, business administrator and board secretary

== Board of education ==
The district's board of education is comprised of nine members who set policy and oversee the fiscal and educational operation of the district through its administration. As a Type II school district, the board's trustees are elected directly by voters to serve three-year terms of office on a staggered basis, with three seats up for election each year held (since 2012) as part of the November general election. The board appoints a superintendent to oversee the district's day-to-day operations and a business administrator to supervise the business functions of the district.
