= Mercer County Special Services School District =

School district in New Jersey, United States

Mercer County Special Services District

Address
- 1020 Old Trenton Road Hamilton Township, Mercer County, New Jersey, 08690
- Coordinates: 40.251317°N 74.651528°W

District information
- Grades: Special svcs.
- Superintendent: Matthew C Carey,
- Business administrator: Deborah Donnelly
- Schools: 4

Students and staff
- Enrollment: 126 (as of 2022–23)
- Faculty: 75.0 FTEs
- Student–teacher ratio: 1.7:1

Other information
- Website: www.mcsssd.info
Ind.	Per pupil	District spending	Rank (*)	Special svcs. average	%± vs. average
1A	Total Spending	$68,040	7	$18,891	260.2%
1	Budgetary Cost	60,689	7	57,252	6.0%
2	Classroom Instruction	35,102	6	32,861	6.8%
6	Support Services	14,627	7	11,945	22.5%
8	Administrative Cost	5,752	5	5,725	0.5%
10	Operations & Maintenance	5,134	4	6,215	−17.4%
16	Median Teacher Salary	84,245	7	77,183
Data from NJDoE 2014 Taxpayers' Guide to Education Spending. *Of Special svcs. districts with any number of students. Lowest spending=1; Highest=8

The Mercer County Special Services School District (MCSSSD) is a special education public school district headquartered in Hamilton Township, in Mercer County, in the U.S. state of New Jersey, whose schools offer educational and therapeutic services for students of elementary and high school age from across the county who have emotional of physical disabilities that cannot be addressed by their sending districts. The district was created in November 1977.

As of the 2022–23 school year, the district, comprised of four schools, had an enrollment of 126 students and 75.0 classroom teachers (on an FTE basis), for a student–teacher ratio of 1.7:1.

The superintendent for the district is also the superintendent for the Mercer County Technical Schools.

== Schools ==
Schools in the district (with 2018-19 enrollment data from the National Center for Education Statistics) are:

- Joseph F. Cappello School (96; PreK-6)
  - Clara Bigos, principal
- Mercer Elementary School (191; 3-8)
  - Carline Mirthil, principal

High school

- Mercer High School (271; 9-12)
  - Brian Kozakowski, principal
- New Jersey Regional Day School at Hamilton (1; 9-12)
  - Brian Kozakowski, principal

== Administration ==
Core members of the district's administration are:

- Matthew C. Carey, superintendent
- Deborah Donnelly, business administrator and board secretary
