= Central Regional High School =

High school in Ocean County, New Jersey, US

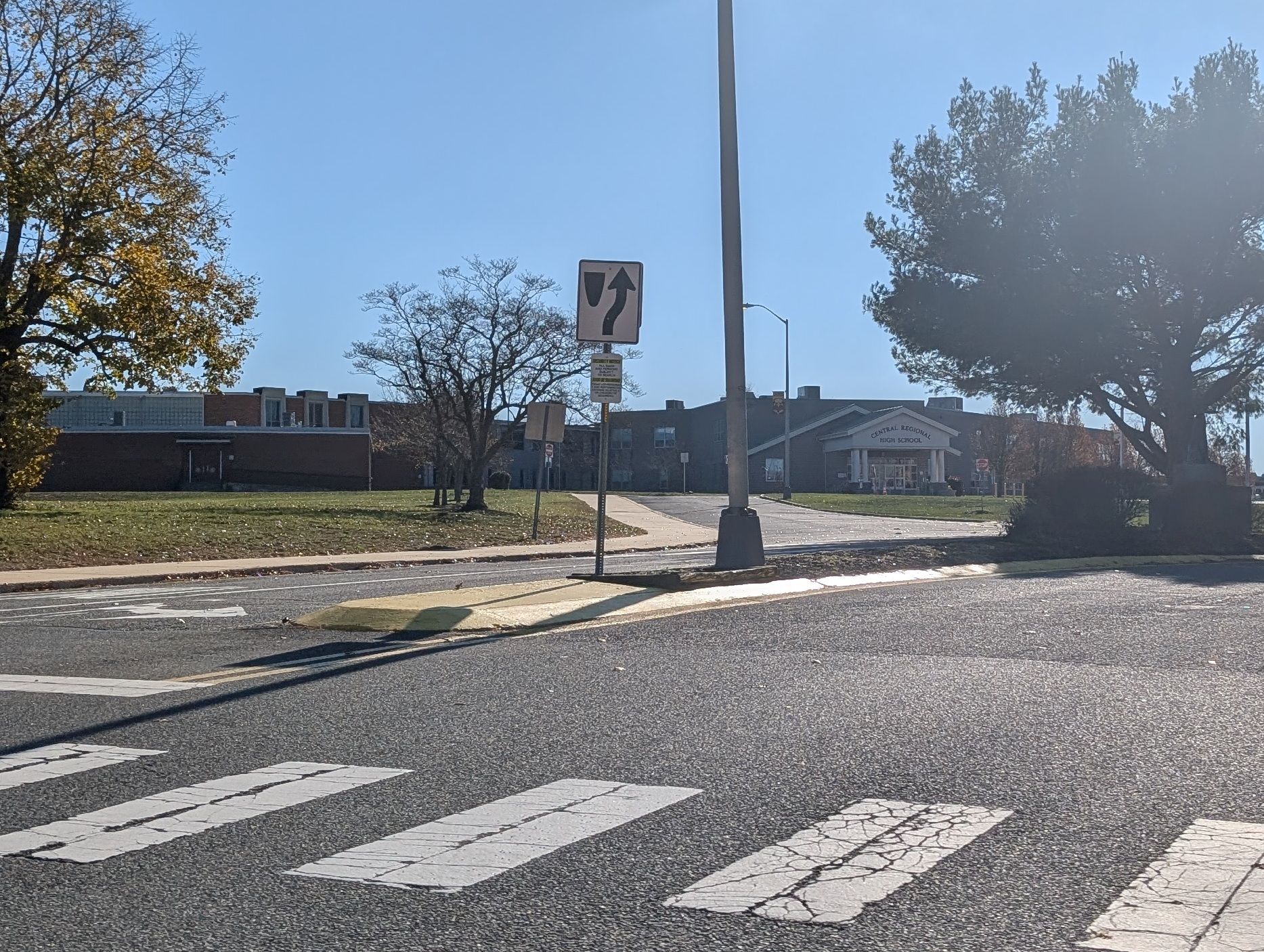

Location
- 509 Forest Hills Parkway; Berkeley Township, Ocean County, New Jersey 08721; United States; 39.8929°N 74.2044°W

Information
- Type: Public high school
- Established: September 1956
- School district: Central Regional School District
- NCES School ID: 340291004604
- Principal: Angello Mazzuca
- Faculty: 114.8 FTEs
- Grades: 9 - 12
- Enrollment: 1,489 (as of 2024–25)
- Student to teacher ratio: 13.0:1
- Colors: Garnet and Gold
- Athletics conference: Shore Conference
- Team name: Golden Eagles
- Rival: Lacey Township High School
- Website: www.wearecrsd.com/o/crhs

Central Regional High School is a four-year regional comprehensive public high school serving students in ninth through twelfth grades, located in the Bayville section of Berkeley Township in Ocean County, in the U.S. state of New Jersey, operating as part of the Central Regional School District. The high school serves students from the municipalities of Berkeley Township, Island Heights, Ocean Gate, Seaside Heights and Seaside Park.

As of the 2024–25 school year, the school had an enrollment of 1,489 students and 114.8 classroom teachers (on an FTE basis), for a student–teacher ratio of 13.0:1. There were 462 students (31.0% of enrollment) eligible for free lunch and 92 (6.2% of students) eligible for reduced-cost lunch.

== History ==
Students from the six constituent municipalities whose students had previously attended the Toms River Regional Schools, before the new district completed its school building that was constructed on a site covering 87 acres (35 ha) at a cost of $1,430,000 (equivalent to $17.2 million in 2025). The school opened in September 1956 as Central Regional Junior-Senior High School with students in grades 7-12 from the six constituent municipalities of Berkeley Township, Lacey Township, Island Heights, Ocean Gate, Seaside Park and Seaside Heights, along with students from Brick Township, who attended as part of a sending/receiving relationship. The formal dedication was deferred to late February 1957 due to construction delays.

Students from Brick Township had attended either Central Regional or Point Pleasant Beach High School until Brick Township High School opened for the 1958–59 school year.

By July 1973, the district had been operating on double sessions at the high school for two years and estimated that it would run out of room to operate on double sessions within two years, leading Lakehurst to pursue options with Manchester Township for its 250 high school students. In October 1973, the Lakehurst School District announced that its students would be shifted from Central Regional High School to the new Manchester Township High School, which opened in September 1976.

Students from Lacey Township had attended Central Regional as part of a sending/receiving relationship, which ended when Lacey Township High School opened in September 1981.

A 14-year-old female student committed suicide in February 2023 after videos of her being physically attacked in a hallway of the school surfaced online. The student's father believes that public humiliation and continued online bullying after this event spurred his daughter to end her own life. Later that month, Superintendent Triantafillos Parlapanides resigned after it was revealed that he had disclosed private information about the student to a UK newspaper, blaming the student's family and marijuana for her suicide, while downplaying the role and prevalence of bullying. The father of the deceased has described Parlapanides as a "piece of shit."

== Awards, recognition and rankings ==
The school was the 239th-ranked public high school in New Jersey out of 339 schools statewide in New Jersey Monthly magazine's September 2014 cover story on the state's "Top Public High Schools", using a new ranking methodology. The school had been ranked 264th in the state of 328 schools in 2012, after being ranked 257th in 2010 out of 322 schools listed. The magazine ranked the school 273rd in 2008 out of 316 schools. The school was the 272nd-ranked public high school in New Jersey out of 316 schools statewide, in New Jersey Monthly magazine's September 2006 cover story on the state's Top Public High Schools. Schooldigger.com ranked the school 240th out of 376 public high schools statewide in its 2010 rankings (an increase of 6 positions from the 2009 rank) which were based on the combined percentage of students classified as proficient or above proficient on the language arts literacy and mathematics components of the High School Proficiency Assessment (HSPA).

== Athletics ==
The Central Regional High School Golden Eagles compete in Division A South of the Shore Conference, an athletic conference comprised of public and private high schools in Monmouth and Ocean counties along the Jersey Shore. The conference operates under the jurisdiction of the New Jersey State Interscholastic Athletic Association (NJSIAA). With 1,060 students in grades 10-12, the school was classified by the NJSIAA for the 2019–20 school year as Group IV for most athletic competition purposes, which included schools with an enrollment of 1,060 to 5,049 students in that grade range. The school was classified by the NJSIAA as Group IV South for football for 2024–2026, which included schools with 890 to 1,298 students.

=== Baseball ===
The 1984 baseball team, led by Al Leiter, finished the season with a record of 25-5-1 after winning the Group III state championship by defeating Indian Hills High School by a score of 8-1 in the tournament final.

=== Field hockey ===
The field hockey team won the South Jersey Group III state sectional championship in 1986 before falling to Northern Highlands Regional High School in the Group III finals.

=== Softball ===
The softball team defeated Paramus High School in the final of the playoffs to win the 1996 Group III state championship.

=== Football ===
Central Regional High School is coached by Jarrett Pidgeon, who replaced Justin Fumondo to become the school's football coach for the 2020 season. He is the 7th head coach in 15 years. Since 2015, the Golden Eagles have been playing on a FieldTurf home field.

The Eagles were Class B-South co-champions in 1988, defeating arch-rival and state champion Lacey Township High School, 18-15. They finished the '88 season with a record of 6-2-1. In 1994 the Eagles won Class B-South outright and played in the Group III, South Jersey state final vs. Brick Township High School. They finished the year 9-2 and ranked in the State Top 20.

=== Volleyball ===
Both the boys and girls programs are led by former professional volleyball player Jeff Mangold.

=== Soccer ===
The Central Regional boys' soccer program is coached by Troy Van Hise, Robert Bechtloff, and Cody Ertle. Coach Bechtloff had been the head coach for over 30 years before coach Van Hise took over the program in 2018. Both Ertle and Van Hise had played under Bechtloff during their high school careers. Bechtloff is now the varsity assistant coach, while coach Ertle runs the Junior Varsity program.

Central's boys have found much success in soccer, winning Shore Conference divisional championships in 1993, 1998, 2007, and 2010. They won the NJSIAA South Jersey Group III sectional championship in 1980, 1988, 1994, and 1996.

The girls' soccer program at Central is led by Meredith Parliman, who is assisted by Lauren Stoltzfus and Brianne Toomey.

=== Wrestling ===
The Central Regional wrestling team has enjoyed several successful seasons and has produced some outstanding individuals as well. In 1968, Alan Hess became Central's first ever New Jersey state medalist finishing in fourth place (out of four) without winning a match. In 1973, Mike Baeli became the first wrestler to win a match at the state level, finishing fourth after defeating Art Kubo in the first round. In 1985, Central Regional crowned its first NJSIAA state champion, the late Darnell Myers, under the guidance of coach Paul Mueller. Brothers Mark and Maurice Worthy won a combined five NJSIAA Championships, with Mark becoming one of only two dozen wrestlers to have won three state titles, winning in 1996 (112 lbs.), 1998 (140 lbs.) and 1999 (145 lbs.), while Maurice won titles in 1996 (152 lbs.) and 1997 (160 lbs.) Maurice went on to a runner-up finish in the NCAA Division I Championships while attending the United States Military Academy at West Point. The team had a successful run in the mid-1990s under long-time head coach Pat Lynch who crowned 4 Region Champions and was named Region Coach of the Year.

Mike Bischoff, took over the reins of the program upon Lynch's retirement in 2003. For his efforts, Bischoff would twice (2006 and 2009) be recognized as District 24 Coach of the Year. In 2005, the team won its first ever South Jersey Group III state sectional title, defeating four-time defending champion Kingsway Regional High School. The following season brought a second South Jersey Group III title after dispatching Kingsway for the second straight year, taking five of the final six matches to win 34-27.

In all, the wrestling program has produced six state champions, 23 region champions, and 51 district champions. It has earned two South Jersey Group III state sectional championships in 2005 and 2006,), two district championships, and seven Shore Conference divisional championships in its history. Central's most recent state place winner was senior, Jalen Ramos (who wrestled collegiately at Rutgers), who placed 8th at the NJSIAA Championships at Atlantic City's Boardwalk Hall in 2012. Ramos's 126 career wins are second only to Hall of Famer, Mark Worthy's 128 victories.

== Marching band ==
Central Regional High School's marching band, the Marching Eagles, are a Group II Band in the Tournament of Bands circuit.

== Administration ==
The school's principal is Angello Mazzuca. His core administration team includes three assistant principals.

== Notable alumni ==
- Carmen Amato, politician who has represented the 9th Legislative District in the New Jersey Senate since 2024
- Pamela Boyd-Petroski (born 1955, class of 1974), member of the 1984 United States Olympic women's handball team
- Tom DeBlass (born 1982, class of 2000), mixed martial artist and Brazilian Jiu-Jitsu practitioner
- Al Leiter (born 1965, class of 1984), baseball television commentator, who was a former Major League Baseball pitcher
- Mark Leiter (born 1963, class of 1981), former Major League Baseball pitcher
- Phil Longo (born 1968), American football head coach for the Sam Houston Bearkats football team
- Megan McCafferty (born 1973, class of 1991), author best known for her series of books about Jessica Darling, a witty teenage heroine
- Jeff Musselman (born 1963, class of 1981), former Major League Baseball pitcher
