= Beverly City Schools =

School district in Burlington County, New Jersey, US

Address
- 601 Bentley Avenue Beverly, Burlington County, New Jersey, 08010; United States
- Coordinates: 40.061019°N 74.922787°W

District information
- Grades: Pre-K to 8
- Superintendent: Elizabeth Giacobbe
- Business administrator: Brian F. Savage
- Schools: 1

Students and staff
- Enrollment: 344 (as of 2023–24)
- Faculty: 37.0 FTEs
- Student–teacher ratio: 9.3:1

Other information
- District Factor Group: B
- Website: www.beverlycityschool.org
Ind.	Per pupil	District spending	Rank (*)	K-8 average	%± vs. average
1A	Total Spending	$18,927	41	$18,891	0.2%
1	Budgetary Cost	13,736	18	14,159	−3.0%
2	Classroom Instruction	8,101	19	8,659	−6.4%
6	Support Services	2,702	49	2,167	24.7%
8	Administrative Cost	1,444	15	1,547	−6.7%
10	Operations & Maintenance	1,419	18	1,612	−12.0%
13	Extracurricular Activities	48	19	104	−53.8%
16	Median Teacher Salary	56,149	23	61,136
Data from NJDoE 2014 Taxpayers' Guide to Education Spending. *Of K-8 districts with up to 400 students. Lowest spending=1; Highest=71

The Beverly City Schools is a community public school district that serves students in pre-kindergarten through eighth grade from Beverly in Burlington County, in the U.S. state of New Jersey.

As of the 2023–24 school year, the district, comprised of one school, had an enrollment of 344 students and 37.0 classroom teachers (on an FTE basis), for a student–teacher ratio of 9.3:1.

The district had been classified by the New Jersey Department of Education as being in District Factor Group "B", the second lowest of eight groupings. District Factor Groups organize districts statewide to allow comparison by common socioeconomic characteristics of the local districts. From lowest socioeconomic status to highest, the categories are A, B, CD, DE, FG, GH, I and J.

For ninth through twelfth grades, students in public school attend Palmyra High School in Palmyra, together with students from Riverton, as part of a sending/receiving relationship with the Palmyra Public Schools. As of the 2023–24 school year, the high school had an enrollment of 407 students and 33.8 classroom teachers (on an FTE basis), for a student–teacher ratio of 12.0:1. Beverly's sending relationship has been in place since 1967 after the City of Burlington Public School District decided that it could no longer accommodate students from Beverly at Burlington City High School.

== History ==
In 1948, during de jure educational segregation in the United States, the district had a school for black children.

In 2007, Lucille Davy, then Commissioner of the New Jersey Department of Education, appointed a monitor to oversee the financial operations of the district and be responsible to "return fiscal integrity and sound fiscal health to the district", based on the results of financial audits in previous years, including repeat audit findings and general fund deficits.

== School ==
Beverly City School had an enrollment of 334 students in grades PreK-8 in the 2023–24 school year.

== Administration ==
Core members of the district's administration are:

- Elizabeth C. Giacobbe, superintendent and principal
- Brian F. Savage, business administrator and board secretary

== Board of education ==
The district's board of education, comprised of seven members, sets policy and oversees the fiscal and educational operation of the district through its administration. As a Type II school district, the board's trustees are elected directly by voters to serve three-year terms of office on a staggered basis, with either two or three seats up for election each year held (since 2012) as part of the November general election. The board appoints a superintendent to oversee the district's day-to-day operations and a business administrator to supervise the business functions of the district.
