= Riverton School District =

School district in Burlington County, New Jersey, US

Address
- 600 Fifth Street Riverton, Burlington County, New Jersey, 08077; United States
- Coordinates: 40.01138°N 75.012445°W

District information
- Grades: K-8
- Superintendent: Joshua Zagorski
- Business administrator: Robert Foster
- Schools: 1

Students and staff
- Enrollment: 275 (as of 2022–23)
- Faculty: 28.2 FTEs
- Student–teacher ratio: 9.8:1

Other information
- District Factor Group: GH
- Website: www.riverton.k12.nj.us
Ind.	Per pupil	District spending	Rank (*)	K-8 average	%± vs. average
1A	Total Spending	$16,669	14	$18,891	−11.8%
1	Budgetary Cost	12,458	12	14,159	−12.0%
2	Classroom Instruction	7,412	11	8,659	−14.4%
6	Support Services	1,889	20	2,167	−12.8%
8	Administrative Cost	1,486	21	1,547	−3.9%
10	Operations & Maintenance	1,440	19	1,612	−10.7%
13	Extracurricular Activities	231	50	104	122.1%
16	Median Teacher Salary	59,287	41	61,136
Data from NJDoE 2014 Taxpayers' Guide to Education Spending. *Of K-8 districts with up to 400 students. Lowest spending=1; Highest=71

The Riverton School District is a community public school district that serves students in kindergarten through eighth grade from Riverton in Burlington County, in the U.S. state of New Jersey.

As of the 2022–23 school year, the district, comprising one school, had an enrollment of 275 students and 28.2 classroom teachers (on an FTE basis), for a student–teacher ratio of 9.8:1.

The district is classified by the New Jersey Department of Education as being in District Factor Group "GH", the third-highest of eight groupings. District Factor Groups organize districts statewide to allow comparison by common socioeconomic characteristics of the local districts. From lowest socioeconomic status to highest, the categories are A, B, CD, DE, FG, GH, I, and J.

For ninth through twelfth grades, students in public school attend Palmyra High School in Palmyra, together with students from Beverly, as part of a sending/receiving relationship with the Palmyra Public Schools. In the early 1990s, the district had considered options to end its sending relationship with Palmyra. As of the 2021–22 school year, the high school had an enrollment of 729 students and 3.0 classroom teachers (on an FTE basis), for a student–teacher ratio of 243.0:1.

== School ==
Riverton Elementary School served 299 students in grades PreK-8 as of the 2021–22 school year.

== Administration ==
Core district administration members are:

- Joshua Zagorski, superintendent and principal
- Robert Foster, business administrator and board secretary

== Board of education ==
The district's board of education comprises nine members who set policy and oversee the fiscal and educational operation of the district through its administration. As a Type II school district, the board's trustees are elected directly by voters to serve three-year terms of office on a staggered basis, with three seats up for election each year held (since 2012) as part of the November general election. The board appoints a superintendent to oversee the district's day-to-day operations and a business administrator to supervise the district's business functions.
