= Lumberton School District =

Lumberton School District may refer to:

- Lumberton Independent School District - Texas
- Lumberton Township School District - New Jersey
- Lumberton Public School District - Mississippi
