= Folwell =

Folwell is a surname. Notable people with the surname include:

- Arthur Folwell (1904–1966), Australian rugby player and coach
- Bob Folwell (1885–1928), American football player and coach
- Dale Folwell (born 1958), American politician
- William H. Folwell (1924–2022), American Episcopal prelate
- William Watts Folwell (1833–1929), American educator, writer, and historian
- Louis Folwell Hart (1862–1929), American politician

== See also ==
- Folwell, Minneapolis, neighborhood in Minneapolis, Minnesota, United States
- Gertrude C. Folwell School
- Fallwell
