= Chesterfield School District =

There are several school districts in the United States called Chesterfield School District, including:

- Chesterfield School District (New Hampshire), in Chesterfield, New Hampshire
- Chesterfield School District (New Jersey), in Chesterfield Township
