= Eastampton Township School District =

School district in Burlington County, New Jersey, US

Address
- 1 Student Drive Eastampton Township, Burlington County, New Jersey, 08060; United States
- Coordinates: 40.0021°N 74.7533°W

District information
- Grades: K-8
- Superintendent: Lianne Kane
- Business administrator: Joseph A. Firetto
- Schools: 1

Students and staff
- Enrollment: 612 (as of 2025–26)
- Faculty: 50.0 FTEs
- Student–teacher ratio: 11.7:1

Other information
- District Factor Group: FG
- Website: www.etsdnj.us
Ind.	Per pupil	District spending	Rank (*)	K-8 average	%± vs. average
1A	Total Spending	$18,448	31	$18,891	−2.3%
1	Budgetary Cost	13,154	18	14,159	−7.1%
2	Classroom Instruction	8,454	29	8,659	−2.4%
6	Support Services	1,584	12	2,167	−26.9%
8	Administrative Cost	1,606	26	1,547	3.8%
10	Operations & Maintenance	1,428	19	1,612	−11.4%
13	Extracurricular Activities	81	21	104	−22.1%
16	Median Teacher Salary	65,810	45	61,136
Data from NJDoE 2014 Taxpayers' Guide to Education Spending. *Of K-8 districts with 401-750 students. Lowest spending=1; Highest=64

The Eastampton Township School District is a comprehensive community public school district that serves students in kindergarten through eighth grade from Eastampton Township, in Burlington County, in the U.S. state of New Jersey.

As of the 2022–23 school year, the district, comprising one school, had an enrollment of 584 students and 50.0 classroom teachers (on an FTE basis), for a student–teacher ratio of 11.7:1.

The district is classified by the New Jersey Department of Education as being in District Factor Group "FG," the fourth-highest of eight groupings. District Factor Groups organize districts statewide to allow comparison by common socioeconomic characteristics of the local districts. From lowest socioeconomic status to highest, the categories are A, B, CD, DE, FG, GH, I and J.

Public school students in ninth through twelfth grades attend the Rancocas Valley Regional High School, a regional public high school serving students from five communities encompassing approximately 40 square miles (100 km^{2}) and composed of the communities of Eastampton Township, Hainesport Township, Lumberton Township, Mount Holly Township and Westampton Township. As of the 2022–23 school year, the high school had an enrollment of 1,981 students and 144.0 classroom teachers (on an FTE basis), for a student–teacher ratio of 13.8:1.

== Schools ==
Eastampton Community School had an enrollment of 573 students in grades PreK–8 in the 2022–23 school year.

- Lianne Kane, principal

== Administration ==
Core members of the district's administration are:

- Lianne Kane, superintendent
- Joseph A. Firetto, business administrator and board secretary

== Board of education ==
The district's board of education is comprised of seven members who set policy and oversee the fiscal and educational operation of the district through its administration. As a Type II school district, the board's trustees are elected directly by voters to serve three-year terms of office on a staggered basis, with either two or three seats up for election each year held (since 2012) as part of the November general election. The board appoints a superintendent to oversee the district's day-to-day operations and a business administrator to supervise the business functions of the district.
