= Chairville, New Jersey =

Populated place in Burlington County, New Jersey, US

- Unincorporated community
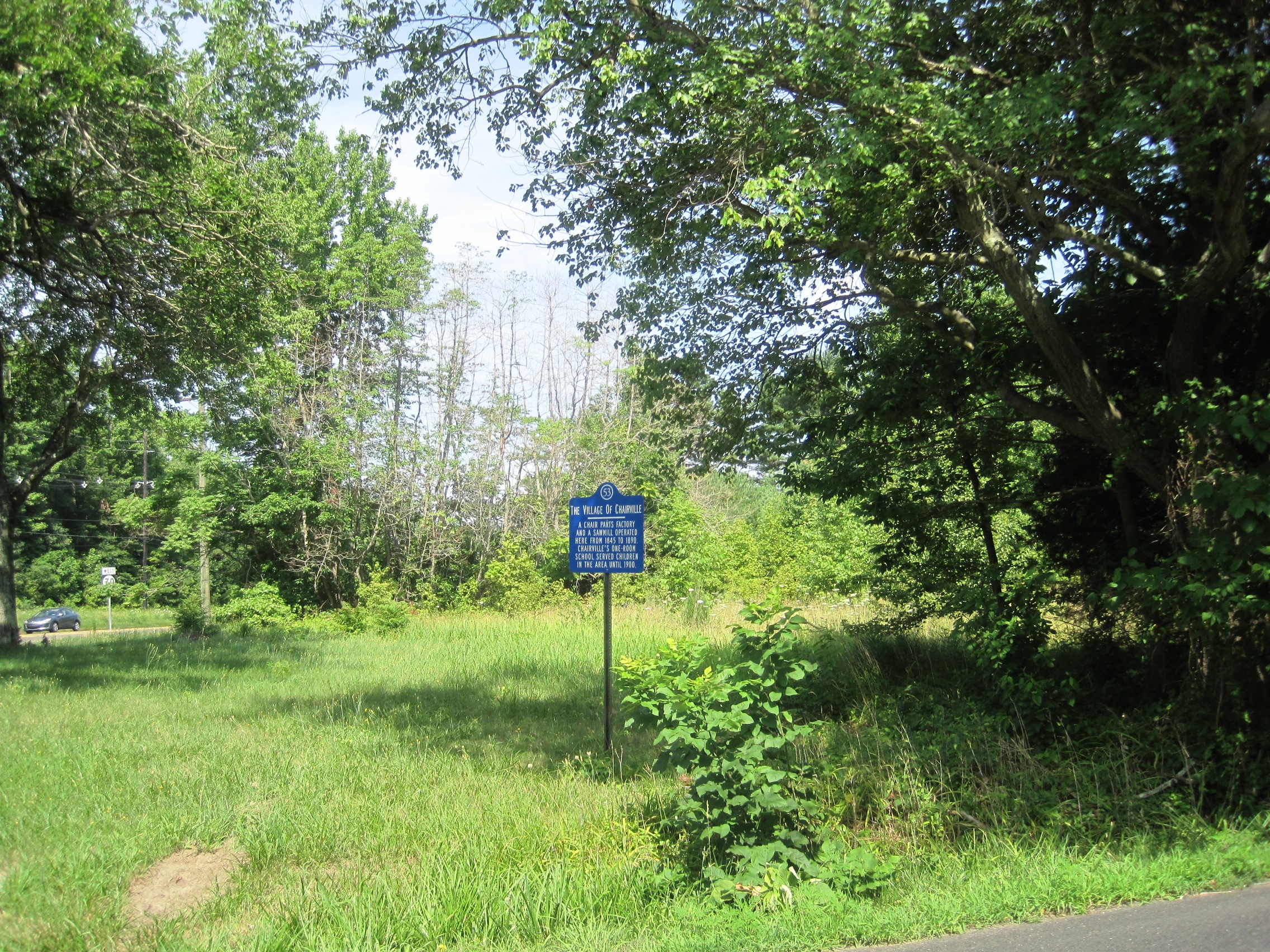
- Historical marker at the site of Chairville

- Location of Chairville in Burlington County (Inset: Location of county within the state of New Jersey) Chairville (New Jersey) Chairville (the United States)
- Coordinates: 39°53′54″N 74°47′21″W
- Country: United States
- State: New Jersey
- County: Burlington
- Township: Medford and Southampton
- Elevation: 39 ft (12 m)
- Time zone: UTC−05:00 (Eastern (EST))
  - Summer (DST): UTC−04:00 (EDT)
- Area codes: 609, 856
- GNIS feature ID: 875359

Chairville is a rural unincorporated community located along the border of Medford and Southampton townships in Burlington County, in the U.S. state of New Jersey. The settlement is named for a chair parts factory that operated from 1845 to 1890. Also located in the area were the Peacock Cemetery, a sawmill, and a one-room schoolhouse. Today, the site is located at the intersection of Chairville Road and New Jersey Route 70 and Little Creek.
