= Moorestown-Lenola, New Jersey =

Populated place in Burlington County, New Jersey, US

- Census-designated place
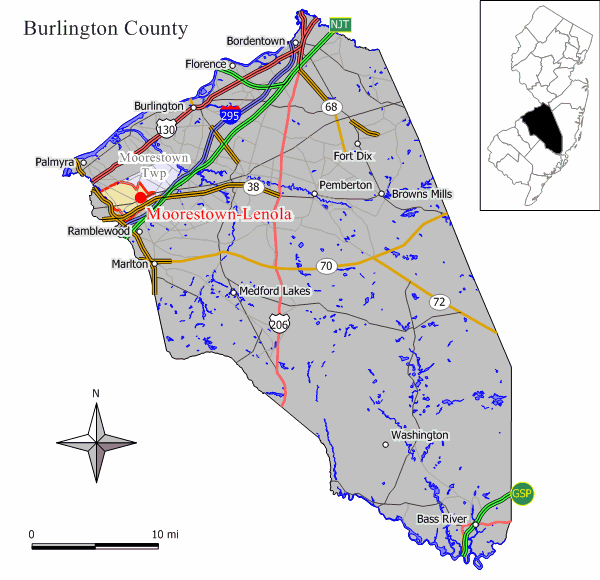
- Location of Moorestown-Lenola in Burlington County highlighted in yellow (left). Inset map: Location of Burlington County in New Jersey highlighted in black (right).

- Location in Burlington County Location in New Jersey Location in the United States
- Coordinates: 39.966524°N 74.962526°W
- Country: United States
- State: New Jersey
- County: Burlington
- Township: Moorestown

Area
  - Total: 7.11 sq mi (18.42 km^{2})
  - Land: 7.03 sq mi (18.20 km^{2})
  - Water: 0.085 sq mi (0.22 km^{2}) 1.51%
- Elevation: 62 ft (19 m)

Population (2020)
  - Total: 14,240
  - Density: 2,026.8/sq mi (782.6/km^{2})
- Time zone: UTC−05:00 (Eastern (EST))
  - Summer (DST): UTC−04:00 (Eastern (EDT))
- ZIP Code: 08057
- Area code: 856
- FIPS code: 34-47895
- GNIS feature ID: 02389504

Moorestown-Lenola is an unincorporated community and census-designated place (CDP) located within Moorestown Township in Burlington County, in the U.S. state of New Jersey. As of the 2020 census, Moorestown-Lenola had a population of 14,240.

== Geography ==
According to the United States Census Bureau, the CDP had a total area of 7.118 square miles (18.44 km^{2}), including 7.010 square miles (18.16 km^{2}) of land and 0.108 square miles (0.28 km^{2}) of water (1.51%).

== Demographics ==
Historical population
Census	Pop.	Note	%±
1970	14,179		—
1980	13,695		−3.4%
1990	13,242		−3.3%
2000	13,860		4.7%
2010	14,217		2.6%
2020	14,240		0.2%
Population sources: 1950 1960 1970; 1980 1990 2000; 2010 2020

Moorestown-Lenola first appeared as an unincorporated community in the 1970 U.S. census; and then was listed as a census designated place in the 1980 U.S. census.

=== Racial and ethnic composition ===
Moorestown-Lenola CDP, New Jersey – Racial and ethnic composition Note: the US Census treats Hispanic/Latino as an ethnic category. This table excludes Latinos from the racial categories and assigns them to a separate category. Hispanics/Latinos may be of any race.
Race / Ethnicity (NH = Non-Hispanic)	Pop 2000	Pop 2010	Pop 2020	% 2000	% 2010	% 2020
White alone (NH)	12,122	11,713	11,048	87.46%	82.39%	77.58%
Black or African American alone (NH)	939	1,127	1,004	6.77%	7.93%	7.05%
Native American or Alaska Native alone (NH)	23	13	14	0.17%	0.09%	0.10%
Asian alone (NH)	294	440	646	2.12%	3.09%	4.54%
Native Hawaiian or Pacific Islander alone (NH)	1	4	0	0.01%	0.03%	0.00%
Other race alone (NH)	19	31	73	0.14%	0.22%	0.51%
Mixed race or Multiracial (NH)	188	302	637	1.36%	2.12%	4.47%
Hispanic or Latino (any race)	274	587	818	1.98%	4.13%	5.74%
Total	13,860	14,217	14,240	100.00%	100.00%	100.00%

=== 2020 census ===
As of the 2020 census, Moorestown-Lenola had a population of 14,240. The median age was 44.4 years. 23.7% of residents were under the age of 18 and 19.1% were 65 years of age or older. For every 100 females there were 91.4 males, and for every 100 females age 18 and over there were 86.4 males.

100.0% of residents lived in urban areas, while 0.0% lived in rural areas.

There were 5,241 households, of which 34.7% had children under the age of 18 living in them. Of all households, 55.9% were married-couple households, 13.5% had a male householder with no spouse or partner present, and 26.4% had a female householder with no spouse or partner present. About 22.8% of all households were made up of individuals, and 11.0% had someone living alone who was 65 years of age or older.

There were 5,560 housing units, of which 5.7% were vacant. The homeowner vacancy rate was 1.7% and the rental vacancy rate was 7.3%.

=== 2010 census ===
The 2010 United States census counted 14,217 people, 5,310 households, and 3,882 families in the CDP. The population density was 2,028.0 people per square mile (783.0 people/km^{2}). There were 5,595 housing units at an average density of 798.1 units per square mile (308.1 units/km^{2}). The racial makeup was 84.93% (12,074) White, 8.29% (1,178) Black or African American, 0.11% (16) Native American, 3.14% (447) Asian, 0.04% (5) Pacific Islander, 1.03% (147) from other races, and 2.46% (350) from two or more races. Hispanic or Latino of any race were 4.13% (587) of the population.

Of the 5,310 households, 34.7% had children under the age of 18; 56.2% were married couples living together; 13.3% had a female householder with no husband present and 26.9% were non-families. Of all households, 23.5% were made up of individuals and 11.4% had someone living alone who was 65 years of age or older. The average household size was 2.63 and the average family size was 3.12.

25.7% of the population were under the age of 18, 6.5% from 18 to 24, 20.0% from 25 to 44, 30.9% from 45 to 64, and 16.8% who were 65 years of age or older. The median age was 43.5 years. For every 100 females, the population had 90.1 males. For every 100 females ages 18 and older there were 84.3 males.

=== 2000 census ===
As of the 2000 United States census there were 13,860 people, 5,250 households, and 3,827 families living in the CDP. The population density was 760.1 people/km^{2} (1,969 people/mi^{2}). There were 5,440 housing units at an average density of 298.4 units/km^{2} (773 units/mi^{2}). The racial makeup of the CDP was 88.68% White, 6.96% African American, 0.19% Native American, 2.13% Asian, 0.01% Pacific Islander, 0.55% from other races, and 1.49% from two or more races. Hispanic or Latino of any race were 1.98% of the population.

There were 5,250 households, out of which 34.7% had children under the age of 18 living with them, 59.5% were married couples living together, 10.9% had a female householder with no husband present, and 27.1% were non-families. 23.2% of all households were made up of individuals, and 10.9% had someone living alone who was 65 years of age or older. The average household size was 2.59 and the average family size was 3.07.

In the CDP the population was spread out, with 26.4% under the age of 18, 4.7% from 18 to 24, 25.6% from 25 to 44, 25.7% from 45 to 64, and 17.6% who were 65 years of age or older. The median age was 41 years. For every 100 females, there were 87.8 males. For every 100 females age 18 and over, there were 83.8 males.

The median income for a household in the CDP was $68,770, and the median income for a family was $79,953. Males had a median income of $60,486 versus $34,847 for females. The per capita income for the CDP was $34,311. About 3.0% of families and 4.3% of the population were below the poverty line, including 4.4% of those under age 18 and 3.6% of those age 65 or over.

== Education ==
Its school district is Moorestown Township School District.
