= Washington Township School District (Burlington County, New Jersey) =

School district in Burlington County, New Jersey, US

Address
- 2434 County Route 563 Washington Township, Burlington County, New Jersey, 08215; United States
- Coordinates: 39.532468°N 74.620656°W

District information
- Grades: Pre-K to 8
- Superintendent: Thomas Baruffi (interim)
- Business administrator: Karen Gfroehrer
- Schools: 1

Students and staff
- Enrollment: 107 (as of 2014-15)
- Faculty: 4.4 FTEs
- Student–teacher ratio: 24.2:1

Other information
- District Factor Group: A
| Ind. | Per pupil | District spending | Rank (*) | K-8 average | %± vs. average |
|---|---|---|---|---|---|
| 1A | Total Spending | $20,465 | 46 | $18,891 | 8.3% |
| 1 | Budgetary Cost | 23,206 | 67 | 14,159 | 63.9% |
| 2 | Classroom Instruction | 12,698 | 67 | 8,659 | 46.6% |
| 6 | Support Services | 3,655 | 60 | 2,167 | 68.7% |
| 8 | Administrative Cost | 1,819 | 52 | 1,547 | 17.6% |
| 10 | Operations & Maintenance | 4,840 | 70 | 1,612 | 200.2% |
| 16 | Median Teacher Salary | 37,660 | 1 | 61,136 |
Data from NJDoE 2014 Taxpayers' Guide to Education Spending. *Of K-8 districts with up to 400 students. Lowest spending=1; Highest=71

The Washington Township School District is a non-operating community public school district that serves students in kindergarten through eighth grade from Washington Township, in Burlington County, in the U.S. state of New Jersey.

As of the 2014-15 school year, the district and its one school had an enrollment of 107 students and 4.4 classroom teachers (on an FTE basis), for a student–teacher ratio of 24.2:1.

Since the 2007-08 school year, as part of an agreement with the Mullica Township Schools, Washington Township receives additional teaching support from the Mullica district and shares its superintendent and business administrator. Washington Township students in grades five through eight attend Mullica Township Middle School as part of a program that has expanded since it was initiated in the 2007-08 school year.

The district participates in the Interdistrict Public School Choice Program at Green Bank Elementary School, having been approved on November 2, 1999, as one of the first ten districts statewide to participate in the program. Seats in the program for non-resident students are specified by the district and are allocated by lottery, with tuition paid for participating students by the New Jersey Department of Education.

The district is classified by the New Jersey Department of Education as being in District Factor Group "A", the lowest of eight groupings. District Factor Groups organize districts statewide to allow comparison by common socioeconomic characteristics of the local districts. From lowest socioeconomic status to highest, the categories are A, B, CD, DE, FG, GH, I and J.

Students in ninth through twelfth grades attend Cedar Creek High School, which is located in the northern section of Egg Harbor City and opened to students in September 2010. The school is one of three high schools operated as part of the Greater Egg Harbor Regional High School District, which includes the constituent municipalities of Egg Harbor City, Galloway Township, Hamilton Township, and Mullica Township, and participates in sending/receiving relationships with Port Republic and Washington Township. Cedar Creek High School is zoned to serve students from Egg Harbor City, Mullica Township, Port Republic and Washington Township, while students in portions of Galloway and Hamilton townships have the can attend Cedar Creek as an option or to participate in magnet programs at the school. Prior to the opening of Cedar Creek, students from Washington Township had attended Oakcrest High School, together with students from Hamilton Township, Mullica Township and Port Republic. As of the 2014-15 school year, the high school had an enrollment of 910 students and 66.4 classroom teachers (on an FTE basis), for a student–teacher ratio of 13.7:1.

== History ==
Circa 2016 a feasibility study was done over whether the district should close its school and send the elementary school students to the Mullica Township school system.

== School ==
Green Bank Elementary School had an enrollment of 41 students during the 2014-15 school year. The current school building opened in September 2006.

== Administration ==
Core members of the district's administration are:

- Thomas Baruffi, interim superintendent
- Karen Gfroehrer, business administrator and board secretary
