= Burlington City High School =

High school in Burlington County, New Jersey, US

Location
- 100 Blue Devil Way; Burlington, Burlington County, New Jersey 08016; United States; 40.069265°N 74.852871°W

Information
- Type: Public high school
- School district: City of Burlington Public School District
- NCES School ID: 340243000966
- Principal: Juan Arbelaez
- Faculty: 72.8 FTEs
- Grades: 7-12
- Enrollment: 757 (as of 2024–25)
- Student to teacher ratio: 10.4:1
- Colors: Royal Blue; White
- Athletics conference: Burlington County Scholastic League
- Team name: Blue Devils
- Rivals: Palmyra Panthers
- Accreditation: Middle States Association of Colleges and Schools
- Newspaper: Arrowhead
- Website: hsbc.burlington-nj.net

Burlington City High School is a six-year comprehensive public high school that serves students in seventh through twelfth grade in Burlington, in Burlington County, in the U.S. state of New Jersey, operating as the lone secondary school of the City of Burlington Public School District. Burlington City High School serves as the receiving school for students in grade nine through twelve from Edgewater Park, as part of a sending/receiving relationship with the Edgewater Park School District. The school is accredited by the Middle States Association of Colleges and Schools Commissions on Elementary and Secondary Schools until July 2026; The school's accreditation status was extended for seven years in Fall 2018.

Grades 7 and 8 are housed in a separate area of the building set-aside for them, and referred to as the "House", or Junior School. The House offers a curriculum designed for this age group, along with co-curricular activities appropriate for these students. Grades nine through twelve are accredited by the New Jersey Department of Education.

As of the 2024–25 school year, the school had an enrollment of 757 students and 72.8 classroom teachers (on an FTE basis), for a student–teacher ratio of 10.4:1. There were 419 students (55.4% of enrollment) eligible for free lunch and 75 (9.9% of students) eligible for reduced-cost lunch.

== Awards, recognition and rankings ==
The school was the 276th-ranked public high school in New Jersey out of 339 schools statewide in New Jersey Monthly magazine's September 2014 cover story on the state's "Top Public High Schools", using a new ranking methodology. The school had been ranked 197th in the state of 328 schools in 2012, after being ranked 268th in 2010 out of 322 schools listed. The magazine ranked the school 267th in 2008 out of 316 schools. The school was ranked 252nd in the magazine's September 2006 issue, which surveyed 316 schools across the state. Schooldigger.com ranked the school as tied for 331st out of 376 public high schools statewide in its 2010 rankings (a decrease of 9 positions from the 2009 rank) which were based on the combined percentage of students classified as proficient or above proficient on the language arts literacy and mathematics components of the High School Proficiency Assessment (HSPA).

== Curriculum ==
Burlington City High offers students over 100 courses in academic, fine and performing arts, technical and vocational areas. Ten Advanced Placement Program (AP) courses are offered.

== Athletics ==
The Burlington City High School Blue Devils compete in the Burlington County Scholastic League (BCSL) a sports association comprised of public and private high schools in Burlington, Camden, Mercer and Ocean counties in Central Jersey, operating under the jurisdiction of the New Jersey State Interscholastic Athletic Association (NJSIAA). With 419 students in grades 10-12, the school was classified by the NJSIAA for the 2022–24 school years as Group I South for most athletic competition purposes. The football team competes in the Freedom Division of the 94-team West Jersey Football League superconference and was classified by the NJSIAA as Group I South for football for 2024–2026, which included schools with 185 to 482 students.

The team colors are royal blue and white. Interscholastic sports offered by the school include baseball, basketball (men and women), field hockey, soccer (men and women), softball, tennis (men and women), track and field spring (men and women), track and field winter (men and women) and wrestling.

The boys basketball team won the Group II state championship in 1966 (defeating runner-up Roselle Park High School in the tournament final), won the Group I title in 2002 (vs. Cresskill High School) and was declared the South I Regional champion in 2020 after the finals were cancelled as a result of the COVID-19 pandemic. The 1966 team finished the season with a record of 24-0, overcoming 40 points by Roselle Park's top scorer to win the Group II state championship game by a score of 64-54 in front of a crowd of more than 8,000 at Convention Hall in Atlantic City.

The football team won the South Jersey Group II state sectional championship in 1979.

The softball team finished the 1998 season with a 18-2 record after winning the Group I championship by defeating Cedar Grove High School by a score of 15-5 in the final of the playoffs.

== Administration ==
The school's principal is Juan Arbelaez. His administration team includes two vice principals and the athletic director.

== Notable alumni ==
- Sam Calderone (1926-2006), catcher who played in the Major Leagues in 1950 and from 1953 to 1954
- Eddie Miksis (1926-2005), played Major League Baseball from 1944 to 1958
- Barney Schultz (1926-2015), Major League Baseball pitcher from 1955 to 1965
- Balvir Singh (born 1984), teacher at BCHS and politician who has represented the 7th Legislative District in the New Jersey General Assembly since 2025
