= Fellowship, New Jersey =

Populated place in Burlington County, New Jersey, US

- Unincorporated community
- Location in Burlington County (Inset: Burlington County in New Jersey) Fellowship (New Jersey) Fellowship (the United States)
- Coordinates: 39°55′39″N 74°58′00″W
- Country: United States
- State: New Jersey
- County: Burlington
- Township: Mount Laurel
- Elevation: 49 ft (15 m)
- Time zone: UTC−05:00 (Eastern (EST))
  - Summer (DST): UTC−04:00 (Eastern (EDT))
- Area code: 856
- GNIS feature ID: 876315

Fellowship is an unincorporated community located within Mount Laurel, in Burlington County, in the U.S. state of New Jersey. The community of Fellowship was originally settled by a Quaker named George Roberts. Fellowship was the most developed of the settlements that comprised Mount Laurel. The community had included two general stores, a wagon shop, a shoe shop, a blacksmith shop, mechanics shops and a boarding school. Today, the community of Fellowship is surrounded by several business establishments and residential subdivisions.

== Transportation ==
Route 73 is a major state highway that travels through Fellowship. In addition, the New Jersey Turnpike and Interstate 295 run through Fellowship. Both highways provide access to the community.

New Jersey Transit provides local bus service on the 457 route.
