= Westampton Township Schools =

Public school district in Cape May County, New Jersey, US

Address
- 700 Rancocas Road Westampton, Burlington County, New Jersey, 08060; United States
- Coordinates: 40.00362°N 74.789169°W

District information
- Grades: Pre-K to 8
- Superintendent: James DiDonato
- Business administrator: Karen Greer
- Schools: 2

Students and staff
- Enrollment: 937 (as of 2021–22)
- Faculty: 87.2 FTEs
- Student–teacher ratio: 10.7:1

Other information
- District Factor Group: GH
- Website: www.westamptonschools.org
Ind.	Per pupil	District spending	Rank (*)	K-8 average	%± vs. average
1A	Total Spending	$14,749	10	$18,891	−21.9%
1	Budgetary Cost	11,560	11	14,159	−18.4%
2	Classroom Instruction	7,383	11	8,659	−14.7%
6	Support Services	1,533	10	2,167	−29.3%
8	Administrative Cost	1,158	6	1,547	−25.1%
10	Operations & Maintenance	1,417	30	1,612	−12.1%
13	Extracurricular Activities	65	19	104	−37.5%
16	Median Teacher Salary	57,025	18	61,136
Data from NJDoE 2014 Taxpayers' Guide to Education Spending. *Of K-8 districts with more than 750 students. Lowest spending=1; Highest=84

The Westampton Township Schools are a community public school district that serves students in pre-kindergarten through eighth grade from Westampton, in Burlington County, in the U.S. state of New Jersey.

As of the 2021–22 school year, the district, comprised of two schools, had an enrollment of 937 students and 87.2 classroom teachers (on an FTE basis), for a student–teacher ratio of 10.7:1.

The district is classified by the New Jersey Department of Education as being in District Factor Group "GH", the third-highest of eight groupings. District Factor Groups organize districts statewide to allow comparison by common socioeconomic characteristics of the local districts. From lowest socioeconomic status to highest, the categories are A, B, CD, DE, FG, GH, I and J.

For ninth through twelfth grades, public school students attend the Rancocas Valley Regional High School, a comprehensive regional public high school that is part of the Rancocas Valley Regional High School District, which also serves students from the communities of Eastampton Township, Hainesport Township, Lumberton Township and Mount Holly Township. As of the 2021–22 school year, the high school had an enrollment of 2,048 students and 140.3 classroom teachers (on an FTE basis), for a student–teacher ratio of 14.6:1. The school is located in Mount Holly Township.

== Schools ==
The schools in the district (with 2021–22 enrollment data from the National Center for Education Statistics) are:

- Holly Hills Elementary School with 403 students in pre-kindergarten through 3rd grade
  - Jennifer Murray, principal
- Westampton Intermediate School / Westampton Middle School with 524 students in PreK and grades 4 to 8
  - Rachel Feldman, intermediate school principal
  - Yashanta Holloway-Taluy, middle school principal

== Administration ==
Core members of the district's administration are:

- James DiDonato, superintendent
- Karen Greer, business administrator and board secretary

== Board of education ==
The district's board of education is comprised of nine members who set policy and oversee the fiscal and educational operation of the district through its administration. As a Type II school district, the board's trustees are elected directly by voters to serve three-year terms of office on a staggered basis, with three seats up for election each year held (since 2012) as part of the November general election. The board appoints a superintendent to oversee the district's day-to-day operations and a business administrator to supervise the business functions of the district.
