= High Crossing, New Jersey =

Populated place in Burlington County, New Jersey, US

- Unincorporated community and ghost town
- Location within Burlington County, New Jersey Location within New Jersey Location within the United States
- Coordinates: 39°46′09″N 74°38′39″W
- Country: United States
- State: New Jersey
- County: Burlington
- Township: Tabernacle
- Elevation: 66 ft (20 m)
- Time zone: UTC−05:00 (Eastern (EST))
  - Summer (DST): UTC−04:00 (EDT)
- GNIS feature ID: 877093

High Crossing is a ghost town in Tabernacle Township, in Burlington County, in the U.S. state of New Jersey.

High Crossing is located within the Wharton State Forest, and within the New Jersey Pinelands National Reserve.

== Location ==
High Crossing is located where "Tuckerton Road"—an early stage route connecting Camden with Tuckerton—crossed the Southern Division of the Central Railroad of New Jersey, which connected Red Bank with Bridgeton. The railroad line was abandoned in the early 1980s.

North of High Crossing is the location where Mexican aviator Emilio Carranza crashed and died in 1928. A memorial is located there.

== Today ==
Several sand roads meet at High Crossing, and it is a popular gathering place for off-road vehicles.

A short distance east of High Crossing is the Batona Trail, a 50 mi (80 km) hiking trail connecting Ong's Hat with the Bass River State Forest.
