= Bordentown Regional School District =

School district in Burlington County, New Jersey, US

Address
- 48 Dunns Mill Road Bordentown, Burlington County, New Jersey, 08505; United States
- Coordinates: 40.132598°N 74.721203°W

District information
- Grades: PreK-12
- Superintendent: Edward Forsthoffer
- Business administrator: Chifonda Henry
- Schools: 5

Students and staff
- Enrollment: 2,232 (as of 2023–24)
- Faculty: 190.0 FTEs
- Student–teacher ratio: 11.8:1

Other information
- District Factor Group: DE
- Website: www.bordentown.k12.nj.us
Ind.	Per pupil	District spending	Rank (*)	K-12 average	%± vs. average
1A	Total Spending	$16,943	23	$18,891	−10.3%
1	Budgetary Cost	12,375	13	14,783	−16.3%
2	Classroom Instruction	6,780	5	8,763	−22.6%
6	Support Services	2,125	42	2,392	−11.2%
8	Administrative Cost	1,254	8	1,485	−15.6%
10	Operations & Maintenance	1,738	45	1,783	−2.5%
13	Extracurricular Activities	363	28	268	35.4%
16	Median Teacher Salary	58,214	14	64,043
Data from NJDoE 2014 Taxpayers' Guide to Education Spending. *Of K-12 districts with 1,800-3,500 students. Lowest spending=1; Highest=68

The Bordentown Regional School District is a comprehensive regional public school district that serves students in pre-Kindergarten through twelfth grade from communities in Burlington County, in the U.S. state of New Jersey. The district serves students from Bordentown City, Bordentown Township and Fieldsboro Borough.

As of the 2023–24 school year, the district, comprised of five schools, had an enrollment of 2,232 students and 190.0 classroom teachers (on an FTE basis), for a student–teacher ratio of 11.8:1.

The New Hanover Township School District, consisting of non-military portions of New Hanover Township (including its Cookstown area) and Wrightstown Borough, sends students to Bordentown Regional High School on a tuition basis for grades 9–12 as part of a sending/receiving relationship that has been in place since the 1960s, with about 50 students from the New Hanover district being sent to the high school. As of 2011, the New Hanover district was considering expansion of its relationship to send students to Bordentown for middle school for grades 6–8.

== History ==
In 1948, during de jure educational segregation in the United States, the district had a school for black children.

Edward Forsthoffer retired effective July 1, 2021, and was succeeded by Trudy Atkins.

The district had been classified by the New Jersey Department of Education as being in District Factor Group "DE", the fifth highest of eight groupings. District Factor Groups organize districts statewide to allow comparison by common socioeconomic characteristics of the local districts. From lowest socioeconomic status to highest, the categories are A, B, CD, DE, FG, GH, I and J.

== Awards and recognition ==
Bordentown Regional High School was recognized by Governor Jim McGreevey in 2003 as one of 25 schools selected statewide for the First Annual Governor's School of Excellence award.

For the 2005–06 school year, Peter Muschal School was one of 22 schools statewide selected as Governor's School of Excellence Winners, an award given to schools that have demonstrated significant academic improvement over the previous two academic years.

== Schools ==
Schools in the district (with 2023–24 enrollment data from the National Center for Education Statistics) are:

Elementary schools

- Clara Barton Elementary School with 215 students in grades K–2 (generally serves Bordentown City and the Holloway Meadows section of Bordentown Township)
  - Heather Wawrzyniak, principal
- Peter Muschal Elementary School with 480 students in grades PreK–5 (generally serves remainder of Bordentown Township and the Borough of Fieldsboro)
  - James Lymper, principal
- MacFarland Intermediate School with 247 students in grades 3–5
  - Daniel Riether, principal

Middle school

- Bordentown Regional Middle School with 505 students in grades 6–8
  - Joseph Sprague, principal

High school

- Bordentown Regional High School with 762 students in grades 9–12
  - Robert Walder, principal

== Administration ==
Core members of the district's administration are:

- Edward Forsthoffer, superintendent
- Chifonda Henry, business administrator and board secretary

== Board of education ==
The district's board of education is comprised of nine members who set policy and oversee the fiscal and educational operation of the district through its administration. As a Type II school district, the board's trustees are elected directly by voters to serve three-year terms of office on a staggered basis, with three seats up for election each year held (since 2012) as part of the November general election. The board appoints a superintendent to oversee the district's day-to-day operations and a business administrator to supervise the business functions of the district. The board's nine seats are allocated based on the population of the constituent municipalities, with six seats assigned to Bordentown Township, two seats to Bordentown City and one seat to Fieldsboro; a tenth, non-voting seat is assigned to New Hanover Township.
