= Seal of Burlington County, New Jersey =

Seal of Burlington County
- Adopted: August 21, 2020
- Crest: A wagon proceeding over a cement causeway with seagulls in attendance
- Motto: Burlington County • New Jersey

The Seal of Burlington County, New Jersey consists of a wagon proceeding over a cement causeway with seagulls in attendance. The wording around the seal is "Burlington County • New Jersey". The exact shading and size of the elements of the seal vary depending on the publication, however, efforts were taken in 2020 to standardize the seal.

== 1694-2020 version ==
Historic Seal of Burlington County
- Adopted: May 17, 1694
- Relinquished: August 21, 2020
- Crest: A wagon proceeding over a cement causeway with seagulls in attendance
- Motto: Burlington County, NJ • Board of Chosen Freeholders

The original version of the seal, as implemented during the county's creation on May 17, 1694, is identical to its modern counterpart, however, it was changed to remove the term "Board of Chosen Freeholders" following Governor Phil Murphy's decision to rebrand the term "Freeholders" state-wide into County Commissioners. Claiming the term "Freeholder" is racist due to it denoting someone who owns land and is free of debt, which, at the time of the office's creation, could only apply to white men. The Board of Chosen Freeholders unanimously voted 13-0 to rename themselves the Board of County Commissioners and to remove the term "Board of Chosen Freeholders" from the county seal effective on August 21, 2020.
