= Edgewater Park School District =

School district in Burlington County, New Jersey, US

Address
- 25 Washington Avenue Edgewater Park, Burlington County, New Jersey, 08010; United States
- Coordinates: 40.055948°N 74.913703°W

District information
- Grades: Pre-K to 8
- Superintendent: Pamela Nathan
- Business administrator: Nancy Lane
- Schools: 2

Students and staff
- Enrollment: 1,015 (as of 2023–24)
- Faculty: 84.0 FTEs
- Student–teacher ratio: 12.1:1

Other information
- District Factor Group: DE
- Website: www.edgewaterparksd.org
Ind.	Per pupil	District spending	Rank (*)	K-8 average	%± vs. average
1A	Total Spending	$16,578	30	$18,891	−12.2%
1	Budgetary Cost	13,240	30	14,159	−6.5%
2	Classroom Instruction	7,758	22	8,659	−10.4%
6	Support Services	2,375	58	2,167	9.6%
8	Administrative Cost	1,647	51	1,547	6.5%
10	Operations & Maintenance	1,303	19	1,612	−19.2%
13	Extracurricular Activities	119	64	104	14.4%
16	Median Teacher Salary	56,220	17	61,136
Data from NJDoE 2014 Taxpayers' Guide to Education Spending. *Of K-8 districts with more than 750 students. Lowest spending=1; Highest=84

The Edgewater Park School District is a community public school district that serves students in grades from pre-kindergarten through eighth grade from Edgewater Park, in Burlington County, in the U.S. state of New Jersey.

As of the 2023–24 school year, the district, comprised of two schools, had an enrollment of 1,015 students and 84.0 classroom teachers (on an FTE basis), for a student–teacher ratio of 12.1:1.

The district had been classified by the New Jersey Department of Education as being in District Factor Group "DE", the fifth-highest of eight groupings. District Factor Groups organize districts statewide to allow comparison by common socioeconomic characteristics of the local districts. From lowest socioeconomic status to highest, the categories are A, B, CD, DE, FG, GH, I and J.

For ninth through twelfth grades, public school students attend Burlington City High School in Burlington, as part of a sending/receiving relationship with the City of Burlington Public School District that has existed since the 1930s, in which Edgewater Park students account for almost a third of the high school's enrollment. As of the 2023–24 school year, the high school had an enrollment of 805 students and 74.8 classroom teachers (on an FTE basis), for a student–teacher ratio of 10.8:1.

== Schools ==
Schools in the district (with 2023–24 enrollment data from the National Center for Education Statistics) are:

Elementary school

- Mildred Magowan Elementary School with 563 students in grades PreK–4
  - Shelby Larison, principal

Middle school

- Samuel M. Ridgway Middle School with 416 students in grades 5–8
  - Michael Melvin, principal

== Administration ==
Core members of the district's administration are:

- Pamela Nathan, superintendent
- Nancy Lane, business administrator and board secretary

== Board of education ==
The district's board of education, comprised of nine members, sets policy and oversees the fiscal and educational operation of the district through its administration. As a Type II school district, the board's trustees are elected directly by voters to serve three-year terms of office on a staggered basis, with three seats up for election each year held (since 2012) as part of the November general election. The board appoints a superintendent to oversee the district's day-to-day operations and a business administrator to supervise the business functions of the district.
