= Masonville, New Jersey =

Populated place in Burlington County, New Jersey, US

- Unincorporated community
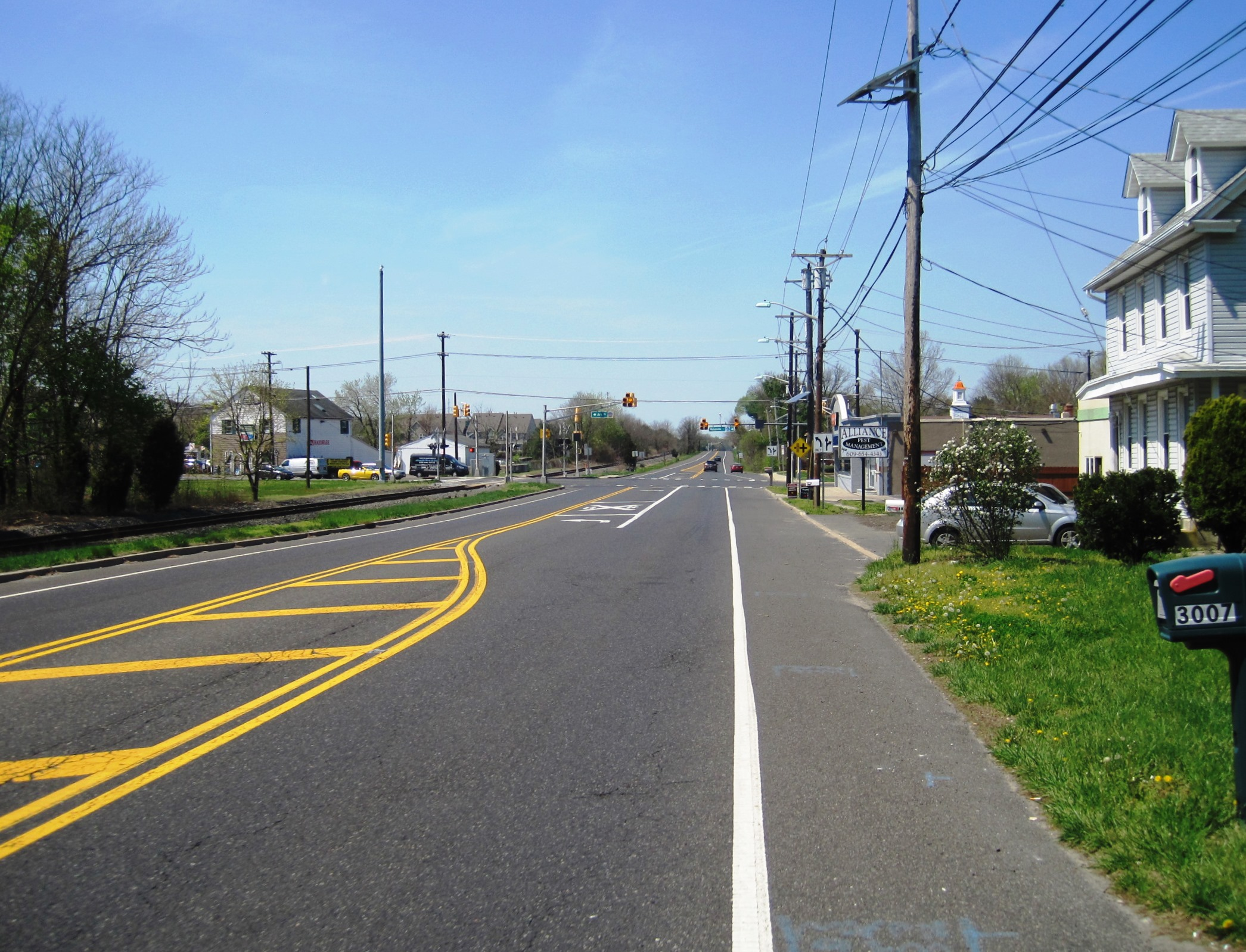

- Location in Burlington County (Inset: Burlington County in New Jersey) Masonville (New Jersey) Masonville (the United States)
- Coordinates: 39°58′42″N 74°52′13″W
- Country: United States
- State: New Jersey
- County: Burlington
- Township: Mount Laurel
- Elevation: 46 ft (14 m)
- ZIP Code: 08054
- GNIS feature ID: 0878179

Masonville is an unincorporated community located within Mount Laurel Township, Burlington County, in the U.S. state of New Jersey. Located east of Moorestown, the community of Masonville was developed when a highway was built in 1794. Major roads in Masonville include County Route 537 and Route 38.

Masonville once had a post office with ZIP Code 08054. It was eventually replaced by the Mount Laurel post office, which was assigned the same ZIP Code and designed to serve a larger area.

== Transportation ==
New Jersey Transit provides bus service to and from Philadelphia on the 413 route.
