= Medford Lakes School District =

School district in Burlington County, New Jersey, US

Address
- 135 Mudjekeewis Trail Medford Lakes, Burlington County, New Jersey, 08055; United States
- Coordinates: 39.865096°N 74.818431°W

District information
- Grades: Pre-K to 8
- Superintendent: Anthony V. Dent
- Business administrator: Nikolas Vrettos
- Schools: 2

Students and staff
- Enrollment: 487 (as of 2023–24)
- Faculty: 46.3 FTEs
- Student–teacher ratio: 10.5:1

Other information
- District Factor Group: I
- Website: www.medford-lakes.k12.nj.us
Ind.	Per pupil	District spending	Rank (*)	K-8 average	%± vs. average
1A	Total Spending	$15,211	4	$18,891	−19.5%
1	Budgetary Cost	12,186	11	14,159	−13.9%
2	Classroom Instruction	7,942	19	8,659	−8.3%
6	Support Services	1,592	14	2,167	−26.5%
8	Administrative Cost	1,433	16	1,547	−7.4%
10	Operations & Maintenance	1,164	11	1,612	−27.8%
13	Extracurricular Activities	55	14	104	−47.1%
16	Median Teacher Salary	54,211	12	61,136
Data from NJDoE 2014 Taxpayers' Guide to Education Spending. *Of K-8 districts with 401-750 students. Lowest spending=1; Highest=64

The Medford Lakes School District is a community public school district that serves students in pre-kindergarten through eighth grade from Medford Lakes, in Burlington County, in the U.S. state of New Jersey.

As of the 2023–24 school year, the district, comprised of two schools, had an enrollment of 487 students and 46.3 classroom teachers (on an FTE basis), for a student–teacher ratio of 10.5:1.

The district had been classified by the New Jersey Department of Education as being in District Factor Group "I", the second-highest of eight groupings. District Factor Groups organize districts statewide to allow comparison by common socioeconomic characteristics of the local districts. From lowest socioeconomic status to highest, the categories are A, B, CD, DE, FG, GH, I and J.

Public school students from Medford Lakes in ninth through twelfth grades attend Shawnee High School, together with students from Medford Township, where the school is located. Shawnee is part of the Lenape Regional High School District, a regional secondary school district in Burlington County that serves the eight municipalities of Evesham Township, Medford Lakes, Medford Township, Mount Laurel, Shamong Township, Southampton Township, Tabernacle Township and Woodland Township at its four high schools. As of the 2023–24 school year, the high school had an enrollment of 1,418 students and 114.0 classroom teachers (on an FTE basis), for a student–teacher ratio of 12.4:1.

== Awards and recognition ==
For the 2005-06 school year, the district was recognized with the "Best Practices Award" by the New Jersey Department of Education for its "Destination America" Social Studies program at Neeta Elementary School.

== Schools ==
Schools in the district (with 2023–24 enrollment data from the National Center for Education Statistics) are:

- Nokomis School with 162 students in grades PreK–2
  - Brianna Chapin, principal
- Neeta School with 325 students in grades 3–8
  - Anthony Dent, principal

== Administration ==
Core members of the district's administration are:

- Anthony V. Dent, superintendent
- Nikolas Vrettos, business administrator and board secretary

== Board of education ==
The district's board of education, comprised of five members, sets policy and oversees the fiscal and educational operation of the district through its administration. As a Type II school district, the board's trustees are elected directly by voters to serve three-year terms of office on a staggered basis, with three seats up for election each year held (since 2012) as part of the November general election. The board appoints a superintendent to oversee the district's day-to-day operations and a business administrator to supervise the business functions of the district.
