= Springfield Township School District (New Jersey) =

School district in Burlington County, New Jersey, US

Address
- 2146 Jacksonville Road Jobstown, Burlington County, New Jersey, 08041; United States
- Coordinates: 40.036162°N 74.694865°W

District information
- Grades: Pre-K to 6
- Superintendent: Brielle Neroda
- Business administrator: Casey DeJoseph
- Schools: 1

Students and staff
- Enrollment: 289 (as of 2023–24)
- Faculty: 22.0 FTEs
- Student–teacher ratio: 13.2:1

Other information
- District Factor Group: FG
- Website: www.springfieldschool.org
Ind.	Per pupil	District spending	Rank (*)	K-6 average	%± vs. average
1A	Total Spending	$18,775	38	$18,891	−0.6%
1	Budgetary Cost	16,529	47	13,649	21.1%
2	Classroom Instruction	9,802	40	8,366	17.2%
6	Support Services	2,795	48	2,161	29.3%
8	Administrative Cost	1,821	41	1,467	24.1%
10	Operations & Maintenance	2,066	48	1,552	33.1%
16	Median Teacher Salary	58,695	33	57,437
Data from NJDoE 2014 Taxpayers' Guide to Education Spending. *Of K-6 districts with any number of students. Lowest spending=1; Highest=59

The Springfield Township School District is a community public school district that serves students in pre-kindergarten through sixth grade from Springfield Township in Burlington County, in the U.S. state of New Jersey.

As of the 2023–24 school year, the district, comprising one school, had an enrollment of 289 students and 22.0 classroom teachers (on an FTE basis), for a student–teacher ratio of 13.2:1.

The district had been classified by the New Jersey Department of Education as being in District Factor Group "FG", the fourth-highest of eight groupings. District Factor Groups organize districts statewide to allow comparison by common socioeconomic characteristics of the local districts. From lowest socioeconomic status to highest, the categories are A, B, CD, DE, FG, GH, I and J.

Public school students in seventh through twelfth grades attend the schools of the Northern Burlington County Regional School District, which also serves students from Chesterfield Township, Mansfield Township, North Hanover Township, along with children of military personnel based at Joint Base McGuire–Dix–Lakehurst. As of the 2023–24 school year, the regional high school district, comprised of two schools, had an enrollment of 2,135 students and 173.5 classroom teachers (on an FTE basis), for a student–teacher ratio of 12.3:1. The schools in the district (with 2023–24 enrollment data from the National Center for Education Statistics) are Northern Burlington County Regional Middle School with 718 students in grades 7–8 and Northern Burlington County Regional High School with 1,381 students in grades 9–12. Both schools are in the Columbus section of Mansfield Township. Using a formula that reflects the population and the value of the assessed property in each of the constituent municipalities, taxpayers in Springfield Township pay 17.7% of the district's tax levy.

== School ==
- Springfield Township School had an enrollment of 225 students in grades PreK–6 as of the 2023–24 school year.

== Administration ==
Core members of the district's administration are:

- Brielle Neroda, superintendent
- Casey DeJoseph, business administrator and board secretary

== Board of education ==
The district's board of education, comprising nine members, sets policy and oversees the fiscal and educational operation of the district through its administration. As a Type II school district, the board's trustees are elected directly by voters to serve three-year terms of office on a staggered basis, with three seats up for election each year held (since 2012) as part of the November general election. The board appoints a superintendent to oversee the district's day-to-day operations and a business administrator to supervise the business functions of the district.
