= Shamong Township School District =

School district in Burlington County, New Jersey, US

Address
- 295 Indian Mills Road Shamong Township, Burlington County, New Jersey, 08088; United States
- Coordinates: 39.817965°N 74.762777°W

District information
- Grades: Pre-K to 8
- Superintendent: Mayreni Fermin-Cannon
- Business administrator: Laura Archer
- Schools: 2

Students and staff
- Enrollment: 669 (as of 2023–24)
- Faculty: 63.0 FTEs
- Student–teacher ratio: 10.6:1

Other information
- District Factor Group: GH
- Website: www.ims.k12.nj.us
Ind.	Per pupil	District spending	Rank (*)	K-8 average	%± vs. average
1A	Total Spending	$16,583	31	$18,891	−12.2%
1	Budgetary Cost	13,425	35	14,159	−5.2%
2	Classroom Instruction	8,325	34	8,659	−3.9%
6	Support Services	1,913	30	2,167	−11.7%
8	Administrative Cost	1,580	46	1,547	2.1%
10	Operations & Maintenance	1,470	38	1,612	−8.8%
13	Extracurricular Activities	137	73	104	31.7%
16	Median Teacher Salary	59,562	28	61,136
Data from NJDoE 2014 Taxpayers' Guide to Education Spending. *Of K-8 districts with more than 750 students. Lowest spending=1; Highest=84

The Shamong Township School District is a community public school district that serves students in pre-kindergarten through eighth grade from Shamong Township, in Burlington County, in the U.S. state of New Jersey.

As of the 2023–24 school year, the district, comprised of two schools, had an enrollment of 669 students and 63.0 classroom teachers (on an FTE basis), for a student–teacher ratio of 10.6:1.

The district had been classified by the New Jersey Department of Education as being in District Factor Group "GH", the third-highest of eight groupings. District Factor Groups organize districts statewide to allow comparison by common socioeconomic characteristics of the local districts. From lowest socioeconomic status to highest, the categories are A, B, CD, DE, FG, GH, I and J.

Public school students in Shamong Township in ninth through twelfth grades attend Seneca High School located in Tabernacle Township, which also serves students from Southampton Township, Tabernacle Township and Woodland Township. The school is part of the Lenape Regional High School District, which also serves students from Evesham Township, Medford Lakes, Medford and Mount Laurel. As of the 2023–24 school year, the high school had an enrollment of 1,037 students and 101.0 classroom teachers (on an FTE basis), for a student–teacher ratio of 10.3:1.

== Schools ==
Schools in the district (with 2023–24 enrollment data from the National Center for Education Statistics) are:

Elementary school

- Indian Mills Elementary School with 351 students in grades PreK–4
  - Nicole Moore, principal

Middle school

- Indian Mills Memorial Middle School with 312 students in grades 5–8
  - Timothy Carroll, principal

== Administration ==
Core members of the district's administration are:

- Mayreni Fermin-Cannon, superintendent
- Laura Archer, business administrator and board secretary

== Board of education ==
The district's board of education, composed of five members, sets policy and oversees the fiscal and educational operation of the district through its administration. As a Type II school district, the board's trustees are elected directly by voters to serve three-year terms of office on a staggered basis, with either one or two seats up for election each year held (since 2012) as part of the November general election. The board appoints a superintendent to oversee the district's day-to-day operations and a business administrator to supervise the business functions of the district.
