= Hainesport Township School District =

School district in Warren County, New Jersey, US

Address
- 211 Broad Street Hainesport Township, Burlington County, New Jersey, 08036; United States
- Coordinates: 39.98645°N 74.828151°W

District information
- Grades: Pre-K to 8
- Superintendent: Joseph R. Corn
- Business administrator: Christopher C. DeSanto
- Schools: 1

Students and staff
- Enrollment: 528 (as of 2022–23)
- Faculty: 57.0 FTEs
- Student–teacher ratio: 9.3:1

Other information
- District Factor Group: FG
- Website: www.hainesport.k12.nj.us
Ind.	Per pupil	District spending	Rank (*)	K-8 average	%± vs. average
1A	Total Spending	$15,645	7	$18,891	−17.2%
1	Budgetary Cost	12,089	10	14,159	−14.6%
2	Classroom Instruction	7,727	14	8,659	−10.8%
6	Support Services	1,900	18	2,167	−12.3%
8	Administrative Cost	1,220	3	1,547	−21.1%
10	Operations & Maintenance	1,090	8	1,612	−32.4%
13	Extracurricular Activities	140	38	104	34.6%
16	Median Teacher Salary	52,227	5	61,136
Data from NJDoE 2014 Taxpayers' Guide to Education Spending. *Of K-8 districts with 401-750 students. Lowest spending=1; Highest=64

The Hainesport Township School District is a community public school district that serves students in pre-kindergarten through eighth grade from Hainesport Township, in Burlington County, in the U.S. state of New Jersey.

As of the 2022–23 school year, the district, comprising one school, had an enrollment of 528 students and 57.0 classroom teachers (on an FTE basis), for a student–teacher ratio of 9.3:1.

The district is classified by the New Jersey Department of Education as being in District Factor Group "FG", the fourth-highest of eight groupings. District Factor Groups organize districts statewide to allow comparison by common socioeconomic characteristics of the local districts. From lowest socioeconomic status to highest, the categories are A, B, CD, DE, FG, GH, I and J.

For ninth through twelfth grades, public school students attend the Rancocas Valley Regional High School, a comprehensive regional public high school serving students from five communities encompassing approximately 40 square miles (100 km^{2}): Eastampton Township, Hainesport Township, Lumberton Township, Mount Holly Township and Westampton Township. As of the 2021–22 school year, the high school had an enrollment of 2,048 students and 140.3 classroom teachers (on an FTE basis), for a student–teacher ratio of 14.6:1. The school is located in Mount Holly Township.

== School ==
- Hainesport School served a total of 550 students in grades PreK-8 in the 2021–22 school year.
  - Julia Wolfrom, principal for Grades PreK-4 / Director of Special Services
  - Ramon Santiago, principal for Grades 5-8 / Director of Curriculum & Instruction

== Administration ==
Core members of the district's administration are:

- Joseph R. Corn, Superintendent
- Christopher C. DeSanto, Business Administrator/Board Secretary

== Board of education ==
The district's board of education is comprised of nine members who set policy and oversee the fiscal and educational operation of the district through its administration. As a Type II school district, the board's trustees are elected directly by voters to serve three-year terms of office on a staggered basis, with three seats up for election each year held (since 2012) as part of the November general election. The board appoints a superintendent to oversee the district's day-to-day operations and a business administrator to supervise the business functions of the district.
