= Lumberton Township School District =

Township in Burlington County, New Jersey, US

Address
- 33 Municipal Drive Lumberton, Burlington County, New Jersey, 08048; United States
- Coordinates: 39.968979°N 74.79713°W

District information
- Grades: Pre-K to 8
- Superintendent: David Cappuccio
- Business administrator: Robert Kraft
- Schools: 3

Students and staff
- Enrollment: 1,223 (as of 2024–25)
- Faculty: 99.3 FTEs
- Student–teacher ratio: 12.3:1

Other information
- District Factor Group: FG
- Website: www.lumberton.k12.nj.us
| Ind. | Per pupil | District spending | Rank (*) | K-8 average | %± vs. average |
|---|---|---|---|---|---|
| 1A | Total Spending | $21,303 | 81 | $18,891 | 12.8% |
| 1 | Budgetary Cost | 13,304 | 31 | 14,159 | −6.0% |
| 2 | Classroom Instruction | 7,865 | 26 | 8,659 | −9.2% |
| 6 | Support Services | 1,964 | 34 | 2,167 | −9.4% |
| 8 | Administrative Cost | 1,743 | 65 | 1,547 | 12.7% |
| 10 | Operations & Maintenance | 1,624 | 52 | 1,612 | 0.7% |
| 13 | Extracurricular Activities | 107 | 53 | 104 | 2.9% |
| 16 | Median Teacher Salary | 65,450 | 68 | 61,136 |
Data from NJDoE 2014 Taxpayers' Guide to Education Spending. *Of K-8 districts with more than 750 students. Lowest spending=1; Highest=84

The Lumberton Township School District is a community public school district that serves students in pre-kindergarten through eighth grade in Lumberton, in Burlington County, in the U.S. state of New Jersey.

As of the 2024–25 school year, the district, comprised of three schools, had an enrollment of 1,223 students and 99.3 classroom teachers (on an FTE basis), for a student–teacher ratio of 12.3:1.

The district is classified by the New Jersey Department of Education as being in District Factor Group "FG", the fourth-highest of eight groupings. District Factor Groups organize districts statewide to allow comparison by common socioeconomic characteristics of the local districts. From lowest socioeconomic status to highest, the categories are A, B, CD, DE, FG, GH, I and J.

For ninth through twelfth grades, public school students attend the Rancocas Valley Regional High School, a comprehensive regional public high school serving students from five communities encompassing approximately 40 square miles (100 km^{2}) comprising the communities of Eastampton Township, Hainesport Township, Lumberton Township, Mount Holly Township and Westampton Township. As of the 2024–25 school year, the high school had an enrollment of 2,002 students and 135.9 classroom teachers (on an FTE basis), for a student–teacher ratio of 14.7:1. Rancocas Valley Regional High School is located in Mount Holly Township.

== History ==
The first public school in Lumberton was established in 1918 with four classrooms.

With an average addition of 80-100 students per year in the late 1990s and a total enrollment of 1,270 students in the 1997-98 school year, Lumberton was one of the most rapidly growing school districts in South Jersey, leading to consideration of options to construct a high school for the district and withdraw from Rancocas Valley Regional.

In 2018, with district enrollment declining by more than 30% since 2002-03, the district decided to close the Florence L. Walther School, which had served students in Kindergarten and first grade, at the end of the 2019-20 school year and reconfigure the grades assigned to the three remaining facilities. As part of the district's reconfiguration plans, Ashbrook Elementary School was closed for renovations in 2019-20 school year. In 2021, the former Florence L. Walther School was leased to Hampton Academy.

== Awards and recognition ==
For the 2005-06 school year, the Lumberton Township School District was recognized with the "Best Practices Award" by the New Jersey Department of Education for its "Payday" Consumer, Family, and Life Skills program at Lumberton Middle School.

Lumberton Middle School was recognized as a New Jersey Star School.

== Schools ==
Schools in the district (with 2024–25 enrollment data from the National Center for Education Statistics) are:

Elementary schools

- Ashbrook Elementary School with 371 students in grades PreK-1 and preschool
  - Jessica Kilgore, principal
- Bobby's Run School with 457 students in grades 2-5
  - Lisely Mendez, principal

Middle school

- Lumberton Middle School with 356 students in grades 6-8
  - Richard Brown, principal

== Administration ==
Core members of the district's administration are:

- Colleen Murray, superintendent
- Robert Kraft, business administrator and board secretary

== Board of education ==
The district's board of education, comprised of nine elected members, sets policy and oversees the fiscal and educational operation of the district through its administration. As a Type II school district, the board's trustees are elected directly by voters to serve three-year terms of office on a staggered basis, with three seats up for election each year held (since 2012) as part of the November general election. The board appoints a superintendent to oversee the district's day-to-day operations and a business administrator to supervise the business functions of the district.
