= City of Burlington Public School District =

School district in Burlington County, New Jersey, US

Address
- 518 Locust Avenue Burlington, Burlington County, New Jersey, 08016; United States
- Coordinates: 40.074723°N 74.858624°W

District information
- Grades: PreK-12
- Superintendent: John Russell
- Business administrator: Ingrid Torres-Walsh
- Schools: 4
- Affiliation: Former Abbott district

Students and staff
- Enrollment: 1,740 (as of 2020–21)
- Faculty: 170.9 FTEs
- Student–teacher ratio: 10.2:1

Other information
- District Factor Group: B
- Website: www.burlington-nj.net
| Ind. | Per pupil | District spending | Rank (*) | K-12 average | %± vs. average |
|---|---|---|---|---|---|
| 1A | Total Spending | $23,393 | 44 | $18,891 | 23.8% |
| 1 | Budgetary Cost | 17,345 | 42 | 14,783 | 17.3% |
| 2 | Classroom Instruction | 9,834 | 43 | 8,763 | 12.2% |
| 6 | Support Services | 3,155 | 44 | 2,392 | 31.9% |
| 8 | Administrative Cost | 1,846 | 39 | 1,485 | 24.3% |
| 10 | Operations & Maintenance | 2,028 | 42 | 1,783 | 13.7% |
| 13 | Extracurricular Activities | 442 | 28 | 268 | 64.9% |
| 16 | Median Teacher Salary | 60,883 | 26 | 64,043 |
Data from NJDoE 2014 Taxpayers' Guide to Education Spending. *Of K-12 districts with up to 1,800 students. Lowest spending=1; Highest=49

The City of Burlington Public School District is a comprehensive community public school district that serves students in pre-Kindergarten through twelfth grade in the City of Burlington, in Burlington County, in the U.S. state of New Jersey. The district is one of 31 former Abbott districts statewide that were established pursuant to the decision by the New Jersey Supreme Court in Abbott v. Burke which are now referred to as "SDA Districts" based on the requirement for the state to cover all costs for school building and renovation projects in these districts under the supervision of the New Jersey Schools Development Authority. As of the 2020–21 school year, the district, comprising four schools, had an enrollment of 1,740 students and 170.9 classroom teachers (on an FTE basis), for a student–teacher ratio of 10.2:1.

The district is classified by the New Jersey Department of Education as being in District Factor Group "B", the second lowest of eight groupings. District Factor Groups organize districts statewide to allow comparison by common socioeconomic characteristics of the local districts. From lowest socioeconomic status to highest, the categories are A, B, CD, DE, FG, GH, I and J.

The district's high school serves as a receiving school for students in grade nine through twelve from Edgewater Park Township, as part of a sending/receiving relationship with the Edgewater Park School District.

== History ==
In 1948, during de jure educational segregation in the United States, the district had two schools for black children.

In 2018, the district closed Elias Boudinot Elementary School, which had served grades K-2, citing declining enrollment, the opportunities to reduce costs and the potential to raise funds by selling the site.

== Awards, recognition and rankings ==
The district was selected as one of the top "100 Best Communities for Music Education in America 2005" by the American Music Conference.

== Schools ==
The schools in the district (with 2020–21 enrollment data from the National Center for Education Statistics) are:

Elementary schools

- Captain James Lawrence Elementary School with 238 students in grades PreK-2
  - Marilyn I. Dunham, principal
- Samuel Smith Elementary School with 281 students in grades PreK-2
  - Marilyn I. Dunham, principal

Intermediate School

- Wilbur Watts Intermediate School with 444 students in grades 3–6
  - Robert Shappell, principal

High school

- Burlington City High School with 727 students in grades 7–12
  - James Flynn, principal

== Administration ==
Members of the district administration are:

- John Russell, superintendent
- Ingrid Torres-Walsh, business administrator and board secretary

== Board of education ==
The district's board of education, comprised of nine members, sets policy and oversees the fiscal and educational operation of the district through its administration. As a Type II school district, the board's trustees are elected directly by voters to serve three-year terms of office on a staggered basis, with three seats up for election each year held (since 2012) as part of the November general election. A tenth representative is appointed by Edgewater Park School District to serve on the City of Burlington board of education. The board appoints a superintendent to oversee the district's day-to-day operations and a business administrator to supervise the business functions of the district.
