= Burlington County, New Jersey =

County in New Jersey, United States

- County
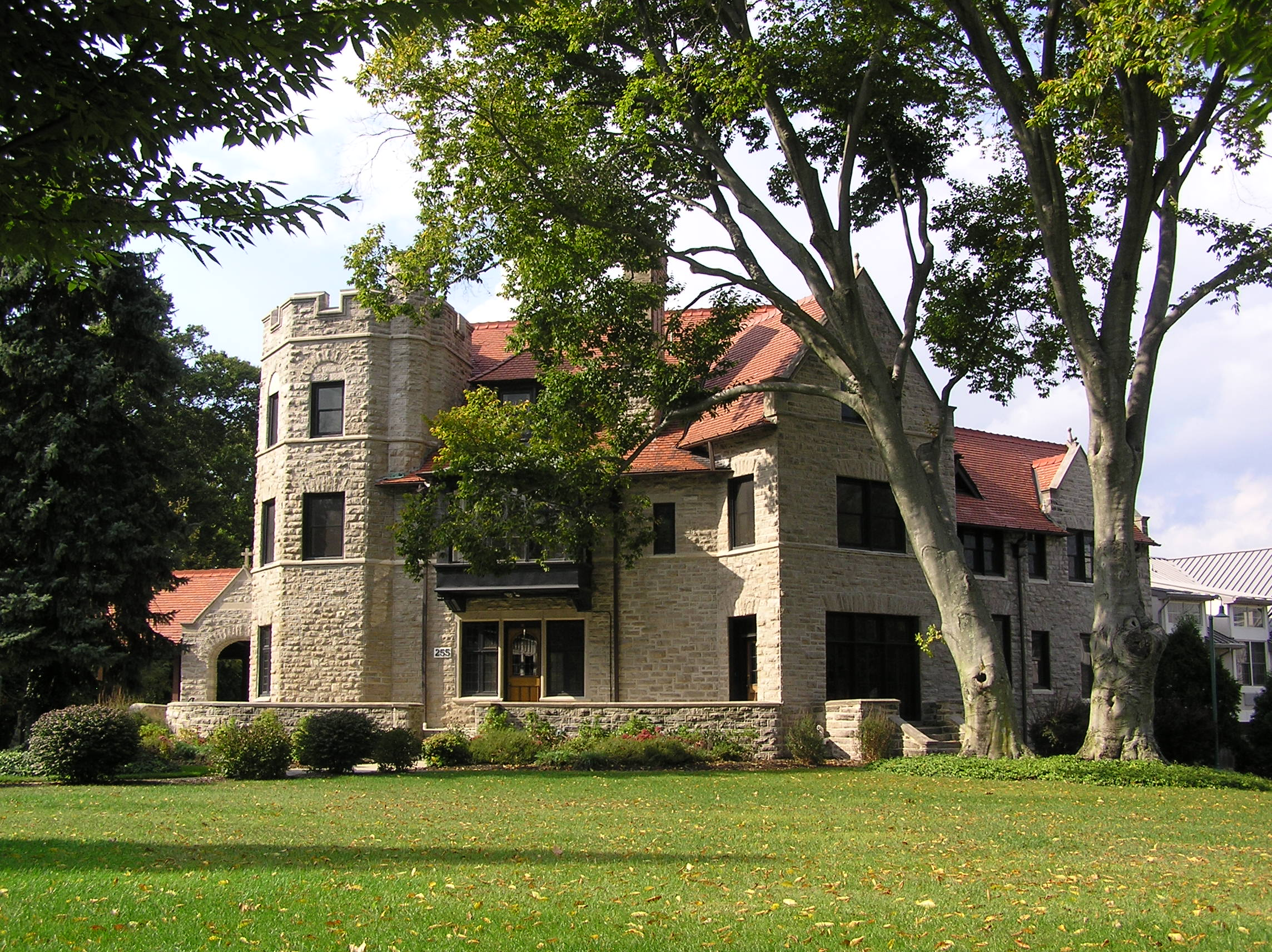
- Breidenhart in Moorestown was listed on the National Register of Historic Places in 1977.

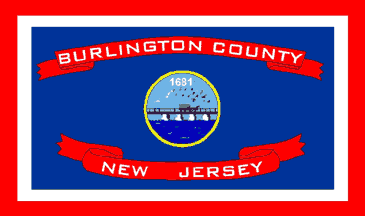
- Flag Seal

- Location within the U.S. state of New Jersey
- Interactive map of Burlington County, New Jersey
- Coordinates: 39.88°N 74.67°W
- Country: United States
- State: New Jersey
- Founded: May 17, 1694
- Named for: Bridlington, England
- Seat: Mount Holly
- Largest municipality: Evesham Township (population); Washington Township (area)

Government
  - Commissioner Director: Felicia Hopson (D, term ends December 31, 2026)

Area
  - Total: 820.19 sq mi (2,124.3 km^{2})
  - Land: 799.29 sq mi (2,070.2 km^{2})
  - Water: 20.89 sq mi (54.1 km^{2}) 2.5%

Population (2020)
  - Total: 461,860
  - Estimate (2025): 481,439 ▲
  - Density: 577.84/sq mi (223.10/km^{2})
- Time zone: UTC−5 (Eastern)
  - Summer (DST): UTC−4 (EDT)
- Congressional districts: 1st, 3rd
- Website: co.burlington.nj.us

Burlington County is a county in the U.S. state of New Jersey. The county is the largest by land area in New Jersey and ranks second behind neighboring Ocean County in total area. Its county seat is Mount Holly. As of the 2020 census, the county was the state's 11th-most-populous county, with a population of 461,860, its highest decennial count ever and an increase of 13,126 (+2.9%) from the 448,734 recorded at the 2010 census, which in turn had reflected an increase of 25,340 (6.0%) from the 423,394 enumerated at the 2000 census. The United States Census Bureau's Population Estimates Program estimated a 2025 population of 481,439, an increase of 19,579 (+4.2%) from the 2020 decennial census. The most populous place in the county was Evesham Township with 46,826 residents as of the 2020 census. Washington Township covered 102.71 square miles (266.0 km^{2}), the largest area of any municipality in the county. The county is part of the South Jersey region of the state.

Burlington County is located east of the Delaware River and borders Philadelphia, the nation's sixth-largest city. It is part of the Philadelphia metropolitan area. However, the county stretches across the state, and its southeast corner reaches tidal estuaries leading to New Jersey's Great Bay, which separates the county from the Atlantic Ocean.

== Etymology ==
Anglo-European records of Burlington County date to 1681, when its court was established in the Province of West Jersey. The county was formed on May 17, 1694, "by the union of the first and second Tenths." The county was named for Bridlington, a town in England.

== History ==
Burlington County, originally the seat of government for the Province of West Jersey, merged with East Jersey in 1702 to form the Province of New Jersey. At its inception, Burlington County was considerably larger but was subsequently partitioned to form additional counties in response to population growth. Specifically, in 1714, a partition to the north led to the creation of Hunterdon County. Hunterdon County itself was further divided over time, resulting in the formation of three additional counties: Morris, Sussex and Warren.

Initially, the county seat was in Burlington. However, as the population began to increase and spread toward the interior of the province, away from the Delaware River, a more central location became necessary. Consequently, the seat of government was relocated to Mount Holly in 1793.

The period of industrialization saw significant improvements in transportation within Burlington County, which in turn enhanced the profitability of its agricultural sector. Concurrently, a population surge in the coastal communities, fueled by flourishing international trade and ship repair industries, necessitated extensive road improvements throughout the county.

== Geography and climate ==
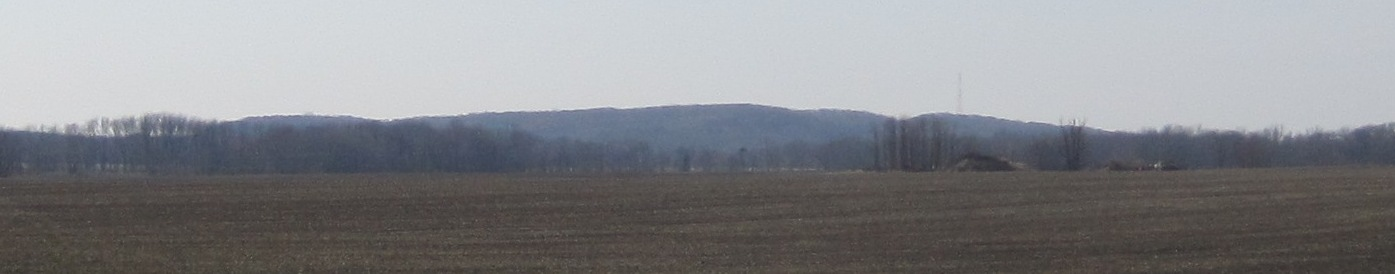
Arney's Mount seen from Saylors Pond Road, also known as County Road 670

According to the United States Census Bureau, as of the 2020 Census, the county had a total area of 820.19 square miles (2,124.3 km^{2}), of which 799.29 square miles (2,070.2 km^{2}) was land (97.5%) and 20.89 square miles (54.1 km^{2}) was water (2.5%).

Most of the county's land is coastal and alluvial plain, with little topographic relief. There are a few anomalous hills, such as Apple Pie Hill and Arney's Mount, the highest of the county and among the highest in South Jersey at approximately 240 feet (73 m) above sea level. The low point is sea level along the Delaware and Mullica rivers.

Most of the land is dotted with rivers, streams, and wetlands. Some of the largest and most important rivers in Burlington County include Rancocas Creek, Assiscunk Creek, Pennsauken Creek, Mullica River, Batsto River, and Wading River.

Mount Holly, New Jersey

Climate chart (precipitation, max. and min. temperature)
J	F	M	A	M	J	J	A	S	O	N	D
3.5 41 22	2.9 45 24	4.4 53 31	4 64 40	4 74 49	4 82 59	4.4 87 64	4.9 85 62	4.1 78 54	3.8 67 43	3.7 57 35	4 45 27
- █ Average max. and min. temperatures in °F
- █ Precipitation totals in inches
- Source: The Weather Channel
Metric conversion
J	F	M	A	M	J	J	A	S	O	N	D
89 5 −6	74 7 −4	112 12 −1	102 18 4	102 23 9	101 28 15	112 31 18	124 29 17	104 26 12	97 19 6	93 14 2	102 7 −3
- █ Average max. and min. temperatures in °C
- █ Precipitation totals in mm

Average temperatures in the county seat of Mount Holly have ranged from a low of 22 °F (−6 °C) in January to a high of 87 °F (31 °C) in July, although a record low of −25 °F (−32 °C) was recorded in February 1934 and a record high of 104 °F (40 °C) was recorded in July 1936. Average monthly precipitation ranged from 2.92 inches (74 mm) in February to 4.87 inches (124 mm) in August. According to the Köppen climate classification, Burlington County has a humid subtropical climate (Cfa), with relatively cool to cold winters and hot summers.

Severe weather is common in the warm months. Hurricanes have struck Burlington County on occasion, but tornadoes are uncommon. Severe thunderstorms, however, are common during the warm season. Snowfall is typical in the winter, with the snowfall averages in the county ranging from about 18 to 22 inches. The nearby Atlantic Ocean moderates Burlington County's climate, and rain is common year-round. The county seat receives about 41 inches of rain per year.

Another weather phenomenon that occurs in Burlington County is radiative cooling in the Pine Barrens, a large pine forest and reserve that takes up a good portion of Southern and Eastern Burlington County. Due to sandy soil, on clear and dry nights these areas might be 10 to 15 °F (−12 to −9 °C) colder than the surrounding areas, and there is a shorter frost-free season in these places. The sandy soil of the Pinelands loses heat much faster than the other soils or urban surfaces (concrete, asphalt) in the region, and so achieves a much lower temperature at night than the rest of the county. This effect is far less pronounced on moist, cloudy, or windy nights, as these three factors greatly reduce the radiative cooling of the sandy soil.

Climate data for {{{location}}}
Month	Jan	Feb	Mar	Apr	May	Jun	Jul	Aug	Sep	Oct	Nov	Dec	Year
Record high °F (°C)	72 (22)	74 (23)	90 (32)	96 (36)	98 (37)	98 (37)	103 (39)	102 (39)	95 (35)	87 (31)	78 (26)	73 (23)	103 (39)
Mean maximum °F (°C)	63 (17)	62 (17)	74 (23)	87 (31)	89 (32)	94 (34)	96 (36)	94 (34)	89 (32)	80 (27)	73 (23)	64 (18)	98 (37)
Mean daily maximum °F (°C)	40 (4)	43.5 (6.4)	52 (11)	63 (17)	73 (23)	81.8 (27.7)	86.5 (30.3)	84.1 (28.9)	77.1 (25.1)	66 (19)	55.5 (13.1)	44.2 (6.8)	63.9 (17.7)
Daily mean °F (°C)	32 (0)	34.6 (1.4)	42.5 (5.8)	52.3 (11.3)	61.8 (16.6)	71 (22)	75.8 (24.3)	73.6 (23.1)	66.1 (18.9)	55.1 (12.8)	46 (8)	36 (2)	53.9 (12.2)
Mean daily minimum °F (°C)	24 (−4)	25.7 (−3.5)	32.9 (0.5)	41.6 (5.3)	50.6 (10.3)	60.1 (15.6)	65.2 (18.4)	63 (17)	55.1 (12.8)	44.3 (6.8)	36.5 (2.5)	27.7 (−2.4)	43.9 (6.6)
Mean minimum °F (°C)	7 (−14)	9 (−13)	17 (−8)	28 (−2)	37 (3)	48 (9)	56 (13)	54 (12)	44 (7)	31 (−1)	22 (−6)	14 (−10)	5 (−15)
Record low °F (°C)	−6 (−21)	−3 (−19)	3 (−16)	23 (−5)	32 (0)	43 (6)	50 (10)	51 (11)	37 (3)	26 (−3)	17 (−8)	2 (−17)	−6 (−21)
Average precipitation inches (mm)	2.89 (73)	2.78 (71)	4.42 (112)	3.70 (94)	4.07 (103)	4.46 (113)	4.78 (121)	4.68 (119)	4.02 (102)	3.26 (83)	3.42 (87)	3.73 (95)	46.21 (1,174)
Average precipitation days	10	11	11	12	12	11	11	11	8	11	9	12	125
Average snowy days	4	5	2	0	0	0	0	0	0	0	0	2	15
Source 1:
Source 2:

== Demographics ==
Historical population
Census	Pop.	Note	%±
1790	18,095		—
1800	21,521		18.9%
1810	24,979		16.1%
1820	28,822		15.4%
1830	31,107		7.9%
1840	32,831		5.5%
1850	43,203		31.6%
1860	49,730		15.1%
1870	53,639		7.9%
1880	55,402		3.3%
1890	58,528		5.6%
1900	58,241	*	−0.5%
1910	66,565		14.3%
1920	81,770		22.8%
1930	93,541		14.4%
1940	97,013		3.7%
1950	135,910		40.1%
1960	224,499		65.2%
1970	323,132		43.9%
1980	362,542		12.2%
1990	395,066		9.0%
2000	423,394		7.2%
2010	448,734		6.0%
2020	461,860		2.9%
2025 (est.)	481,439		4.2%
Historical sources: 1790-1990; 1970-2010 2010 2020 * = Lost territory in previous decade.

=== 2020 census ===
As of the 2020 census, the county had a population of 461,860. The median age was 41.6 years. About 20.9% of residents were under the age of 18 and 17.7% of residents were 65 years of age or older. For every 100 females there were 95.9 males, and for every 100 females age 18 and over there were 93.9 males age 18 and over. Additionally, 90.2% of residents lived in urban areas, while 9.8% lived in rural areas.

The racial makeup of the county was 65.6% White, 16.8% Black or African American, 0.3% American Indian and Alaska Native, 5.7% Asian, 0.1% Native Hawaiian and Pacific Islander, 3.5% from some other race, and 8.1% from two or more races. Hispanic or Latino residents of any race comprised 8.7% of the population.

There were 174,560 households in the county, of which 30.6% had children under the age of 18 living with them and 27.3% had a female householder with no spouse or partner present. About 25.6% of all households were made up of individuals and 11.4% had someone living alone who was 65 years of age or older. The average household size was 2.55 and the average family size was 3.08.

There were 184,775 housing units, of which 5.5% were vacant. Among occupied housing units, 73.8% were owner-occupied and 26.2% were renter-occupied. The homeowner vacancy rate was 1.6% and the rental vacancy rate was 7.0%.

The county's median household income was $88,797, and the median family income was $105,488. About 5.5% of the population were below the poverty line, including 8.5% of those under age 18 and 4.5% of those age 65 or over.

=== Racial and ethnic composition ===
Burlington County, New Jersey – Racial and ethnic composition Note: the US Census treats Hispanic/Latino as an ethnic category. This table excludes Latinos from the racial categories and assigns them to a separate category. Hispanics/Latinos may be of any race.
Race / Ethnicity (NH = Non-Hispanic)	Pop 1980	Pop 1990	Pop 2000	Pop 2010	Pop 2020	% 1980	% 1990	% 2000	% 2010	% 2020
White alone (NH)	302,486	318,109	323,171	317,021	294,510	83.43%	80.52%	76.33%	70.65%	63.77%
Black or African American alone (NH)	44,758	55,063	62,476	71,247	74,807	12.35%	13.94%	14.76%	15.88%	16.20%
Native American or Alaska Native alone (NH)	516	866	739	656	609	0.14%	0.22%	0.17%	0.15%	0.13%
Asian alone (NH)	4,513	7,824	11,281	19,193	25,980	1.24%	1.98%	2.66%	4.28%	5.63%
Native Hawaiian or Pacific Islander alone (NH)	x	x	110	193	265	x	x	0.03%	0.04%	0.06%
Other race alone (NH)	1,611	385	791	1,471	3,235	0.44%	0.10%	0.19%	0.33%	0.70%
Mixed race or Multiracial (NH)	x	x	7,194	10,122	22,067	x	x	1.70%	2.26%	4.78%
Hispanic or Latino (any race)	8,658	12,819	17,632	28,831	40,387	2.39%	3.24%	4.16%	6.42%	8.74%
Total	362,542	395,066	423,394	448,734	461,860	100.00%	100.00%	100.00%	100.00%	100.00%

=== 2010 census ===
The 2010 United States census counted 448,734 people, 166,318 households, and 117,254 families in the county. The population density was 561.9 inhabitants per square mile (217.0/km^{2}). There were 175,615 housing units at an average density of 219.9 per square mile (84.9/km^{2}). The racial makeup was 73.84% (331,342) White, 16.60% (74,505) Black or African American, 0.22% (985) Native American, 4.32% (19,395) Asian, 0.05% (219) Pacific Islander, 2.05% (9,193) from other races, and 2.92% (13,095) from two or more races. Hispanic or Latino of any race were 6.42% (28,831) of the population.

== Economy ==
The Bureau of Economic Analysis calculated that the county's gross domestic product was $27.4 billion in 2021, which was ranked 10th in the state and was a 5.9% increase from the prior year.

In 2015, the county had a per capita personal income of $55,227, the tenth-highest in New Jersey and ranked 228th of 3,113 counties in the United States. The Bureau of Economic Analysis ranked the county as having the 158th-highest per capita income of all 3,113 counties in the United States (and the 11th-highest in New Jersey) as of 2009.

== Government ==
=== County government ===
Burlington County is governed by a Board of County Commissioners comprised of five members who are chosen at-large in partisan elections to serve three-year terms of office on a staggered basis, with either one or two seats coming up for election each year; at an annual reorganization meeting, the board selects a director and deputy director from among its members to serve a one-year term. Burlington County Board of County Commissioners have both administrative and policy-making powers, with each commissioner assigned to oversee a particular area of service. As of 2026, Burlington County's Commissioners are: Director Felicia Hopson (D, Willingboro Township, term as commissioner ends December 31, 2027; term as director ends 2026), Deputy Director Allison Eckel (D, Medford, term as commissioner ends 2028; term as deputy director ends 2026), Randy Brolo (D, Lumberton, 2026; elected to an unexpired term), Tyler Burrell (D, Delran Township, 2027) and Tom Pullion (D, Edgewater Park, 2026).

Pursuant to Article VII Section II of the New Jersey State Constitution, each county in New Jersey is required to have three elected administrative officials known as "constitutional officers." These officers are the County Clerk and County Surrogate (both elected for five-year terms of office) and the County Sheriff (elected for a three-year term). Burlington County's Constitutional Officers are Clerk Joanne Schwartz (D, Southampton Township, 2028), Sheriff James H. Kostoplis (D, Bordentown, 2028) and Surrogate Brian J. Carlin (D, Burlington Township, 2026).

The Burlington County Prosecutor is LaChia L. Bradshaw of the Columbus section of Mansfield Township who was nominated by Governor of New Jersey Phil Murphy and sworn into office in July 2022 after confirmation by the New Jersey Senate. Burlington County constitutes Vicinage 3 of the New Jersey Superior Court and is seated at the Burlington County Courts Facility and County Office Building in Mount Holly, with additional space in the Olde Courthouse and Rancocas Building, also in Mount Holly; the Assignment Judge for the county is Terrence R. Cook.

In the 2012 general election, Democrats Aimee Belgard and Joanne Schwartz won the election as Freeholders (since renamed as Commissioners) over Republican incumbents Bruce Garganio and Mary Ann O'Brien, despite being outspent by a six-to-one margin. However, in 2014, both Garganio and O'Brien were successful in winning back seats on the Freeholder board, while Aimee Belgard lost her bid for U.S. Congress, losing the popular vote in both Ocean and Burlington counties. In 2015, Republican newcomers Kate Gibbs and Ryan Peters ousted Belgard and Schwartz, again giving the Republican Party full control on the Freeholder Board. In 2017, Democratic newcomers Tom Pullion and Balvir Singh defeated Republican incumbents Bruce Garganio and Linda Hughes, winning the county election for Democrats for the first time in a non-presidential election year in decades.

In 2018, Democrat Joanne Schwartz defeated Republican incumbent Tim Tyler in the County Clerk election. In the freeholder elections, Democrats Felicia Hopson and George Youngkin defeated Republican incumbents Kate Gibbs and Linda Hughes. This gave Democrats a 4-1 majority, gaining control of the Freeholder Board for the first time since 1975. George Youngkin won despite having suspended his campaign due to a past domestic violence charge that was later dropped. He resigned on January 2, the day after being sworn in. Democrats appointed Daniel J. O’Connell to replace him, until a special election could be held on November 5, 2019. In 2019, Democrat Anthony Basantis defeated Republican Michael Ditzel in the Sheriff election, replacing retired Republican Sheriff Jean Stanfield, who was elected to the State Assembly. In the regular election for one freeholder position, Democrat Linda A. Hynes defeated Republican Incumbent Latham Tiver. In the special election for the remaining 2 years of George Youngkin's term, incumbent Democrat Daniel J. O'Connell, who had originally been appointed to the seat, defeated Republican Lee Schneider. The election gave Democrats control over every county-wide office, except the Surrogate, which they won in 2021. Republicans have not won a county-wide race since 2016. However, the majority of Burlington County's state legislators are still Republicans.

In April 2022, Allison Eckel was appointed to fill the seat expiring in December 2022 that became vacant after Linda Hynes resigned to take office as a New Jersey Superior Court judge. The following month, Burlington County Republicans filed suit, claiming that Eckel should be removed from office and the seat left vacant until November 2022, because the statutory timeline for the appointment was not followed.

In March 2025, Randy Brolo was appointed to fill the seat expiring in December 2026 that had been held by Balvir Singh until he stepped down to take office in the New Jersey General Assembly representing the 7th Legislative District. Brolo served on an interim basis until the November 2025 general election, when he was elected to serve the balance of the term of office.

=== Federal representatives ===
Two federal Congressional districts cover the county. Most of the county is in the 3rd District, with a sliver in the west being in the 1st District. For the 119th United States Congress, New Jersey's 1st congressional district is represented by Donald Norcross (D, Camden). For the 119th United States Congress, New Jersey's 3rd congressional district is currently represented Herb Conaway (D, Delran Township).

=== State representatives ===
The 40 municipalities of Burlington County are part of four separate legislative districts.

District	Senator	Assembly	Municipalities
6th	James Beach (D)	Louis Greenwald (D) Melinda Kane (D)	Maple Shade Township. The remainder of this district covers portions of Camden County.
7th	Troy Singleton (D)	Balvir Singh (D) Carol Murphy (D)	Beverly, Bordentown City, Bordentown Township, Burlington City, Burlington Township, Cinnaminson Township, Delanco Township, Delran Township, Edgewater Park, Fieldsboro, Florence Township, Moorestown, Mount Laurel, Palmyra Borough, Riverside, Riverton and Willingboro.
8th	Latham Tiver (R)	Andrea Katz (D) Anthony Angelozzi (D)	Bass River Township, Chesterfield Township, Eastampton Township, Evesham Township, Hainesport Township, Lumberton, Mansfield Township, Medford, Medford Lakes, Mount Holly, New Hanover, Pemberton Borough, Pemberton Township, Shamong Township, Southampton Township, Springfield Township, Tabernacle Township, Washington Township, Westampton, Woodland Township, and Wrightstown. The remainder of this district covers portions of Atlantic County.
12th	Owen Henry (R)	Alex Sauickie (R) Robert D. Clifton (R)	North Hanover Township. The remainder of this district covers portions of Middlesex County, Monmouth County and Ocean County.

=== Law enforcement ===
The Burlington County Sheriff's Department is headed by a sheriff elected to a three-year term. The sheriff is James H. Kostoplis, elected in 2023. It is a member of the New York-New Jersey Regional Fugitive Task Force. The department has an Administrative Bureau, Operations Bureau and a Courts Bureau. An Undersheriff heads the Administrative Bureau and includes a Chief Warrant Officer, Sheriff's Lieutenant, two Sheriff's Sergeants, Sheriff's Officers and a cadre of civilian staff. The Administrative Bureau includes Community Outreach, Recruiting, Civil Process, and Internal Affairs. The Operations Bureau is headed by an undersheriff and includes a Sheriff's Sergeant. The Operations Bureau includes the Warrant/Fugitive Section, K9 Operations, Patrol, Emergency Services Unit (ESU), and Special Operations. The Courts Division is headed by an undersheriff and includes a sheriff's officer, a lieutenant, two sergeants and Sheriff's officers. This section provides security to the courts and the State Judiciary. Notable former sheriffs include William Norton Shinn (1825-1828), Samuel A. Dobbins (1854-1857), and Jean Stanfield (2001-2019).

The county is also home to the majority of 42,000-acre (17,000 ha) megabase, Joint Base McGuire-Dix-Lakehurst, the entire Air Force Activity / Headquarters of JB MDL McGuire Air Force Base, and all of the main portions of the Army Support Activity, Fort Dix and most training grounds/shooting ranges lie within the county borders in New Hanover, North Hanover, Pemberton, and Springfield townships.

== Politics ==
United States presidential election results for Burlington County, New Jersey
Year	Republican		Democratic		Third party(ies)	
Year	No.	%	No.	%	No.	%
1896	9,371	63.70%	4,610	31.33%	731	4.97%
1900	8,394	57.60%	5,555	38.12%	624	4.28%
1904	8,655	59.91%	4,962	34.35%	830	5.75%
1908	9,019	57.17%	6,273	39.76%	485	3.07%
1912	3,967	28.33%	5,592	39.93%	4,445	31.74%
1916	8,803	56.36%	6,535	41.84%	282	1.81%
1920	17,898	68.73%	7,532	28.92%	611	2.35%
1924	21,617	70.23%	7,794	25.32%	1,369	4.45%
1928	30,224	73.19%	10,972	26.57%	98	0.24%
1932	23,623	58.14%	15,824	38.95%	1,182	2.91%
1936	18,644	41.29%	26,095	57.78%	420	0.93%
1940	21,161	44.20%	26,574	55.50%	143	0.30%
1944	18,765	45.26%	22,623	54.57%	72	0.17%
1948	21,183	49.92%	20,801	49.02%	448	1.06%
1952	30,202	54.18%	25,482	45.71%	60	0.11%
1956	38,145	61.06%	24,258	38.83%	68	0.11%
1960	42,112	51.65%	39,321	48.22%	106	0.13%
1964	31,215	35.09%	57,638	64.80%	92	0.10%
1968	46,177	46.29%	41,651	41.76%	11,919	11.95%
1972	70,805	61.97%	41,520	36.34%	1,935	1.69%
1976	60,960	48.07%	63,309	49.92%	2,551	2.01%
1980	68,415	51.94%	50,083	38.03%	13,211	10.03%
1984	89,815	60.83%	57,467	38.92%	377	0.26%
1988	87,416	58.30%	61,140	40.77%	1,393	0.93%
1992	63,709	36.75%	72,845	42.02%	36,803	21.23%
1996	57,337	35.00%	85,086	51.94%	21,386	13.06%
2000	72,254	40.70%	99,506	56.05%	5,781	3.26%
2004	95,936	46.13%	110,411	53.09%	1,609	0.77%
2008	89,626	40.05%	131,219	58.64%	2,930	1.31%
2012	87,401	40.40%	126,377	58.42%	2,561	1.18%
2016	89,272	40.34%	121,725	55.01%	10,286	4.65%
2020	103,345	39.52%	154,595	59.12%	3,557	1.36%
2024	94,116	41.02%	132,275	57.64%	3,075	1.34%

While historically a swing county in federal elections until the 1990s, in state and local politics, Burlington County was a bastion of moderate suburban conservatism into the mid-2010s, however since the victory of Donald Trump in the 2016 Presidential election, Burlington County has become reliably Democratic on all levels in recent years, including in more affluent communities that have developed new residential areas, such as Medford, Mount Laurel, Moorestown, and Evesham Township that once leaned more to the Republicans (as opposed to areas along the Delaware River occupied by minority and working-class households). Burlington County has closely matched statewide totals in recent presidential, senatorial, and gubernatorial elections, making it an important bellwether.

As of October 1, 2021, there were a total of 353,613 registered voters in Burlington County, of whom 139,745 (39.5%) were registered as Democrats, 90,754 (25.7%) were registered as Republicans and 118,992 (33.7%) were registered as unaffiliated. There were 4,122 voters (1.2%) registered to other parties. Among the county's 2010 Census population, 65.2% were registered to vote, included 76.8% of those ages 18 and over.

Senate Class 1 election results

United States Senate election results for Burlington County, New Jersey1
Year	Republican		Democratic		Third party(ies)	
Year	No.	%	No.	%	No.	%
2024	83,225	37.52%	134,884	60.80%	3,722	1.68%
2018	82,240	43.96%	98,749	52.78%	6,111	3.27%
2012	82,374	40.13%	121,211	59.05%	1,670	0.81%
2006	58,725	46.21%	65,788	51.76%	2,577	2.03%
2000	83,840	50.85%	80,119	48.59%	929	0.56%
1994	47,974	46.87%	50,473	49.31%	3,912	3.82%
1988	68,657	47.32%	75,513	52.04%	929	0.64%
1982	48,215	49.60%	48,035	49.41%	958	0.99%

Senate Class 2 election results

United States Senate election results for Burlington County, New Jersey2
Year	Republican		Democratic		Third party(ies)	
Year	No.	%	No.	%	No.	%
2020	102,136	39.97%	150,160	58.76%	3,250	1.27%
2014	52,721	44.23%	64,730	54.30%	1,755	1.47%
2013	34,224	44.02%	42,543	54.72%	984	1.27%
2008	85,841	42.12%	114,781	56.32%	3,191	1.57%
2002	54,846	46.13%	61,476	51.71%	2,563	2.16%
1996	66,450	44.92%	73,517	49.70%	7,957	5.38%
1990	46,287	48.67%	46,912	49.33%	1,901	2.00%
1984	50,653	35.96%	89,463	63.52%	737	0.52%

=== State elections ===
Governor election results

Gubernatorial election results for Burlington County, New Jersey
Year	Republican		Democratic		Third party(ies)	
Year	No.	%	No.	%	No.	%
2025	75,342	39.02%	116,774	60.47%	986	0.51%
2021	71,772	46.14%	82,877	53.28%	898	0.58%
2017	52,191	41.85%	70,453	56.49%	2,070	1.66%
2013	79,220	62.34%	46,161	36.32%	1,698	1.34%
2009	66,723	48.41%	63,114	45.79%	8,002	5.81%
2005	57,908	45.41%	64,421	50.51%	5,203	4.08%
2001	48,098	42.48%	62,697	55.37%	2,437	2.15%
1997	55,523	43.48%	60,690	47.53%	11,485	8.99%
1993	59,760	48.66%	59,095	48.12%	3,951	3.22%
1989	38,774	36.00%	67,600	62.76%	1,345	1.25%
1985	56,573	68.70%	25,078	30.45%	696	0.85%
1981	45,949	46.24%	52,421	52.75%	1,006	1.01%
1977	31,378	35.05%	55,991	62.55%	2,143	2.39%
1973	23,319	30.41%	52,273	68.17%	1,084	1.41%
1969	48,240	60.93%	30,005	37.90%	933	1.18%
1965	30,666	45.79%	35,468	52.96%	843	1.26%
1961	27,331	46.76%	30,756	52.62%	359	0.61%
1957	23,397	43.64%	30,175	56.28%	41	0.08%
1953	20,403	46.63%	23,236	53.11%	114	0.26%

== Municipalities ==
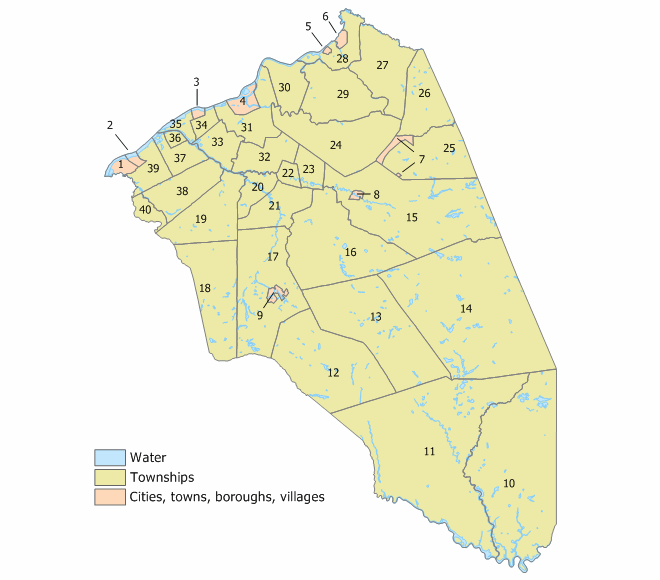
Map of Burlington County municipalities (click to see index key)

Interactive map of municipalities in Burlington County.

Municipalities have their own municipal courts, which handle traffic and minor criminal and civil matters, and the New Jersey Superior Court handles more serious cases. The 40 municipalities in Burlington County (with 2010 Census data for population, housing units, and area) are:

Municipality	Map key	Mun. type	Pop.	Housing units	Total area	Water area	Land area	Pop. density	Housing density	School district	Communities
Bass River; Township	10	township	1,355	587	78.27	3.22	75.04	19.2	7.8	Pinelands (7-12); Bass River (PK-6)	Harrisville; New Gretna CDP (390)
Beverly	3	city	2,499	1,086	0.78	0.23	0.55	4,645.4	1,957.7	Palmyra (S/R) (9-12); Beverly (PK-8)	
Bordentown	6	city	3,993	2,014	0.97	0.04	0.93	4,222.3	2,167.1	Bordentown	
Bordentown; Township	28	township	11,791	4,360	9.33	0.82	8.51	1,335.0	512.1	Bordentown	
Burlington	4	city	9,743	4,223	3.78	0.72	3.06	3,239.1	1,378.9	Burlington City	
Burlington; Township	31	township	23,983	8,105	13.98	0.56	13.42	1,684.2	604.2	Burlington Township	
Chesterfield; Township	27	township	9,422	1,601	21.52	0.19	21.33	360.9	75.0	Northern Burlco (7-12); Chesterfield (PK-6)	Crosswicks CDP (849); Davisville
Cinnaminson; Township	39	township	17,064	5,758	8.06	0.56	7.50	2,074.5	767.2	Cinnaminson	
Delanco	35	township	4,824	1,853	3.35	0.99	2.36	1,817.9	786.5	Riverside (S/R) (9-12); Delanco (K-8)	
Delran; Township	37	township	17,882	6,442	7.21	0.62	6.59	2,563.4	977.4	Delran	Bridgeboro
Eastampton; Township	23	township	6,191	2,380	5.83	0.08	5.75	1,055.6	414.0	Rancocas Valley (9-12); Eastampton (K-8)	
Edgewater Park	34	township	8,930	3,926	3.04	0.15	2.89	3,068.8	1,356.6	Burlington City (S/R) (9-12); Edgewater Park (PK-8)	
Evesham; Township	18	township	46,826	18,303	29.71	0.42	29.28	1,555.1	625.0	Lenape (9-12); Evesham (PK-8)	Cropwell; Marlton CDP (10,594)
Fieldsboro	5	borough	526	221	0.27	0.00	0.27	2,007.7	821.7	Bordentown	
Florence; Township	30	township	12,812	5,053	10.18	0.40	9.78	1,238.1	516.6	Florence	Florence CDP (4,704); Roebling CDP (3,585)
Hainesport	20	township	6,035	2,305	6.72	0.26	6.46	945.9	356.8	Rancocas Valley (9-12); Hainesport (PK-8)	
Lumberton	21	township	12,803	4,719	13.06	0.13	12.92	971.7	365.1	Rancocas Valley (9-12); Lumberton (PK-8)	Eayrestown; Fostertown
Mansfield; Township	29	township	8,897	3,529	21.91	0.17	21.74	393.0	162.3	Northern Burlco (7-12); Mansfield (PK-6)	Columbus; Georgetown; Hedding; Kinkora
Maple Shade; Township	40	township	19,980	9,186	3.82	0.00	3.82	5,006.1	2,403.7	Maple Shade	
Medford	17	township	24,497	8,652	39.93	1.01	38.92	591.8	222.3	Lenape (9-12); Medford (PK-8)	Chairville
Medford Lakes	9	borough	4,264	1,543	1.29	0.13	1.16	3,569.5	1,328.4	Lenape (9-12); Medford Lakes (PK-8)	
Moorestown	38	township	21,355	7,862	14.92	0.23	14.69	1,410.6	535.1	Moorestown	Moorestown-Lenola CDP (14,240)
Mount Holly	22	township	9,981	3,861	2.85	0.05	2.81	3,397.9	1,375.8	Rancocas Valley (9-12); Mount Holly (K-8)	
Mount Laurel	19	township	44,633	18,249	21.97	0.28	21.69	1,930.0	841.3	Lenape (9-12); Mount Laurel (PK-8)	Fellowship; Hartford; Masonville; Ramblewood CDP (6,655); Rancocas Woods
New Hanover; Township	25	township	6,367	613	22.40	0.22	22.18	333.0	27.6	Bordentown (S/R) (9-12); New Hanover (PK-8)	Cookstown CDP (900); Fort Dix CDP (part; 5,951); McGuire Air Force Base CDP (part; 737)
North Hanover; Township	26	township	7,963	3,370	17.42	0.14	17.28	444.2	195.0	Northern Burlco (7-12); North Hanover (PK-6)	Arneytown; Jacobstown; McGuire Air Force Base CDP (part; 2,973)
Palmyra	1	borough	7,438	3,392	2.55	0.69	1.86	3,968.4	1,819.5	Palmyra	
Pemberton Borough	8	borough	1,371	642	0.60	0.02	0.58	2,408.7	1,097.5	Pemberton Township (S/R)	
Pemberton; Township	15	township	26,903	10,749	62.50	1.22	61.28	455.5	175.4	Pemberton Township	Birmingham; Browns Mills CDP (10,734); Browns Mills Junction; Comical Corner; Country Lake Estates CDP (4,054); Fort Dix CDP (part; 1,765); New Lisbon; Ong's Hat; Pemberton Heights CDP (2,485); Presidential Lakes Estates CDP (2,353)
Riverside; Township	36	township	8,003	3,147	1.61	0.12	1.49	5,425.9	2,113.5	Riverside	
Riverton	2	borough	2,764	1,112	0.97	0.30	0.66	4,179.4	1,672.3	Palmyra (S/R) (9-12); Riverton (K-8)	
Shamong; Township	12	township	6,460	2,227	44.99	0.60	44.39	146.2	50.2	Lenape (9-12); Shamong (K-8)	Atsion; High Crossing
Southampton; Township	16	township	10,317	5,024	44.22	0.56	43.67	239.6	115.1	Lenape (9-12); Southampton (K-8)	Beaverville; Buddtown; Burrs Mill; Chairville; Ewansville; Leisuretowne CDP (3,842); Retreat; Vincentown CDP (535)
Springfield; Township	24	township	3,245	1,217	30.00	0.06	29.94	114.0	40.6	Northern Burlco (7-12); Springfield (K-6)	Arneys Mount; Fort Dix CDP (part); Jacksonville; Juilustown CDP (362); Jobstown CDP (360)
Tabernacle; Township	13	township	6,776	2,445	49.61	0.49	49.12	141.5	49.8	Lenape (9-12); Tabernacle (PK-8)	
Washington; Township	11	township	693	284	102.71	3.18	99.52	6.9	2.9	Greater Egg Harbor (S/R) (9-12); Washington (PK-8)	Batsto; Green Bank
Westampton	32	township	9,121	3,291	11.19	0.17	11.03	799.4	298.5	Rancocas Valley (9-12); Westampton (K-8)	Rancocas; Timbuctoo
Willingboro; Township	33	township	31,889	11,442	8.15	0.41	7.74	4,087.3	1,478.6	Willingboro	
Woodland; Township	14	township	1,544	494	96.39	1.83	94.56	18.9	5.2	Lenape (9-12); Woodland (PK-8)	Bullock; Chatsworth
Wrightstown	7	borough	720	348	1.77	0.00	1.77	453.6	196.8	Bordentown (S/R) (9-12); New Hanover (PK-8)	
Burlington County		county	461,860	175,615	819.84	21.26	798.58	561.9	219.9		

=== Historical municipalities ===
- Randolph Township (1870-1893)

== Education ==
=== Tertiary education ===
Rowan College at Burlington County is a two-year public community college serving students from Burlington County. The school, located at campuses in Mount Laurel and Mount Holly, was founded in 1966 and opened to students in 1969.

=== K-12 schools ===
School districts in Burlington County include:

K-12:

- Bordentown Regional School District
- Burlington County Special Services School District
- Burlington Township School District
- Cinnaminson Township Public Schools
- City of Burlington Public School District
- Delran Township School District
- Florence Township School District
- Maple Shade School District
- Moorestown Township Public Schools
- Palmyra Public Schools
- Pemberton Township School District
- Riverside School District
- Willingboro Public Schools

Secondary

- Burlington County Institute of Technology
- Lenape Regional School District
- Northern Burlington Regional School District
- Pinelands Regional School District
- Rancocas Valley Regional School District

Elementary

- Beverly City Schools
- Chesterfield School District
- Delanco Township School District
- Eastampton Township School District
- Edgewater Park School District
- Evesham Township School District
- Hainesport Township School District
- Lumberton Township School District
- Mansfield Public Schools
- Medford Lakes School District
- Medford Township Public Schools
- Mount Holly Township Public Schools
- Mount Laurel Schools
- New Hanover Township School District
- North Hanover Township School District
- Riverton School District
- Shamong Township School District
- Southampton Township Schools
- Springfield Township School District
- Tabernacle School District
- Westampton Township Schools
- Woodland Township School District

Non-operating

- Bass River Township School District
- Washington Township School District

The U.S. Census Bureau lists Joint Base McGuire-Dix-Lakehurst in Burlington County as having its own school district. Students attend area school district public schools, as the Department of Defense Education Activity (DoDEA) does not operate any schools on that base. Students on-post in the McGuire and Dix areas (McGuire Air Force Base and Fort Dix) may attend one of the following in their grade levels, with all siblings in a family taking the same choice: North Hanover Township (for elementary), Northern Burlington County Regional (for secondary), and Pemberton Township (for K-12).

=== Libraries ===
The Burlington County Library became the first county library in New Jersey when it was established in 1921 in Mount Holly. Library service grew in popularity and several moves ensued as more space became a necessity. By 1971, a new headquarters facility had been constructed, Cinnaminson Township and Bordentown had joined the system as branches, and a bookmobile visited areas without local facilities. Medford and Evesham Township had joined the system by 1975. The Pemberton Township Branch joined the system in 1987. Maple Shade Township became a branch in April 2001 while Riverton, the newest branch, joined in December 2003. With a larger network of nine additional member libraries, the system provides a range of services to its residents.

== Transportation ==
=== Roads and highways ===
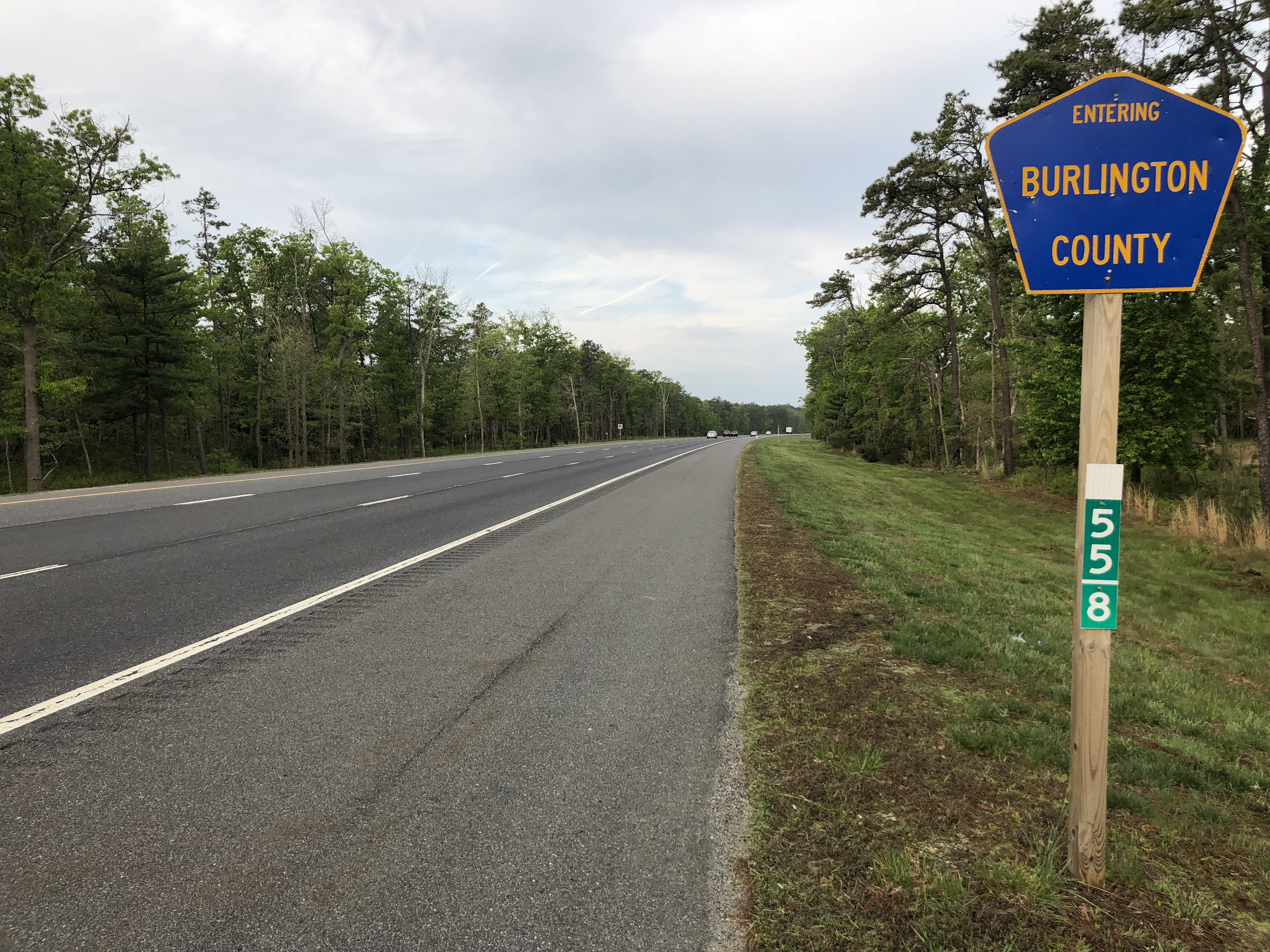
Garden State Parkway entering Burlington County from the south

As of May 2010, the county had a total of 2,609.74 miles (4,199.97 km) of roadways, of which 1,913.83 miles (3,080.01 km) were maintained by the local municipality, 504.18 miles (811.40 km) by Burlington County, 154.01 miles (247.86 km) by the New Jersey Department of Transportation, 0.93 miles (1.50 km) by the Burlington County Bridge Commission and 36.61 miles (58.92 km) by the New Jersey Turnpike Authority.

A variety of major routes were constructed through Burlington County. Major county roads include County Route 528, County Route 530, County Route 532, County Route 534 (only in Shamong Township), County Route 537, County Route 541, County Route 542, County Route 543, County Route 544, County Route 545 and County Route 563. State Routes that pass through are Route 38, Route 68, Route 70, Route 72, Route 73, Route 90 (only in Cinnaminson Township), and Route 413 (only in Burlington). U.S. Routes that traverse are U.S. Route 9 (only in Bass River Township), U.S. Route 130 and U.S. Route 206. Limited access roads include the Garden State Parkway (a 7.4 miles (11.9 km) stretch in Bass River Township), Interstate 295 and the New Jersey Turnpike (a portion of Interstate 95).

The turnpike extends through the county for approximately 30.1 miles (48.4 km) from Cherry Hill in Camden County to Hamilton Township in Mercer County (including the 6.5 miles (10.5 km) Turnpike Extension from the turnpike bridge over the Delaware River to the mainline at Exit 6).

The county has five Turnpike interchanges: Exit 4 in Mount Laurel, Exit 5 in Westampton, Exit 6A in Florence Township, Exit 6 in Mansfield Township, and Exit 7 in Bordentown Township.

The New Jersey Turnpike Authority has widened the Parkway to three lanes in each direction from exit 80 in South Toms River, Ocean County to exit 30 in Somers Point, Atlantic County, which included widening of bridges at several river crossings. The Authority extended the 'dual-dual' configuration (inner car lanes and outer car / truck / bus lanes) on the turnpike south to Exit 6 from its former end at Exit 8A in Monroe Township, Middlesex County. This was finished in early November 2014.

=== Bridges ===
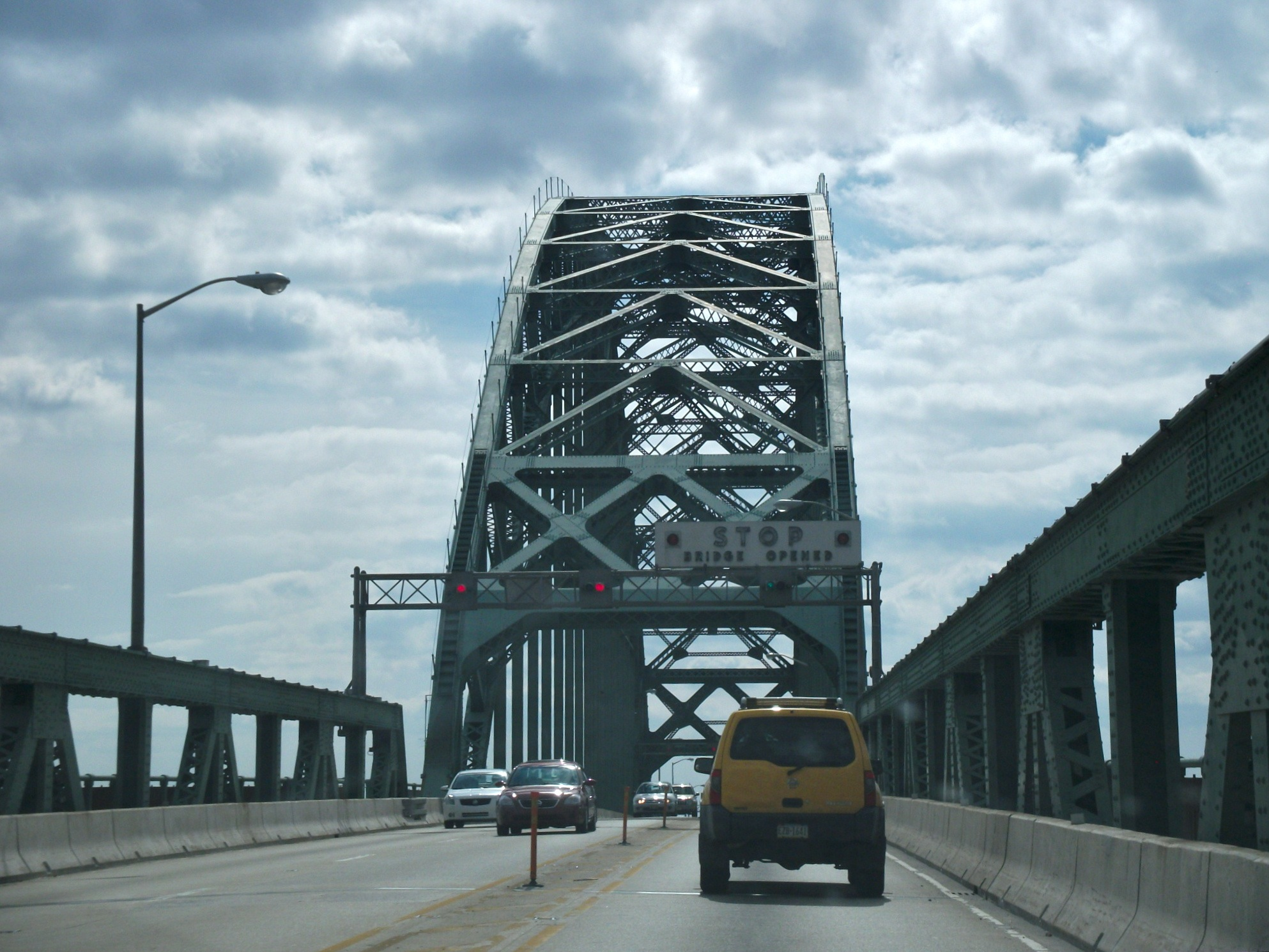
The Tacony-Palmyra Bridge, a drawbridge that crosses the upper Delaware River from Palmyra, New Jersey to the Tacony section of Philadelphia

The Burlington County Bridge Commission maintains the Tacony–Palmyra Bridge and the Burlington–Bristol Bridge, both of which cross the Delaware River. The agency also maintains several bridges along CR 543, including the Riverside–Delanco Bridge over the Rancocas Creek.

The Tacony–Palmyra Bridge is a combination steel tied arch and double-leaf bascule bridge across the Delaware River that connects New Jersey Route 73 in Palmyra with Pennsylvania Route 73 in the Tacony section of Philadelphia. Designed by architect Ralph Modjeski, the bridge is 3,659 feet (1,115 m) long and spans 2,324 feet (708 m). After 18 months of construction, the bridge opened in 1929, replacing ferry service that had operated between the two places since 1922.

The Burlington–Bristol Bridge is a truss bridge with a lift span crossing the Delaware River from Burlington to Bristol Township, Pennsylvania. Construction of the bridge started on April 1, 1930, and the bridge opened to traffic on May 2, 1931. The two-lane bridge is 2,301 feet (701 m) long; The lift span is 540 feet (164.6 m) long.

The 13.5 million toll-paying trips on the Burlington–Bristol and Tacony–Palmyra bridges and the per-car toll of $4 (reduced to $3 with E-ZPass) for cars heading into Pennsylvania generated $51 million in revenue in 2016.

The Riverside–Delanco Bridge is a truss bridge with a central swing span that carries County Route 543 across the Rancocas Creek, between Riverside Township and Delanco Township. The current bridge was built in 1934–1935 to replace the 1901 bridge, which itself replaced an 1870 structure.

=== Public transportation ===
The River Line is a diesel light-rail system operated for NJ Transit by the Southern New Jersey Rail Group on a former Pennsylvania Railroad line between the Trenton Transit Center in Trenton and the Walter Rand Transportation Center and other stations in Camden, with 11 stations in the county.

NJ Transit operates bus service into Philadelphia on the following routes; 317, 406, 409 414, and 417 routes, and into Camden only on the following routes; 407, 413, 418, 419 and 457; and to Atlantic City on the 559 route.

Academy Bus Lines operates buses from Mount Holly, Mount Laurel, Westampton and Willingboro Township to New York City's Port Authority Bus Terminal in Midtown Manhattan as well as the Wall Street area of Lower Manhattan.

The BurLink bus service provides three routes, under service funded by the county and operated by Stout's Transportation, providing connections to NJ Transit's bus and rail service.

== Wineries ==
- DeMastro Vineyards (Southampton Township)
- Iron Plow Vineyards (in the Columbus section of Mansfield Township)
- Valenzano Winery (Shamong Township)

== See also ==
- National Register of Historic Places listings in Burlington County, New Jersey
- Seal of Burlington County, New Jersey
