= Mount Holly Township Public Schools =

School district in Burlington County, New Jersey, US

Address
- 330 Levis Drive Mount Holly, Burlington County, New Jersey, 08060; United States
- Coordinates: 40.001341°N 74.796974°W

District information
- Grades: Pre-K to 8
- Superintendent: Robert Mungo
- Business administrator: Donna DiLapo
- Schools: 3

Students and staff
- Enrollment: 1,163 (as of 2024–25)
- Faculty: 106.0 FTEs
- Student–teacher ratio: 11.0:1

Other information
- District Factor Group: B
- Website: www.mtholly.k12.nj.us
Ind.	Per pupil	District spending	Rank (*)	K-8 average	%± vs. average
1A	Total Spending	$18,689	66	$18,891	−1.1%
1	Budgetary Cost	14,607	51	14,159	3.2%
2	Classroom Instruction	8,662	47	8,659	0.0%
6	Support Services	1,853	24	2,167	−14.5%
8	Administrative Cost	1,666	53	1,547	7.7%
10	Operations & Maintenance	2,192	81	1,612	36.0%
13	Extracurricular Activities	234	81	104	125.0%
16	Median Teacher Salary	71,148	78	61,136
Data from NJDoE 2014 Taxpayers' Guide to Education Spending. *Of K-8 districts with more than 750 students. Lowest spending=1; Highest=84

The Mount Holly Township Public Schools are a comprehensive community public school district, that serves students in pre-kindergarten through eighth grade from Mount Holly, in Burlington County, in the U.S. state of New Jersey.

As of the 2024–25 school year, the district, comprised of three schools, had an enrollment of 1,163 students and 106.0 classroom teachers (on an FTE basis), for a student–teacher ratio of 11.0:1.

For ninth through twelfth grades, public school students attend the Rancocas Valley Regional High School, a comprehensive regional public high school serving students from five communities encompassing approximately 40 square miles (100 km^{2}) and also includes the townships of Eastampton, Hainesport, Lumberton and Westampton. As of the 2024–25 school year, the high school had an enrollment of 1,928 students and 136.0 classroom teachers (on an FTE basis), for a student–teacher ratio of 14.2:1. The high school is located in Mount Holly.

== History ==
In 1948, during de jure educational segregation in the United States, the district had a school for black children that lacked the cafeteria and disabled/handicapped features that the school for white children had.

The district had been classified by the New Jersey Department of Education as being in District Factor Group "B", the second lowest of eight groupings. District Factor Groups organize districts statewide to allow comparison by common socioeconomic characteristics of the local districts. From lowest socioeconomic status to highest, the categories are A, B, CD, DE, FG, GH, I and J.

== Schools ==
Schools in the district (with 2024–25 enrollment data from the National Center for Education Statistics) are:

Elementary schools

- John Brainerd School with 304 students in grades PreK-1
  - Nicole Peoples, principal
- Gertrude C. Folwell School with 327 students in grades 2-4
  - Daniel Finn, principal

Middle school

- F. W. Holbein Middle School with 451 students in grades 5-8
  - Sonya Nock, principal

== Administration ==
Core members of the district's administration are:

- Robert Mungo, superintendent
- Donna DiLapo, business administrator and board secretary

== Board of education ==
The district's board of education is comprised of five members who set policy and oversee the fiscal and educational operation of the district through its administration. As a Type II school district, the board's trustees are elected directly by voters to serve three-year terms of office on a staggered basis, with either one or two seats up for election each year held (since 2012) as part of the November general election. The board appoints a superintendent to oversee the district's day-to-day operations and a business administrator to supervise the business functions of the district.

On January 25, 2012, the Board voted, 3-1, to move school elections from April to November following the adoption of legislation allowing New Jersey school districts, municipal governing bodies, or citizen petition committees to do so.
