= Chesterfield School District (New Jersey) =

School district in Burlington County, New Jersey, US

Address
- 30 Saddle Way Chesterfield Township, Burlington County, New Jersey, 08515; United States
- Coordinates: 40.13643°N 74.649679°W

District information
- Grades: PreK-6
- Superintendent: Scott Heino
- Business administrator: Scott Hogan
- Schools: 1

Students and staff
- Enrollment: 695 (as of 2023–24)
- Faculty: 64.0 FTEs
- Student–teacher ratio: 10.9:1

Other information
- District Factor Group: GH
- Website: www.chesterfieldschool.com
| Ind. | Per pupil | District spending | Rank (*) | K-6 average | %± vs. average |
|---|---|---|---|---|---|
| 1A | Total Spending | $16,495 | 21 | $18,891 | −12.7% |
| 1 | Budgetary Cost | 10,554 | 2 | 13,649 | −22.7% |
| 2 | Classroom Instruction | 5,924 | 1 | 8,366 | −29.2% |
| 6 | Support Services | 1,816 | 15 | 2,161 | −16.0% |
| 8 | Administrative Cost | 1,304 | 12 | 1,467 | −11.1% |
| 10 | Operations & Maintenance | 1,460 | 22 | 1,552 | −5.9% |
| 13 | Extracurricular Activities | 11 | 8 | 39 | −71.8% |
| 16 | Median Teacher Salary | 53,344 | 14 | 57,437 |
Data from NJDoE 2014 Taxpayers' Guide to Education Spending. *Of K-6 districts with any number of students. Lowest spending=1; Highest=59

The Chesterfield School District is a community public school district that serves students in pre-kindergarten through sixth grades from Chesterfield Township in Burlington County, in the U.S. state of New Jersey.

As of the 2023–24 school year, the district, comprised of one school, had an enrollment of 695 students and 64.0 classroom teachers (on an FTE basis), for a student–teacher ratio of 10.9:1.

The district had been classified by the New Jersey Department of Education as being in District Factor Group "GH", the third-highest of eight groupings. District Factor Groups organize districts statewide to allow comparison by common socioeconomic characteristics of the local districts. From lowest socioeconomic status to highest, the categories are A, B, CD, DE, FG, GH, I and J.

Public school students in seventh through twelfth grades attend the schools of the Northern Burlington County Regional School District, which also serves students from Mansfield Township, North Hanover Township and Springfield Township, along with children of United States Air Force personnel based at McGuire Air Force Base. The schools in the district (with 2023–24 enrollment data from the National Center for Education Statistics) are Northern Burlington County Regional Middle School with 718 students in grades 7 - 8 and Northern Burlington County Regional High School with 1,381 students in grades 9-12. Both schools are in the Columbus section of Mansfield Township. Using a formula that reflects the population and the value of the assessed property in each of the constituent municipalities, taxpayers in Chesterfield Township pay 21.6% of the district's tax levy, with the district's 2013-14 budget including $35.6 million in spending.

== History ==
In December 2007, voters approved a referendum under which the district would spend $37.7 million (equivalent to $58.5 million in 2025) to construct a new school building. The new school opened in January 2011, after having been pushed back from an original target opening date of September 2010. Costs related to the construction of the new school building and growing enrollment led to an increase in 8.6% in the local tax levy in the 2011-12 budget, which had grown to $9.4 million.

== Schools ==
- Chesterfield Elementary School had an enrollment of 692 students in grades PreK-6 in the 2023–24 school year.
  - Coletta Graham, principal

== Administration ==
Core members of the district's administration are:

- Scott Heino, superintendent
- Scott Hogan, business administrator and board secretary

== Board of education ==
The district's board of education is comprised of five members who set policy and oversee the fiscal and educational operation of the district through its administration. As a Type II school district, the board's trustees are elected directly by voters to serve three-year terms of office on a staggered basis, with either one or two seats up for election each year held (since 2012) as part of the November general election. The board appoints a superintendent to oversee the district's day-to-day operations and a business administrator to supervise the business functions of the district.
