= Palmyra Public Schools =

School district in Burlington County, New Jersey, US

Address
- 301 Delaware Avenue Palmyra, Burlington County, New Jersey, 08065; United States
- Coordinates: 40.003684°N 75.027719°W

District information
- Grades: Pre-K to 12
- Superintendent: Florencia Norton
- Business administrator: Jared M. Toscano
- Schools: 4

Students and staff
- Enrollment: 1,083 (as of 2023–24)
- Faculty: 90.8 FTEs
- Student–teacher ratio: 11.9:1

Other information
- District Factor Group: DE
- Website: www.palmyraschools.com
Ind.	Per pupil	District spending	Rank (*)	K-12 average	%± vs. average
1A	Total Spending	$17,416	21	$18,891	−7.8%
1	Budgetary Cost	13,216	15	14,783	−10.6%
2	Classroom Instruction	7,599	16	8,763	−13.3%
6	Support Services	1,925	21	2,392	−19.5%
8	Administrative Cost	1,392	5	1,485	−6.3%
10	Operations & Maintenance	1,598	25	1,783	−10.4%
13	Extracurricular Activities	674	47	268	151.5%
16	Median Teacher Salary	58,165	20	64,043
Data from NJDoE 2014 Taxpayers' Guide to Education Spending. *Of K-12 districts with up to 1,800 students. Lowest spending=1; Highest=49

The Palmyra Public Schools is a comprehensive community public school district that serves students in pre-kindergarten to twelfth grade from Palmyra, in Burlington County, in the U.S. state of New Jersey. Students from Beverly and Riverton attend the district's high school as part of sending/receiving relationships with both districts.

As of the 2023–24 school year, the district, comprised of four schools, had an enrollment of 1,083 students and 90.8 classroom teachers (on an FTE basis), for a student–teacher ratio of 11.9:1.

== History ==
In 1948, during de jure educational segregation in the United States, the district had children of all races attend the same school, but then grouped all of the black children in the same class with a black teacher.

The district had been classified by the New Jersey Department of Education as being in District Factor Group "DE", the fifth-highest of eight groupings. District Factor Groups organize districts statewide to allow comparison by common socioeconomic characteristics of the local districts. From lowest socioeconomic status to highest, the categories are A, B, CD, DE, FG, GH, I and J.

In March 2024, Palmyra residents voted in favor of an $18.4 million bond referendum to fund school district facility upgrades and improvements, including more than $10 million for work at the middle / high school. Later that month, the district learned of a $1.07 million reduction in state aid from the New Jersey Department of Education for the 2024–25 school year. Following an appeal by the district, it was confirmed by the New Jersey Department of the Treasury that the district income used to calculate the previously quoted state aid was incorrect:

"'Our district income went from $217,109,243 in 2019 to $208,454,233 in 2020 (a 3.99% decrease),' Pease explained. 'It then went from $208,454,233 in 2020 to $317,940,995 in 2021 (a 52.52% increase).'"

== Schools ==
Schools in the district (with 2023–24 enrollment from the National Center for Education Statistics) are:

Preschool

- Palmyra Preschool with 56 students in PreK
  - Robyn Ivanisik, principal

Elementary school

- Charles Street Elementary School with 394 students in grades PreK–5
  - Octavia Lee, principal

Middle / High school

- Palmyra High and Middle School with 182 students in grades 6–8 and 407 in 9–12
  - Daniel Licata, principal

== Administration ==
Core members of the district's administration are:

- Florencia Norton, superintendent
- Jared M. Toscano, business administrator and board secretary

== Board of education ==
The district's board of education, comprised of eleven members, sets policy and oversees the fiscal and educational operation of the district through its administration. As a Type II school district, the board's trustees are elected directly by voters to serve three-year terms of office on a staggered basis, with three seats up for election each year held (since 2012) as part of the November general election. The board appoints a superintendent to oversee the district's day-to-day operations and a business administrator to supervise the business functions of the district. The board includes one representative from Beverly and one from Riverton.
