= Rancocas =

Rancocas may refer to the following in the U.S. state of New Jersey:

- Rancocas, New Jersey, a village in Westampton Township, Burlington County
- Rancocas Creek, a tributary of the Delaware River
- Rancocas Farm, in Jobstown
- Rancocas Valley Regional High School, in Burlington County
- Rancocas Woods, New Jersey, a locality in Mount Laurel Township, Burlington County
- USS Rancocas, nickname of the Vice Admiral James H. Doyle Combat Systems Engineering Development Site
