= Burrs Mill =

Burrs Mill may refer to:

- Burrs Mill Brook
- Burrs Mill, New Jersey

== See also ==
- Burr mill
