= Beaverville, New Jersey =

Populated place in Burlington County, New Jersey, US

- Unincorporated community
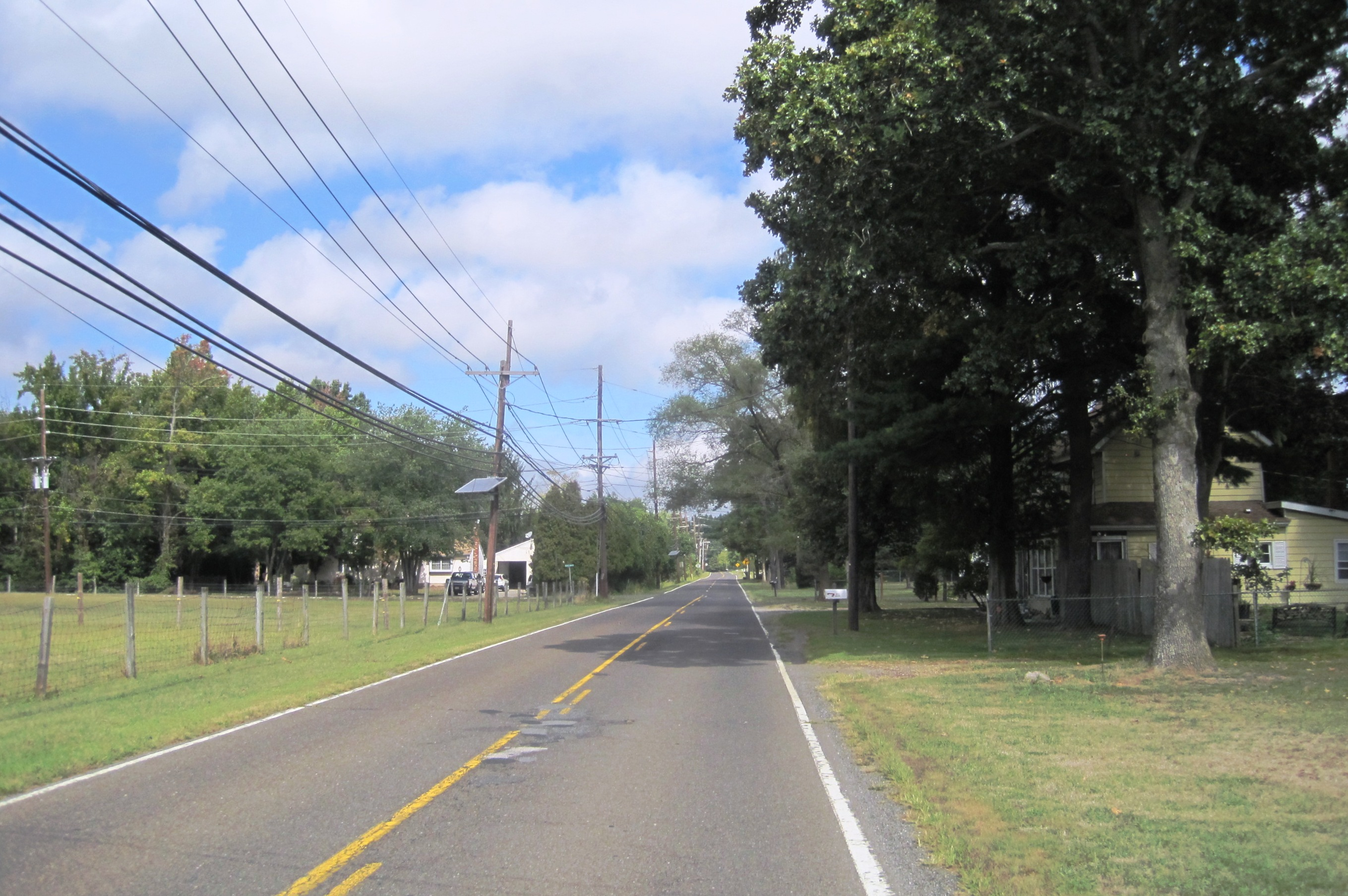
- Along Red Lion Road

- Location of Beaverville in Burlington County (Inset: Location of county within the state of New Jersey) Beaverville (New Jersey) Beaverville (the United States)
- Coordinates: 39°54′06″N 74°44′31″W
- Country: United States
- State: New Jersey
- County: Burlington
- Township: Southampton
- Elevation: 46 ft (14 m)
- Time zone: UTC−05:00 (Eastern (EST))
  - Summer (DST): UTC−04:00 (EDT)
- GNIS feature ID: 874628

Beaverville is an unincorporated community located within Southampton Township in Burlington County, in the U.S. state of New Jersey. The area is composed of single-family homes, small businesses and warehouses, forest, and farmland. The community is located along Red Lion Road (County Route 641) two miles (3.2 km) south of Vincentown, to the west of U.S. Route 206, and southeast of the Red Lion Airport. Originally, the settlement was the site of a one-room schoolhouse.

== Geography ==
Beaverville is located at an elevation of 14 meters (46 feet) above sea level, and its time zone is UTC-5, or Eastern Time (EST). Daylight saving time is observed there, which is UTC-4 (EDT), one hour ahead of UTC-5.
