= Retreat, New Jersey =

Populated place in Burlington County, New Jersey, US

- Unincorporated community
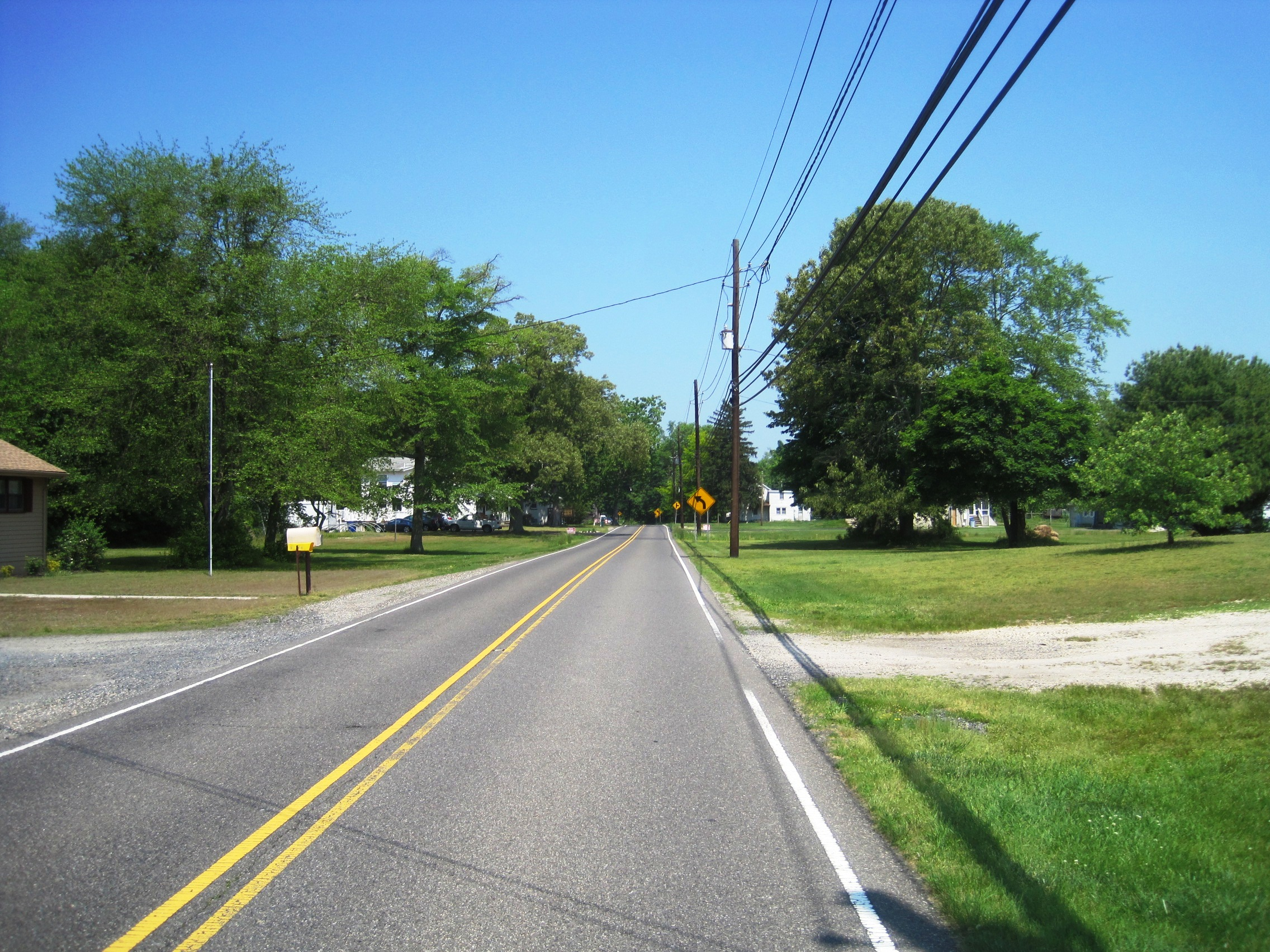
- Along Big Hill Road

- Location in Burlington County (Inset: Burlington County in New Jersey) Retreat (New Jersey) Retreat (the United States)
- Coordinates: 39°54′59″N 74°42′46″W
- Country: United States
- State: New Jersey
- County: Burlington
- Township: Southampton
- Elevation: 30 ft (9 m)
- Time zone: UTC−05:00 (Eastern (EST))
  - Summer (DST): UTC−04:00 (Eastern (EDT))
- Area code: 609
- GNIS feature ID: 879666

Retreat is an unincorporated community and former hamlet located within Southampton Township in Burlington County, in the U.S. state of New Jersey. The area consists of some residential houses grouped together along Big Hill Road and Retreat Road. A large cranberry bog exists to the southeast of the community while Leisuretowne retirement community is located southwest of here. Most of the remaining area consists of forestland.

The community was originally named New Retreat during the American Revolutionary War by a Continental Army soldier who used the site for a cannonball manufacturing. The site was concealed from the British army who at the time was occupying present-day Mount Holly. Retreat was later home to cotton mills which operated until the 1840s.
