= Buddtown, New Jersey =

Populated place in Burlington County, New Jersey, US

- Unincorporated community
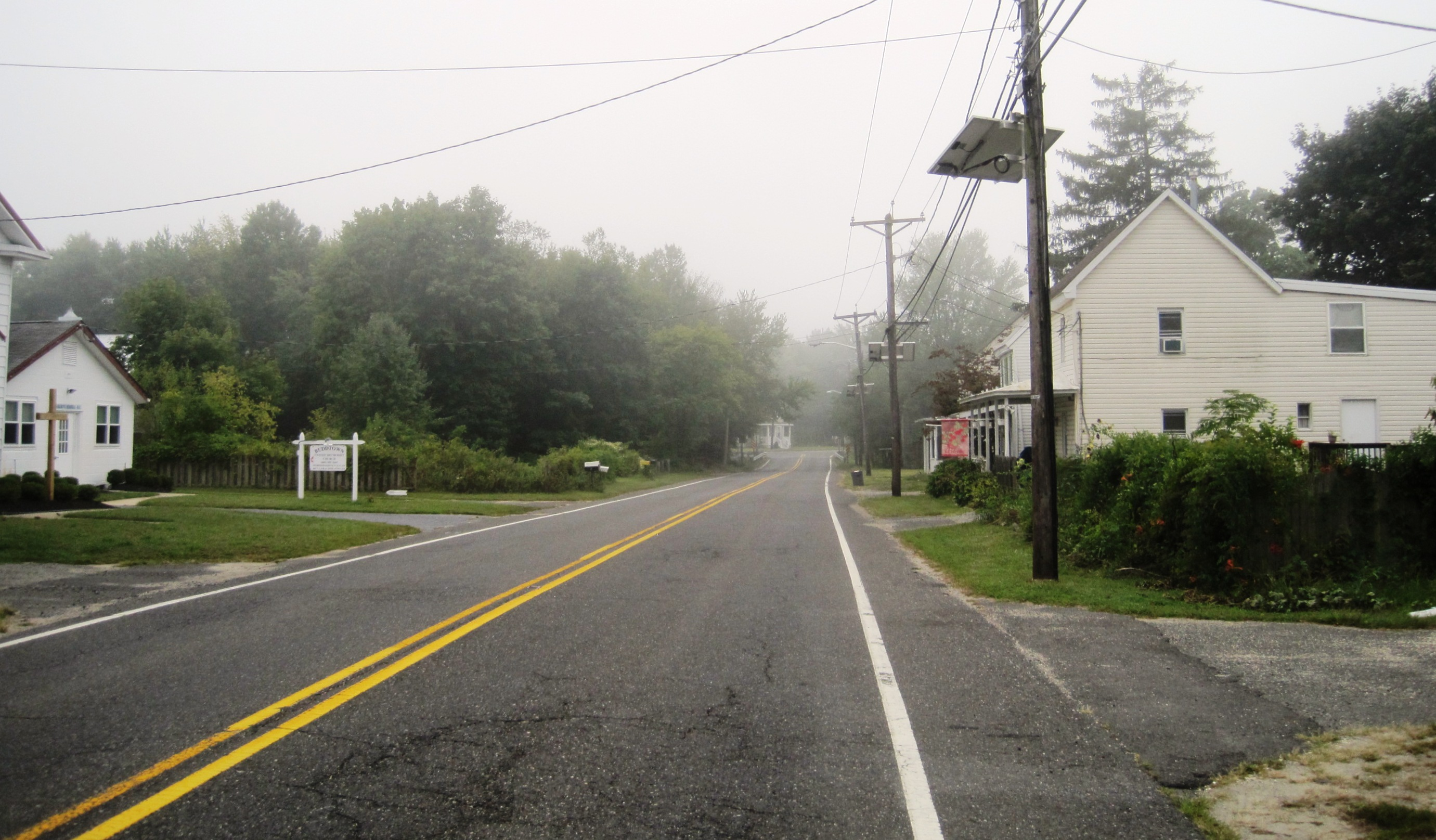
- Ridge Road in Buddtown

- Location of Buddtown in Burlington County (Inset: Location of county within the state of New Jersey) Buddtown (New Jersey) Buddtown (the United States)
- Coordinates: 39°56′21″N 74°42′11″W
- Country: United States
- State: New Jersey
- County: Burlington
- Township: Southampton
- Elevation: 46 ft (14 m)
- Time zone: UTC−05:00 (Eastern (EST))
  - Summer (DST): UTC−04:00 (EDT)
- Area code: 609
- GNIS feature ID: 875017

Buddtown is an unincorporated community located within Southampton Township in Burlington County, in the U.S. state of New Jersey. Located between Vincentown and Pemberton, it is named for Thomas Budd who owned farmland in the area in the 18th century. The area itself contains houses and churches in the community itself and farmland surrounding the settlement. The stream that runs through Buddtown is named Stop the Jade Run supposedly named for the cry made by the owners of a runaway horse, "jade" being an old name for a horse.
