= N73 =

N73 may refer to:

- N73 (Long Island bus)
- BMW N73, an automobile engine
- Escadrille N73, a unit of the French Air Force
- London Buses route N73
- N73 road (Ireland)
- Nokia N73, a mobile phone
- Red Lion Airport, in Burlington County, New Jersey, United States
- Rembarrnga language, of the Northern Territory, Australia
