= Friendship Creek =

River in the United States of America

Coordinates: 39°52′25″N 74°41′43″W

Friendship Creek is a 9.4-mile-long (15.1 km) tributary of the South Branch Rancocas Creek in southern New Jersey in the United States.

== Tributaries ==
- Burrs Mill Brook

== See also ==
- List of rivers of New Jersey
