= Leisuretowne, New Jersey =

Populated place in Burlington County, New Jersey, US

- Census-designated place
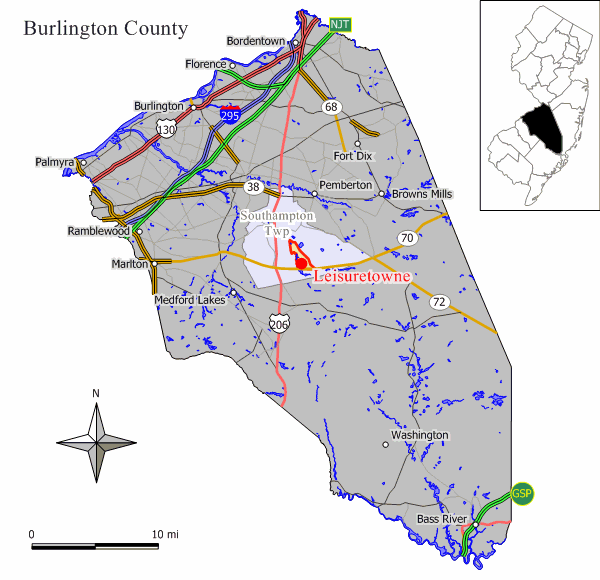
- Map of Leisuretowne CDP in Burlington County. Inset: Location of Burlington County in New Jersey.

- Location in Burlington County Location in New Jersey Location in the United States
- Coordinates: 39.89342°N 74.708177°W
- Country: United States
- State: New Jersey
- County: Burlington
- Township: Southampton

Area
  - Total: 2.19 sq mi (5.66 km^{2})
  - Land: 2.07 sq mi (5.35 km^{2})
  - Water: 0.12 sq mi (0.31 km^{2}) 6.25%
- Elevation: 46 ft (14 m)

Population (2020)
  - Total: 3,842
  - Density: 1,859.8/sq mi (718.06/km^{2})
- Time zone: UTC−05:00 (Eastern (EST))
  - Summer (DST): UTC−04:00 (Eastern (EDT))
- Area code: 609
- FIPS code: 34-39885
- GNIS feature ID: 02390054

Leisuretowne is an unincorporated community and census-designated place (CDP) located within Southampton Township, in Burlington County, in the U.S. state of New Jersey. As of the 2020 census, Leisuretowne had a population of 3,842.

Leisuretowne is a retirement village, with a standing rule of having prospective residents reach the age of 55 before purchasing a home. Two thirds of the CDPs residents are 65 years of age or older.

== Geography ==
According to the United States Census Bureau, Leisuretowne had a total area of 2.043 square miles (5.29 km^{2}), including 1.915 square miles (4.96 km^{2}) of land and 0.128 square miles (0.33 km^{2}) of water (6.25%).

== Demographics ==
Historical population
Census	Pop.	Note	%±
1980	2,375		—
1990	2,552		7.5%
2000	2,535		−0.7%
2010	3,582		41.3%
2020	3,842		7.3%
Population sources: 1950 1960 1970; 1980 1990 2000; 2010 2020

Leisuretownefirst appeared as a census designated place in the 1980 U.S. census.

=== Racial and ethnic composition ===
Leisuretowne CDP, New Jersey – Racial and ethnic composition Note: the US Census treats Hispanic/Latino as an ethnic category. This table excludes Latinos from the racial categories and assigns them to a separate category. Hispanics/Latinos may be of any race.
Race / Ethnicity (NH = Non-Hispanic)	Pop 2000	Pop 2010	Pop 2020	% 2000	% 2010	% 2020
White alone (NH)	2,477	3,415	3,518	97.71%	95.34%	91.57%
Black or African American alone (NH)	27	93	115	1.07%	2.60%	2.99%
Native American or Alaska Native alone (NH)	2	3	1	0.08%	0.08%	0.03%
Asian alone (NH)	3	25	42	0.12%	0.70%	1.09%
Native Hawaiian or Pacific Islander alone (NH)	0	0	2	0.00%	0.00%	0.05%
Other race alone (NH)	0	0	7	0.00%	0.00%	0.18%
Mixed race or Multiracial (NH)	7	11	69	0.28%	0.31%	1.80%
Hispanic or Latino (any race)	19	35	88	0.75%	0.98%	2.29%
Total	2,535	3,582	3,842	100.00%	100.00%	100.00%

=== 2020 census ===
As of the 2020 census, Leisuretowne had a population of 3,842. The median age was 70.4 years. 3.5% of residents were under the age of 18 and 65.6% of residents were 65 years of age or older. For every 100 females there were 77.8 males, and for every 100 females age 18 and over there were 76.1 males age 18 and over.

98.1% of residents lived in urban areas, while 1.9% lived in rural areas.

There were 2,291 households in Leisuretowne, of which 4.1% had children under the age of 18 living in them. Of all households, 40.5% were married-couple households, 14.8% were households with a male householder and no spouse or partner present, and 41.3% were households with a female householder and no spouse or partner present. About 45.8% of all households were made up of individuals and 37.2% had someone living alone who was 65 years of age or older.

There were 2,457 housing units, of which 6.8% were vacant. The homeowner vacancy rate was 2.8% and the rental vacancy rate was 1.9%.

=== 2010 census ===
The 2010 United States census counted 3,582 people, 2,204 households, and 1,078 families in the CDP. The population density was 1,870.3 people per square mile (722.1 people/km^{2}). There were 2,351 housing units at an average density of 1,227.5 units per square mile (473.9 units/km^{2}). The racial makeup was 96.12% (3,443) White, 2.60% (93) Black or African American, 0.08% (3) Native American, 0.70% (25) Asian, 0.00% (0) Pacific Islander, 0.08% (3) from other races, and 0.42% (15) from two or more races. Hispanic or Latino of any race were 0.98% (35) of the population.

Of the 2,204 households, 2.3% had children under the age of 18; 41.6% were married couples living together; 5.3% had a female householder with no husband present and 51.1% were non-families. Of all households, 48.5% were made up of individuals and 40.5% had someone living alone who was 65 years of age or older. The average household size was 1.63 and the average family size was 2.21.

2.9% of the population were under the age of 18, 1.9% from 18 to 24, 4.7% from 25 to 44, 23.9% from 45 to 64, and 66.6% who were 65 years of age or older. The median age was 71.1 years. For every 100 females, the population had 71.1 males. For every 100 females ages 18 and older there were 70.0 males.

=== 2000 census ===
As of the 2000 United States census there were 2,535 people, 1,628 households, and 817 families living in the CDP. The population density was 546.8 people/km^{2} (1,416 people/mi^{2}). There were 1,709 housing units at an average density of 368.6 units/km^{2} (955 units/mi^{2}). The racial makeup of the CDP was 98.46% White, 1.07% African American, 0.08% Native American, 0.12% Asian, and 0.28% from two or more races. Hispanic or Latino of any race were 0.75% of the population.

There were 1,628 households, out of which 0.2% had children under the age of 18 living with them, 45.8% were married couples living together, 3.5% had a female householder with no husband present, and 49.8% were non-families. 47.6% of all households were made up of individuals, and 42.4% had someone living alone who was 65 years of age or older. The average household size was 1.56 and the average family size was 2.07.

In the CDP the population was spread out, with 0.2% under the age of 18, 0.4% from 18 to 24, 1.9% from 25 to 44, 17.9% from 45 to 64, and 79.6% who were 65 years of age or older. The median age was 74 years. For every 100 females, there were 67.0 males. For every 100 females age 18 and over, there were 67.0 males.

The median income for a household in the CDP was $30,020, and the median income for a family was $36,526. Males had a median income of $42,143 versus $32,969 for females. The per capita income for the CDP was $27,581. None of the families and 2.5% of the population were living below the poverty line, including no under eighteens and 2.2% of those over 64.

== Education ==
Its school districts are Southampton Township School District (elementary and middle school) and Lenape Regional School District (high school).
