= William Norton Shinn =

American politician

At-large Member of the U.S. House of Representatives from New Jersey
- In office March 4, 1833 – March 3, 1837

Chair of the New Jersey Democratic State Committee
- In office 1832

Member of the New Jersey Legislative Council
- In office 1829–1832
- In office 1818

Member of the New Jersey General Assembly
- In office 1828

Sheriff of Burlington County, New Jersey
- In office 1825–1828

Personal details
- Born: October 24, 1782 Burlington County, New Jersey, US
- Died: August 18, 1871 (aged 88) Mount Holly Township, New Jersey, US
- Resting place: Mount Holly Cemetery, Mount Holly, New Jersey, US
- Party: Democratic
- Other political affiliations: Jacksonian

William Norton Shinn (October 24, 1782, Burlington County, New Jersey – August 18, 1871, Mount Holly Township, New Jersey) was a United States representative from New Jersey.

== Biography ==
Shinn was a farmer and Sheriff of Burlington County, New Jersey from 1825 to 1828. He was elected to the New Jersey General Assembly in 1828, served in the New Jersey Legislative Council in 1818 and 1829 to 1832, and was chairman of the New Jersey Democratic State Committee in 1832.

Shinn was elected as a Jacksonian to the Twenty-third and Twenty-fourth Congresses, serving in office from March 4, 1833 – March 3, 1837.

After retiring from Congress, he resumed farming, and served as president of the Burlington Agricultural Association in 1853 and 1854. He also was elected a director of The Camden & Amboy Railroad.

Shinn died in Mount Holly, New Jersey on August 18, 1871, and was buried in Mount Holly Cemetery.

U.S. House of Representatives
Preceded by Isaac Southard	Member of the U.S. House of Representatives from New Jersey's at-large congressional district 1833–1837	Succeeded by Thomas J. Yorke
