= Burrs Mill, New Jersey =

Populated place in Burlington County, New Jersey, US

- Unincorporated community
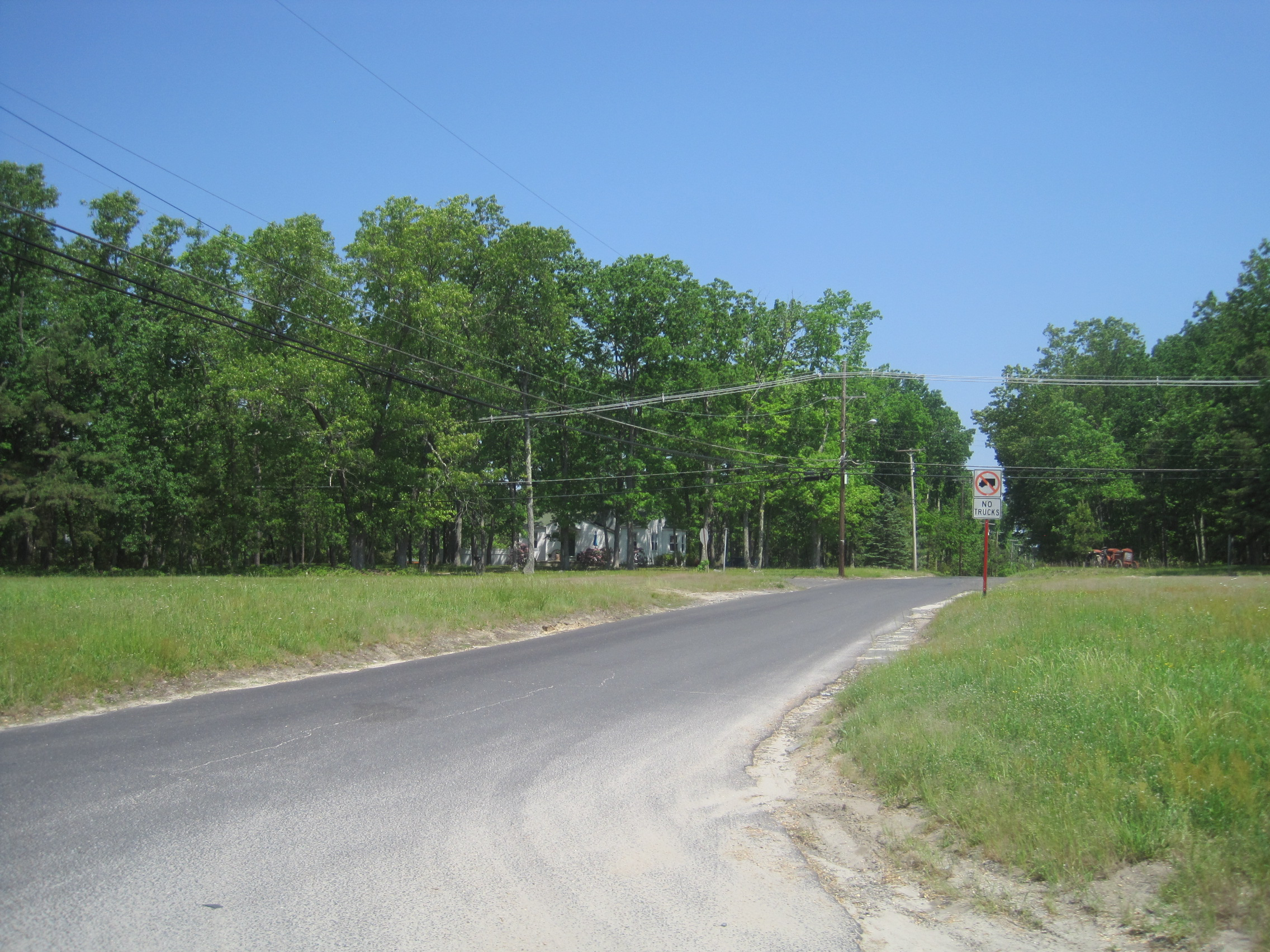
- Looking north along Burrs Mill Road from Route 70

- Location of Burrs Mill in Burlington County (Inset: Location of county within the state of New Jersey) Burrs; Mill (New Jersey) Burrs; Mill (the United States)
- Coordinates: 39°53′18″N 74°39′00″W
- Country: United States
- State: New Jersey
- County: Burlington
- Township: Southampton
- Elevation: 85 ft (26 m)
- Time zone: UTC−05:00 (Eastern (EST))
  - Summer (DST): UTC−04:00 (EDT)
- Area codes: 609, 640
- GNIS feature ID: 875051

Burrs Mill is an unincorporated community located within Southampton Township in Burlington County, in the U.S. state of New Jersey. Found in a rural portion of the township near Route 70, it is located along its eponymous brook in a forested area within the Pine Barrens. A low density of houses surround nearby roads including Burrs Mill Road and Route 70's fire roads.
