= Samuel A. Dobbins =

American politician

Samuel Atkinson Dobbins
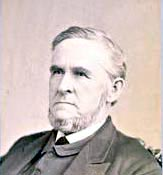
- Dobbins in 1865.

Member of the U.S. House of Representatives from New Jersey's 2nd district
- In office March 4, 1873 – March 3, 1877
- Preceded by: Samuel C. Forker
- Succeeded by: John H. Pugh

Personal details
- Born: April 14, 1814 Vincentown in Southampton Township, New Jersey, U.S.
- Died: May 26, 1886 (aged 72) Mount Holly Township, New Jersey, U.S.
- Party: Republican
- Profession: Politician

Samuel Atkinson Dobbins (April 14, 1814 – May 26, 1886) was a Republican Party politician who represented New Jersey's 2nd congressional district in the United States House of Representatives from 1873 to 1877. He served as the Sheriff of Burlington County, New Jersey from 1854 to 1857.

== Biography ==
Dobbins was born near Vincentown in Southampton Township, New Jersey (in Burlington County) on April 14, 1814. He attended private and public schools, and engaged in agricultural pursuits. He moved to Mount Holly Township, New Jersey in 1838 and continued farming. He was high sheriff of Burlington County from 1854 to 1857, and served as a member of the New Jersey General Assembly from 1859 to 1861. He was a delegate to the 1864 Republican National Convention. Dobbins was a trustee of the Pennington Seminary from 1866 to 1886, serving as president of the board of trustees for ten years.

Dobbins was elected as a Republican to the Forty-third and Forty-fourth Congresses, serving in office from March 4, 1873 – March 3, 1877, but was not a candidate for renomination in 1876.

After leaving Congress, he resumed agricultural pursuits. He died in Mount Holly on May 26, 1886, and was interred in Mount Holly Cemetery.

U.S. House of Representatives
Preceded by Samuel C. Forker	Member of the U.S. House of Representatives from New Jersey's 2nd congressional district March 4, 1873–March 3, 1877	Succeeded by John H. Pugh
