= Samuel C. Forker =

American politician

Samuel Carr Forker
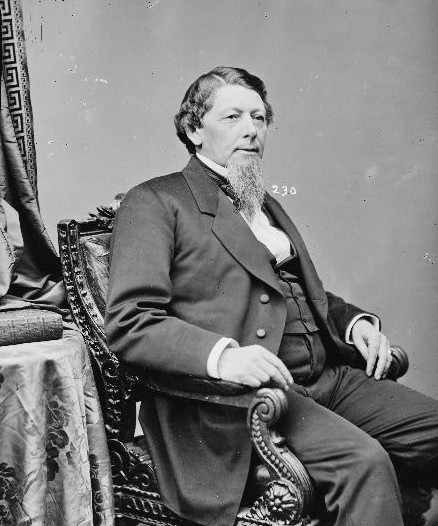

Member of the U.S. House of Representatives from New Jersey's 2nd district
- In office March 4, 1871 – March 3, 1873
- Preceded by: Charles Haight
- Succeeded by: Samuel A. Dobbins

Personal details
- Born: March 16, 1821 near Mount Holly Township, New Jersey, US
- Died: February 10, 1900 (aged 78) Edgewater Park Township, New Jersey, US
- Party: Democratic
- Profession: Banker, Politician

Samuel Carr Forker (March 16, 1821 – February 10, 1900) was a Democratic Party politician who represented New Jersey's 2nd congressional district in the United States House of Representatives for one term from 1871 to 1873.

== Early life and education ==
Forker was born in Mount Holly Township, New Jersey on March 16, 1821. He completed preparatory studies, moved to Bordentown, New Jersey and engaged in banking. He was director and cashier of the Bordentown Banking Company.

== Congress ==
Forker was elected as a Democrat to the Forty-second Congress, serving in office from March 4, 1871 – March 3, 1873, but was an unsuccessful candidate for reelection in 1872 to the Forty-third Congress.

== Retirement and death ==
After leaving Congress, he again engaged in banking. He moved to Delanco Township, New Jersey in 1890, and lived in retirement with his son until his death in Edgewater Park Township, New Jersey on February 10, 1900. He was interred in Mount Holly Cemetery.

U.S. House of Representatives
Preceded by Charles Haight	Member of the U.S. House of Representatives from New Jersey's 2nd congressional district March 4, 1871–March 3, 1873	Succeeded by Samuel A. Dobbins
