= Rancocas, New Jersey =

Populated place in Burlington County, New Jersey, US

- Unincorporated community
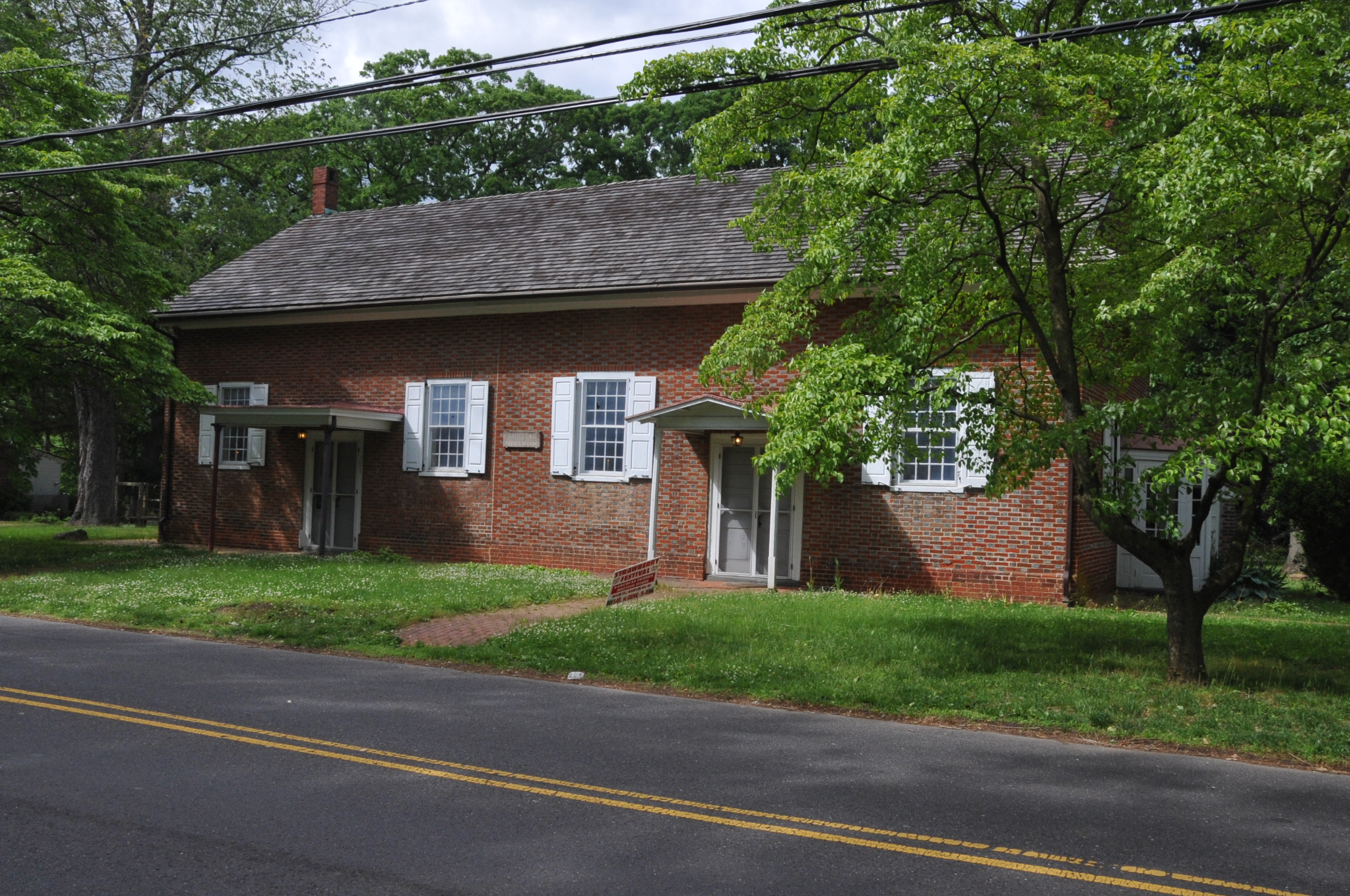
- Rancocas Friends Meeting House

- Location within Burlington County, New Jersey Location within New Jersey Location within the United States
- Coordinates: 40°00′38″N 74°52′01″W
- Country: United States
- State: New Jersey
- County: Burlington
- Township: Westampton
- Elevation: 59 ft (18 m)
- Time zone: UTC−05:00 (Eastern (EST))
  - Summer (DST): UTC−04:00 (EDT)
- Zip Code: 08073
- Area codes: 609, 640
- GNIS feature ID: 879606

Rancocas is an unincorporated community located within Westampton Township in Burlington County, New Jersey.

== Name ==
Rancocas was the name of a sub-tribe of Lenape people, who lived along Rancocas Creek. Their 17th-century village was also called Ramock and Rankokas.

== History ==
The village developed along the Mount Holly–Beverly Turnpike. In 1703, a Quaker meeting house, a log building, was erected in the community.

== Historic district ==
- Rancocas Historic Village
- U.S. National Register of Historic Places
- U.S. Historic district
- New Jersey Register of Historic Places
- Location: Irregular pattern bounded north and west by Willingboro border, east to Springside Road and south to 3rd Street
- Area: 25 acres (10 ha)
- NRHP reference No.: 75001126
- NJRHP No.: 880

Significant dates
- Added to NRHP: June 5, 1975
- Designated NJRHP: September 6, 1973

The Rancocas Historic Village, also known as the Rancocas Village Historic District, is a historic district in Rancocas Village, bounded north and west by the Willingboro Township border, east to Springside Road and south to 3rd Street. It was added to the National Register of Historic Places on June 5, 1975 for its significance in architecture, commerce, and education. The district includes 46 contributing buildings. The Quaker meeting house, a Friends meeting house, on Main Street was built in 1772 and features Flemish bond and patterned brick work. The nearby Friends school was built in 1822, also with brick.

== Legacy ==
Several scenes in the Howard Hawks film Ball of Fire are set in Rancocas.

== Gallery ==
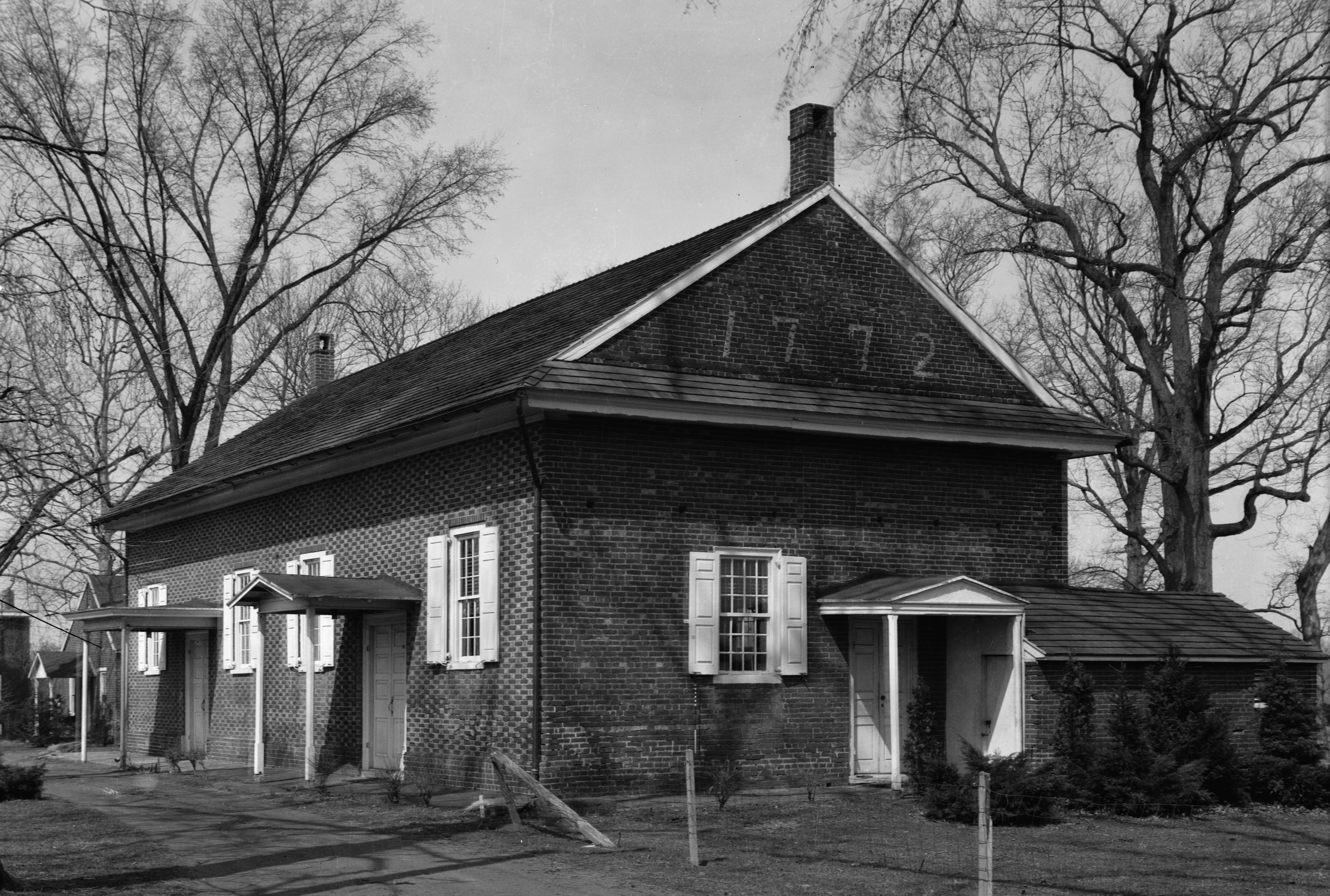
Friends meeting house, with 1772 in patterned brick work

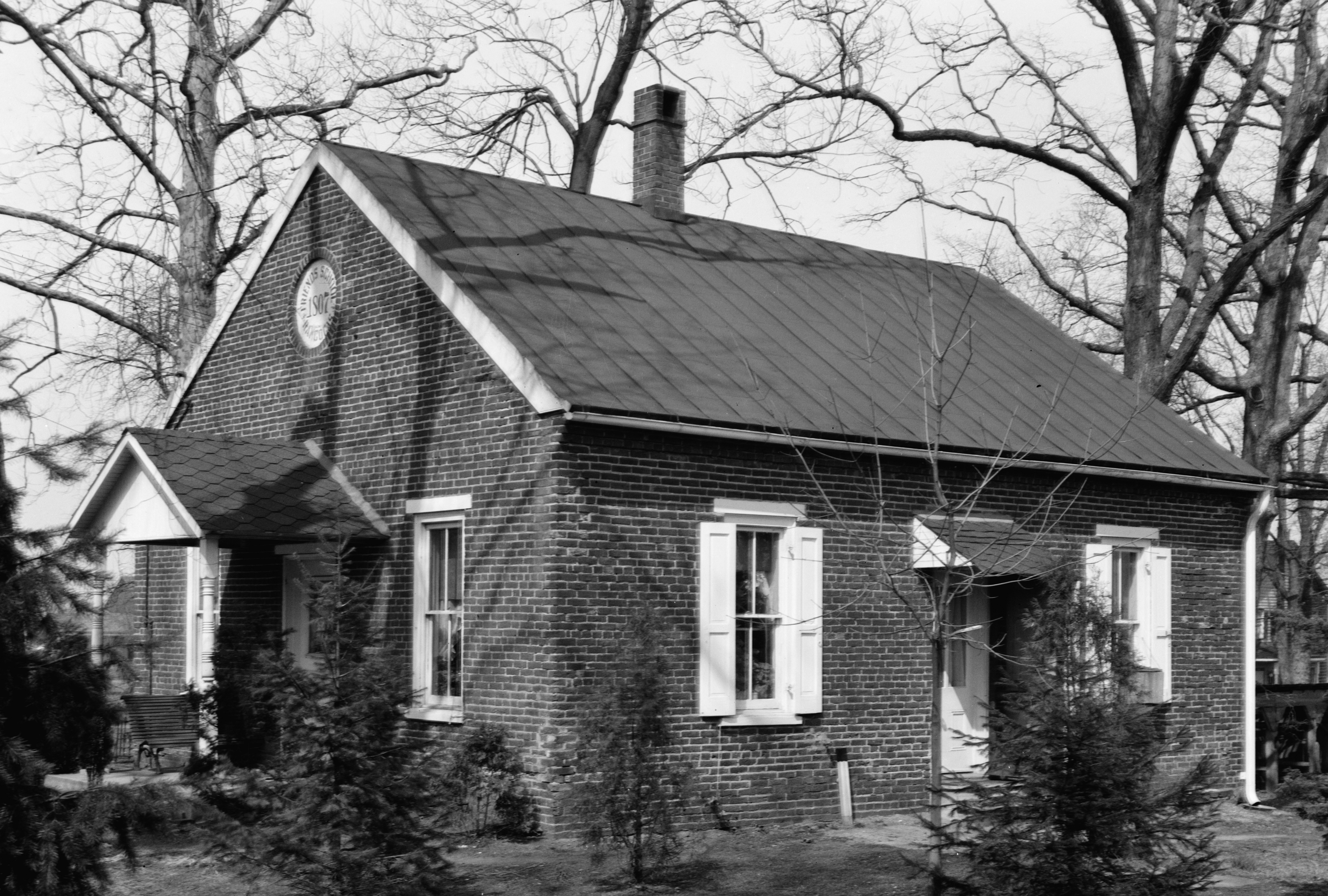
Friends school, built 1822

== See also ==
- Rancocas Creek
- Rancocas Woods, New Jersey
- Timbuctoo, New Jersey
- List of the oldest buildings in New Jersey
- List of Quaker meeting houses
