= Bishop–Irick Farmstead =

Historic house in New Jersey, United States

- U.S. National Register of Historic Places
- New Jersey Register of Historic Places
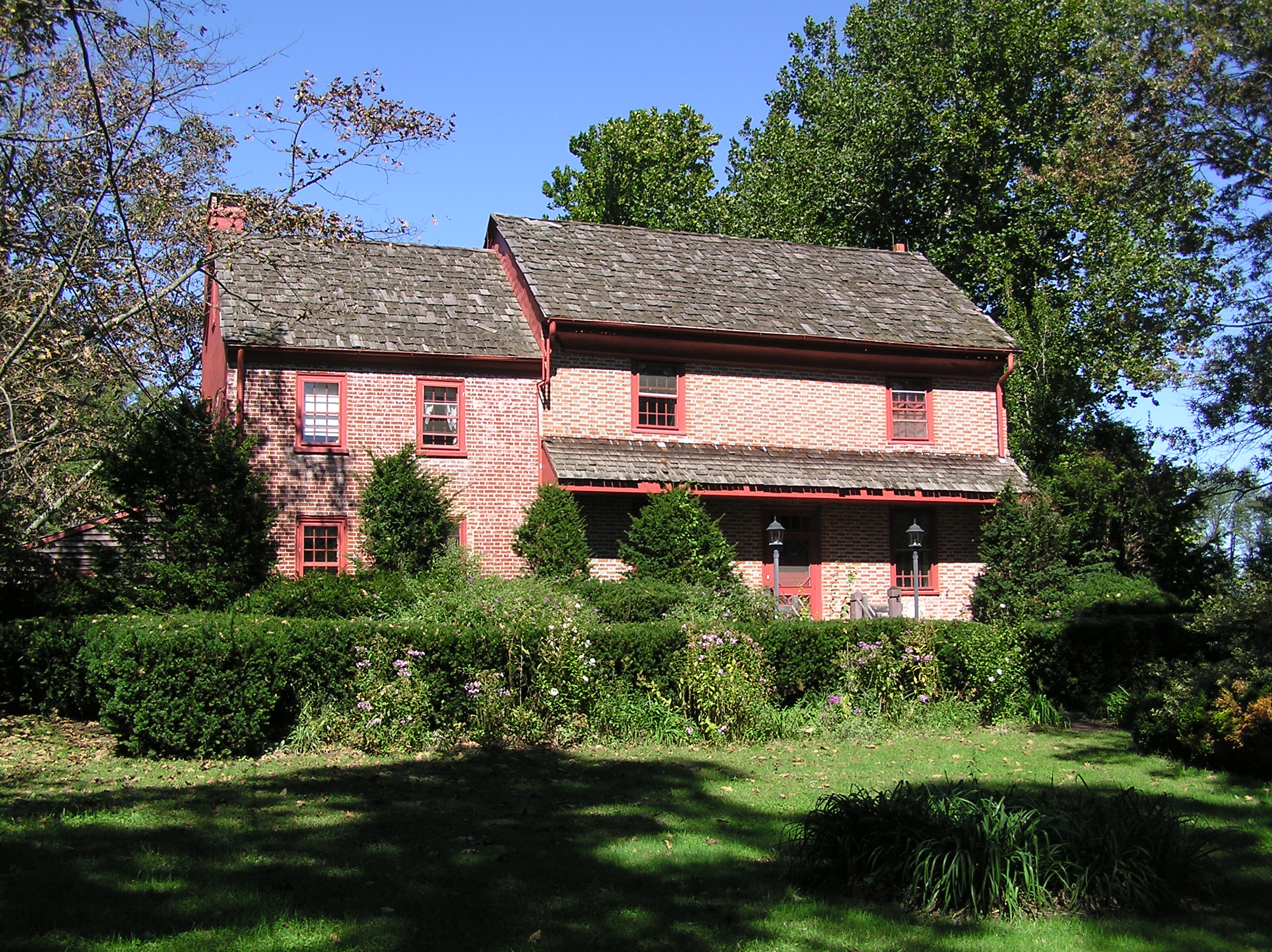

- Location within Burlington County, New Jersey Location within New Jersey Location within the United States
- Location: 17 Pemberton Road, Vincentown, New Jersey
- Coordinates: 39°56′23″N 74°44′44″W
- Area: 12.3 acres (5.0 ha)
- Built: 1753
- Architectural style: Georgian
- NRHP reference No.: 92000975
- NJRHP No.: 868

Significant dates
- Added to NRHP: August 4, 1992
- Designated NJRHP: June 25, 1992

The Bishop–Irick Farmstead is a historic farmhouse at 17 Pemberton Road in the Vincentown section of Southampton Township of Burlington County, New Jersey. It was added to the National Register of Historic Places on August 4, 1992, for its significance in agriculture, architecture, and politics/government. It is now used as the headquarters of the Pinelands Preservation Alliance.

== History ==
The oldest part of the house was built by John and Rebecca Bishop in 1753 for their 170-acre (69 ha) farm. The property was solely in the Bishop family until c. 1832, when Emeline Bishop married John Stockton Irick, who then owned it. In 1932, the Bishop–Irick family sold the property and it became a smaller dairy farm. The land was subsequently subdivided, leaving the farmhouse on a 12-acre (4.9 ha) lot. It is now used by the Pinelands Preservation Alliance for offices, the Pinelands Visitors Center, and a nature trail.

== Description ==
The farmhouse is a two and one-half story brick building with Georgian architecture. It features patterned brickwork using both Flemish bond and English bond. The barn, built in 1932, is a well-preserved example of a Louden barn in the area.

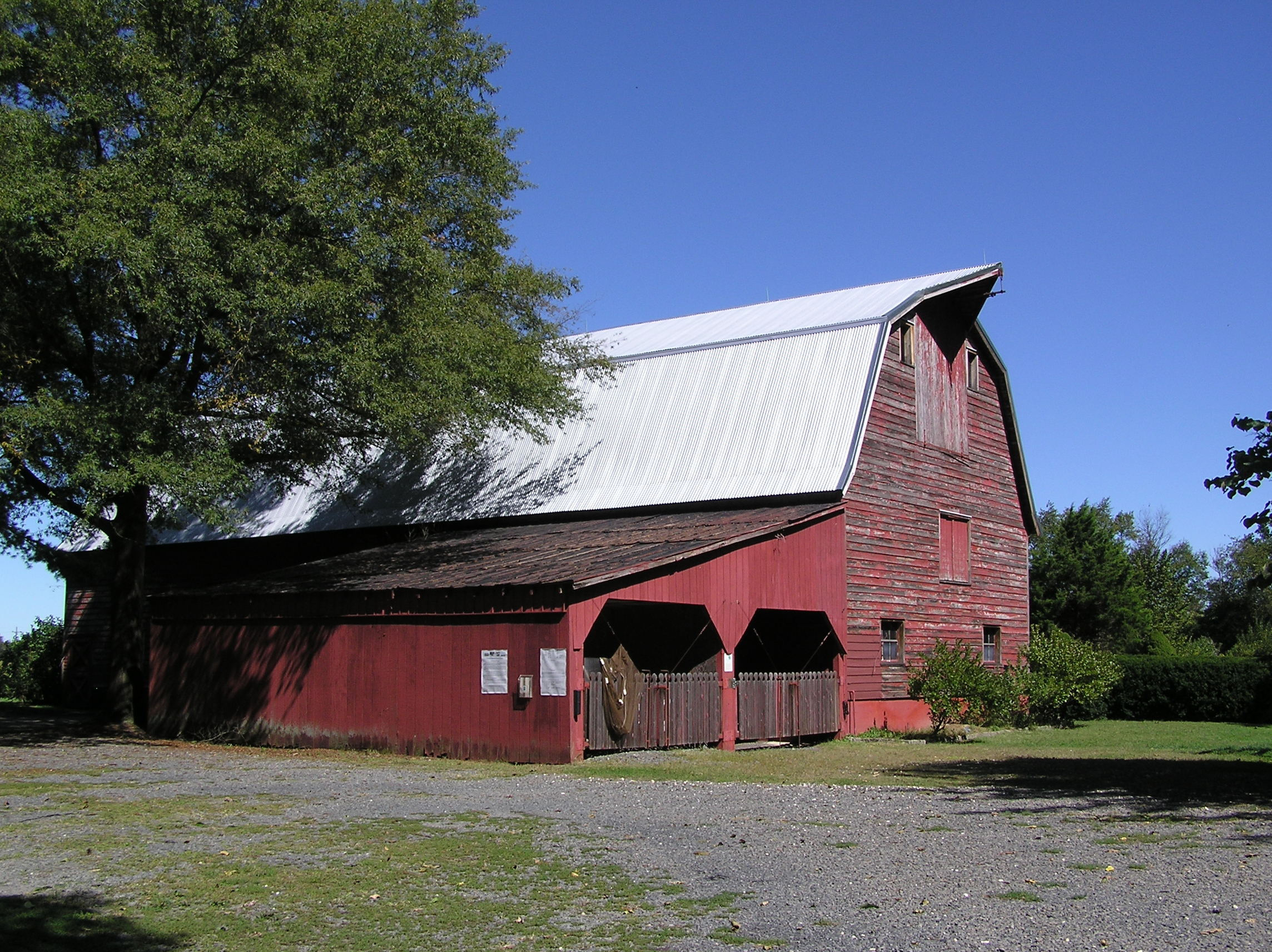
Barn, built in 1932

== See also ==
- National Register of Historic Places listings in Burlington County, New Jersey
- List of the oldest buildings in New Jersey
