= Vincentown, New Jersey =

Place in Burlington County, New Jersey, United States

- Census-designated place
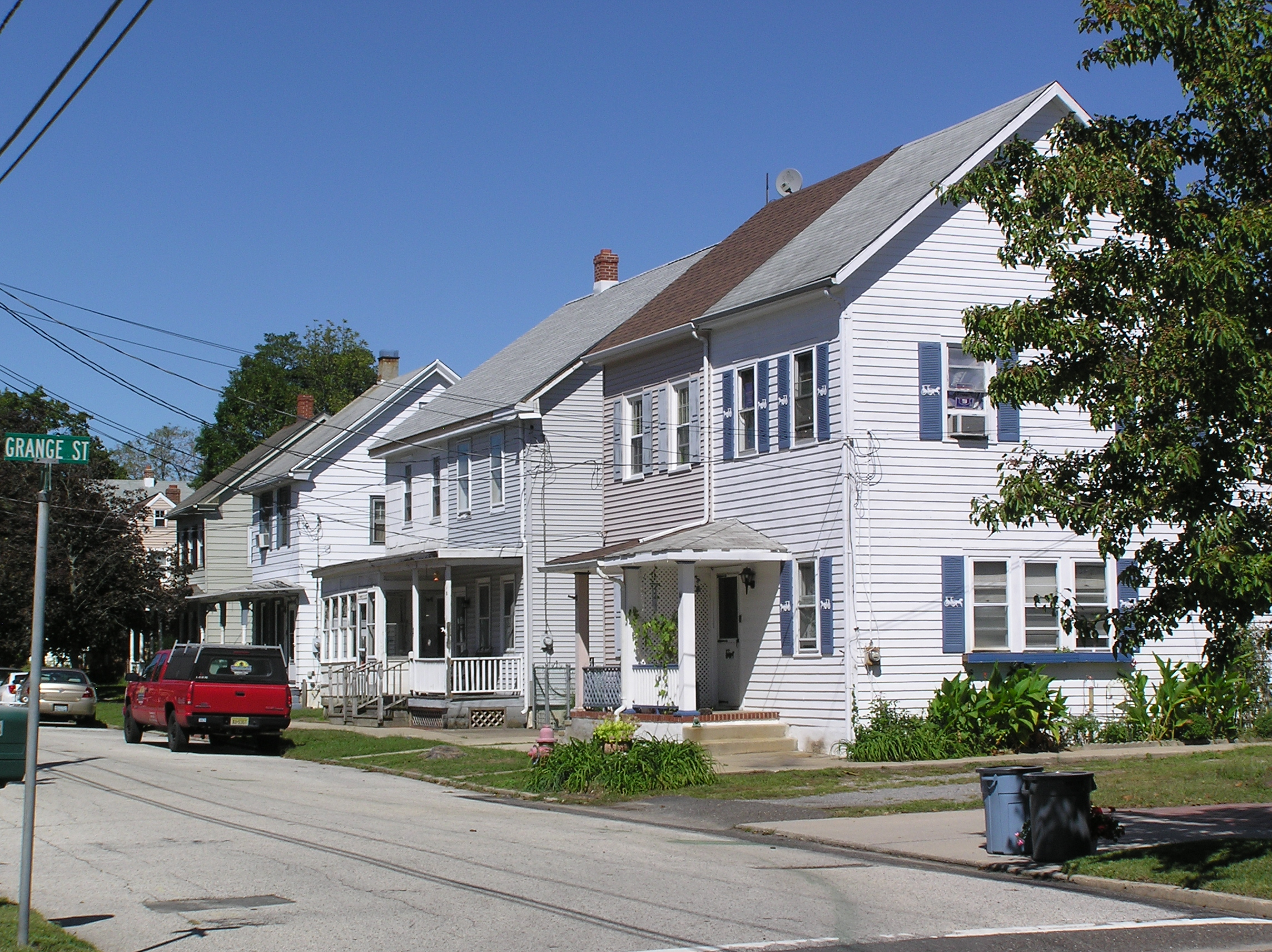
- Historic houses on Plum Street

- Location in Burlington County Location in New Jersey Location in the United States
- Coordinates: 39°56′02″N 74°44′55″W
- Country: United States
- State: New Jersey
- County: Burlington
- Township: Southampton
- Named for: Vincent Leeds

Area
  - Total: 0.59 sq mi (1.52 km^{2})
  - Land: 0.54 sq mi (1.41 km^{2})
  - Water: 0.042 sq mi (0.11 km^{2})
- Elevation: 39 ft (12 m)

Population (2020)
  - Total: 535
  - Density: 985/sq mi (380.5/km^{2})
- Time zone: UTC−05:00 (Eastern (EST))
  - Summer (DST): UTC−04:00 (Eastern (EDT))
- ZIP Code: 08088
- Area codes: 609, 640
- FIPS code: 34-76040
- GNIS feature ID: 881465; 2806213

Vincentown is an unincorporated community and census-designated place (CDP) located on the South Branch Rancocas Creek in Southampton Township of Burlington County, New Jersey. The area is served as United States Postal Service ZIP Code 08088. As of the 2020 census, Vincentown had a population of 535.

== Demographics ==
Historical population
Census	Pop.	Note	%±
2020	535		—
U.S. Decennial Census

Vincentown first appeared as a census designated place in the 2020 U.S. census.

Vincentown CDP, New Jersey – Racial and ethnic composition Note: the US Census treats Hispanic/Latino as an ethnic category. This table excludes Latinos from the racial categories and assigns them to a separate category. Hispanics/Latinos may be of any race.
Race / Ethnicity (NH = Non-Hispanic)	Pop 2020	2020
White alone (NH)	452	84.49%
Black or African American alone (NH)	15	2.80%
Native American or Alaska Native alone (NH)	0	0.00%
Asian alone (NH)	5	0.93%
Native Hawaiian or Pacific Islander alone (NH)	0	0.00%
Other race alone (NH)	0	0.00%
Mixed race or Multiracial (NH)	24	4.49%
Hispanic or Latino (any race)	39	7.29%
Total	535	100.00%

== History ==
In 1743, Vincent Leeds purchased the land where the community is now built. It was later named after him, Vincent's Town. Previously, the village had been known as Brimstone Neck.

== Historic district ==
- Vincentown Historic District
- U.S. National Register of Historic Places
- U.S. Historic district
- New Jersey Register of Historic Places
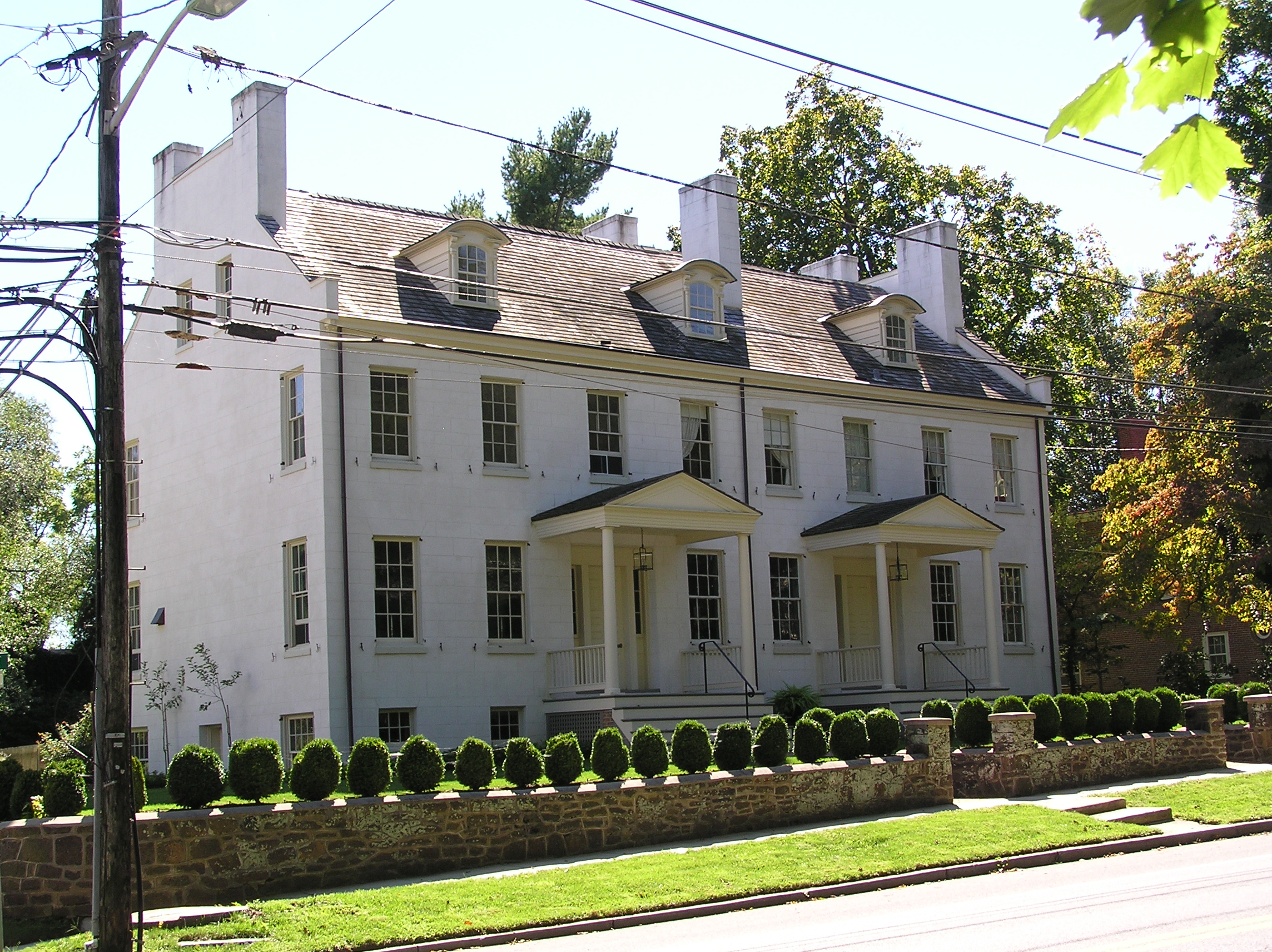
- John Woolston House
- Location: Roughly bounded by Mill, Church, Pleasant, Main, and Race Streets, and Red Lion Road
- Area: 92 acres (37 ha)
- Architectural style: Greek Revival, Late Victorian, Federal
- NRHP reference No.: 87002107
- NJRHP No.: 870

Significant dates
- Added to NRHP: September 21, 1988
- Designated NJRHP: April 16, 1987

The Vincentown Historic District is a 92-acre (37 ha) historic district roughly bounded by Mill, Church, Pleasant, Main, and Race Streets, and Red Lion Road encompassing the community. It was added to the National Register of Historic Places on September 21, 1988 for its significance in architecture, commerce, industry, religion, and social history. The district includes 160 contributing buildings and 3 contributing sites. The John Woolston House, a 2 1/2-story brick house with Federal style, was previously documented by the Historic American Buildings Survey in 1938. The house at 57 Main Street is a three-story Italianate style house featuring a cupola with a tree-type finial. It was built c. 1865 and is a key contributing property.

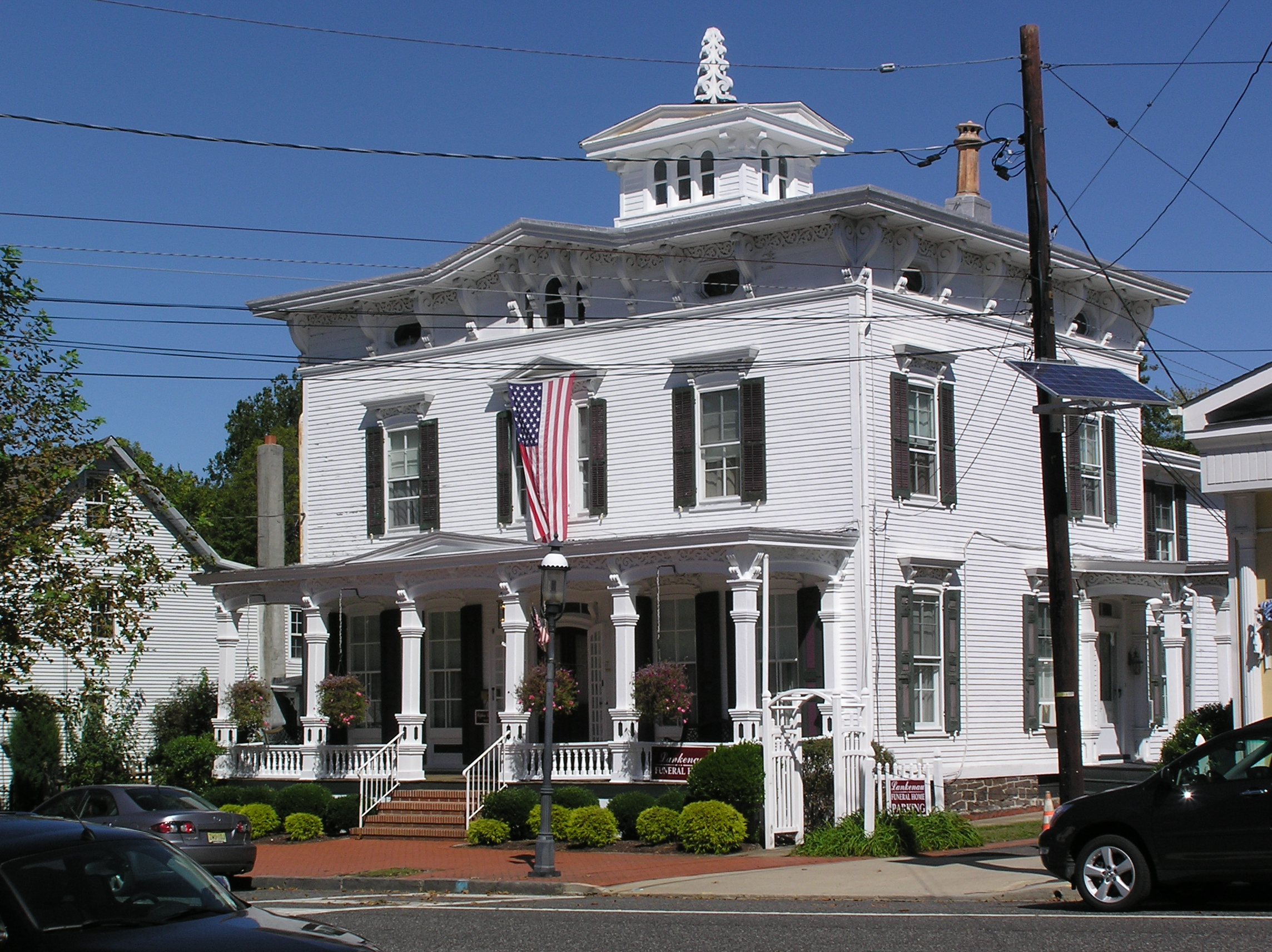
Italianate house at 57 Main Street

== Transportation ==
Red Lion Airport is located in Vincentown.

The Vincentown Branch of the Burlington County Railroad opened a line into the town from Ewansville, New Jersey on May 10, 1864. Soon after its opening, it was leased by the Camden and Burlington County Railroad, then by the Camden and Amboy Railroad and the Pennsylvania Railroad. The branch line to Vincentown was built to serve marl pits to the south of town. By the 1890s, it had largely shifted to handling dairy traffic. It was abandoned in 1927.

== Education ==
Its school districts are Southampton Township School District (elementary and middle school) and Lenape Regional School District (high school). All residents of Southampton Township are zoned to Seneca High School.

== Points of interest ==
- The Pinelands Preservation Alliance has its headquarters and visitor center at the Bishop–Irick Farmstead, which is listed on the NRHP.
- DeMastro Vineyards

== Notable people ==
People who were born in, residents of, or otherwise closely associated with Vincentown include:

- Samuel A. Dobbins (1814–1886), represented New Jersey's 2nd congressional district in the United States House of Representatives from 1873–1877.
- Brad Ecklund (1922–2010), center who played five seasons in the NFL.
- Job H. Lippincott (1842–1900), United States Attorney for the District of New Jersey and Associate Justice of the New Jersey Supreme Court.
- Chauncey Morehouse (1902–1980), jazz drummer.
- Jim Saxton (born 1943), Congressman from 1984 to 2009.
- Beulah Woolston (1828–1886), pioneering missionary teacher in China.

== See also ==
- National Register of Historic Places listings in Burlington County, New Jersey
