= South Branch Rancocas Creek =

River in New Jersey, United States

Coordinates: 39°58′21″N 74°49′11″W

The South Branch Rancocas Creek, or Lumberton Branch is a 21.7-mile-long (34.9 km) tributary of Rancocas Creek in Burlington County, New Jersey in the United States. The South Branch Rancocas Creek drains an area of 144 square miles. Much of the upland agriculture within the Rancocas Creek basin lies inside the South Branch Rancocas Creek basin. It is among the least developed parts of the Rancocas Creek watershed.

The South Branch is tidal to a point between the mouth of the Southwest Branch Rancocas Creek and Eayrestown. The head of navigation on the creek was Lumberton. By the late nineteenth century, steamboat navigation generally ended at Cooks Landing, near Hainesport, New Jersey, with light sailing vessels and barges occasionally venturing upstream to the vicinity of Lumberton to deliver agricultural lime. From Hainesport to the mouth of the creek, sand and gravel mining generated barge traffic through the early twentieth century.

== Tributaries ==
- Friendship Creek
- Southwest Branch Rancocas Creek
- Masons Creek
- Bobbys Run
- Cedar Run
- Beaverdam Creek
- Jade Run

== See also ==
- List of rivers of New Jersey
- North Branch Rancocas Creek
- Rancocas Creek
- Southwest Branch Rancocas Creek
