= Little Creek (New Jersey) =

River in New Jersey, United States

Coordinates: 39°56′35″N 74°47′57″W

Little Creek is a 12.58 mile long river in Burlington County, New Jersey, United States. It drains into the Southwest Branch Rancocas Creek. Little Creek itself drains an area of 6.32 square miles. Little Creek has been found to be impaired for primary recreation, but safe and suitable for aquatic life. Little Creek drains mostly a suburban/rural area, and has been classified as a low-gradient stream.

== Tributaries ==
- Bear Swamp River

== See also ==
- List of rivers of New Jersey
