= Sharps Run (New Jersey) =

Stream in New Jersey, United States

Coordinates: 39°54′27″N 74°48′46″W

Sharps Run is a 4.04-mile (6.50 km) stream that drains into the Southwest Branch Rancocas Creek, in Burlington County, New Jersey. It drains an area of 4.41 square miles (11.4 km^{2}).

Sharps Run starts in Evesham Township, and flows eastward into Medford Township. Sharps Run has been defined as a low-gradient stream. In recent years, Sharps Run has improved in water quality.

Sharps Run's headwaters lie in Evesham Township, near N. Elmwood Road, and its confluence with Southwest Branch Rancocas Creek is in Medford Township. Sharps Run is generally a slow-flowing river, but has been known to flood and flow rapidly during rain. It drains mostly a suburban/rural area, with plenty of woodlands and agriculture.

Freshwater emergent wetlands and freshwater forested wetlands can be found along Sharps Run. Because of marl excavations in the past, there are still some pits that have filled with water and are now wetlands.

The elevation ranges from about 55 to 60 feet (17 to 18 m) feet at the start of the river, and 20 feet (6.1 m) at the mouth, though the tributaries have higher elevations near the headwaters.

== History ==
The name "Sharps Run" has been attributed to maps as early as the early/mid 19th century. Along the banks of the river was much farmland, as well as marl excavations. Sharps Run marl was used very much in the 19th century, and contributed to the wealth of the farming industry in the area, as the marl was used for fertilizing purposes to give health to the soil. There have not been any major accidents or chemical spills along the river.

== Conservation ==
The Barton Arboretum is a reserve in Medford Township, near the mouth of Sharps Run, that has protected some of the forests and floodplains along the river, near County Route 541 and Route 70. There are trails along the river here. The riparian buffer zone of Sharps Run, despite recent developments near the river, has remained a healthy size.

== Water quality ==
Sharps Run has had problems with fecal coliform and pathogens in the past, mostly due to non-point sources such as excessive goose populations and wastes, and agricultural runoff. Sharps Run also has a problem with phosphorus, and this can also be said to have come from non-point sources. There are some farms near the banks of the river, and fertilizers used on these farms run off into the river.

== Tributaries ==
There are no named tributaries, but Sharps Run has many smaller tributaries throughout its watershed. Along the headwaters of Sharps Run, especially, there are many tributaries.

== See also ==
- List of rivers of New Jersey
