= Southwest Branch Rancocas Creek =

River in New Jersey, United States

Coordinates: 39°56′56″N 74°47′46″W

The Southwest Branch Rancocas Creek is a 13.8-mile-long (22.2 km) tributary of the South Branch Rancocas Creek in Burlington County, New Jersey in the United States.

The Southwest Branch Rancocas Creek drains approximately 142 square kilometers.

== Tributaries ==
- Sharps Run
- Little Creek

== See also ==
- List of rivers of New Jersey
- North Branch Rancocas Creek
- Rancocas Creek
- South Branch Rancocas Creek
