= Rancocas Creek =

Tributary of the Delaware River in southwestern New Jersey

Coordinates: 40.023°N 74.919°W

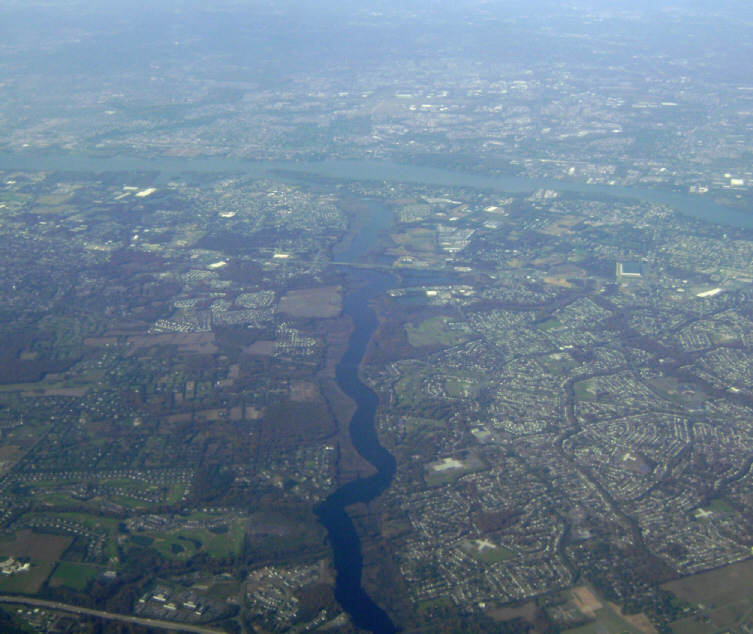
The main stem of Rancocas Creek between Interstate 295 and the Delaware River viewed from the air in November 2011.

Rancocas Creek is a tributary of the Delaware River in southwestern New Jersey in the United States. The creek's main stem is 8.3 miles (13.4 km) long, with a North Branch of 28.3 miles (45.5 km) and a South Branch flowing 21.7 miles (34.9 km). The creek system drains a rural agricultural and forested area on the western edge of the Pinelands north and northeast of Camden and the New Jersey suburbs of Philadelphia.

== Overview ==
Rancocas Creek rises as two main branches in the Pinelands National Reserve. The North Branch rises in northern Burlington County, in Mirror Lake, just south of Fort Dix. It flows west-northwest past Mount Holly.

The South Branch rises in central Burlington County near Chatsworth and flows generally northwest. It receives the 13.8-mile-long (22.2 km) Southwest Branch from the south approximately 5 miles (8 km) south of Mount Holly. The North and South branches join near Rancocas State Park, approximately 3 miles (5 km) west of Mount Holly, near the crossing of the New Jersey Turnpike and Interstate 295. A few hundred yards downstream of the Interstate 295 and New Jersey Turnpike bridges, Burlington County Route 635 passed over the Creek on a bridge built less than 4 feet (1.2 m) over the average water level; this bridge had been closed for several years, and was physically removed in its entirety in 2020/2021. This bridge had the capability for the center section of the bridge to swivel from the perpendicular to the river to parallel, to allow small boat traffic through. After rehabilitation of the bridge in the 1980s, the powered mechanism was removed due to the near-lack of creek barge traffic and the expense of maintenance. The bridge could be opened in case of emergency, but required manual labor to be swiveled open.

The entire mainstem, as well as the lower portions of its two main branches, is a freshwater tidal estuary and is considered navigable. The tidal portion ends near Mount Holly on the North Branch and Eayrestown on the South Branch.

== Tributaries ==
- North Branch Rancocas Creek
- South Branch Rancocas Creek
- Southwest Branch Rancocas Creek

== Accidents ==
On April 23, 1853, the engineer of Camden & Amboy's 2 p.m. train out of Philadelphia missed stop signals and ran his train off an open drawspan between modern-day Riverside and Delanco on Rancocas Creek. There were no fatalities.

== See also ==
- List of New Jersey rivers
- Lists of rail accidents
- Rancocas, New Jersey
- Rancocas Woods, New Jersey
