= North Branch Rancocas Creek =

River in New Jersey, United States

Coordinates: 39.979534°N 74.744975°W

The North Branch Rancocas Creek, also known as the Mount Holly Branch, is a 31-mile-long (50 km) tributary of Rancocas Creek in southwestern New Jersey in the United States.

The creek starts in the Pine Barrens of Brendan T. Byrne State Forest and Fort Dix Military Reservation, near Browns Mills.

From its confluence with Rancocas Creek, tidewater extends upstream to the upper end of Mount Holly.

The North Branch Rancocas Creek drains an area of 167 square miles. The creek is among the more developed portions of the Rancocas Creek watershed.

== Transport ==
Timber rafts were launched on the upper waters of the North Branch during the eighteenth century. A milldam had been constructed across the stream just above Mount Holly as early as 1723. Some rafts were taken out at a wharf here, while others passed over a raft gate in the dam and were floated down to the Delaware River. During this period, an attempt was made to render the creek navigable above Mount Holly by building a lock in the millrace below the dam, but it was never completed, and the remains were filled in during 1811 during the erection of a new sawmill. Rafting had long ceased by 1831, when the dam was rebuilt without a raft gate. Below the dam, small boats operated on the creek between Mount Holly and Philadelphia. Timber was also towed up the creek to be cut at the sawmill at Mount Holly.

The first steamboat up the creek was the "Norristown", which ran from Philadelphia to Mount Holly in 1823. In 1824, the Mount Holly and Rancocas Steamboat Company was chartered, and briefly operated regular passenger service with the newly-built "Lafayette" between Philadelphia and Hillyard's wharf in Mount Holly. However, the "Lafayette" had too deep a draft for easy navigation on the creek, particularly at low tide. Service was soon discontinued and the steamer sold at Philadelphia in 1826. However, other steamers succeeded the Lafayette and steamer traffic continued on the North Branch through the end of the nineteenth century. Continued shoaling rendered it unsuitable for traffic, and an unfavorable report by the US Army Corps of Engineers in 1910 on the value of dredging and maintaining a channel up to Mount Holly led to its abandonment for navigation.

== Tributaries ==
- Greenwood Branch
- Mount Misery Brook
- Powells Run
- Budd Run

== See also ==
- List of rivers of New Jersey
- Rancocas Creek
- South Branch Rancocas Creek
- Southwest Branch Rancocas Creek
