= Mount Holly Cemetery (Mount Holly, New Jersey) =

Cemetery in Burlington County, New Jersey, US

Coordinates: 40°00′05″N 74°47′10″W

Mount Holly Cemetery is a cemetery located in Mount Holly Township in the U.S. state of New Jersey.

== Notable interments ==
- Samuel A. Dobbins (1814–1905), represented New Jersey's 2nd congressional district in the US House of Representatives, 1873–77
- Samuel C. Forker (1821–1900), represented New Jersey's 2nd congressional district in the US House of Representatives, 1871–73
- Joseph H. Gaskill (1851–1935), judge on the New Jersey Court of Common Pleas and Justice of the New Jersey Supreme Court
- Job H. Lippincott (1842–1900), US Attorney for the District of New Jersey and Associate Justice of the New Jersey Supreme Court
- William Procter Jr. (1817–1874), developer of American pharmacy
- William Norton Shinn (1782–1871), represented New Jersey in Congress at-large, 1833–37
