= Red Lion Airport =

Coordinates: 39°54′14.946″N 074°44′58.38″W

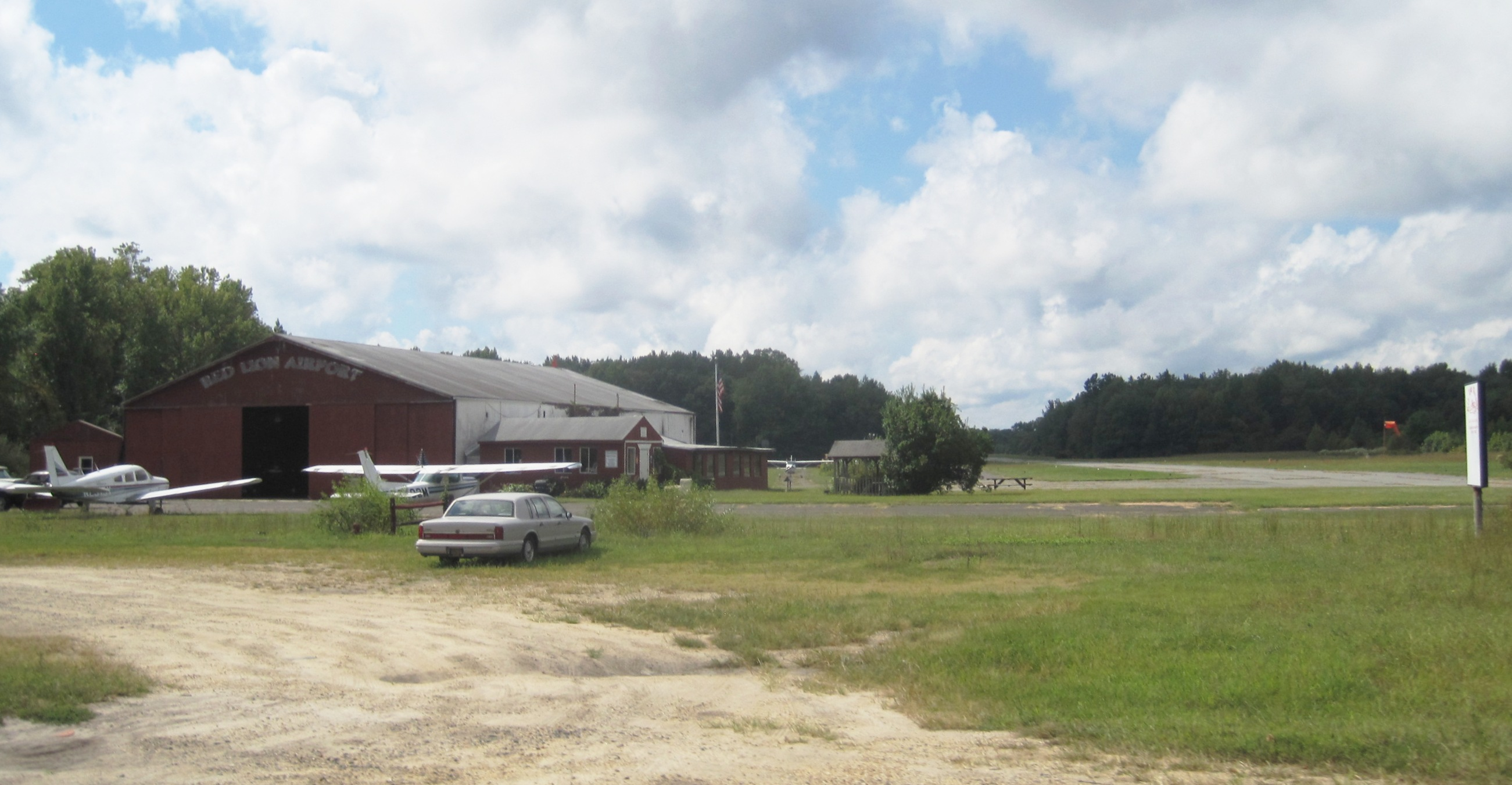
- IATA: none; ICAO: none; FAA LID: JY73

Summary
- Airport type: Private
- Owner: Affiliated Air Services, Inc.
- Operator: Raymond P. Daniels
- Serves: Vincentown section of Southampton Township, New Jersey
- Location: Burlington County, New Jersey
- Elevation AMSL: 54 ft / 17 m

Map
- Interactive map of Red Lion Airport

Runways
Direction	Length		Surface
Direction	ft	m	Surface
5/23	2,880	878	Asphalt

Statistics (2008)
- Aircraft operations: 5,920
- Based aircraft: 33
- Source: Federal Aviation Administration

Red Lion Airport (FAA LID: JY73) is a private-use airport located 2 nautical miles (3.7 km; 2.3 mi) south of the central business district of the Vincentown section of Southampton Township, in Burlington County, New Jersey, United States. The airport is privately owned.

the red lion airport is 23 nautical miles from Philadelphia International Airport
