= Burrs Mill Brook =

Tributary of Friendship Creek in southern New Jersey

Coordinates: 39.87571°N 74.64629°W

A picture of water flowing through the former Birches Cranberry Company bogs.

Burrs Mill Brook is a 7.9-mile-long (12.7 km) tributary of Friendship Creek located in Southampton Township, New Jersey in the United States.

Burr's mill (historically known as Oak Mill), established by Joseph Burr in 1741, is a historical site that once featured a sawmill, a massive mill dam, and an adjacent family dwelling. The sawmill cut lumber crucial for early shipbuilding, housing, and roofing shingles. The massive dam was used to harness and control the slow-moving stream, creating the necessary water pressure to turn the mill's waterwheel. The dwelling is where Joseph Burr lived until his death in 1781. The property was inherited by his daughter Keziah Burr Howell. Later, the parcel of land that the mill was situated on was purchased by Martin Luther Haines of the Birches Cranberry Company, in the 1860s. Haines repurposed the old water networks left behind by Burr into cranberry bogs. This cranberry operation was successful for three generations, until 2004, when a catastrophic "1000-year flood event" struck Burlington County, causing multiple dam failures and washouts in the bogs. Undertaking a multi-million dollar rebuilding process would have been a large financial burden for the Birches Cranberry Company, resulting in the shutdown of the 140-year-old cranberry operation. In 2018, the NJ Conservation Foundation purchased the 442-acre tract that holds the abandoned cranberry bogs and location of Burrs mill. The property is currently open to the public and features hiking trails, dried up waterways, and the mill pond left behind by the historic mill dam.

== See also ==
- List of rivers of New Jersey
