= Bobbys Run =

Stream in Burlington County, New Jersey, U.S.

Coordinates: 39.96541°N 74.78964°W

Bobbys Run is a stream in Burlington County, New Jersey, in the United States.

Bobbys Run was previously known as Dimsdale Run; both names honor Dr. Robert Dimsdale, a 17th-century landowner.

== See also ==
- List of rivers of New Jersey
