= Eayrestown, New Jersey =

Populated place in Burlington County, New Jersey, US

- Unincorporated community
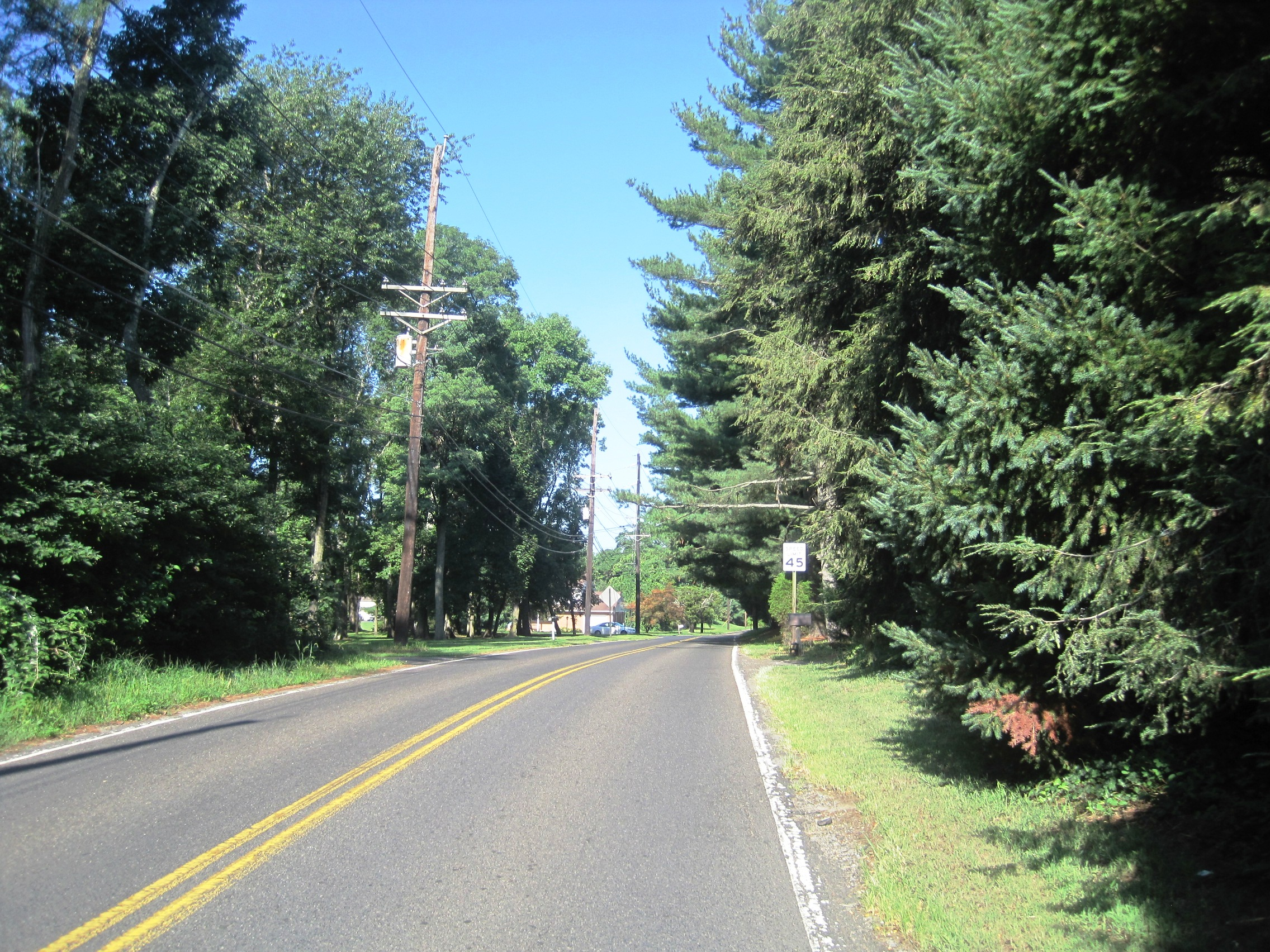
- Bridge Road in Eayrestown

- Location of Eayrestown in Burlington County (Inset: Location of county within the state of New Jersey) Eayrestown (New Jersey) Eayrestown (the United States)
- Coordinates: 39°56′42″N 74°47′25″W
- Country: United States
- State: New Jersey
- County: Burlington
- Township: Lumberton
- Elevation: 52 ft (16 m)
- Time zone: UTC−05:00 (Eastern (EST))
  - Summer (DST): UTC−04:00 (EDT)
- GNIS feature ID: 876080

Eayrestown is an unincorporated community located within Lumberton Township in Burlington County, in the U.S. state of New Jersey. The settlement is named for Richard and Elizabeth Eayres, the first settlers of the site in the 1600s. It was also the first settlement in what is now Lumberton Township. The settlement, located along the South Branch Rancocas Creek, was the site of numerous saw and gristmills early in its history and a picnic grove that attracted people from around the area. Today, numerous farms and housing developments dot the area.
