= Rancocas Woods, New Jersey =

Populated place in Burlington County, New Jersey, US

- Unincorporated community
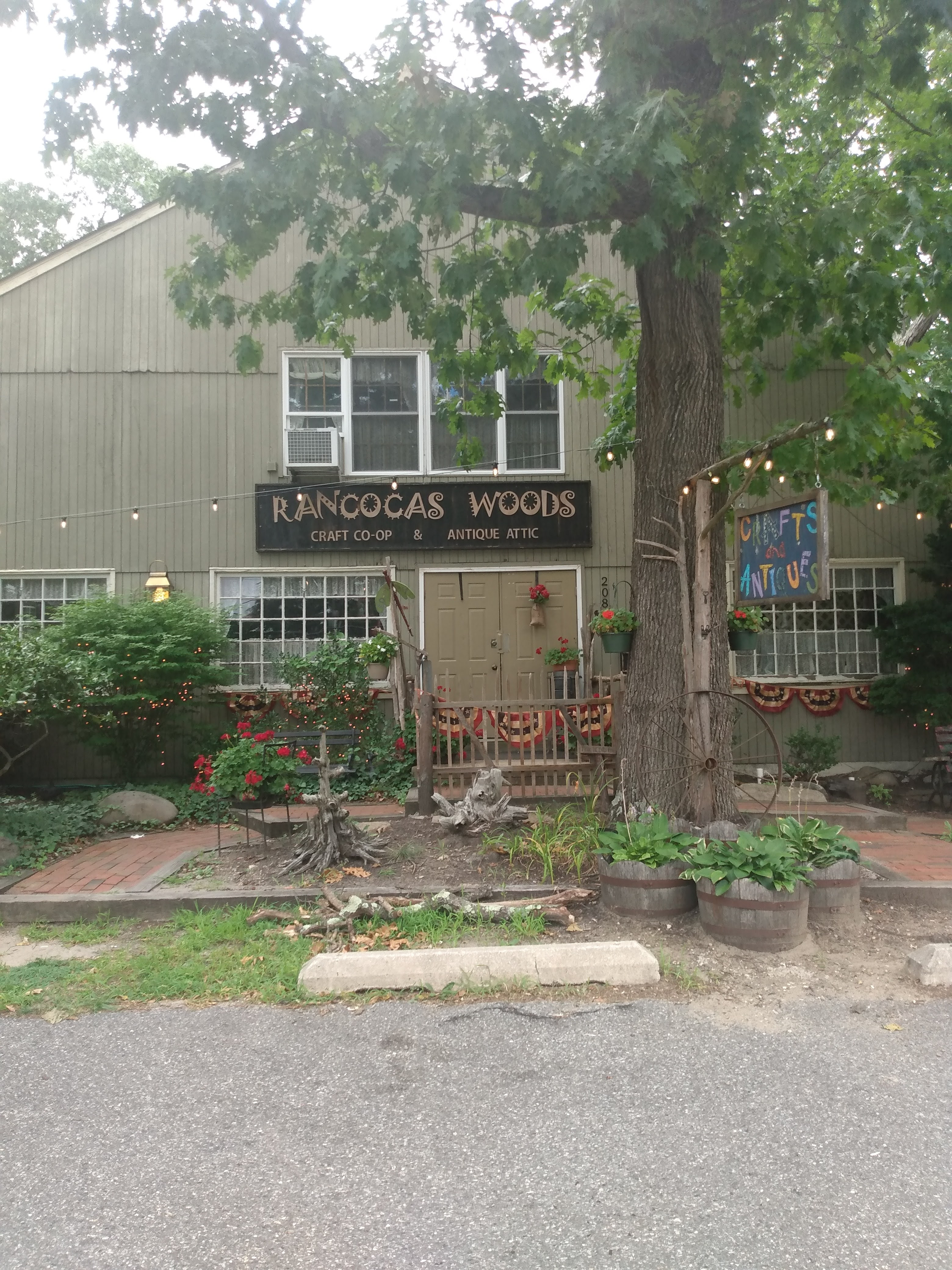

- Location in Burlington County (Inset: Burlington County in New Jersey) Rancocas Woods (New Jersey) Rancocas Woods (the United States)
- Coordinates: 39°59′20″N 74°51′37″W
- Country: United States
- State: New Jersey
- County: Burlington
- Township: Mount Laurel
- Elevation: 39 ft (12 m)
- Time zone: UTC−05:00 (Eastern (EST))
  - Summer (DST): UTC−04:00 (Eastern (EDT))
- ZIP Code: 08054
- Area codes: 609, 640
- GNIS feature ID: 879610

Rancocas Woods is an unincorporated community located within Mount Laurel Township in Burlington County, in the U.S. state of New Jersey.

The community was developed on the site of an amusement park. Houses in Rancocas Woods were first built in the 1930s. There were problems with the community when first developed. No sewers were installed, because of limited drainage, which caused floods to occur during heavy rainstorms. The water pressure from fire hydrants was unsubstantial—the volunteer fire department had to pump its water from the nearby Rancocas Creek.

On July 11, 2018 the Mount Laurel Zoning Board voted to allow a section of commercial property to be zoned residential to allow the building of an apartment rental complex. This developer proposal will bring sewer and fire hydrants to this area, but will change the makeup of the shops at so-called Main Street Mount Laurel. The proposal was met with public backlash.

== Location ==
Rancocas Woods is located on the Rancocas Creek, a major river that empties into the Delaware River. Exit 43 on Interstate 295 can be used to access Rancocas Woods. There is no direct exit on the New Jersey Turnpike, however, the nearest exits to Rancocas Woods are exit 4 (Route 73 – Mount Laurel) and exit 5 (County Route 541 – Burlington, Mount Holly).

== Transportation ==
New Jersey Transit provides bus service to and from Philadelphia on the 413 route.
