= Southampton Township, New Jersey =

Township in Burlington County, New Jersey, US

- Township
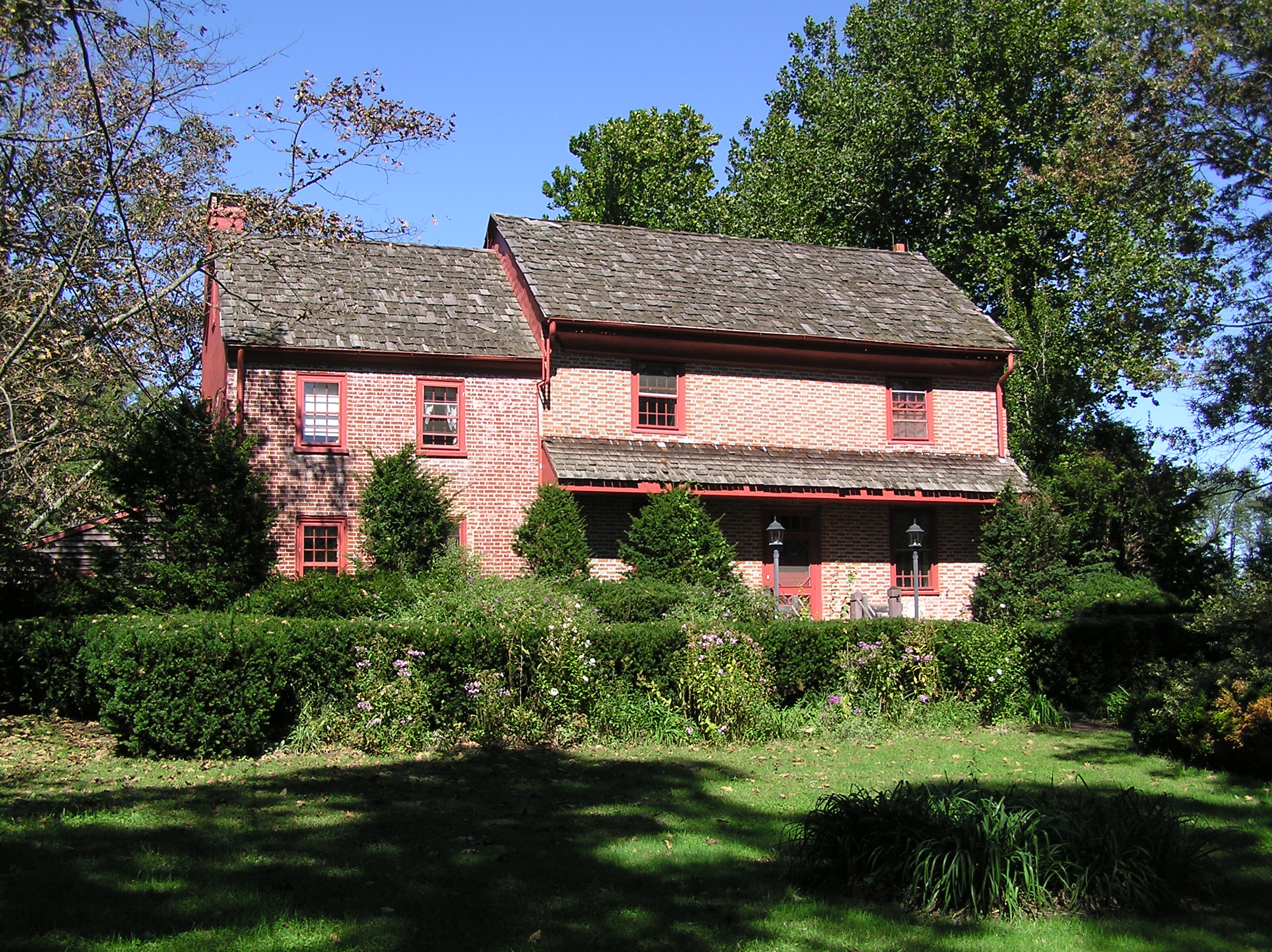
- Bishop–Irick Farmstead in Vincentown

- Seal

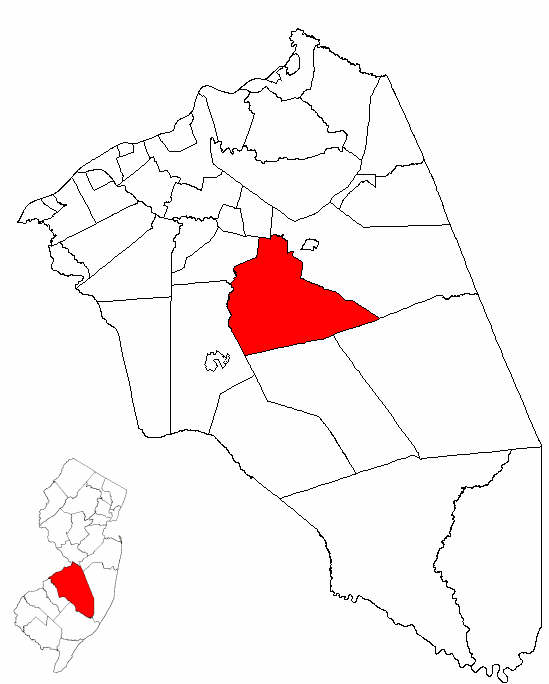
- Southampton Township highlighted in Burlington County. Inset map: Burlington County highlighted in the State of New Jersey.

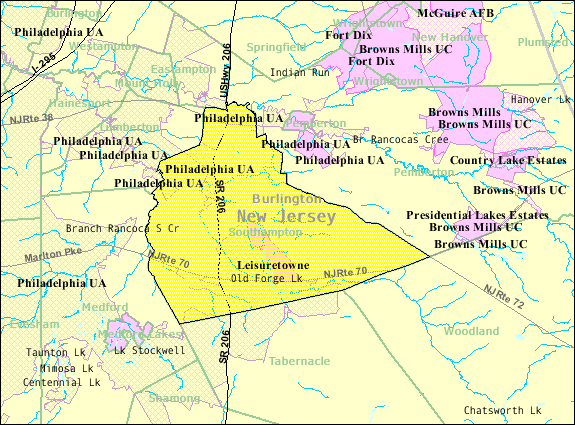
- Census Bureau map of Southampton Township, New Jersey

- Location in Burlington County Location in New Jersey Location in the United States
- Coordinates: 39.915935°N 74.717501°W
- Country: United States
- State: New Jersey
- County: Burlington
- Incorporated: March 10, 1845 as Coaxen Township
- Renamed: April 1, 1845 as Southampton Township

Government
  - Type: Township
  - Body: Township Committee
  - Mayor: Michael Mikulski (R, term ends December 31, 2023)
  - Administrator / Municipal clerk: Kathleen D. Hoffman

Area
  - Total: 44.44 sq mi (115.10 km^{2})
  - Land: 43.96 sq mi (113.85 km^{2})
  - Water: 0.48 sq mi (1.25 km^{2}) 1.08%
  - Rank: 44th of 565 in state 7th of 40 in county
- Elevation: 36 ft (11 m)

Population (2020)
  - Total: 10,317
  - Estimate (2023): 10,334
  - Rank: 238th of 565 in state 14th of 40 in county
  - Density: 234.7/sq mi (90.6/km^{2})
  - Rank: 493rd of 565 in state 34th of 40 in county
- Time zone: UTC−05:00 (Eastern (EST))
  - Summer (DST): UTC−04:00 (Eastern (EDT))
- ZIP Code: 08088
- Area code: 609 exchanges: 268, 801, 859
- FIPS code: 3400568610
- GNIS feature ID: 0882090
- Website: www.southamptonnj.org

Southampton Township is a township in Burlington County, in the U.S. state of New Jersey. As of the 2020 United States census, the township's population was 10,317, a decrease of 147 (−1.4%) from the 10,464 recorded at the 2010 census, which in turn reflected an increase of 76 (+0.7%) from the 10,388 counted in the 2000 census. The township, and all of Burlington County, is a part of the Philadelphia metropolitan area.

What is now Southampton was originally incorporated as Coaxen Township by an act of the New Jersey Legislature on March 10, 1845, from portions of Northampton Township (now known as Mount Holly). The name lasted for about three weeks when it was renamed Southampton Township on April 1, 1845. As the population increased, portions of the township were taken to form Pemberton Township (March 10, 1846), Shamong Township (February 19, 1852), Lumberton (March 14, 1860), Woodland Township (March 7, 1866) and Tabernacle Township (March 22, 1901).

== Geography ==
According to the U.S. Census Bureau, the township had a total area of 44.44 square miles (115.10 km^{2}), including 43.96 square miles (113.85 km^{2}) of land and 0.48 square miles (1.25 km^{2}) of water (1.08%). The township is located within the New Jersey Pine Barrens.

Leisuretowne (2020 Census population of 3,842) and Vincentown (535) are unincorporated communities and census-designated places (CDP) located within Southampton Township. Other unincorporated communities, localities and place names located partially or completely within the township include Beaverville, Buddtown, Burrs Mill, Chairville, Crescent Heights, Ewansville, Ewingville, Hampton Lakes, Medford Park, Oak Shade, Red Lion, Retreat and Sandtown.

The township borders the Burlington County municipalities of Eastampton, Lumberton, Medford, Pemberton Township, Tabernacle and Woodland Township.

The township is one of 56 South Jersey municipalities that are included within the Pinelands National Reserve, a protected natural area of unique ecology covering 1,100,000 acres (450,000 ha), that has been classified as a United States Biosphere Reserve and established by Congress in 1978 as the nation's first National Reserve. Part of the township is included in the state-designated Pinelands Area, which includes portions of Burlington County, along with areas in Atlantic, Camden, Cape May, Cumberland, Gloucester and Ocean counties.

=== Climate ===
Month	Jan	Feb	Mar	Apr	May	Jun	Jul	Aug	Sep	Oct	Nov	Dec
High	42 F	45 F	54 F	65 F	75 F	83 F	87 F	86 F	79 F	69 F	57 F	46 F
Avg	36 F	36 F	44 F	54 F	60 F	74 F	77 F	72 F	68 F	54 F	44 F	38 F
Low	22 F	24 F	31 F	39 F	49 F	58 F	63 F	61 F	54 F	43 F	35 F	27 F

== Demographics ==
Historical population
Census	Pop.	Note	%±
1850	3,545	*	—
1860	2,558	*	−27.8%
1870	2,374	*	−7.2%
1880	2,269		−4.4%
1890	1,849		−18.5%
1900	1,904	*	3.0%
1910	1,778		−6.6%
1920	1,641		−7.7%
1930	1,637		−0.2%
1940	1,813		10.8%
1950	2,341		29.1%
1960	3,166		35.2%
1970	4,982		57.4%
1980	8,808		76.8%
1990	10,202		15.8%
2000	10,388		1.8%
2010	10,464		0.7%
2020	10,317		−1.4%
2023 (est.)	10,334		0.2%
Population sources:1850–2000 1850–1920 1850–1870; 1850 1870 1880–1890; 1890–1910 1910–1930; 1940–2000 2000; 2010 2020 * = Lost territory in previous decade.

=== 2010 census ===
The 2010 United States census counted 10,464 people, 4,746 households, and 3,042 families in the township. The population density was 239.6 per square mile (92.5/km^{2}). There were 5,024 housing units at an average density of 115.1 per square mile (44.4/km^{2}). The racial makeup was 94.50% (9,888) White, 2.21% (231) Black or African American, 0.11% (12) Native American, 1.33% (139) Asian, 0.01% (1) Pacific Islander, 0.49% (51) from other races, and 1.36% (142) from two or more races. Hispanic or Latino of any race were 2.15% (225) of the population.

Of the 4,746 households, 16.7% had children under the age of 18; 52.6% were married couples living together; 7.8% had a female householder with no husband present and 35.9% were non-families. Of all households, 32.3% were made up of individuals and 22.9% had someone living alone who was 65 years of age or older. The average household size was 2.20 and the average family size was 2.77.

15.6% of the population were under the age of 18, 5.7% from 18 to 24, 15.9% from 25 to 44, 30.8% from 45 to 64, and 32.0% who were 65 years of age or older. The median age was 53.9 years. For every 100 females, the population had 88.0 males. For every 100 females ages 18 and older there were 85.5 males.

The Census Bureau's 2006–2010 American Community Survey showed that (in 2010 inflation-adjusted dollars) median household income was $51,713 (with a margin of error of +/− $3,072) and the median family income was $73,598 (+/− $11,729). Males had a median income of $57,500 (+/− $8,015) versus $39,472 (+/− $4,560) for females. The per capita income for the borough was $34,493 (+/− $1,869). About 3.1% of families and 5.2% of the population were below the poverty line, including 6.1% of those under age 18 and 8.4% of those age 65 or over.

=== 2000 census ===
As of the 2000 United States census there were 10,388 people, 4,574 households, and 3,046 families residing in the township. The population density was 235.9 inhabitants per square mile (91.1/km^{2}). There were 4,751 housing units at an average density of 107.9 per square mile (41.7/km^{2}). The racial makeup of the township was 97.09% White, 1.20% African American, 0.28% Native American, 0.63% Asian, 0.30% from other races, and 0.50% from two or more races. Hispanic or Latino of any race were 1.29% of the population.

There were 4,574 households, out of which 19.8% had children under the age of 18 living with them, 57.2% were married couples living together, 6.8% had a female householder with no husband present, and 33.4% were non-families. 29.9% of all households were made up of individuals, and 21.3% had someone living alone who was 65 years of age or older. The average household size was 2.26 and the average family size was 2.79.

In the township the population was spread out, with 17.8% under the age of 18, 4.8% from 18 to 24, 21.2% from 25 to 44, 24.5% from 45 to 64, and 31.7% who were 65 years of age or older. The median age was 50 years. For every 100 females, there were 87.8 males. For every 100 females age 18 and over, there were 85.2 males.

The median income for a household in the township was $44,419, and the median income for a family was $57,419. Males had a median income of $45,785 versus $30,134 for females. The per capita income for the township was $26,977. About 2.6% of families and 3.9% of the population were below the poverty line, including 4.8% of those under age 18 and 2.5% of those age 65 or over.

== Government ==
=== Local government ===
Southampton Township is governed under the Township form of New Jersey municipal government, one of 141 municipalities (of the 564) statewide that use this form, the second-most commonly used form of government in the state. The Township Committee is comprised of five members, who are elected directly by the voters at-large in partisan elections to serve three-year terms of office on a staggered basis, with either one or two seats coming up for election each year as part of the November general election in a three-year cycle. At an annual reorganization meeting, the Township Committee selects one of its members to serve as Mayor for the year.

As of 2023, members of the Southampton Township Committee are Mayor Michael S. Mikulski II (R, term on committee ends December 31, 2025; term as mayor ends 2023), Deputy Mayor Ronald J. Heston (R, term on committee ends 2024; term as deputy mayor ends 2022), William J. Raftery (R, 2024), Elizabeth H. Rossell (R, 2025) and James F. Young Sr. (R, 2023).

=== Federal, state and county representation ===
Southampton Township is located in the 3rd Congressional District and is part of New Jersey's 8th state legislative district.

For the 119th United States Congress, New Jersey's 3rd congressional district is currently represented Herb Conaway (D, Delran Township). New Jersey is represented in the United States Senate by Democrats Cory Booker (Newark, term ends 2027) and Andy Kim (Moorestown, term ends 2031).

For the 2026–2027 session, the 8th legislative district of the New Jersey Legislature is represented in the New Jersey Senate by Latham Tiver (R, Southampton Township) and in the General Assembly by Anthony Angelozzi (D, Hammonton) and Andrea Katz (D, Chesterfield Township).

Burlington County is governed by a Board of County Commissioners comprised of five members who are chosen at-large in partisan elections to serve three-year terms of office on a staggered basis, with either one or two seats coming up for election each year; at an annual reorganization meeting, the board selects a director and deputy director from among its members to serve a one-year term. As of 2026, Burlington County's Commissioners are: Director Felicia Hopson (D, Willingboro Township, term as commissioner ends December 31, 2027; term as director ends 2026), Deputy Director Allison Eckel (D, Medford, term as commissioner ends 2028; term as deputy director ends 2026), Randy Brolo (D, Lumberton, 2026; elected to an unexpired term), Tyler Burrell (D, Delran Township, 2027) and Tom Pullion (D, Edgewater Park, 2026).

Burlington County's constitutional officers are Clerk Joanne Schwartz (D, Southampton Township, 2028), Sheriff James H. Kostoplis (D, Bordentown, 2028) and Surrogate Brian J. Carlin (D, Burlington Township, 2026).

=== Politics ===
United States presidential election results for Southampton Township 2024 2020 2016 2012 2008 2004
Year	Republican		Democratic		Third party(ies)	
Year	No.	%	No.	%	No.	%
2024	3,476	56.53%	2,614	42.51%	59	0.96%
2020	4,026	57.27%	2,937	41.78%	67	0.95%
2016	3,454	58.89%	2,217	37.80%	194	3.31%
2012	3,166	54.90%	2,547	44.17%	54	0.94%
2008	3,317	53.65%	2,791	45.14%	75	1.21%
2004	3,359	55.72%	2,613	43.35%	56	0.93%

As of March 2011, there were a total of 7,558 registered voters in Southampton Township, of which 1,879 (24.9% vs. 33.3% countywide) were registered as Democrats, 2,929 (38.8% vs. 23.9%) were registered as Republicans and 2,747 (36.3% vs. 42.8%) were registered as Unaffiliated. There were 3 voters registered as Libertarians or Greens. Among the township's 2010 Census population, 72.2% (vs. 61.7% in Burlington County) were registered to vote, including 85.6% of those ages 18 and over (vs. 80.3% countywide).

Gubernatorial election results for Southampton Township
Year	Republican		Democratic		Third party(ies)	
Year	No.	%	No.	%	No.	%
2025	3,039	56.08%	2,355	43.46%	25	0.46%
2021	2,907	61.42%	1,803	38.09%	23	0.49%
2017	2,146	60.84%	1,321	37.45%	60	1.70%
2013	2,998	78.61%	762	19.98%	54	1.42%
2009	2,500	58.55%	1,556	36.44%	214	5.01%
2005	2,129	54.35%	1,617	41.28%	171	4.37%

In the 2012 presidential election, Republican Mitt Romney received 3,166 votes here (54.5% vs. 40.2% countywide), ahead of Democrat Barack Obama with 2,547 votes (43.8% vs. 58.1%) and other candidates with 54 votes (0.9% vs. 1.0%), among the 5,814 ballots cast by the township's 7,758 registered voters, for a turnout of 74.9% (vs. 74.5% in Burlington County). In the 2008 presidential election, Republican John McCain received 3,317 votes here (53.2% vs. 39.9% countywide), ahead of Democrat Barack Obama with 2,791 votes (44.8% vs. 58.4%) and other candidates with 75 votes (1.2% vs. 1.0%), among the 6,233 ballots cast by the township's 7,815 registered voters, for a turnout of 79.8% (vs. 80.0% in Burlington County). In the 2004 presidential election, Republican George W. Bush received 3,359 votes here (55.3% vs. 46.0% countywide), ahead of Democrat John Kerry with 2,613 votes (43.0% vs. 52.9%) and other candidates with 56 votes (0.9% vs. 0.8%), among the 6,077 ballots cast by the township's 7,712 registered voters, for a turnout of 78.8% (vs. 78.8% in the whole county).

In the 2013 gubernatorial election, Republican Chris Christie received 2,998 votes here (77.2% vs. 61.4% countywide), ahead of Democrat Barbara Buono with 762 votes (19.6% vs. 35.8%) and other candidates with 54 votes (1.4% vs. 1.2%), among the 3,883 ballots cast by the township's 7,765 registered voters, yielding a 50.0% turnout (vs. 44.5% in the county). In the 2009 gubernatorial election, Republican Chris Christie received 2,500 votes here (58.0% vs. 47.7% countywide), ahead of Democrat Jon Corzine with 1,556 votes (36.1% vs. 44.5%), Independent Chris Daggett with 180 votes (4.2% vs. 4.8%) and other candidates with 34 votes (0.8% vs. 1.2%), among the 4,307 ballots cast by the township's 7,733 registered voters, yielding a 55.7% turnout (vs. 44.9% in the county).

United States Senate election results for Southampton Township1
Year	Republican		Democratic		Third party(ies)	
Year	No.	%	No.	%	No.	%
2024	3,167	53.23%	2,723	45.76%	60	1.01%
2018	3,099	60.03%	1,778	34.44%	285	5.52%
2012	3,020	55.33%	2,384	43.68%	54	0.99%
2006	2,149	56.29%	1,587	41.57%	82	2.15%

United States Senate election results for Southampton Township2
Year	Republican		Democratic		Third party(ies)	
Year	No.	%	No.	%	No.	%
2020	3,933	57.55%	2,820	41.26%	81	1.19%
2014	2,127	63.57%	1,167	34.88%	52	1.55%
2013	1,577	64.39%	845	34.50%	27	1.10%
2008	3,175	55.99%	2,426	42.78%	70	1.23%

== Education ==
The Southampton Township Schools serve public school students in kindergarten through eighth grade. As of the 2018–19 school year, the district, comprised of three schools, had an enrollment of 734 students and 70.5 classroom teachers (on an FTE basis), for a student–teacher ratio of 10.4:1. Schools in the district (with 2018–19 enrollment data from the National Center for Education Statistics) are Southampton School #1 with 234 students in grades K–2, Southampton School #2 with 230 students in grades 3–5 and Southampton School #3 with 254 students in grades 6–8.

Public school students from Southampton Township in ninth through twelfth grades attend Seneca High School, which also serves students in ninth through twelfth grade from Shamong Township, Tabernacle Township and Woodland Township. The school is part of the Lenape Regional High School District, which also serves students from Evesham Township, Medford Lakes, Medford and Mount Laurel. As of the 2018–19 school year, the high school had an enrollment of 1,137 students and 109.5 classroom teachers (on an FTE basis), for a student–teacher ratio of 10.4:1.

Students from Southampton Township, and from all of Burlington County, are eligible to attend the Burlington County Institute of Technology, a countywide public school district that serves the vocational and technical education needs of students at the high school and post-secondary level at its campuses in Medford and Westampton.

== Transportation ==
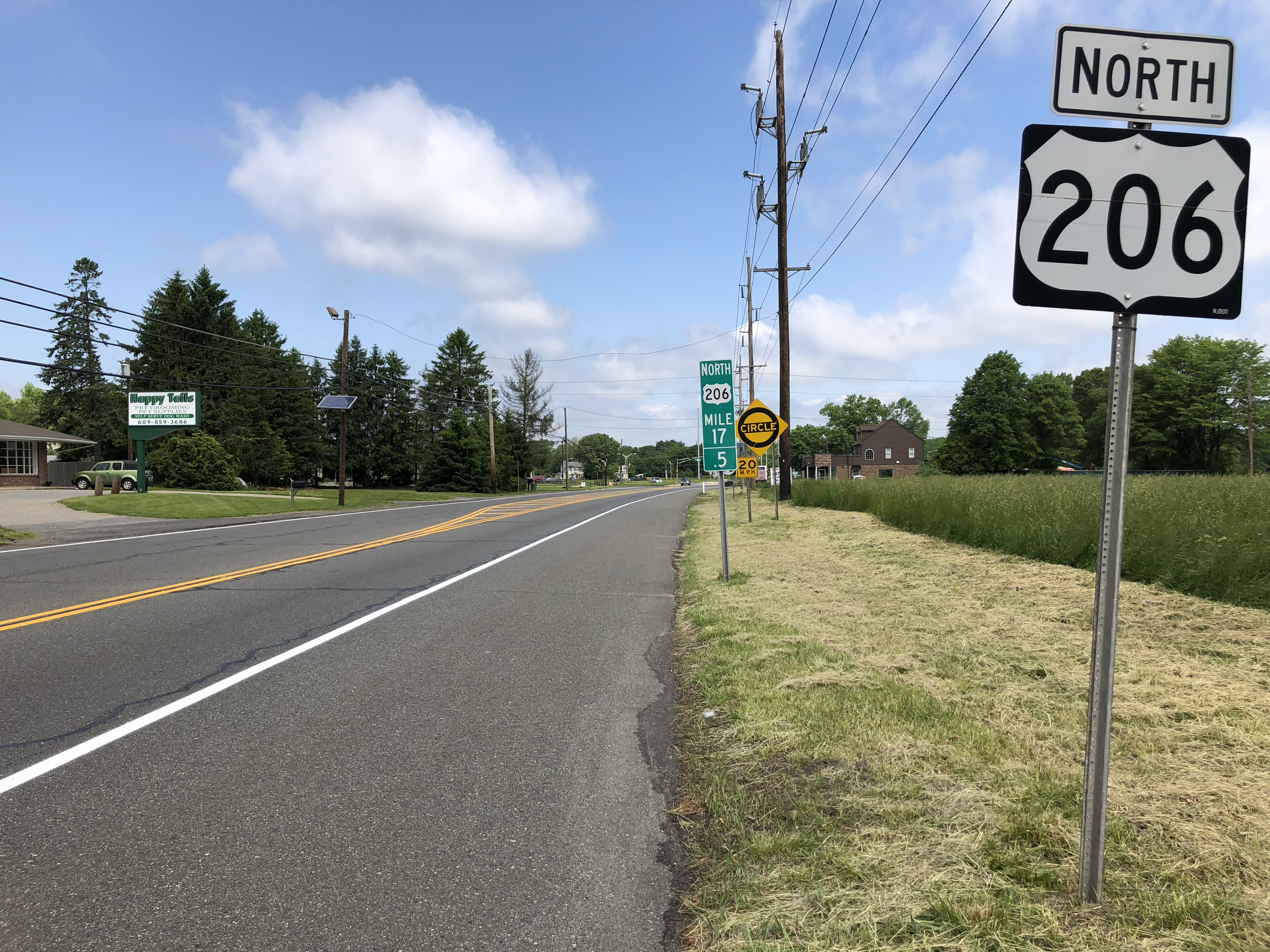
US 206 northbound in Southampton Township

=== Roads and highways ===
As of May 2010, the township had a total of 112.19 miles (180.55 km) of roadways, of which 74.37 miles (119.69 km) were maintained by the municipality, 19.38 miles (31.19 km) by Burlington County and 18.44 miles (29.68 km) by the New Jersey Department of Transportation.

The two main highways serving Southampton are US 206, which runs north–south, and Route 70, which is oriented east–west, which intersect at the Red Lion Circle. Route 38 and County Route 530 also cross the township.

=== Public transportation ===
NJ Transit provides bus service in the township on the 317 route between Asbury Park and Philadelphia.

== Wineries ==
- DeMastro Vineyards

== Notable people ==
People who were born in, residents of, or otherwise closely associated with Southampton Township include:

- Albert Cooper (1904–1993), soccer goalkeeper who earned two cap with the U.S. national team in 1928
- Kyle Criscuolo (born 1992), ice hockey forward who has played in the NHL for the Buffalo Sabres
- Nick Decker (born 1999), professional baseball outfielder
- Samuel A. Dobbins (1814–1905), represented New Jersey's 2nd congressional district in the United States House of Representatives from 1873 to 1877
- Brad Ecklund (1922–2010), center who played five seasons in the NFL
- Job H. Lippincott (1842–1900), United States Attorney for the District of New Jersey and Associate Justice of the New Jersey Supreme Court from 1893 to 1900
- Chauncey Morehouse (1902–1980), jazz drummer
- Jim Saxton (born 1943), Congressman who served from 1984 to 2009
