= Southampton Township Schools =

School district in Burlington County, New Jersey, US

Address
- 177 Main Street Southampton Township, Burlington County, New Jersey, 08088; United States
- Coordinates: 39.933025°N 74.746429°W

District information
- Grades: K-8
- Superintendent: Michael L. Harris
- Business administrator: Casey DeJoseph
- Schools: 3

Students and staff
- Enrollment: 734 (as of 2018–19)
- Faculty: 70.5 FTEs
- Student–teacher ratio: 10.4:1

Other information
- District Factor Group: GH
- Website: www.southampton.k12.nj.us
Ind.	Per pupil	District spending	Rank (*)	K-8 average	%± vs. average
1A	Total Spending	$19,535	46	$18,891	3.4%
1	Budgetary Cost	15,348	41	14,159	8.4%
2	Classroom Instruction	9,616	48	8,659	11.1%
6	Support Services	2,275	35	2,167	5.0%
8	Administrative Cost	1,767	39	1,547	14.2%
10	Operations & Maintenance	1,514	27	1,612	−6.1%
13	Extracurricular Activities	175	46	104	68.3%
16	Median Teacher Salary	55,150	14	61,136
Data from NJDoE 2014 Taxpayers' Guide to Education Spending. *Of K-8 districts with 401-750 students. Lowest spending=1; Highest=64

The Southampton Township Schools are a community public school district that serves students in Kindergarten through eighth grade from Southampton Township, in the U.S. state of New Jersey.

As of the 2018–19 school year, the district, comprising three schools, had an enrollment of 734 students and 70.5 classroom teachers (on an FTE basis), for a student–teacher ratio of 10.4:1.

The district is classified by the New Jersey Department of Education as being in District Factor Group "GH", the third-highest of eight groupings. District Factor Groups organize districts statewide to allow comparison by common socioeconomic characteristics of the local districts. From lowest socioeconomic status to highest, the categories are A, B, CD, DE, FG, GH, I and J.

Public school students from Southampton Township in ninth through twelfth grades attend Seneca High School, which also serves students in ninth through twelfth grade from Shamong Township, Tabernacle Township and Woodland Township. The school is part of the Lenape Regional High School District, which also serves students from Evesham Township, Medford Lakes, Medford Township and Mount Laurel Township. As of the 2018–19 school year, the high school had an enrollment of 1,137 students and 109.5 classroom teachers (on an FTE basis), for a student–teacher ratio of 10.4:1.

== Schools ==
Schools in the district (with 2018–19 enrollment data from the National Center for Education Statistics) are:

Elementary schools

- Southampton School #1 with 234 students in grades K-2
  - Brianna L. Chapin, principal
- Southampton School #2 with 230 students in grades 3-5
  - Jennifer L. Horner, principal

Middle school

- Southampton School #3 with 254 students in grades 6-8
  - Jennifer L. Horner, principal

== Administration ==
Core members of the district's administration are:

- Michael L. Harris, superintendent
- Casey DeJoseph, business administrator and board secretary

== Board of education ==
The district's board of education, composed of nine members, sets policy and oversees the fiscal and educational operation of the district through its administration. As a Type II school district, the board's trustees are elected directly by voters to serve three-year terms of office on a staggered basis, with three seats up for election each year held (since 2012) as part of the November general election. The board appoints a superintendent to oversee the district's day-to-day operations and a business administrator to supervise the business functions of the district.
