= Atwood House =

Atwood House or Attwood House may refer to:

in the United States

(by state then city)

- Attwood-Hopson House, New Edinburg, AR, listed on the NRHP in Arkansas
- Barnett-Attwood House, New Edinburg, AR, listed on the NRHP in Arkansas
- Ephraim Atwood House, Cambridge, MA, listed on the NRHP in Massachusetts
- Charles R. Atwood House, Taunton, MA, listed on the NRHP in Massachusetts
- Thomas Atwood House, Wellfleet, MA, listed on the NRHP in Massachusetts
- Demarest–Atwood House, Cresskill, NJ, listed on the NRHP in New Jersey
- E. K. Atwood House, Ennis, TX, listed on the NRHP in Texas
- Matthews-Atwood House, Ennis, TX, listed on the NRHP in Texas
