= Cleveland County Courthouse =

Cleveland County Courthouse may refer to:

- Cleveland County Courthouse (Arkansas), Rison, Arkansas
- Cleveland County Courthouse (North Carolina), Shelby, North Carolina
- Cleveland County Courthouse (Oklahoma), Norman, Oklahoma, listed on the National Register of Historic Places
