= ShopWorn (e-commerce site) =

E-commerce platform

ShopWorn is a platform based in the United States offering luxury consumer goods from 'unsold and past season's inventory'.

== History and Reception ==
The platform was founded in November 2015 by Larry and Richard Birnbaum, who had been dealing with garment trade and used watches at EBay since 1998. Initially they used to sell knitted clothing manufactured by the hubs at Manhattan and Argentina and finally used to sell Ralph Lauren and Tommy Hilfiger branded garments. Fortune, covered the venture of Birnbaum brothers in the report “Going Pro on eBay”. In 2015, ShopWorn started its operation with its sole warehouse at Cresskill. In October 2020, ShopWorn started its operation in Asia-Pacific Region, as it opens its office in Hong Kong. In December 2020, Frank Crisci, the former VC of Neiman Marcus was recruited as the user experience advisor at ShopWorn. In March 2021, former GM of Google Hong Kong and former VC of Yahoo Asia, Philip Chan was appointed as the MD of ShopWorn Asia.

Shopworn provides consumer goods that are said to be not pre-owned, rather are said to be from the 'unsold stock' or collected from the 'leftover inventory' from the 'authorized retailers'. Luxury Daily reported that the concept of 'not new, not pre-owned' was utilized by ShopWorn with success whereas Women's Wear Daily expressed the concern that ShopWorn would face difficulty to compete with typical luxury retailers. The model of functioning of ShowWorn has been said to address the 'inventory problem' faced by the brand where a indecisiveness prevails with the unsold stock at the end of every season. Such practices has also been said to be environmentally friendly and sustainable. The New York Times analyzed and predicted the cultural differences between the people of The US and Europe and Asia as the reason for the acceptability of the concept of the ShopWorn. Watch specialist Robert Farago in November 2020 described ShopWorn as a platform "new to the field of “gray market” (new-in-box) timepieces.....Shopworn is selling “unofficial” gray market watches at the same discounts" but later recanted his words explaining "They’re anti-gray market. The distinction requires explanation.. Shopworn doesn’t sell pre-owned watches....While the imported watches are new-in-box they’re not sold as new. That’s because the watch may have been displayed/handled in the shop. Hence the term “shop worn.”".
