= Magnolia Petroleum Building =

Magnolia Petroleum Building may refer to one of the following buildings:

- Magnolia Hotel (Dallas, Texas)
- Magnolia Petroleum Building (Oklahoma City), Oklahoma
- Magnolia Petroleum Company Filling Station, Kingsland, Arkansas
