= Building at 104–106 Hancock Street =

Historic house in Massachusetts, United States

- U.S. National Register of Historic Places
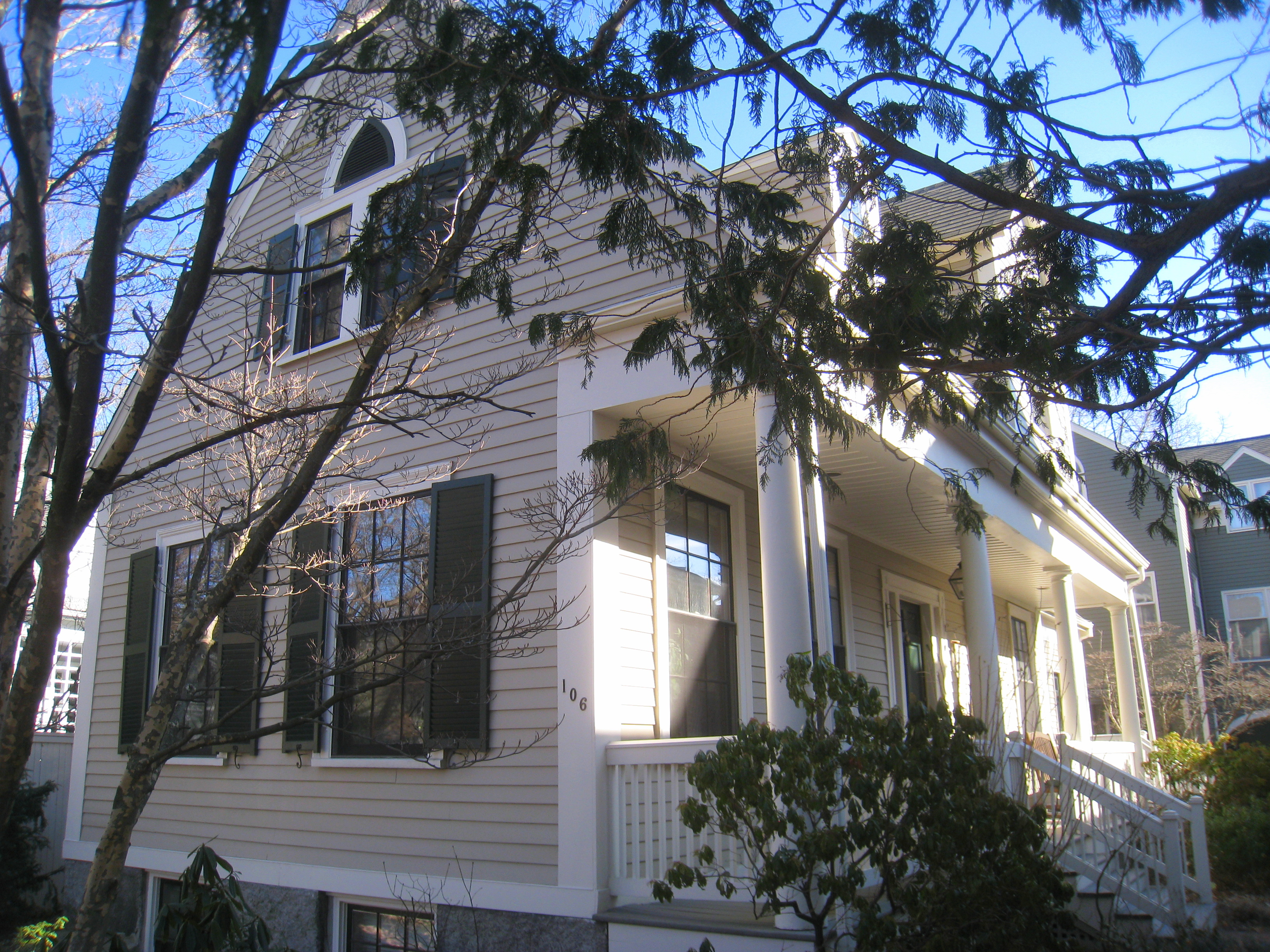

- Location within Massachusetts Location within the United States
- Location: 104–106 Hancock St., Cambridge, Massachusetts
- Coordinates: 42°22′08.8″N 71°06′27.5″W
- Area: less than one acre
- Built: 1839
- Architectural style: Greek Revival, Gothic Revival
- MPS: Cambridge MRA
- NRHP reference No.: 83000789
- Added to NRHP: June 30, 1983

The Building at 104–106 Hancock Street is an historic cottage in Cambridge, Massachusetts. Built in 1839, it is a significant local example of transitional Greek Revival/Gothic Revival architecture, and one of the earliest houses built after the subdivision of Dana Hill. It was listed on the National Register of Historic Places in 1983.

== Description and history ==
104–106 Hancock Street stands in the Dana Hill area of Cambridge, between Central Square and Harvard Square north of Massachusetts Avenue. It is set on the east side of Harvard Street, nearly opposite its junction with Centre Street, and is oriented facing south. It is a 1 1/2-story wood-frame structure, with a gabled roof and clapboarded exterior. The roof extends over a shallow front porch for its full five-bay width, supported by Doric columns. The main entrance is at the center of the main block, which is extended to the east by an enclosed porch.

The area was historically the estate of jurist Francis Dana, which was divided among his heirs after his death. The main mansion was sold out of the family at that time, and burned down in 1839, spurring family members to sell buildable lots from their holdings. This house and the nearly identical house next door were both built in 1839. They exhibit fairly typical modest Greek Revival elements, but also include early examples of Gothic detailing in an applied-wood Gothic arch over the windows in the street-facing gable end. This house underwent a number of alterations between its construction and the 1940s; these have been reversed in a historically sensitive rehabilitation.

== See also ==
- National Register of Historic Places listings in Cambridge, Massachusetts
