= Old U.S. Route 79 (Kingsland, Arkansas) =

- Old US 79, Kingsland Segment
- U.S. National Register of Historic Places
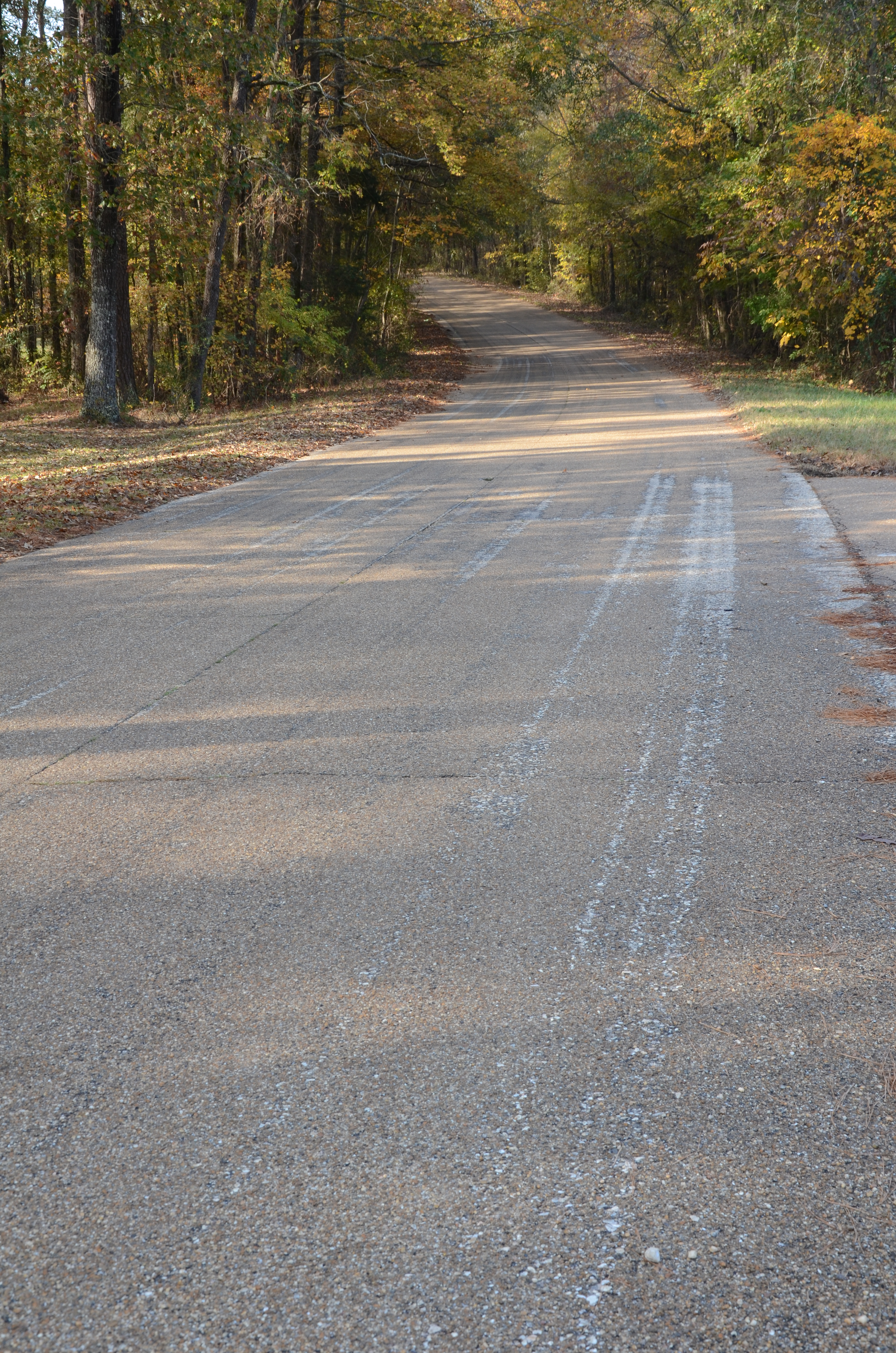

- Location within Arkansas Location within the United States
- Location: Cty.Rd. 22 between US 79 & Kight Rd., Kingsland, Arkansas
- Coordinates: 33.86112°N 92.30614°W
- Area: 1.3 acres (0.53 ha)
- Built: 1938
- Built by: Dixon, S.M.; Hill, D.B.
- Architectural style: Highway
- MPS: Arkansas Highway History and Architecture MPS
- NRHP reference No.: 05001067
- Added to NRHP: September 28, 2005

Old US 79, Kingsland Segment is a rare drivable section of concrete highway built in 1938 near Kingsland, Arkansas. It is also one of a few surviving sections of the original alignment of U.S. Route 79 (U.S. 79) in Arkansas. The road that became US 79 had been laid out by 1916, and was paved with asphalt in 1930. In the mid-1930s, the state embarked on a program of removing dangerous grade crossings where major routes crossed railroad tracks. In 1938, it awarded a contract to S. M. Dixon to build an overpass at the crossing of US 79 and the St. Louis Southwestern Railway line. Dixon built a 655-metre-long (2,149 ft) section of concrete roadway, 22 feet (6.7 m) wide, with a concrete deck girder bridge to cross the tracks. This section of US 79 remained in service until 1954, when the current alignment to its northeast was built. It has since been designated County Road 22. The concrete is in good condition; it has been covered in chip seal for about half its length.

The highway segment was listed on the National Register of Historic Places in 2005.

== See also ==
- National Register of Historic Places listings in Cleveland County, Arkansas
