= Mount Olivet Methodist Church =

Historic church in Arkansas, United States

- U.S. National Register of Historic Places
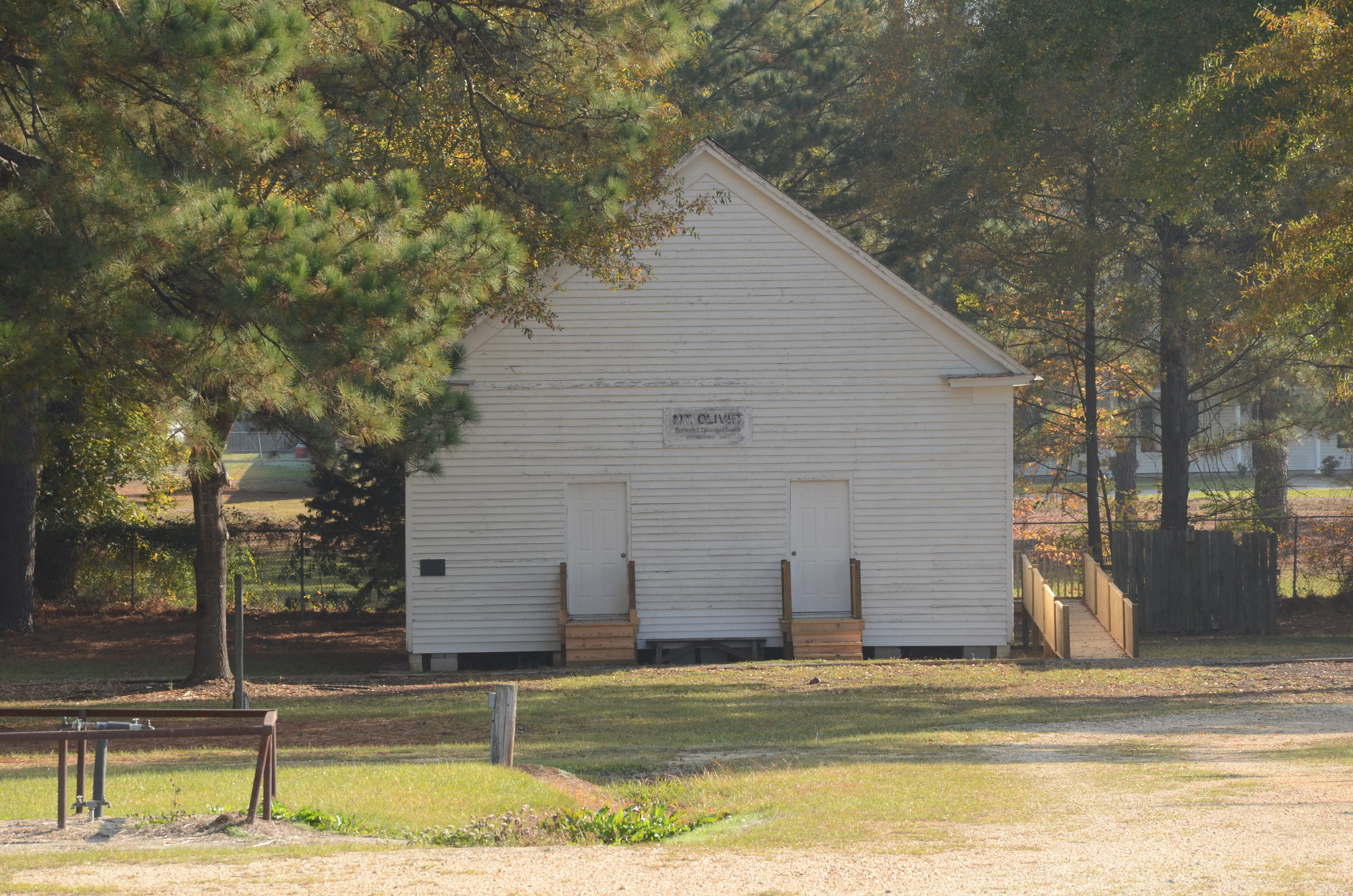

- Location within Arkansas Location within the United States
- Location: Fairgrounds off AR 35, Rison, Arkansas
- Coordinates: 33°57′13″N 92°11′30″W
- Area: less than one acre
- Built: 1867
- NRHP reference No.: 75000377
- Added to NRHP: December 1, 1975

The Mount Olivet Methodist Church is a historic church building located on the Cleveland County, Arkansas fairgrounds near Rison, Arkansas. It is a simple rectangular structure built c. 1875, with twin entrances on one of the gable ends. The long sides of the church have four windows, while the rear wall has two, and the exterior has minimal decoration. The interior is a single chamber, again with minimal styling. The church was rescued from demolition in 1975 by the Cleveland County Historical Society, which moved it to the fairgrounds to be part of a display recreating a 19th-century Arkansas village.

The church building was listed on the National Register of Historic Places in 1975. It is believed to be the oldest Methodist church building in the county, and is one of its oldest structures.

== See also ==
- Cleveland County Clerk's Building, also part of the fairgrounds display
- National Register of Historic Places listings in Cleveland County, Arkansas
