= Peter Huyler House =

Historic house in New Jersey, United States

- U.S. National Register of Historic Places
- New Jersey Register of Historic Places
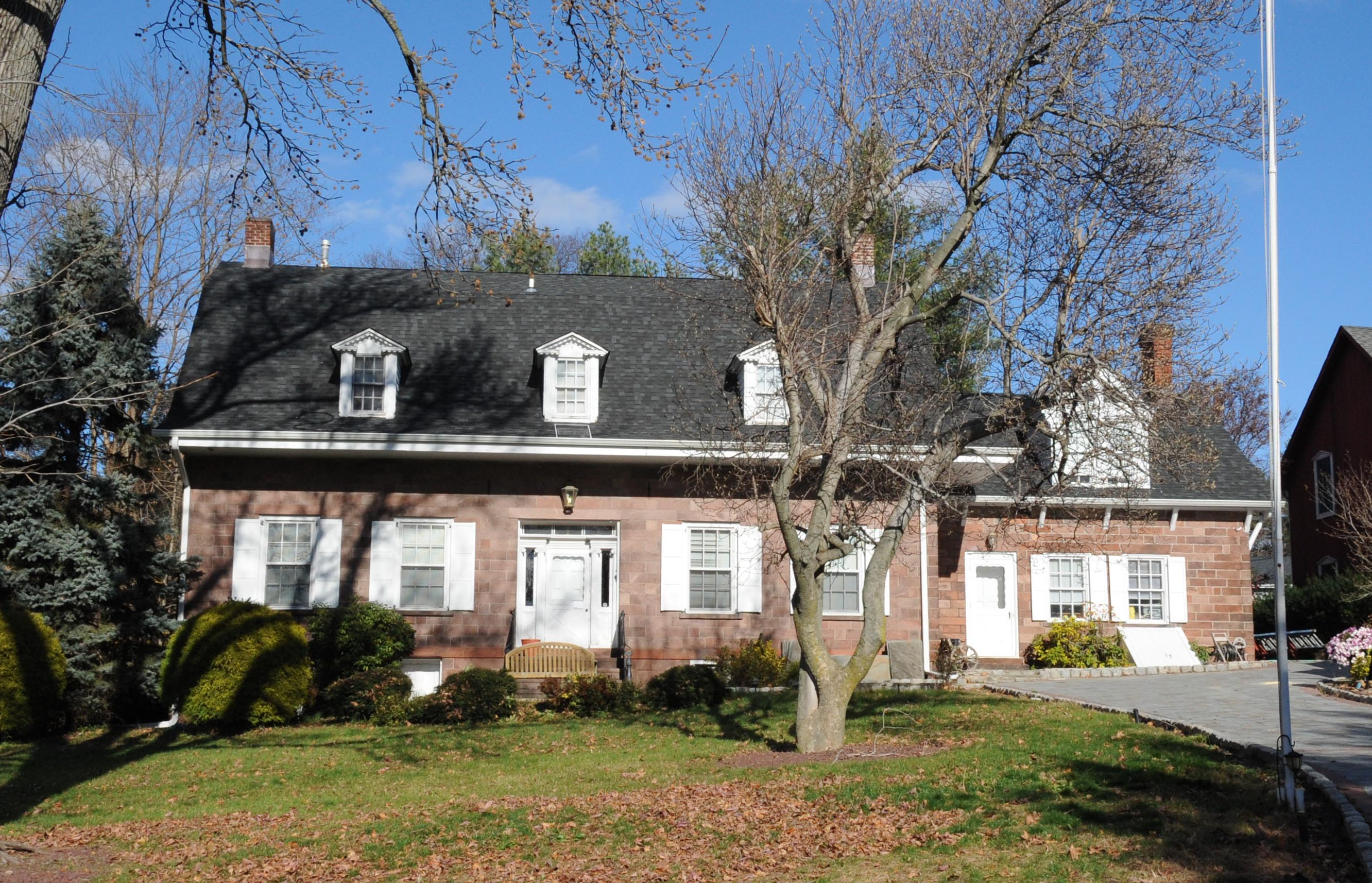
- (2015)

- Location within Bergen County, New Jersey Location within New Jersey Location within the United States
- Location: 50 County Road, Cresskill, New Jersey
- Coordinates: 40°56′10″N 73°57′23″W
- Area: 2.1 acres (0.85 ha)
- Built: 1836
- MPS: Stone Houses of Bergen County TR
- NRHP reference No.: 83001528
- NJRHP No.: 450

Significant dates
- Added to NRHP: January 9, 1983
- Designated NJRHP: October 3, 1980

The Peter Huyler House is located on what is known as the Captain John Huyler Homestead at 50 County Road between Palisades Avenue and Crest Drive North in Cresskill, Bergen County, New Jersey. In 1776, the property was part of a 180-acre (73 ha) farm which belonged to Loyalist John Ackerson or Eckerson. It was confiscated in 1779 because of Ackerson's loyalty to the British, and sold in 1784 to Captain John Huyler of the local militia. Huyler's son Peter built the main wing of the current house in 1836, according to the date stone over the door, with what was described by the Bergen County Stone House Survey as "some of the finest stonework in Bergen County". The outbuilding was most probably a summer kitchen, with quarters for slaves.

Records show that by 1876, the site was owned by George Huyler, and in 1912 by his estate.

The house was added to the New Jersey Register of Historic Places in 1980, and to the National Register of Historic Places in 1983.

== See also ==
- National Register of Historic Places listings in Bergen County, New Jersey
