= National Register of Historic Places listings in Cleveland County, Arkansas =

Location of Cleveland County in Arkansas

This is a list of the National Register of Historic Places listings in Cleveland County, Arkansas.

This is intended to be a complete list of the properties and districts on the National Register of Historic Places in Cleveland County, Arkansas, United States. The locations of National Register properties and districts for which the latitude and longitude coordinates are included below, may be seen in a map.

There are 14 properties and districts listed on the National Register in the county, including 1 National Historic Landmark. Another four properties were once listed but were removed.

Contents: Counties in Arkansas
- Arkansas
- Ashley
- Baxter
- Benton
- Boone
- Bradley
- Calhoun
- Carroll
- Chicot
- Clark
- Clay
- Cleburne
- Cleveland
- Columbia
- Conway
- Craighead
- Crawford
- Crittenden
- Cross
- Dallas
- Desha
- Drew
- Faulkner
- Franklin
- Fulton
- Garland
- Grant
- Greene
- Hempstead
- Hot Spring
- Howard
- Independence
- Izard
- Jackson
- Jefferson
- Johnson
- Lafayette
- Lawrence
- Lee
- Lincoln
- Little River
- Logan
- Lonoke
- Madison
- Marion
- Miller
- Mississippi
- Monroe
- Montgomery
- Nevada
- Newton
- Ouachita
- Perry
- Phillips
- Pike
- Poinsett
- Polk
- Pope
- Prairie
- Pulaski (Little Rock)
- Randolph
- St. Francis
- Saline
- Scott
- Searcy
- Sebastian
- Sevier
- Sharp
- Stone
- Union
- Van Buren
- Washington
- White
- Woodruff
- Yell

This National Park Service list is complete through NPS recent listings posted December 19, 2025.

== Current listings ==
	Name on the Register	Image	Date listed	Location	City or town	Description
1	Attwood-Hopson House	Attwood-Hopson House	August 16, 1994 (#94000848)	Northern side of Highway 8; 33°45′35″N 92°14′27″W	New Edinburg	
2	Barnett-Attwood House	Barnett-Attwood House	July 29, 1977 (#77000247)	Northeast of New Edinburg; 33°46′50″N 92°13′07″W	New Edinburg	
3	Cherry Cemetery		September 5, 2024 (#100010830)	East side of Mt. Elba Road. approximately 0.5 miles (0.80 km) south of Mt. Elba cutoff 33°53′01″N 92°09′29″W	Rison	
4	Cleveland County Clerk's Building	Cleveland County Clerk's Building	January 31, 1976 (#76000394)	Fairgrounds; 33°57′12″N 92°11′30″W	Rison	
5	Cleveland County Courthouse	Cleveland County Courthouse	April 11, 1977 (#77000248)	Main and Magnolia; 33°57′33″N 92°11′04″W	Rison	
6	Magnolia Petroleum Company Filling Station		January 24, 2019 (#100003325)	SW of intersection of Larch & 1st Sts. 33°51′32″N 92°17′44″W	Kingsland	
7	Marks' Mills Battlefield Park	Marks' Mills Battlefield Park	January 21, 1970 (#70000119)	Junction of Highways 8 and 97; 33°47′00″N 92°15′12″W	Fordyce	Site of the Battle of Marks' Mills; one of the Camden Expedition Sites, a National Historic Landmark consisting of sites in several counties
8	Mount Olivet Methodist Church	Mount Olivet Methodist Church	December 1, 1975 (#75000377)	Fairgrounds off Highway 35; 33°57′13″N 92°11′30″W	Rison	
9	New Edinburg Commercial Historic District	New Edinburg Commercial Historic District	October 22, 2001 (#01001118)	Highway 8; 33°45′31″N 92°14′24″W	New Edinburg	
10	Old US 79, Kingsland Segment	Old US 79, Kingsland Segment	September 28, 2005 (#05001067)	County Road 22 between U.S. Route 79 and Kight Rd. 33°51′46″N 92°18′23″W	Kingsland	
11	Rison Cities Service Station	Rison Cities Service Station	May 10, 2001 (#01000486)	308 Main St. 33°57′31″N 92°11′24″W	Rison	
12	Rison Overpass		May 13, 2021 (#100006533)	AR 35 (Magnolia St.) over the Union Pacific RR. 33°57′20″N 92°11′46″W	Rison	
13	Rison Texaco Service Station	Rison Texaco Service Station	March 25, 2002 (#01001243)	216 Main St. 33°57′34″N 92°11′26″W	Rison	
14	Wesley Chapel	Wesley Chapel	December 7, 1995 (#95001412)	Highway 15; 34°00′12″N 92°02′27″W	Woodlawn	

== Former listing ==
	Name on the Register	Image	Date listed	Date removed	Location	City or town	Description
1	Federal Building		July 21, 2000 (#00000752)	June 1, 2005	20 Magnolia St.	Rison	
2	Hall Morgan Post 83, American Legion Hut		May 19, 2003 (#03000399)	September 18, 2013	208 Sycamore St. 33°57′30″N 92°11′18″W	Rison	
3	Mount Carmel Methodist Church		October 4, 1984 (#84000004)	June 3, 1986	N of Rison off US 79	Rison vicinity	
4	Phoenix Hotel		October 4, 2002 (#02001071)	January 2, 2024	108 Main St. 33°57′36″N 92°11′27″W	Rison	

== See also ==
- List of National Historic Landmarks in Arkansas
- National Register of Historic Places listings in Arkansas
