= Cleveland County Clerk's Building =

Historic building in Rison, Arkansas

- U.S. National Register of Historic Places
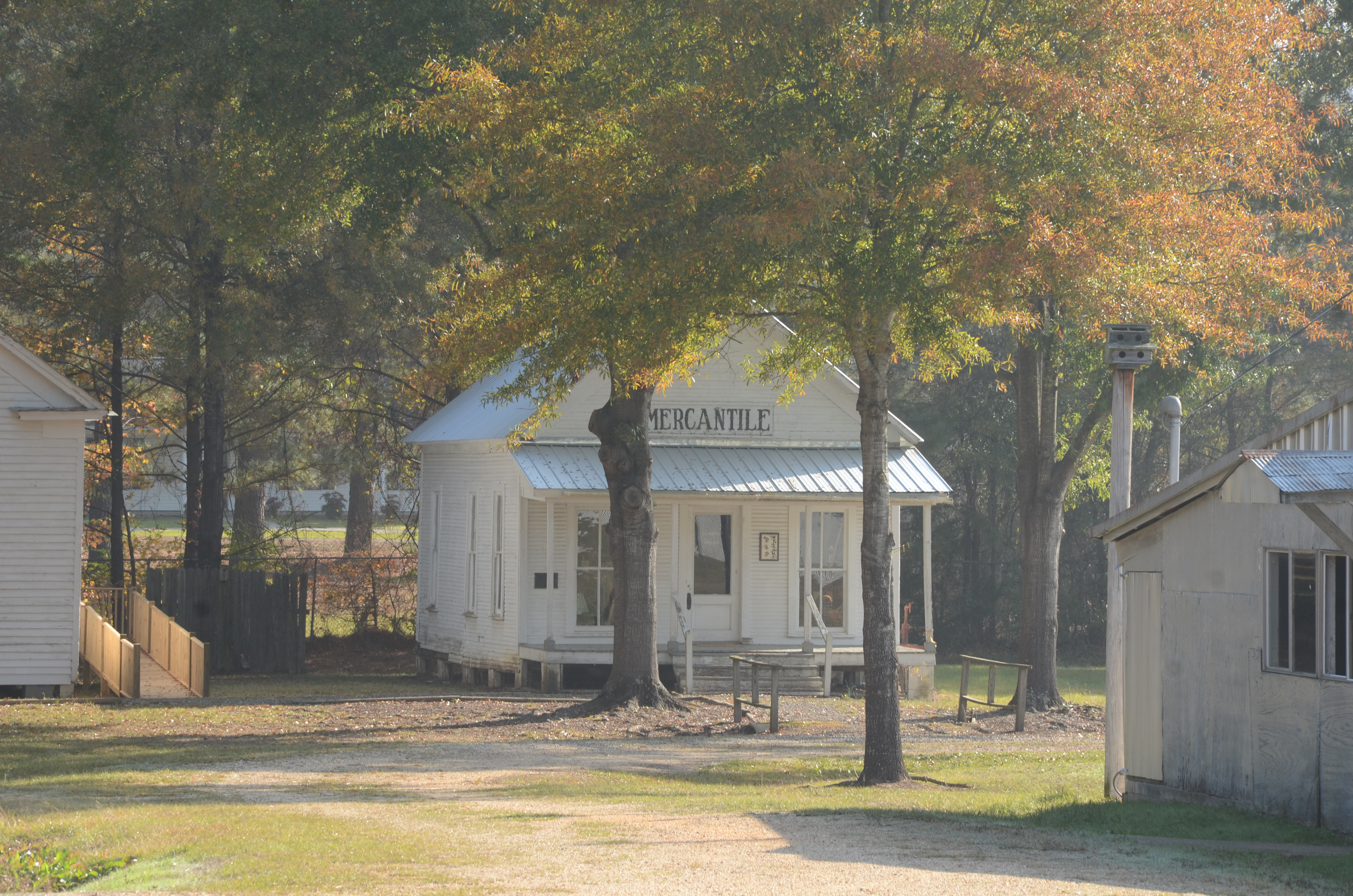

- Location within Arkansas Location within the United States
- Location: Fairgrounds, Rison, Arkansas
- Coordinates: 33°57′12″N 92°11′30″W
- Area: less than one acre
- Built: 1902
- NRHP reference No.: 76000394
- Added to NRHP: January 31, 1976

The Cleveland County Clerk's Building is a modest one-story wood-frame structure now located on the Cleveland County fairgrounds in Rison, Arkansas. Measuring 20 feet (6.1 m) wide and 32 feet (9.8 m) long, it was built in 1902 at a location near the present site of the county courthouse. It served as the office of the county clerk until about 1911, when the courthouse was completed. It was then rented to the local sheriff for personal use, and from 1921 to 1940 housed an office of the local agricultural extension service.

In 1941 the building was moved to a site in Rison's business district. It was used for a variety of commercial and professional purposes until 1975, when the Cleveland County Historical Society had the building moved to the fairgrounds. There it serves as one of a collection of historic structures intended to depict a typical 19th-century Arkansas village.

The building was listed on the National Register of Historic Places in 1976.

== See also ==
- Mount Olivet Methodist Church, also part of the fairgrounds village collection
- National Register of Historic Places listings in Cleveland County, Arkansas
