= Stephen Dadaian =

Armenian guitarist (born 1987)

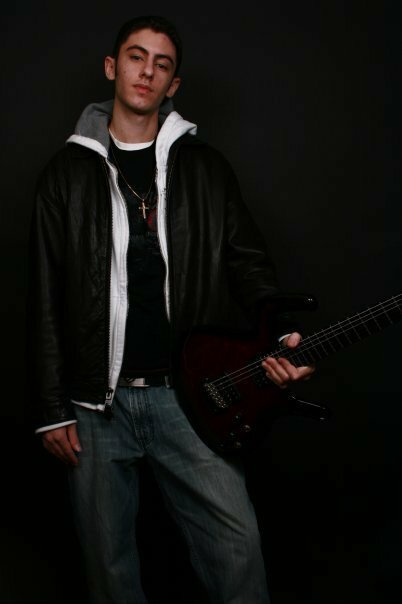

Background information
- Born: Stephen Charles Dadaian; May 3, 1987 (age 38)
- Origin: Cresskill, New Jersey, U.S.
- Genres: Rock, classical, progressive rock, heavy metal, progressive metal
- Occupation: Guitarist
- Years active: 2005–present

Stephen Charles Dadaian (born May 3, 1987) is an Armenian electric and classical guitarist from Cresskill, New Jersey. He is also a general dentist. He attended Cresskill High School, where he graduated in 2005 and later graduated from The College of New Jersey in 2009. He graduated and earned his DDS degree from Columbia University College of Dental Medicine in 2013, where he was part of The William Jarvie Research Society.

Dadaian began playing electric guitar at the age of 14 then classical thereafter at the age of 16. In his teenage years, Dadaian studied with electric guitarists such as Ron Thal and classical guitarists Antigoni Goni as well as Jorge Caballero. In 2008 and 2009 he was a top prize earner in the Philadelphia Guitar Society Competition – Collegiate Division. During this time, he won first prize in Music Nation's "Slash's Ultimate Guitar Showdown", a national guitar competition with 2,500 entrants. The grand prize was chosen by Slash. Stephen was a top prize earner in Guitar World's "Shred the Web" competition. He has also opened for notable acts such as Third Eye Blind at The College of New Jersey in 2008, which was one of the largest turnouts seen at the College in the past five years.

In 2013, Stephen won a national guitar competition hosted by Jammit and judged by Dean guitars in addition to a representative of Pantera. Jammit allowed contestants to play a note for note cover or create their own rendition for the Pantera song "Drag the Waters", where Stephen performed the latter. The rhythm guitar was the same as the studio recording while the solos consisted of a mixture of his lead style with the style of Dimebag Darrell. It also made use of the features on his signature model guitar by Jason Lee guitars such as the arcade style killswitch button and the 27 fret fretboard. The judging for the contest was unanimous in Stephen's favor.

In 2014 he was selected as a finalist and won the Jon Donais Guitar Battle Royale, which was judged by Jon himself. Other accolades include an invitation to perform at the Guitar Gods festival with the likes of Yngwie Malmsteen, Steve Vai, and Nick McBrain as well as a top nomination by a guitar competition hosted by Rolling Stone.

Dadaian released his debut solo album "Follow the Light" in 2019, which was an instrumental concept album. The record received positive reviews and the title track was premiered with Guitar World where Dadaian is a contributing guest artist.

== Equipment ==
ESP Guitars M-II and M-III Models
Dunlop Crybaby Wah Pedal
Dunlop Jazz III Picks
Ibanez Tube Screamer
Mesa Boogie Dual Rectifier 100 W 3 Channel
Mesa Boogie Mark IV
Mesa Boogie 4 x 12, 2, x 12
