= Magnolia Company Filling Station =

- U.S. National Register of Historic Places
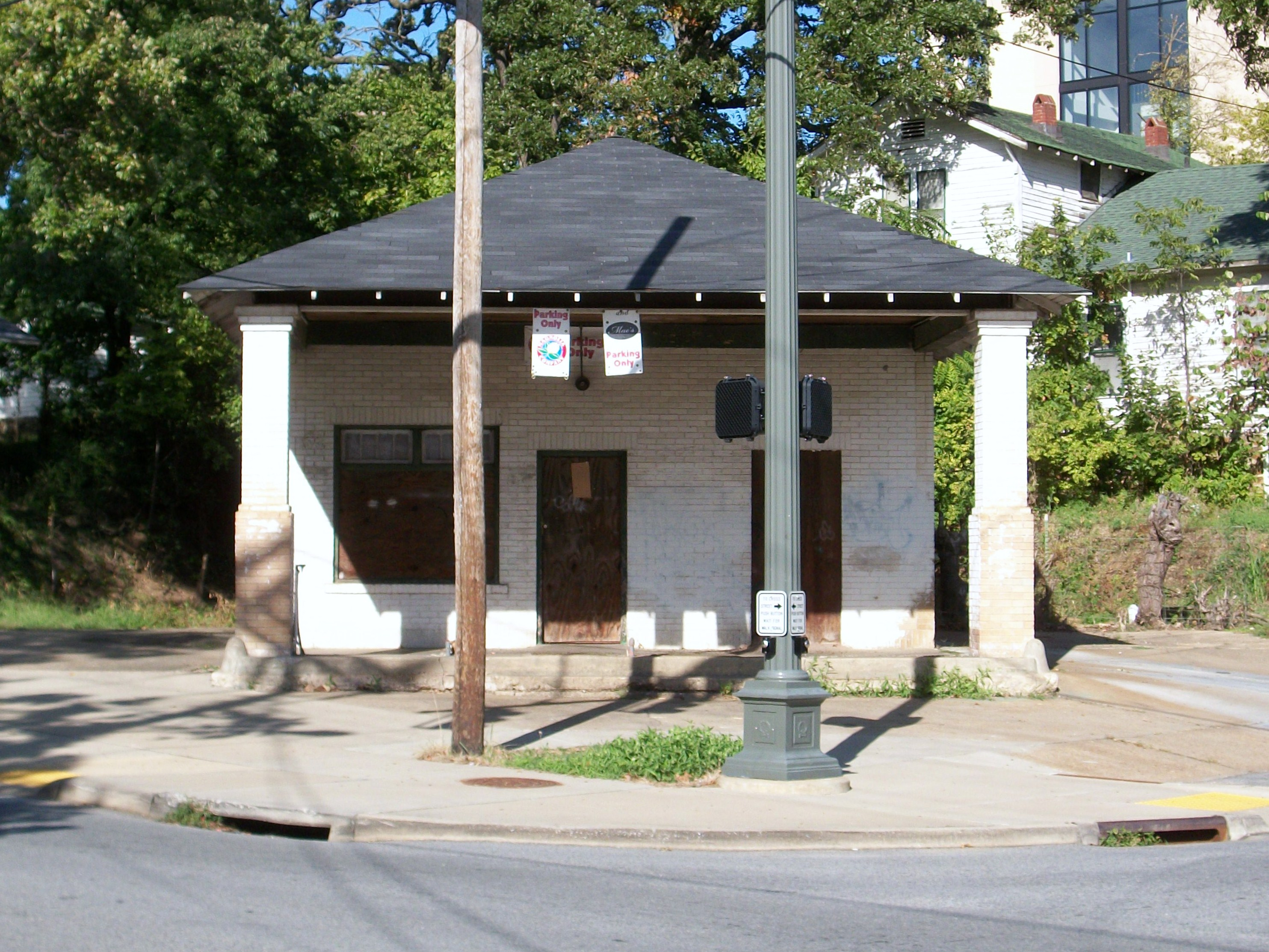

- Location within Arkansas Location within the United States
- Location: 492 W. Lafayette St., Fayetteville, Arkansas
- Coordinates: 36°4′7″N 94°9′54″W
- Area: less than one acre
- Built: 1925
- Built by: Earl Bird
- NRHP reference No.: 78000636
- Added to NRHP: November 15, 1978

The Magnolia Company Filling Station is a historic automotive service station building at 492 West Lafayette Street in Fayetteville, Arkansas. It is a small single-story white hip-roofed brick building, with a portico, supported by brick piers, extending over the area where the fuel pumps were originally located. The building has a center entrance, with a single sash window to the left, and a large window (formerly a doorway) to the right. Built in 1925, it is one of the region's oldest surviving gas stations, and, according to its National Register nomination in 1978 was the only one then known to have been built by the Magnolia Company and to still be surviving.

The building was listed on the National Register of Historic Places in 1978.

At least two other filling stations built by or for the company were surviving, however. A similarly named filling station in Kingsland, Arkansas, in south-central Arkansas, was listed on the National Register in 2019 as the Magnolia Petroleum Company Filling Station. It was built to a Magnolia Petroleum Company design which included elements of Craftsman and Tudor Revival architecture, and which was used as the design for at least one other filling station, in North Little Rock, which was destroyed after a fire in 2018.

== See also ==
- List of historic filling stations in Arkansas
- National Register of Historic Places listings in Washington County, Arkansas
