= Wesley Chapel (Woodlawn, Arkansas) =

Historic church in Arkansas, United States

- U.S. National Register of Historic Places
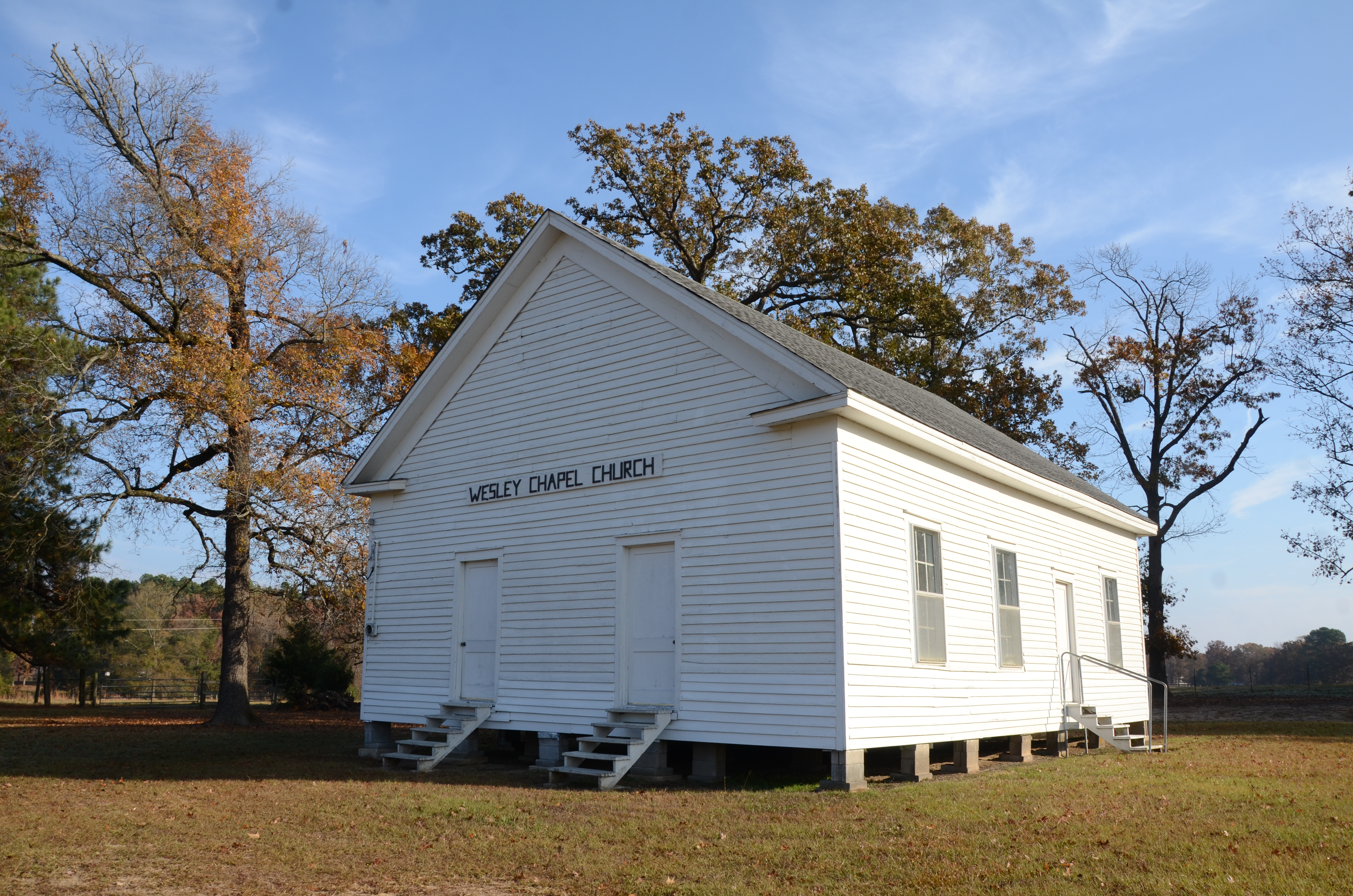

- Location within Arkansas Location within the United States
- Location: AR 15, Woodlawn, Cleveland County, Arkansas
- Coordinates: 34°0′12″N 92°2′27″W
- Area: 3 acres (1.2 ha)
- Built: 1872
- Built by: Norton, John J.; Jackson, W.D., et al.
- Architectural style: Greek Revival
- NRHP reference No.: 95001412
- Added to NRHP: December 7, 1995

Wesley Chapel is a historic church building on Arkansas Highway 15 in Woodlawn, Cleveland County, Arkansas. It is a simple one story wood-frame building constructed by local men in c. 1872. It has a pair of entrances on the west side and another toward the eastern end of the south face. The east elevation has two windows, the north one four, with the south elevation substituting the door for one of the windows. The building has minimal Greek Revival styling. The building rests on concrete blocks, a replacement in the 1950s for wooden blocks on which it was originally built. The only other significant alteration is the replacement of the original wood shingle roof with asphalt shingles. The church had an active congregation until the 1960s, and has since come into the hands of local preservationists.

The building was listed on the National Register of Historic Places in 1995.

== See also ==
- National Register of Historic Places listings in Cleveland County, Arkansas
