= Blackledge-Gair House =

Historic house in New Jersey, US

- U.S. National Register of Historic Places
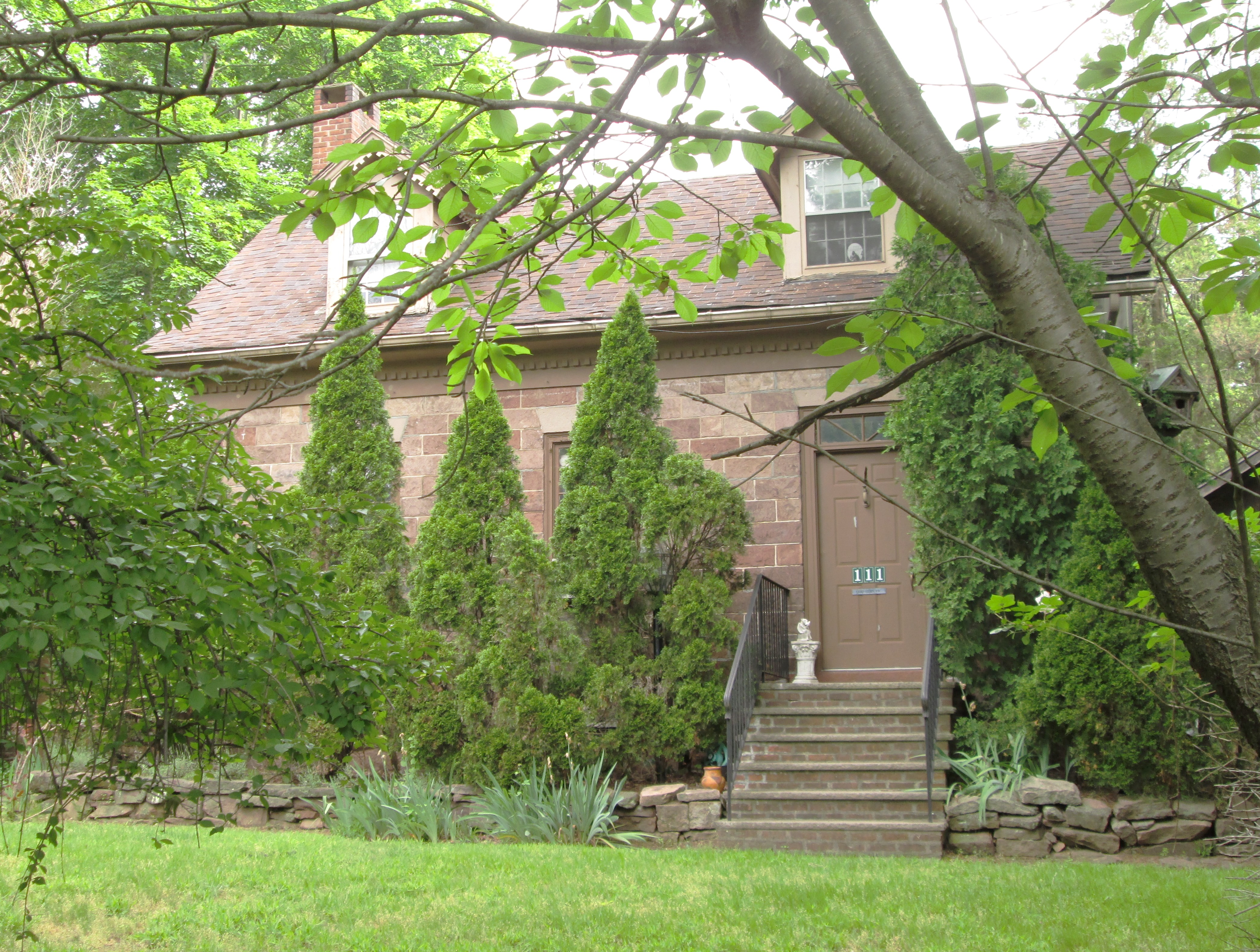
- (2016)

- Location within Bergen County, New Jersey Location within New Jersey Location within the United States
- Location: 111 Madison Avenue; Cresskill, New Jersey
- Coordinates: 40°56′31″N 73°58′04″W
- Built: not listed
- Architect: not listed
- Architectural style: not listed
- MPS: Old Stone Houses of Bergen County
- NRHP reference No.: 83001469
- Added to NRHP: January 9, 1983

The Blackledge-Gair House at 111 Madison Avenue between Brookside Avenue and Waverly Place in Cresskill, New Jersey is one of the Early Stone Houses of Bergen County, New Jersey, and is listed on the National Register of Historic Places, where its period of significance was given as 1800–1849. In 1861 it was listed as the residence of J.P. Blackledge, and in 1876 as that of Robert Gair.

== See also ==
- National Register of Historic Places listings in Bergen County, New Jersey
