= Cresskill High School =

High school in Bergen County, New Jersey, US

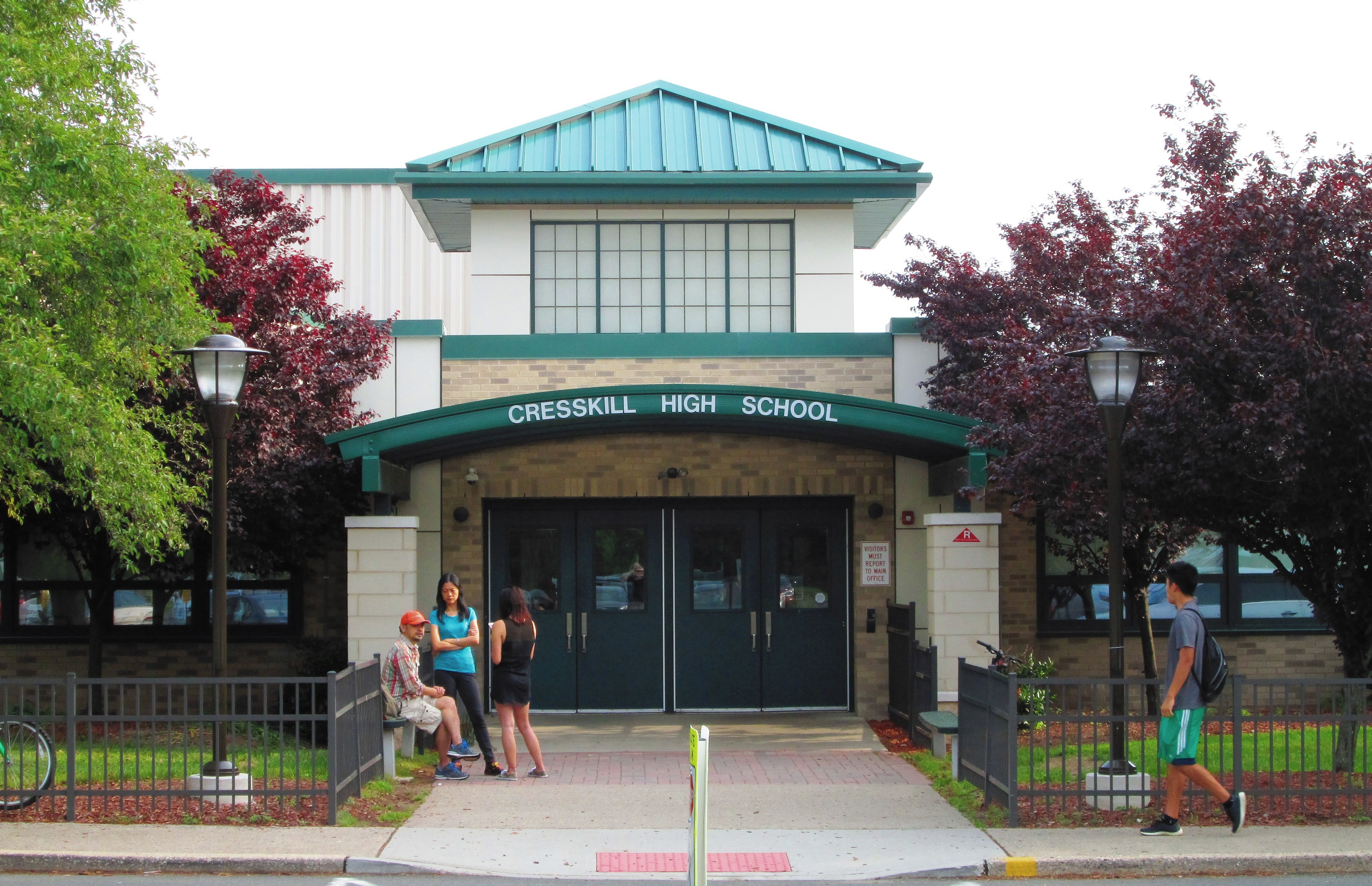
- Main Entrance (2016)

Location
- 1 Lincoln Drive; Cresskill, Bergen County, New Jersey 07626; United States; 40.945053°N 73.964199°W

Information
- Type: Public high school
- Established: October 1962
- School district: Cresskill Public Schools
- NCES School ID: 340360000324
- Principal: John Massaro
- Faculty: 49.5 FTEs
- Grades: 9-12
- Enrollment: 489 (as of 2024–25)
- Student to teacher ratio: 9.9:1
- Colors: Black and Gold
- Athletics conference: North Jersey Interscholastic Conference
- Team name: Cougars
- Yearbook: Images
- Website: www.cresskillboe.k12.nj.us/o/cmshs

Cresskill High School is a four-year comprehensive public high school that serves students in ninth through twelfth grades from Cresskill in Bergen County, in the U.S. state of New Jersey, operating as the lone secondary school of the Cresskill Public Schools. The infrastructure is shared with Cresskill Middle School, which serves Cresskill students in sixth through eighth grade.

As of the 2024–25 school year, the school had an enrollment of 489 students and 49.5 classroom teachers (on an FTE basis), for a student–teacher ratio of 9.9:1. There were 18 students (3.7% of enrollment) eligible for free lunch and 4 (0.8% of students) eligible for reduced-cost lunch.

== History ==
Cresskill's students in grades nine to twelve had attended Tenafly High School until October 1962, with the opening of the initial wing of Cresskill's high school, constructed at a cost of $2.8 million (equivalent to $29.8 million in 2025). Students already in the Tenafly district for grades 11 and 12 when the Cresskill school opened remained at Tenafly High School until graduation, which meant that the first Cresskill graduating class was the Class of 1965.

In September 2021, Hurricane Ida caused millions of dollars in damages to the school facility. Students were put into a local Catholic school St. Therese until repairs at the high school were completed months later.

== Awards, recognition and rankings ==
The school was the 18th-ranked public high school in New Jersey out of 339 schools statewide in New Jersey Monthly magazine's September 2014 cover story on the state's "Top Public High Schools," using a new ranking methodology. The school had been ranked 29th in the state of 328 schools in 2012, after being ranked 55th in 2010 out of 322 schools listed. The magazine ranked the school 2008 out of 316 schools. The school was ranked 15th in the magazine's September 2006 issue, which included 316 schools across the state. Schooldigger.com ranked the school 22nd out of 381 public high schools statewide in its 2011 rankings (an increase of 90 positions from the 2010 ranking) which were based on the combined percentage of students classified as proficient or above proficient on the mathematics (97.1%) and language arts literacy (99.3%) components of the High School Proficiency Assessment (HSPA).

In its listing of "America's Best High Schools 2016," the school was ranked 425th out of 500 best high schools in the country; it was ranked 47th among all high schools in New Jersey and 30th among the state's non-magnet schools.

In its 2013 report on "America's Best High Schools," The Daily Beast ranked the school 361st in the nation among participating public high schools and 31st among schools in New Jersey. The school was ranked 166th in the nation and tenth in New Jersey on the list of "America's Best High Schools 2012" prepared by The Daily Beast / Newsweek, with rankings based primarily on graduation rate, matriculation rate for college and number of Advanced Placement / International Baccalaureate courses taken per student, with lesser factors based on average scores on the SAT / ACT, average AP/IB scores and the number of AP/IB courses available to students.

In the 2011 "Ranking America's High Schools" issue by The Washington Post, the school was ranked 7th in New Jersey and 369th nationwide.

The school was ranked 209th in the 2010 Newsweek magazine ranking of the top 15,000 high schools in the United States, after being ranked 303rd in 2009. It was the sixth-ranked school in New Jersey, with 2.586 AP tests taken in 2008 per graduating senior and 52% of all graduating seniors passing at least one AP exam; The school was ranked 256th nationwide in 2008. In Newsweek's 2007 ranking of the country's top high schools, Cresskill High School was listed in 209th place, the fifth-highest ranked school in New Jersey; the school had been ranked 202nd in the 2006 survey and in 93rd in 2005.

== Athletics ==
The Cresskill High School Cougars participate in the Patriot Division of the North Jersey Interscholastic Conference, which is comprised of small-enrollment schools in Bergen, Hudson County, Morris County and Passaic County counties, and was created following a reorganization of sports leagues in Northern New Jersey by the New Jersey State Interscholastic Athletic Association (NJSIAA). Prior to realignment that took effect in the fall of 2010, Cresskill was a member of the Bergen County Scholastic League (BCSL) in the Olympic Division. With 397 students in grades 10-12, the school was classified by the NJSIAA for the 2019–20 school year as Group I for most athletic competition purposes, which included schools with an enrollment of 75 to 476 students in that grade range. The school's co-op with Emerson Junior-Senior High School was classified by the NJSIAA as Group II North for football for 2024–2026, which included schools with 484 to 683 students.

The school participates in a joint ice hockey team with Tenafly High School as the host school / lead agency. The co-op program operates under agreements scheduled to expire at the end of the 2023–24 school year.

The girls volleyball team won the Group I state championship in 1982 (defeating North Arlington High School in the final match of the tournament), 2002 (vs. Secaucus High School) and 2003 (vs. North Arlington). The 1982 team defeated North Arlington in two games (15–4, 15–12) in the playoff championship. The team won the 2002 Group I championship, sweeping Secaucus High School (15–10, 15–7) in the final match. The 2003 team repeated the title, defeating North Arlington High School in the final.

The football team won the NJSIAA North I Group I state sectional championship in 1984, 1987, 1989, 1992 and 1997. The 1984 team finished the season with an 11-0 record after winning the North I Group I state sectional title with a 30-0 win against North Arlington High School in the championship game. A 21-7 win against Pompton Lakes High School in the playoff finals gave the 1987 team the North I Group I state sectional championship and an 11-0 record. The 1989 team finished the season at 10-0-1 after winning the North I Group I state title with a 31-28 victory against Pompton Lakes High School in the championship game.

The boys' wrestling team won the North I Group I state sectional title in 1997 and 1998.

The 2001 boys' basketball team defeated Secaucus High School by 61–50, to win the finals of the North I, Group I tournament. They finished with a school-best 26–2 record. The 2002 boys' basketball team defeated Bogota High School by a score of 70–56 in the tournament final to win the North I, Group I state sectional tournament, finishing the season with a record of 22–5.

The 2001 boys' tennis team won the North Jersey Group I sectional championship, defeating Waldwick High School 4–1.

The girls' tennis team defeated Verona High School 3–2, to win the 2005 North I, Group I sectional title.

In 2006, Cresskill played in the finals of the 2006 NJSIAA North I, Group I girls soccer tournament, falling to Kinnelon High School by a score of 5–0.

In 2007 and 2009, Cresskill won its group at the Bergen County Meet in track.

In 2010, the boys basketball team defeated Boonton High School 60-59 to capture the North I Group I state sectional title on a basket scored with 10 seconds remaining in the game.

With the group finals cancelled as result of COVID-19, the girls basketball team was declared as the North I regional champion. The 2003 team won the North I, Group I title with a win over previously unbeaten County Prep High School, by a 71–65 score. The 2004 team repeated the feat, winning their third consecutive title by defeating North Warren Regional High School, 74–61, in the tournament final. In 2008, the girl's varsity basketball team won the North I, Group I state sectional championship with a 59–44 win over Belvidere High School.

== Notable alumni ==
- Stephen Dadaian (born 1987), electric and classical guitarist.
- John Ricco (born 1968), assistant general manager of the New York Mets.
- Tom Rinaldi, reporter for Fox Sports
- Ani Sarkisian (born 1995), footballer who plays as a forward for the Armenia women's national team.

== Administration ==
The school's principal is John Massaro; his administration team includes an assistant principal.
