= Benjamin P. Westervelt House =

Historic house in New Jersey, United States

- U.S. National Register of Historic Places
- New Jersey Register of Historic Places
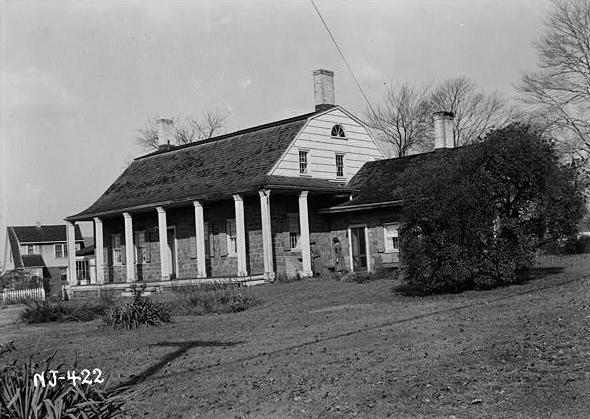
- (HABS, 1938)

- Location within Bergen County, New Jersey Location within New Jersey Location within the United States
- Location: 235 County Road; Cresskill, New Jersey
- Coordinates: 40°56′33″N 73°57′27″W
- Built: 1808
- Architect: Benjamin Westervelt
- Architectural style: Dutch Colonial
- MPS: Stone Houses of Bergen County TR
- NRHP reference No.: 83001583
- NJRHP No.: 451

Significant dates
- Added to NRHP: January 9, 1983
- Designated NJRHP: October 3, 1980

The Benjamin P. Westervelt House, located at 253 County Road in Cresskill, Bergen County, New Jersey, was the home of Benjamin P. Westervelt, a member of the local militia during the American Revolutionary War. The main wing of the Dutch Colonial-style house was built by Westervelt in 1808, but the Westervelt family has continuously occupied the site since at least 1778.

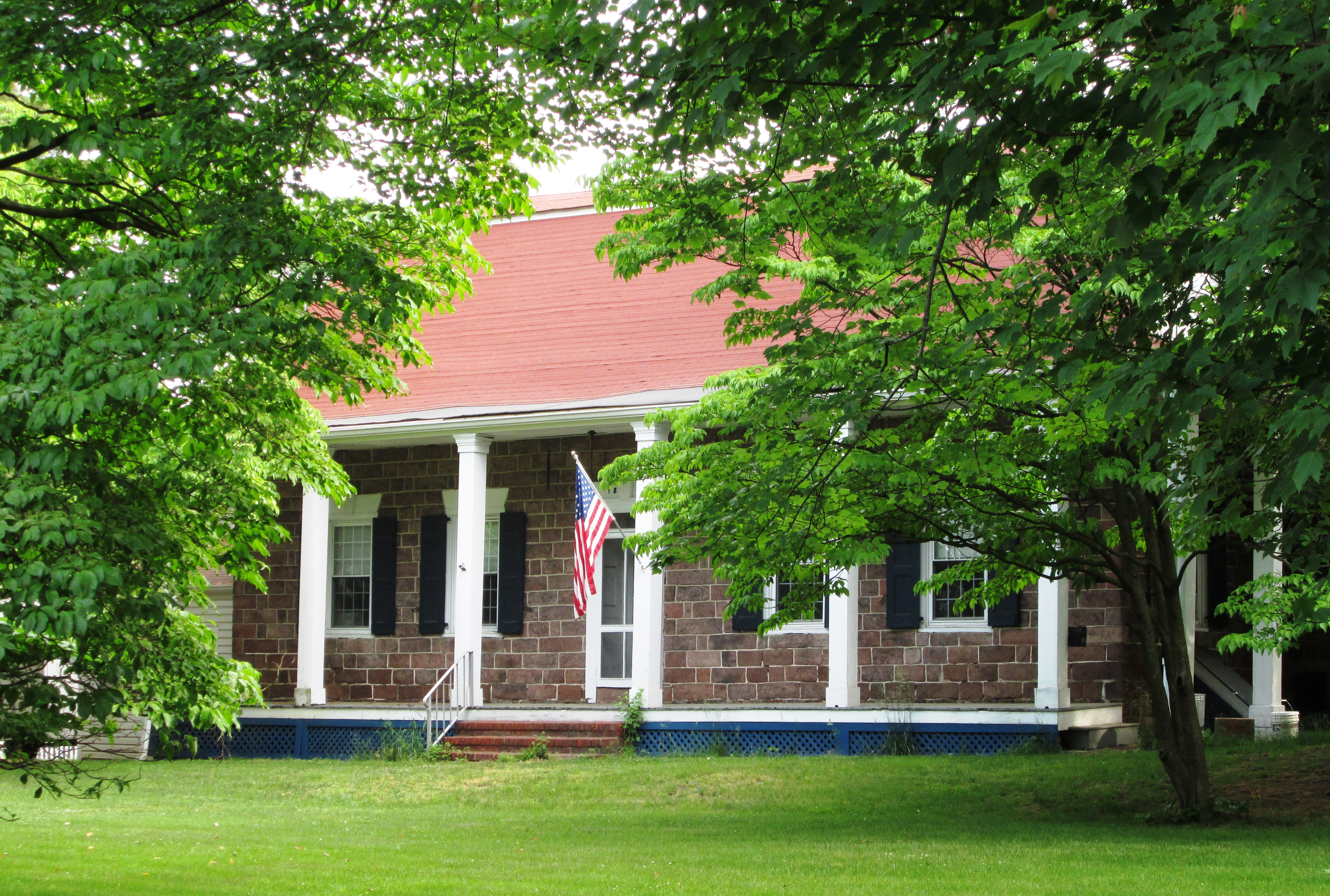
(2016)

The house, which has been used as a background in several films, was listed on New Jersey Register of Historic Places in 1980, and the National Register of Historic Places in 1983.

== See also ==
- National Register of Historic Places listings in Bergen County, New Jersey
