= Cresskill Public Schools =

School district in Bergen County, New Jersey, US

Address
- 1 Lincoln Drive Cresskill, Bergen County, New Jersey, 07626; United States
- Coordinates: 40.945053°N 73.964199°W

District information
- Grades: Pre-K to 12
- Superintendent: Lauren Thomas
- Business administrator: Dawn Delasandro
- Schools: 4

Students and staff
- Enrollment: 1,681 (as of 2022–23)
- Faculty: 147.0 FTEs
- Student–teacher ratio: 11.4:1

Other information
- District Factor Group: I
- Website: www.cresskillboe.k12.nj.us
Ind.	Per pupil	District spending	Rank (*)	K-12 average	%± vs. average
1A	Total Spending	$17,682	25	$18,891	−6.4%
1	Budgetary Cost	13,750	26	14,783	−7.0%
2	Classroom Instruction	8,535	30	8,763	−2.6%
6	Support Services	1,812	12	2,392	−24.2%
8	Administrative Cost	1,763	34	1,485	18.7%
10	Operations & Maintenance	1,257	7	1,783	−29.5%
13	Extracurricular Activities	384	16	268	43.3%
16	Median Teacher Salary	67,850	43	64,043
Data from NJDoE 2014 Taxpayers' Guide to Education Spending. *Of K-12 districts with up to 1,800 students. Lowest spending=1; Highest=49

The Cresskill Public Schools is a comprehensive community public school district serve students in pre-kindergarten through twelfth grade from Cresskill in Bergen County, in the U.S. state of New Jersey. The district is governed by a board of education and administered by a superintendent of schools, a school business administrator / board secretary, and principals, as part of the district's staff of more than 320 employees.

As of the 2022–23 school year, the district, comprising four schools, had an enrollment of 1,681 students and 147.0 classroom teachers (on an FTE basis), for a student–teacher ratio of 11.4:1.

The district had been classified by the New Jersey Department of Education as being in District Factor Group "I", the second-highest of eight groupings. District Factor Groups organize districts statewide to allow comparison by common socioeconomic characteristics of the local districts. From lowest socioeconomic status to highest, the categories are A, B, CD, DE, FG, GH, I and J.

== Awards, recognition and rankings ==
In Newsweek's May 22, 2007 issue, ranking the country's top high schools, Cresskill High School was listed in 209th place, the fifth-highest ranked school in New Jersey; the school had been ranked 202nd in the 2006 survey and in 93rd in 2005.

Cresskill High School was the 39th-ranked public high school in New Jersey out of 328 schools statewide, in New Jersey Monthly magazine's September 2012 cover story on the state's Top Public High Schools.

== Schools ==
Schools in the district (with 2022–23 enrollment data from the National Center for Education Statistics) are:

Elementary schools

- Edward H. Bryan School with 531 students grades PreK–5
  - Dayle Collins, principal
- Merritt Memorial School with 276 students in grades PreK–5
  - Jacqueline Peguero, principal

Middle / high school

- Cresskill High School with 398 students in middle school for grades 6–8 and 474 in high school for grades 9–12
  - John Massaro, principal

== Administration ==
Core members of the district's administration are:

- Lauren Thomas, superintendent.
- Dawn Delasandro, business administrator and board secretary

== Board of education ==
The district's board of education, composed of nine members, sets policy and oversees the fiscal and educational operation of the district through its administration. As a Type II school district, the board's trustees are elected directly by voters to serve three-year terms of office on a staggered basis, with three seats up for election each year held (since 2012) as part of the November general election. The board appoints a superintendent to oversee the district's day-to-day operations and a business administrator to supervise the business functions of the district.
