= New Edinburg Commercial Historic District =

Historic district in Arkansas, United States

- U.S. National Register of Historic Places
- U.S. Historic district
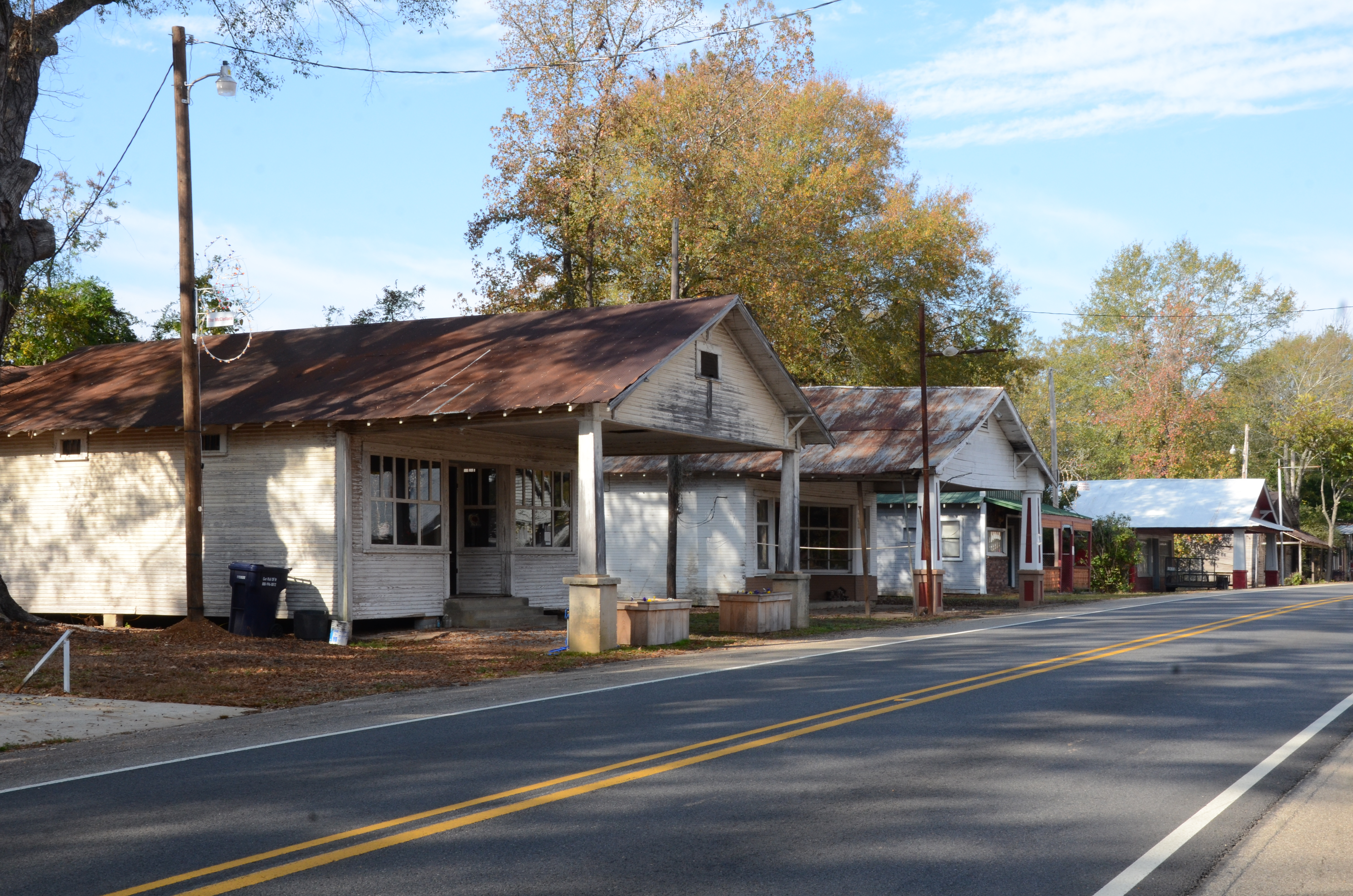

- Location within Arkansas Location within the United States
- Location: AR 8, New Edinburg, Arkansas
- Coordinates: 33.75855°N 92.2403°W
- Area: 5.3 acres (2.1 ha)
- Architectural style: Bungalow/craftsman, et al.
- NRHP reference No.: 01001118
- Added to NRHP: October 22, 2001

The New Edinburg Commercial Historic District encompasses the historic commercial center of New Edinburg, Arkansas. It includes ten contributing buildings (of eleven within its boundaries) lining Arkansas Highway 8, just north of its junction with Farm Market and Banks Roads. At the time of its listing on the National Register of Historic Places in 2001, all of these buildings, built between c. 1898 and 1940, stood vacant, reflecting the decline of the area.

New Edinburg has never had a population more than 200. At its height, the center of the town included six general stores, a cafe, a hotel, a blacksmith, and an automotive service garage. The hotel was built c. 1879, and served as such until 1910, when it was converted to a residence. The blacksmithy is a utilitarian wood-frame building with a metal roof, built c. 1936, which was used by two blacksmiths. The service station was built of similar materials in 1940, and (as of 2001) housed the local volunteer fire department. The cafe building dates to about 1928, but does not contribute to the district because of significant modifications to its facade in 2000.

Of the general stores, the Parrot Grocery Store is one of the oldest buildings in the district. It was supposedly used as a Methodist church before being moved to its present location c. 1900 and converted to retail use. Like most of the other stores, it is clad in weatherboard, with a metal gable roof. Two of the stores, the Hamaker-Hearnsberger Store and the Parham Store (both c. 1920), retain elements of car canopies on their fronts; the latter also originally had gasoline pumps. There is one residential house in the district, a brick-sheathed frame building built c. 1948.

== See also ==
- National Register of Historic Places listings in Cleveland County, Arkansas
