= Barnett-Attwood House =

Historic house in Arkansas, United States

- U.S. National Register of Historic Places
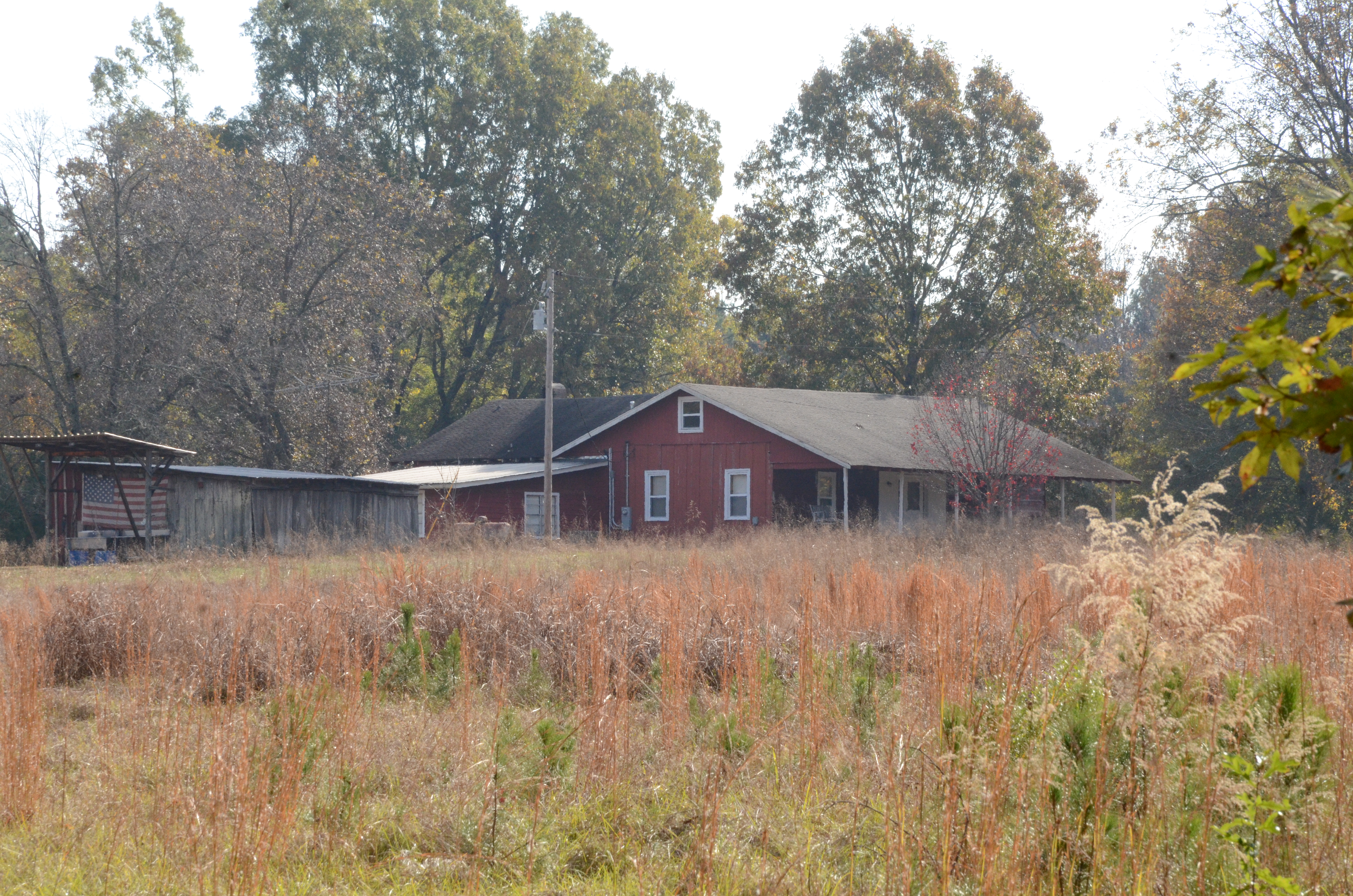

- Location within Arkansas Location within the United States
- Interactive map showing the location Of Barnett-Attwood House
- Nearest city: New Edinburg, Arkansas
- Coordinates: 33°46′50″N 92°13′7″W
- Area: less than one acre
- Built: 1836
- Built by: Barnett, Nathaniel
- Architectural style: Dog-trot
- NRHP reference No.: 77000247
- Added to NRHP: July 29, 1977

The Barnett-Attwood House is a historic house outside New Edinburg in Cleveland County, Arkansas. It is believed to be the oldest standing structure in the county.

== Description and history ==
It was built c. 1835-36 by Nathaniel Barnett, one of the earliest settlers in the area. The structure he built is a five-room dogtrot house fashioned out of hand hewn pine timbers with square notches. This original structure still rests on its original pilings, but is also supported by a brick foundation. In 1961, its owner, C. W. Attwood, a Barnett descendant, added an L-shaped addition onto the rear, and renovated the original portion of the house, carefully maintaining the appearance by using hand hewn timbers when necessary.

The house was listed on the National Register of Historic Places on July 29, 1977.

== See also ==
- National Register of Historic Places listings in Cleveland County, Arkansas
