= Demarest–Atwood House =

Historic house in New Jersey, United States

- U.S. National Register of Historic Places
- New Jersey Register of Historic Places
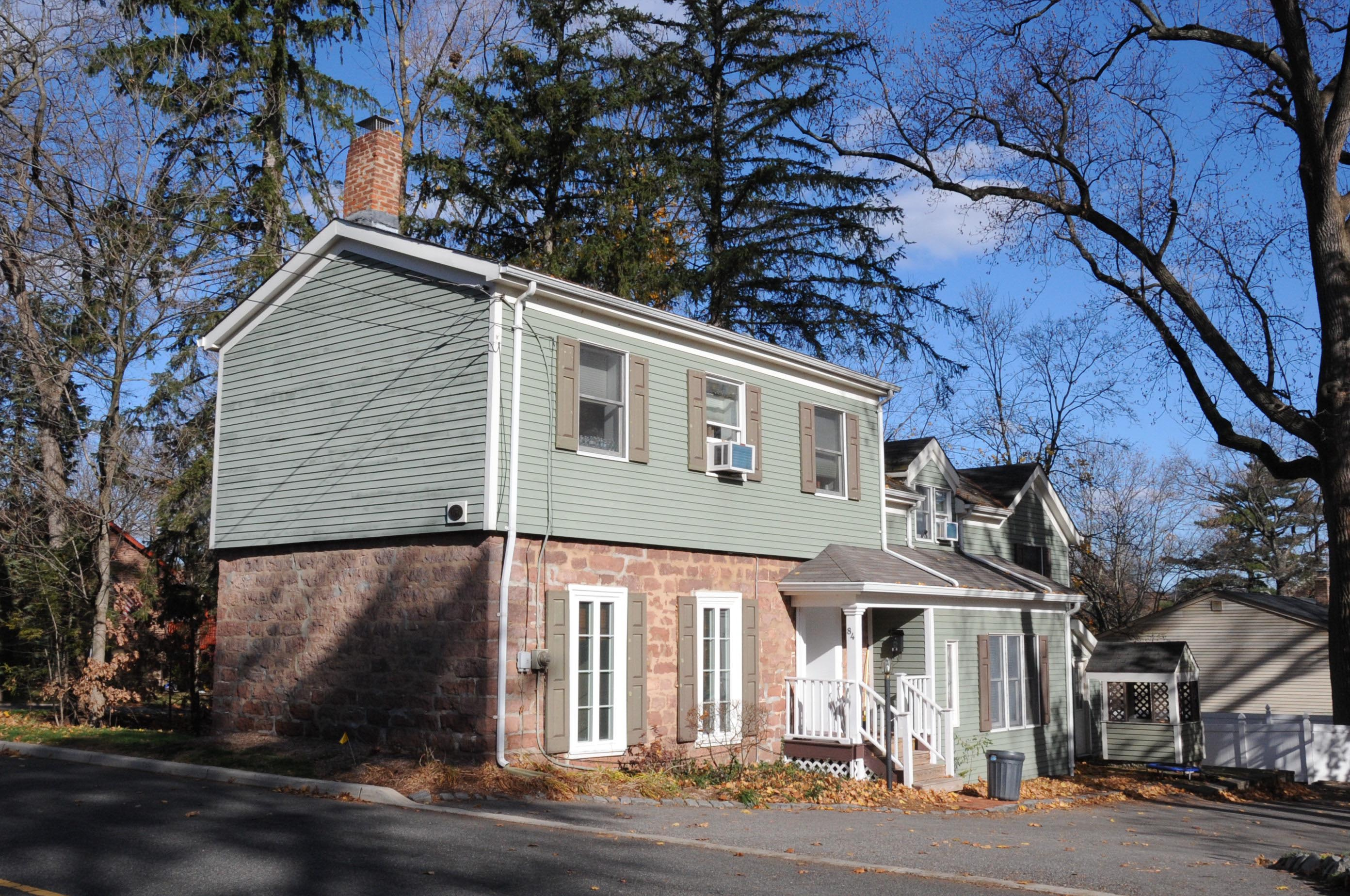

- Location within Bergen County, New Jersey Location within New Jersey Location within the United States
- Location: 84 Jefferson Avenue, Cresskill, New Jersey
- Coordinates: 40°56′14″N 73°58′13″W
- Built: 1793
- Architectural style: Late Victorian
- MPS: Stone Houses of Bergen County TR
- NRHP reference No.: 84002548
- NJRHP No.: 449

Significant dates
- Added to NRHP: July 24, 1984
- Designated NJRHP: October 3, 1980

The Demarest–Atwood House is located at 84 Jefferson Avenue in the borough of Cresskill in Bergen County, New Jersey, United States. The historic stone house was built in 1793 according to tradition. It was added to the National Register of Historic Places on July 24, 1984, for its significance in architecture and exploration/settlement. It was listed as part of the Early Stone Houses of Bergen County Multiple Property Submission (MPS).

According to the nomination form, the house was likely built by a member of the Demarest family in 1793. George Demarest lived here in 1861. It was later known as the Atwood House, since Arthur and Daniel Atwood lived here.

== See also ==
- National Register of Historic Places listings in Bergen County, New Jersey
