= Attwood-Hopson House =

Historic house in Arkansas, United States

- Attwood–Hopson House
- U.S. National Register of Historic Places
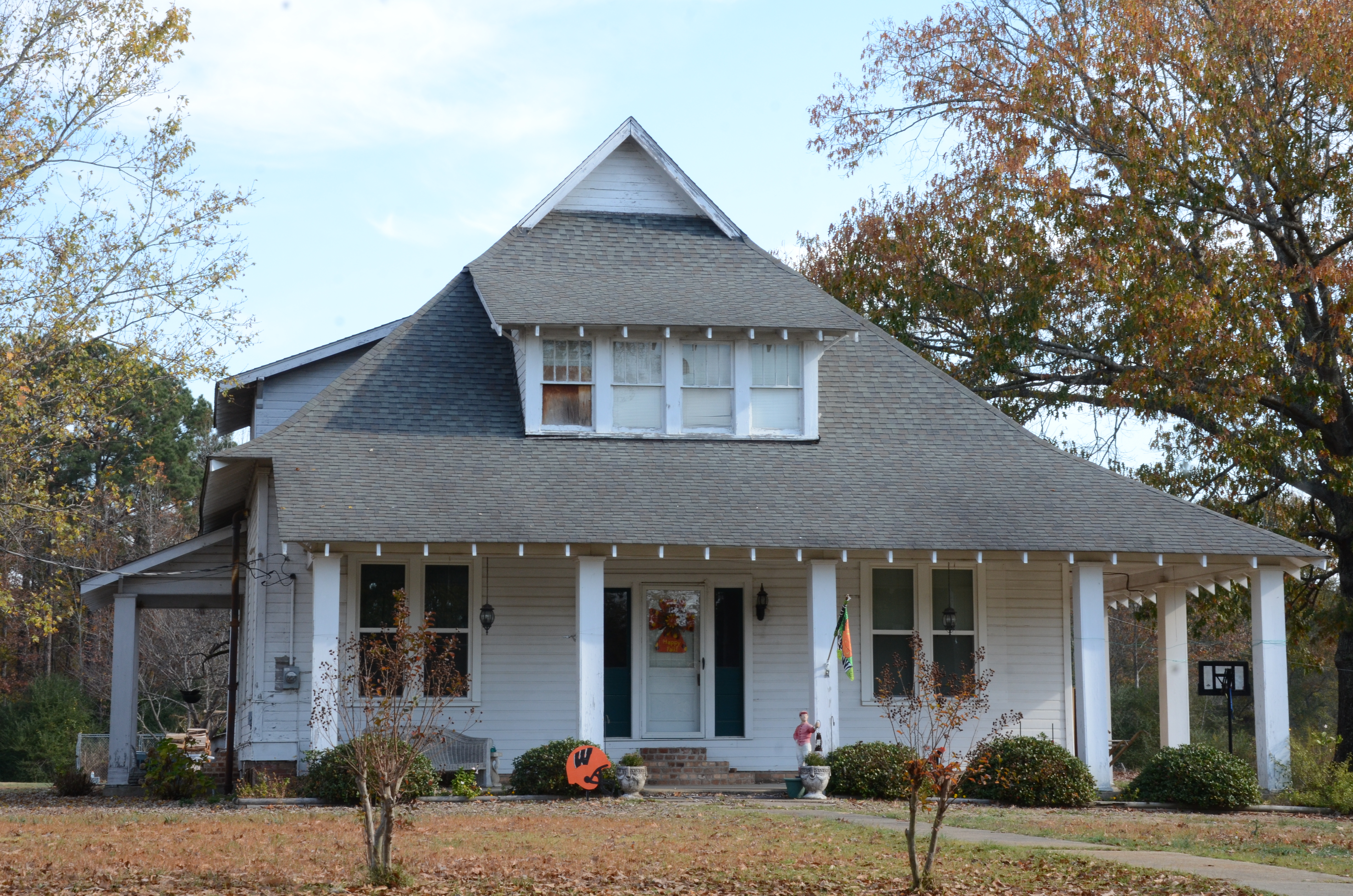

- Location within Arkansas Location within the United States
- Location: AR 8, N side, New Edinburg, Arkansas
- Coordinates: 33°45′35″N 92°14′27″W
- Area: 2 acres (0.81 ha)
- Built: 1917
- Built by: Emmett Moseley
- Architectural style: Bungalow/craftsman
- NRHP reference No.: 94000848
- Added to NRHP: August 16, 1994

The Attwood-Hopson House is a historic house on the east side of Arkansas Highway 8 on the northern fringe of New Edinburg, Arkansas. The house was built c. 1890 by William Attwood, a local merchant. It was built in the then-fashionable Queen Anne style, but was significantly remade in the Craftsman style in 1917 by builder Emmett Moseley. It is a 1 1/2-story wood-frame house built on a foundation of poured concrete and brick piers. Its roof is a multi-level gable-on-hip design, with shed dormers on each elevation. A porch wraps around three sides of the building, and is extended at the back to provide a carport. The interior was not significantly remade in 1917, and retains Colonial Revival details.

In addition to being a distinctive local instance of Craftsman styling, the house was the first in the area to be wired for electricity at the time of its construction. It was listed on the National Register of Historic Places in 1994, at which time it was owned by the Hopson family.

== See also ==
- National Register of Historic Places listings in Cleveland County, Arkansas
