= Cleveland County Courthouse (Arkansas) =

- U.S. National Register of Historic Places
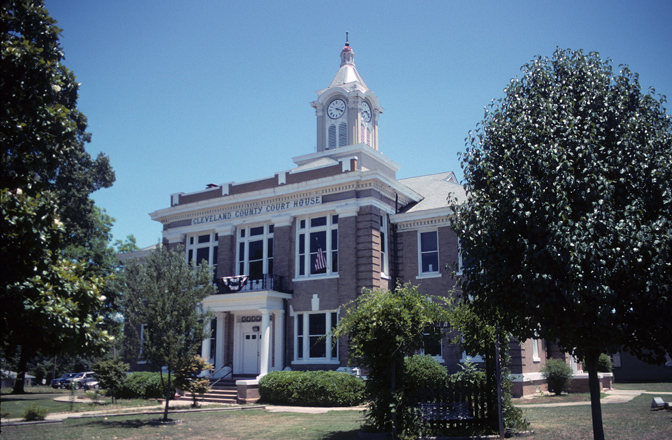
- Cleveland County Courthouse

- Location within Arkansas Location within the United States
- Interactive map showing the location of Cleveland County Courthouse
- Location: Main and Magnolia, Rison, Arkansas
- Coordinates: 33°57′33″N 92°11′4″W
- Built: 1911
- NRHP reference No.: 77000248
- Added to NRHP: April 11, 1977

The Cleveland County Courthouse in Rison, Arkansas, was built in 1911. Located at Main and Magnolia Streets, it is a two-story brick structure measuring 100 feet (30 m) by 70 feet (21 m), and topped by a hipped tile roof. A square central tower rises 20 feet (6.1 m) above the roof, and includes a four-faced clock, with louvered arches below the clock, and an arched cornice above, topped by an octagonal cupola.

The courthouse was listed on the National Register of Historic Places in 1977.

== See also ==
- Cleveland County Clerk's Building
- National Register of Historic Places listings in Cleveland County, Arkansas
