= Magnolia Petroleum Company Filling Station =

- U.S. National Register of Historic Places
- Location within Arkansas Location within the United States
- Location: SW of intersection of Larch & 1st Sts., Kingsland, Arkansas
- Coordinates: 33°51′32″N 92°17′44″W
- Area: less than one acre
- Built: c. 1930
- NRHP reference No.: 100003325
- Added to NRHP: January 24, 2019

The Magnolia Petroleum Company Filling Station is a historic automotive service station building at Larch and 1st Streets in Kingsland, Arkansas. It is a small single-story masonry building, built of red and buff brick and covered by a gabled roof. The front facade has a door on the left side and a plate glass window (now boarded up) on the right. A concrete pad in front of the building originally supported the fuel pumps. The building was built about 1930, and is a good example of an early filling station with Tudor and Craftsman features, built to a Magnolia Company design which was used for at least one other filling station, in North Little Rock (which was destroyed after a fire in 2018).

The building was listed on the National Register of Historic Places in 2019.

A similarly named filling station in Fayetteville, Arkansas, in northwest Arkansas, was listed on the National Register in 1978 as the Magnolia Company Filling Station.

== See also ==
- List of historic filling stations in the United States
- National Register of Historic Places listings in Cleveland County, Arkansas
