= Cresskill, New Jersey =

Borough in Bergen County, New Jersey, US

- Borough
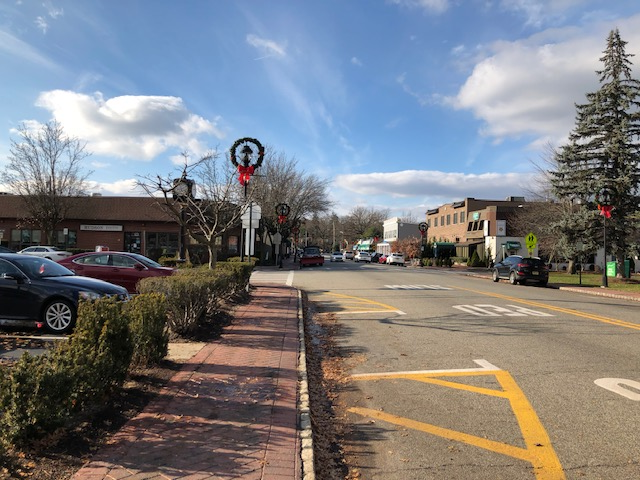

- Seal

- Location of Cresskill in Bergen County highlighted in red (left). Inset map: Location of Bergen County in New Jersey highlighted in orange (right).

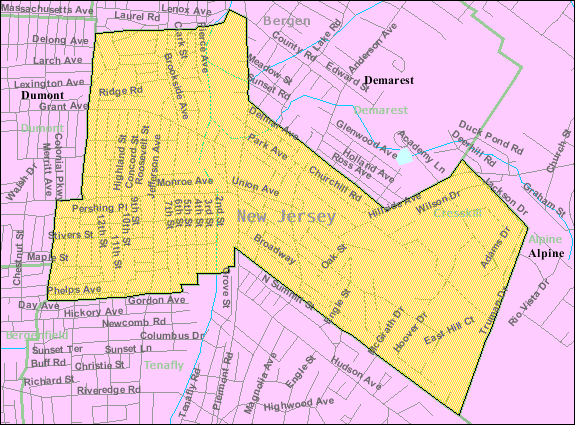
- Census Bureau map of Cresskill, New Jersey

- Location in Bergen County Location in New Jersey Location in the United States
- Coordinates: 40.939786°N 73.958581°W
- Country: United States
- State: New Jersey
- County: Bergen
- Incorporated: May 8, 1894

Government
  - Type: Borough
  - Body: Borough Council
  - Mayor: John Morgan (R, unexpired term ending December 31, 2027)
  - Administrator: Dianne Lavin
  - Municipal clerk: Francesca Maragliano

Area
  - Total: 2.07 sq mi (5.36 km^{2})
  - Land: 2.07 sq mi (5.35 km^{2})
  - Water: 0.0039 sq mi (0.01 km^{2}) 0.24%
  - Rank: 407th of 565 in state 47th of 70 in county
- Elevation: 46 ft (14 m)

Population (2020)
  - Total: 9,155
  - Estimate (2023): 9,118
  - Rank: 259th of 565 in state 44th of 70 in county
  - Density: 4,433.4/sq mi (1,711.7/km^{2})
  - Rank: 140th of 565 in state 36th of 70 in county
- Time zone: UTC−05:00 (Eastern (EST))
  - Summer (DST): UTC−04:00 (Eastern (EDT))
- ZIP Code: 07626
- Area code: 201
- FIPS code: 3400315820
- GNIS feature ID: 0875723
- Website: www.cresskillboro.com

Cresskill is a borough in Bergen County, in the U.S. state of New Jersey. As of the 2020 United States census, the borough's population was 9,155, an increase of 582 (+6.8%) from the 2010 census count of 8,573, which in turn reflected an increase of 827 (+10.7%) from the 7,746 counted in the 2000 census. This borough got its name from "Cress", referring to the watercress that grew in its streams, and "Kill", referring to the stream passing through.

== History ==
Cresskill was incorporated as a borough by an act of the New Jersey Legislature on May 8, 1894, from portions of Palisades Township. The borough was formed during the "Boroughitis" phenomenon then sweeping through Bergen County, in which 26 boroughs were formed in the county in 1894 alone. A portion of the borough was annexed by Alpine in 1904.

Railroads provided access from Cresskill to customers in New York City, including a chicken hatchery that was the world's largest by 1897. Railroad access established the former Camp Merritt as a major debarkation point for more than a million American troops being sent abroad to fight in World War I. To commemorate the fact, a large obelisk memorial (referred to by locals as "The Monument"), or "The Circle Monument" was dedicated in 1924, set in the center of the Camp Merritt Memorial Circle at the intersection of Madison Avenue and Knickerbocker Road (CR 505). The northwest quarter of the Camp Merritt Memorial Circle intersection is located in Dumont, New Jersey, making it a locally-known boundary of the two boroughs.

=== Historic sites ===
Sites in the borough listed on the National Register of Historic Places include:

- Blackledge-Gair House (at 111 Madison Avenue; added January 9, 1983)
- Demarest-Atwood House (at 84 Jefferson Avenue; added July 24, 1984)
- Peter Huyler House (50 County Road; added January 9, 1983)
- Benjamin P. Westervelt House (at 235 County Road; added January 9, 1983)

== Geography ==
According to the United States Census Bureau, the borough had a total area of 2.07 square miles (5.36 km^{2}), including 2.07 square miles (5.35 km^{2}) of land and 0.01 square miles (0.01 km^{2}) of water (0.24%).

It rests on land originally inhabited by the Munsee-Delaware.

The borough, a suburb of New York City, borders the Bergen County municipalities of Alpine, Bergenfield, Demarest, Dumont and Tenafly.

== Demographics ==
Historical population
Census	Pop.	Note	%±
1880	333		—
1890	527		58.3%
1900	486		−7.8%
1910	550		13.2%
1920	942		71.3%
1930	1,924		104.2%
1940	2,246		16.7%
1950	3,534		57.3%
1960	7,290		106.3%
1970	8,298		13.8%
1980	7,609		−8.3%
1990	7,558		−0.7%
2000	7,746		2.5%
2010	8,573		10.7%
2020	9,155		6.8%
2023 (est.)	9,118	▼	−0.4%
Population sources: 1880–1890; 1890–1920 1900–1910; 1910–1930 1900–2020; 2000 2010 2020

=== Racial and ethnic composition ===
Cresskill borough, Bergen County, New Jersey – Racial and ethnic composition Note: the US Census treats Hispanic/Latino as an ethnic category. This table excludes Latinos from the racial categories and assigns them to a separate category. Hispanics/Latinos may be of any race.
Race / Ethnicity (NH = Non-Hispanic)	Pop 2000	Pop 2010	Pop 2020	% 2000	% 2010	% 2020
White alone (NH)	5,801	5,500	5,305	74.89%	64.15%	57.95%
Black or African American alone (NH)	70	57	90	0.90%	0.66%	0.98%
Native American or Alaska Native alone (NH)	3	2	3	0.04%	0.02%	0.03%
Asian alone (NH)	1,441	2,367	2,865	18.60%	27.61%	31.29%
Native Hawaiian or Pacific Islander alone (NH)	0	1	1	0.00%	0.01%	0.01%
Other race alone (NH)	15	7	37	0.19%	0.08%	0.40%
Mixed race or Multiracial (NH)	107	102	224	1.38%	1.19%	2.45%
Hispanic or Latino (any race)	309	537	630	3.99%	6.26%	6.88%
Total	7,746	8,573	9,155	100.00%	100.00%	100.00%

=== 2020 census ===
As of the 2020 census, Cresskill had a population of 9,155. The median age was 44.5 years. 26.1% of residents were under the age of 18 and 19.4% of residents were 65 years of age or older. For every 100 females there were 92.3 males, and for every 100 females age 18 and over there were 85.7 males age 18 and over.

100.0% of residents lived in urban areas, while 0.0% lived in rural areas.

There were 3,015 households, of which 42.4% had children under the age of 18 living in them. Of all households, 68.4% were married-couple households, 8.7% were households with a male householder and no spouse or partner present, and 21.2% were households with a female householder and no spouse or partner present. About 17.9% of all households were made up of individuals and 12.8% had someone living alone who was 65 years of age or older.

There were 3,157 housing units, of which 4.5% were vacant. The homeowner vacancy rate was 1.9% and the rental vacancy rate was 6.4%.

=== 2010 census ===
The 2010 United States census counted 8,573 people, 3,002 households, and 2,318 families in the borough. The population density was 4,154.5 per square mile (1,604.1/km^{2}). There were 3,114 housing units at an average density of 1,509.0 per square mile (582.6/km^{2}). The racial makeup was 68.95% (5,911) White, 0.73% (63) Black or African American, 0.03% (3) Native American, 27.64% (2,370) Asian, 0.01% (1) Pacific Islander, 1.07% (92) from other races, and 1.55% (133) from two or more races. Hispanic or Latino of any race were 6.26% (537) of the population. Korean Americans accounted for 17.8% of the population.

Of the 3,002 households, 40.5% had children under the age of 18; 66.2% were married couples living together; 7.9% had a female householder with no husband present and 22.8% were non-families. Of all households, 21.1% were made up of individuals and 15.4% had someone living alone who was 65 years of age or older. The average household size was 2.84 and the average family size was 3.32. Same-sex couples headed 7 households in 2010, an increase from the 5 counted in 2000.

26.8% of the population were under the age of 18, 5.4% from 18 to 24, 20.6% from 25 to 44, 29.8% from 45 to 64, and 17.4% who were 65 years of age or older. The median age was 43.7 years. For every 100 females, the population had 88.6 males. For every 100 females ages 18 and older there were 85.7 males.

The Census Bureau's 2006–2010 American Community Survey showed that (in 2010 inflation-adjusted dollars) median household income was $105,625 (with a margin of error of +/− $14,945) and the median family income was $128,382 (+/− $16,732). Males had a median income of $95,795 (+/− $24,665) versus $72,188 (+/− $16,155) for females. The per capita income for the borough was $56,485 (+/− $6,202). About 2.4% of families and 4.0% of the population were below the poverty line, including 1.8% of those under age 18 and 9.4% of those age 65 or over.

=== 2000 census ===
As of the 2000 United States census there were 7,746 people, 2,630 households, and 2,161 families residing in the borough. The population density was 3,625.9 inhabitants per square mile (1,400.0/km^{2}). There were 2,702 housing units at an average density of 1,264.8 per square mile (488.3/km^{2}). The racial makeup of the borough was 78.05% White, 0.92% African American, 0.04% Native American, 18.64% Asian, 0.65% from other races, and 1.70% from two or more races. Hispanic or Latino of any race were 3.99% of the population.

There were 2,630 households, out of which 40.6% had children under the age of 18 living with them, 71.1% were married couples living together, 8.5% had a female householder with no husband present, and 17.8% were non-families. 15.9% of all households were made up of individuals, and 9.7% had someone living alone who was 65 years of age or older. The average household size was 2.91 and the average family size was 3.26.

In the borough the age distribution of the population shows 26.3% under the age of 18, 4.7% from 18 to 24, 26.4% from 25 to 44, 25.7% from 45 to 64, and 16.9% who were 65 years of age or older. The median age was 41 years. For every 100 females, there were 92.7 males. For every 100 females age 18 and over, there were 88.2 males.

The median income for a household in the borough was $84,692, and the median income for a family was $96,245. Males had a median income of $61,194 versus $38,990 for females. The per capita income for the borough was $41,573. About 1.7% of families and 3.0% of the population were below the poverty line, including 3.7% of those under age 18 and 3.9% of those age 65 or over.

== Government ==
=== Local government ===
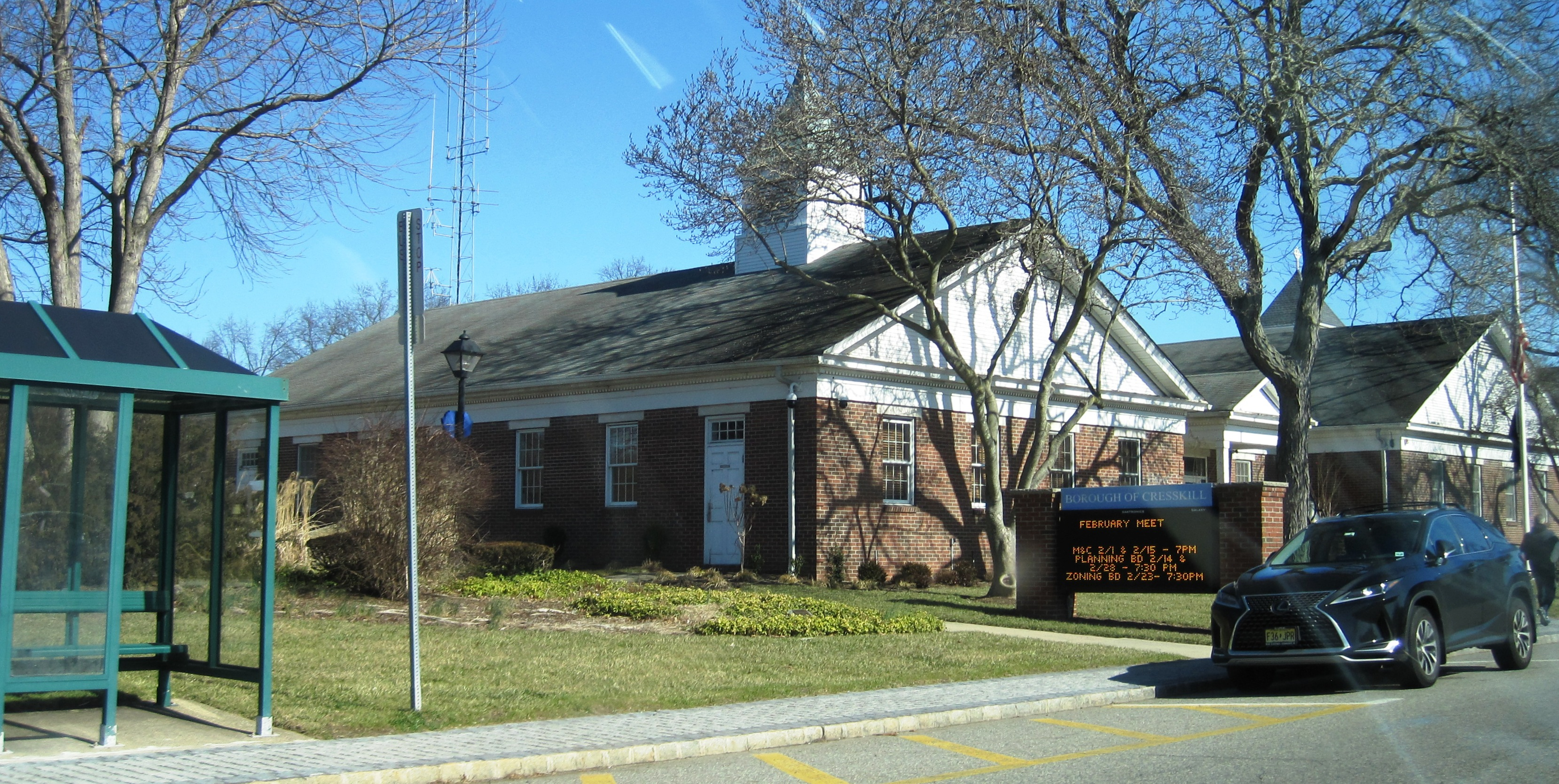
Cresskill Municipal Building

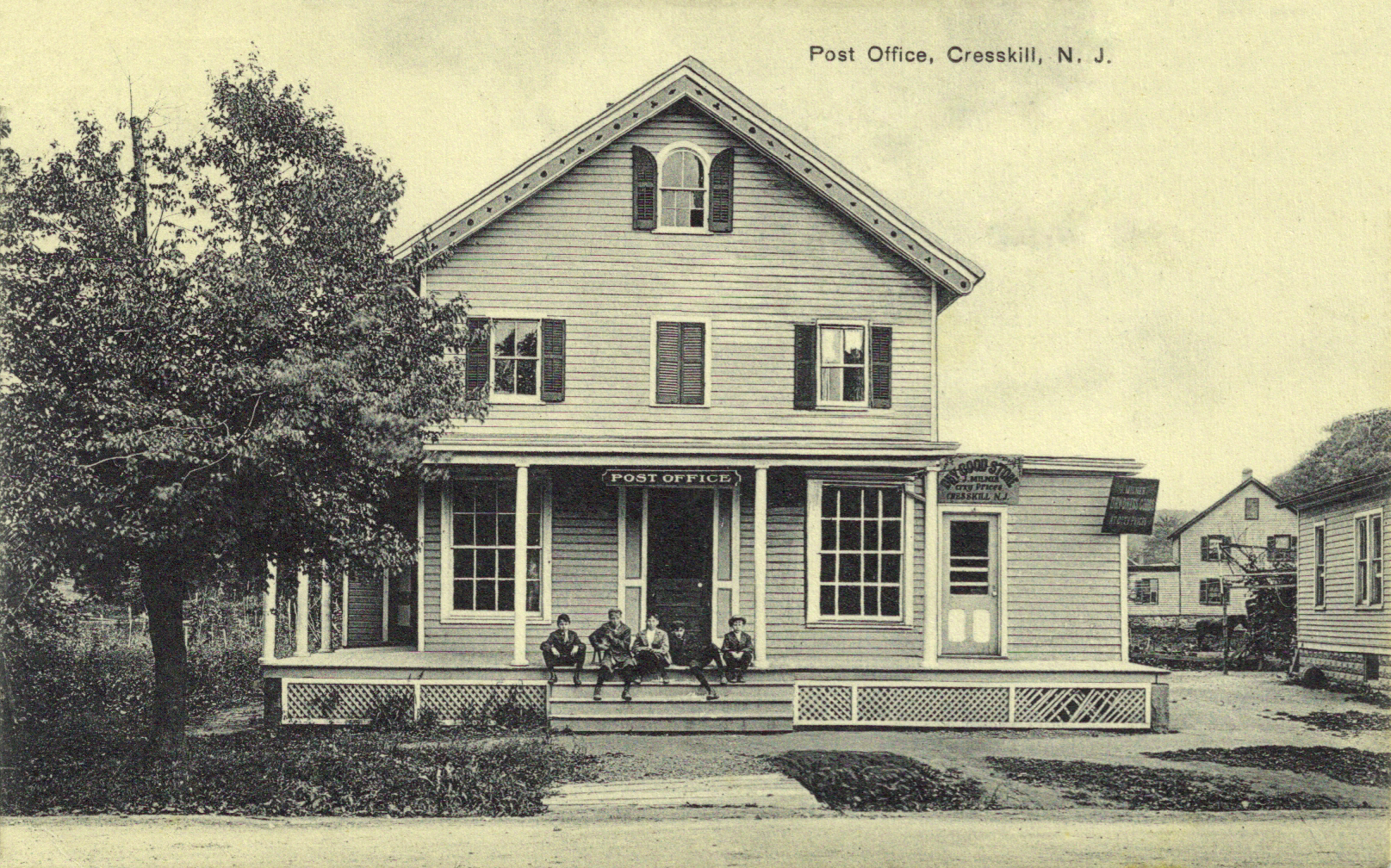
The post office in Cresskill, c. 1915

Cresskill is governed under the borough form of New Jersey municipal government, which is used in 218 municipalities (of the 564) statewide, making it the most common form of government in New Jersey. The governing body is comprised of the mayor and the borough council, with all positions elected at-large on a partisan basis as part of the November general election. A mayor is elected directly by the voters to a four-year term of office. The borough council includes six members elected to serve three-year terms on a staggered basis, with two seats coming up for election each year in a three-year cycle. The borough form of government used by Cresskill is a "weak mayor / strong council" government in which council members act as the legislative body with the mayor presiding at meetings and voting only in the event of a tie. The mayor can veto ordinances subject to an override by a two-thirds majority vote of the council. The mayor makes committee and liaison assignments for council members, and most appointments are made by the mayor with the advice and consent of the council.

As of 2026, the mayor of the Borough of Cresskill is Republican John Morgan, who was appointed to serve a term of office ending on December 31, 2027. Members of the Cresskill Borough Council are Saverio Costa (R, 2028), Cheryl Furio (R, 2028), Arthur J. McLaughlin (D, 2026), Hector Olmo (R, 2026), Kathleen Savas (D, 2027), and Kathy M. Schultz-Rummel (R, 2027).

In February 2025, following the death of long time mayor Republican Benedict Romeo, the position of the mayor of the Borough of Cresskill was filled by John Morgan. Morgan who previously held the position of President the Board of Health, served on an interim basis until the November 2025, and then was elected in the November 2025 elections. Long time mayor Benedict Romeo served six terms as mayor, having first been elected to the position in 1999 died at the age of 77.

=== Emergency services ===
The Cresskill Fire Department is a combination career and volunteer fire department that serves Cresskill and neighboring municipalities. The Fire Department is led by a Career Chief of Department and a Volunteer Deputy Chief, that lead the career and volunteer firefighters. The CFD is comprised of a squad truck, two engines, one ladder truck, and a rescue vehicle. Since Cresskill's EMS service closed down in 2015, Emergency Medical Services are provided to residents under the umbrella of the Cresskill Fire Department, providing 24/7 EMS service with paid per-diem staff.

The Cresskill Police Department is made up of 22 police officers, complemented by Class I Special Police Officer's. The Police Department is open 24/7, and is located at 67 Union Avenue, in the rear of Borough Hall.

=== Federal, state, and county representation ===
Cresskill is located in the 5th Congressional District and is part of New Jersey's 39th state legislative district.

For the 119th United States Congress, New Jersey's 5th congressional district is represented by Josh Gottheimer (D, Wyckoff). New Jersey is represented in the United States Senate by Democrats Cory Booker (Newark, term ends 2027) and Andy Kim (Moorestown, term ends 2031).

For the 2026–2027 session, the 39th legislative district of the New Jersey Legislature is represented in the State Senate by Holly Schepisi (R, River Vale) and in the General Assembly by Robert Auth (R, Old Tappan) and John V. Azzariti (R, Saddle River).

Bergen County is governed by a directly elected County Executive, with legislative functions performed by a Board of County Commissioners comprised of seven members who are elected at-large to three-year terms in partisan elections on a staggered basis, with either two or three seats coming up for election each November; a Chairman and Vice Chairman are selected from among its seven members at a reorganization meeting held every January. As of 2025, the county executive is James J. Tedesco III (D, Paramus), whose four-year term of office ends December 31, 2026.

Bergen County's Commissioners are Chair Mary J. Amoroso (D, Mahwah, 2025), Vice Chair Steven A. Tanelli (D, North Arlington, 2027), Chair Pro Tem Joan Voss (D, Fort Lee, 2026), Rafael Marte (D, Bergenfield, 2026), Germaine M. Ortiz (D, Emerson, 2025), Thomas J. Sullivan Jr. (D, Montvale, 2025) and Tracy Silna Zur (D, Franklin Lakes, 2027).

Bergen County's elected constitutional officials are Clerk John S. Hogan (D, Northvale, 2026), Sheriff Anthony Cureton (D, Englewood, 2027) and Surrogate Michael R. Dressler (D, Cresskill, 2026).

=== Politics ===
United States presidential election results for Cresskill 2024 2020 2016 2012 2008 2004
Year	Republican		Democratic		Third party(ies)	
Year	No.	%	No.	%	No.	%
2024	1,986	47.67%	2,122	50.94%	58	1.39%
2020	1,904	41.34%	2,660	57.75%	42	0.91%
2016	1,689	43.29%	2,086	53.46%	127	3.25%
2012	1,805	50.08%	1,777	49.31%	22	0.61%
2008	1,913	48.74%	1,989	50.68%	23	0.59%
2004	1,886	50.62%	1,813	48.66%	27	0.72%

As of March 2011, there were a total of 4,904 registered voters in Cresskill, of which 1,263 (25.8% vs. 31.7% countywide) were registered as Democrats, 1,234 (25.2% vs. 21.1%) were registered as Republicans and 2,403 (49.0% vs. 47.1%) were registered as Unaffiliated. There were 4 voters registered as Libertarians or Greens. Among the borough's 2010 Census population, 57.2% (vs. 57.1% in Bergen County) were registered to vote, including 78.1% of those ages 18 and over (vs. 73.7% countywide).

In the 2016 presidential election, Democrat Hillary Clinton received 2,086 votes (52.8% vs. 54.2% countywide), ahead of Republican Donald Trump with 1,689 votes (42.7% vs. 41.1% countywide) and other candidates with 127 votes (3.2% vs 3.0% countywide), among the 3,953 ballots cast by the borough's 5,467 registered voters for a turnout of 72.3% (vs. 73% in Bergen County). In the 2012 presidential election, Republican Mitt Romney received 1,805 votes (49.7% vs. 43.5% countywide), ahead of Democrat Barack Obama with 1,777 votes (48.9% vs. 54.8%) and other candidates with 22 votes (0.6% vs. 0.9%), among the 3,634 ballots cast by the borough's 5,163 registered voters, for a turnout of 70.4% (vs. 70.4% in Bergen County). In the 2008 presidential election, Democrat Barack Obama received 1,989 votes (50.4% vs. 53.9% countywide), ahead of Republican John McCain with 1,913 votes (48.5% vs. 44.5%) and other candidates with 23 votes (0.6% vs. 0.8%), among the 3,944 ballots cast by the borough's 5,074 registered voters, for a turnout of 77.7% (vs. 76.8% in Bergen County). In the 2004 presidential election, Republican George W. Bush received 1,886 votes (50.5% vs. 47.2% countywide), ahead of Democrat John Kerry with 1,813 votes (48.5% vs. 51.7%) and other candidates with 27 votes (0.7% vs. 0.7%), among the 3,738 ballots cast by the borough's 4,748 registered voters, for a turnout of 78.7% (vs. 76.9% in the whole county).

Gubernatorial election results for Cresskill
Year	Republican		Democratic		Third party(ies)	
Year	No.	%	No.	%	No.	%
2025	1,195	48.88%	1,245	50.92%	5	0.20%
2021	1,181	49.00%	1,220	50.62%	9	0.37%
2017	833	44.86%	1,001	53.90%	23	1.24%
2013	1,312	62.57%	766	36.53%	19	0.91%
2009	1,213	50.00%	1,106	45.59%	107	4.41%
2005	990	47.26%	1,056	50.41%	49	2.34%

In the 2013 gubernatorial election, Republican Chris Christie received 64.3% of the vote (1,412 cast), ahead of Democrat Barbara Buono with 34.9% (766 votes), and other candidates with 0.9% (19 votes), among the 2,259 ballots cast by the borough's 4,949 registered voters (62 ballots were spoiled), for a turnout of 45.6%. In the 2009 gubernatorial election, Republican Chris Christie received 1,213 votes (49.5% vs. 45.8% countywide), ahead of Democrat Jon Corzine with 1,106 votes (45.2% vs. 48.0%), Independent Chris Daggett with 99 votes (4.0% vs. 4.7%) and other candidates with 8 votes (0.3% vs. 0.5%), among the 2,449 ballots cast by the borough's 4,975 registered voters, yielding a 49.2% turnout (vs. 50.0% in the county).

United States Senate election results for Cresskill1
Year	Republican		Democratic		Third party(ies)	
Year	No.	%	No.	%	No.	%
2024	1,730	44.51%	2,090	53.77%	67	1.72%
2018	1,376	48.38%	1,416	49.79%	52	1.83%
2012	1,526	46.74%	1,689	51.73%	50	1.53%
2006	1,211	50.33%	1,165	48.42%	30	1.25%

United States Senate election results for Cresskill2
Year	Republican		Democratic		Third party(ies)	
Year	No.	%	No.	%	No.	%
2020	1,872	41.79%	2,560	57.14%	48	1.07%
2014	926	47.86%	982	50.75%	27	1.40%
2013	623	45.47%	739	53.94%	8	0.58%
2008	1,659	46.59%	1,863	52.32%	39	1.10%

== Education ==
The Cresskill Public Schools serve students in pre-kindergarten through twelfth grade The district is governed by a board of education and administered by a superintendent of schools, a school business administrator / board secretary, and principals, as part of the district's staff of more than 320 employees. Schools in the district (with 2022–23 enrollment data from the National Center for Education Statistics) are Edward H. Bryan School with 531 students grades PreK-5, Merritt Memorial School with 276 students in grades PreK-5 and Cresskill Middle School / Cresskill High School with 398 students in middle school for grades 6-8 and 474 in high school for grades 9-12.

Public school students from the borough, and all of Bergen County, are eligible to attend the secondary education programs offered by the Bergen County Technical Schools, which include the Bergen County Academies in Hackensack, and the Bergen Tech campus in Teterboro or Paramus. The district offers programs on a shared-time or full-time basis, with admission based on a selective application process and tuition covered by the student's home school district.

Despite efforts by parents, the Academy of Saint Therese of Lisieux, which opened in 1957, was shuttered by the Roman Catholic Archdiocese of Newark at the end of the 2019–20 school year, in the wake of declining enrollment and an unsustainable subsidy from the diocese of more than $300,000 per year.

== Transportation ==
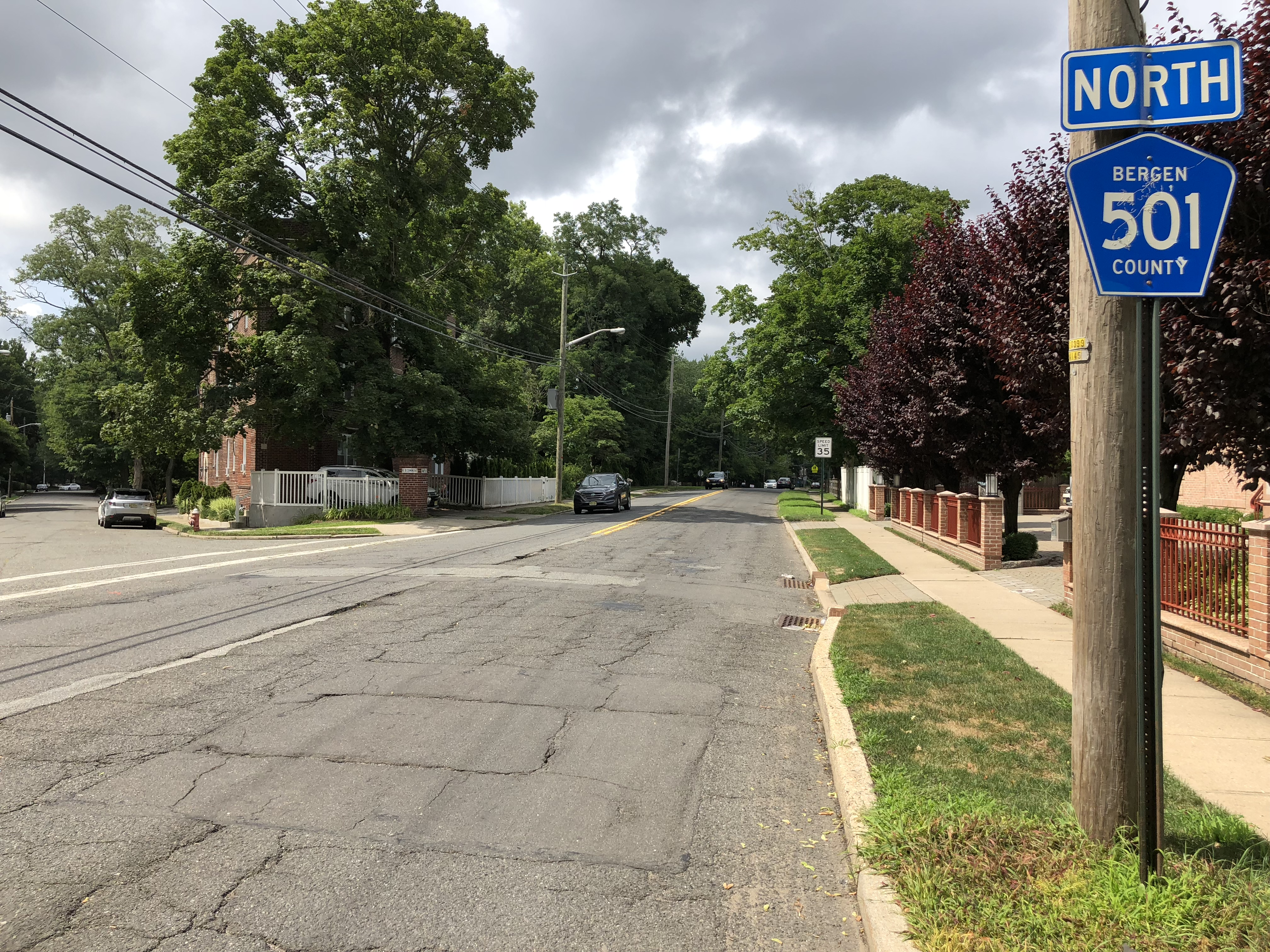
County Route 501 northbound in Cresskill

=== Roads and highways ===
As of May 2010, the borough had a total of 37.02 miles (59.58 km) of roadways, of which 33.65 miles (54.15 km) were maintained by the municipality and 3.37 miles (5.42 km) by Bergen County.

County Route 505 and County Route 501 travel through Cresskill.

=== Public transportation ===
The NJ Transit 166 bus route provides service to the Port Authority Bus Terminal in Midtown Manhattan, and local service is available on the 753 route.

Bus service to Rockland County and the Port Authority Bus Terminal in NYC is also provided by Rockland Coaches route 20/20T.

== Notable people ==
People who were born in, residents of, or otherwise closely associated with Cresskill include:

- Roger Ailes (1940–2017), television executive who was the chairman and CEO of Fox News and Fox Television Stations
- Joe Azelby (born 1962), professional football player who played for the Buffalo Bills, businessman and author
- Mary J. Blige (born 1971), R&B singer
- David Broza (born 1955), Israeli singer-songwriter
- Rick Cerone (born 1954), former catcher for the New York Yankees
- Lynn Chen (born 1976), actress, who has appeared on All My Children
- Halim El-Dabh (1921–2017), Egyptian-born composer who made Cresskill his home in the early 1960s
- Stephen Dadaian (born 1987), electric and classical guitarist
- Johnny Damon (born 1973), former left fielder for the New York Yankees
- Bobby Hebb (1938–2010), R&B and soul singer, musician, songwriter, recording artist, and performer known for his 1966 hit "Sunny"
- Marvin Kaplan, lawyer and government official who serves as the chairman of the National Labor Relations Board
- Michael Kempner (born 1958), founder, president, and CEO of the public relations firm MWW
- Andrew M. Luger (born 1959), attorney who served as the United States Attorney for the District of Minnesota from 2014 to 2017
- Betsy Markey (born 1956), member of the U.S. House of Representatives from Colorado
- Harold Martin (1918–2010), member of the New Jersey General Assembly
- Reuben (1912–1994) and Rose (1916–2006) Mattus, entrepreneurs and philanthropists who founded the Häagen-Dazs ice cream business
- Pierre McGuire (born 1961), ice hockey analyst and former NHL coach and scout
- May McNeer (1902–1994), journalist and author
- Robert Bruce Merrifield (1921–2006), biochemist and winner of 1984 Nobel Prize in Chemistry
- Sherrill Milnes (born 1935), operatic baritone
- Tracy Morgan (born 1968), actor and comedian best known for his eight seasons as a cast member on Saturday Night Live and for his role as Tracy Jordan on the TV series 30 Rock
- Nicholas Oresko (1917–2013), United States Army veteran who was awarded the Medal of Honor for his actions on January 23, 1945, during World War II
- Mike Piazza (born 1968), former catcher for the New York Mets
- John Ricco (born c. 1968), assistant general manager of the New York Mets
- Tom Rinaldi, reporter for ESPN and ABC
- Ani Sarkisian (born 1995), footballer who plays as a forward for the Armenia women's national team
- Tommy Savas (born 1984), actor and producer
- Richard H. Tedford (c. 1928–2011), paleontologist
- Lynd Ward (1905–1985), artist and storyteller, known for his series of wordless novels using wood engraving
- Gary Wright (1943-2023), singer best known for his song "Dream Weaver"
- Robert Zoellner (1932–2014), investor and stamp collector who was the second person to have assembled a complete collection of United States postage stamps

== Sources ==
- Clayton, W. Woodford; and Nelson, William. History of Bergen and Passaic Counties, New Jersey, with Biographical Sketches of Many of its Pioneers and Prominent Men., Philadelphia: Everts and Peck, 1882.
- Harvey, Cornelius Burnham (ed.), Genealogical History of Hudson and Bergen Counties, New Jersey. New York: New Jersey Genealogical Publishing Co., 1900.
- Van Valen, James M. History of Bergen County, New Jersey. New York: New Jersey Publishing and Engraving Co., 1900.
- Westervelt, Frances A. (Frances Augusta), 1858–1942, History of Bergen County, New Jersey, 1630–1923, Lewis Historical Publishing Company, 1923.
- Municipal Incorporations of the State of New Jersey (according to Counties) prepared by the Division of Local Government, Department of the Treasury (New Jersey); December 1, 1958.
