= Arkansas Highway 54 =

State highway in Arkansas, United States

Highway 54
- Segments of Highway 54 in red

Route information
- Maintained by ArDOT
- Existed: April 1, 1926–present

Section 1
- Length: 28.80 mi (46.35 km)
- East end: US 65 / US 165 in Dumas
- West end: US 425 / AR 11 near Star City

Section 2
- Length: 52.65 mi (84.73 km)
- East end: AR 114 near Palmyra
- West end: End state maintenance at CR 18

Location
- Country: United States
- State: Arkansas
- Counties: Desha, Lincoln, Cleveland, Jefferson

Highway system
- Arkansas Highway System; Interstate; US; State; Business; Spurs; Suffixed; Scenic; Heritage
← AR 53	→ I-55

Highway 54 (AR 54, Ark. 54, and Hwy. 54) is a designation for two state highways in Southeast Arkansas. One route of 28.80 miles (46.35 km) begins at US 65/US 165 in Dumas and runs west to US 425/Highway 11. (Note: Although Arkansas highways normally run from south to north and from west to east, the Route Log Database indicates that Highway 54 begins in Dumas and runs west.) A second route of 52.65 miles (84.73 km) begins at Highway 114 and runs west to County Road 18 at the Grant/Jefferson county line. Both routes are maintained by the Arkansas Department of Transportation (ARDOT).

== Route description ==
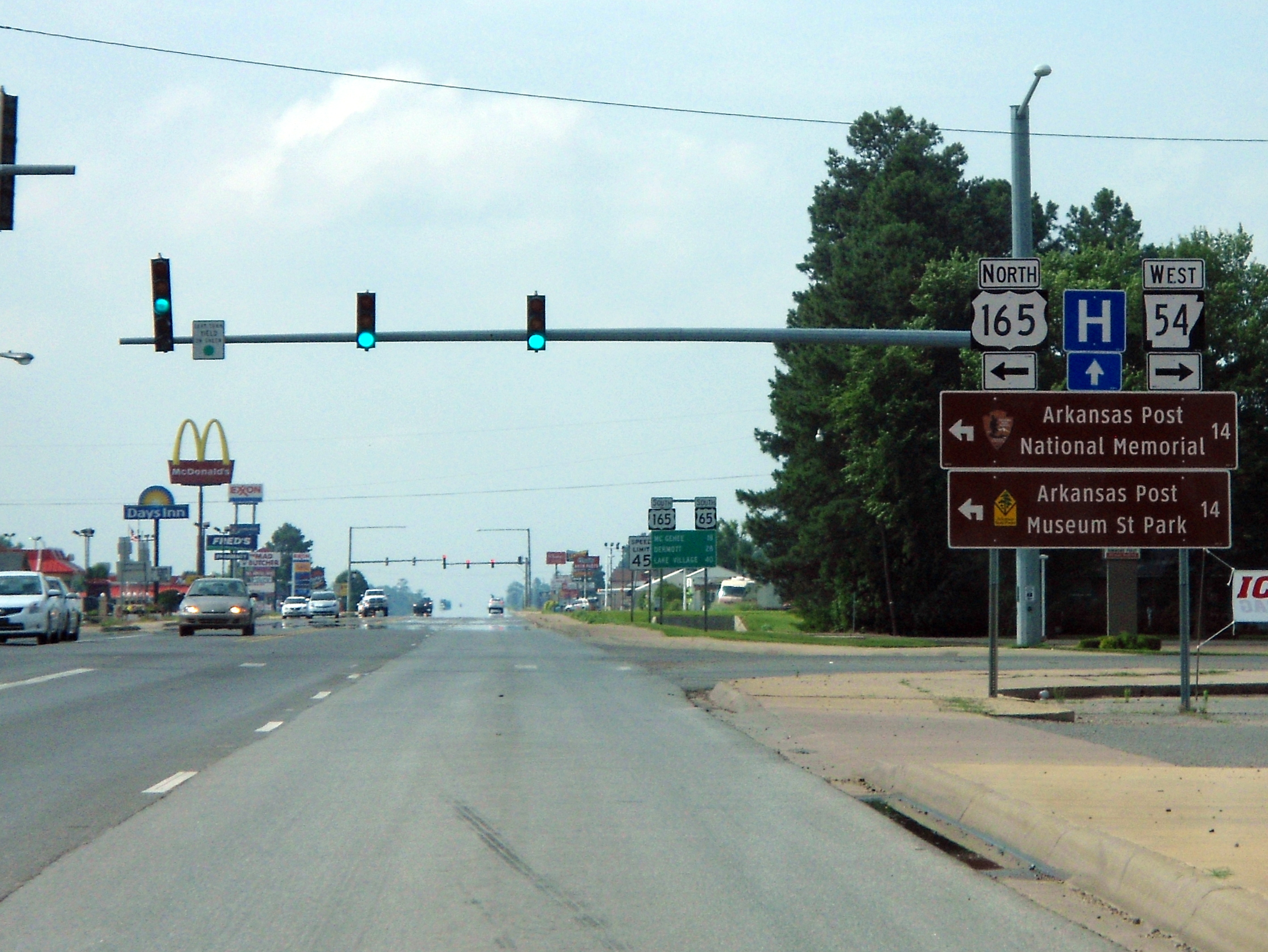
Highway 54 eastern terminus in Dumas

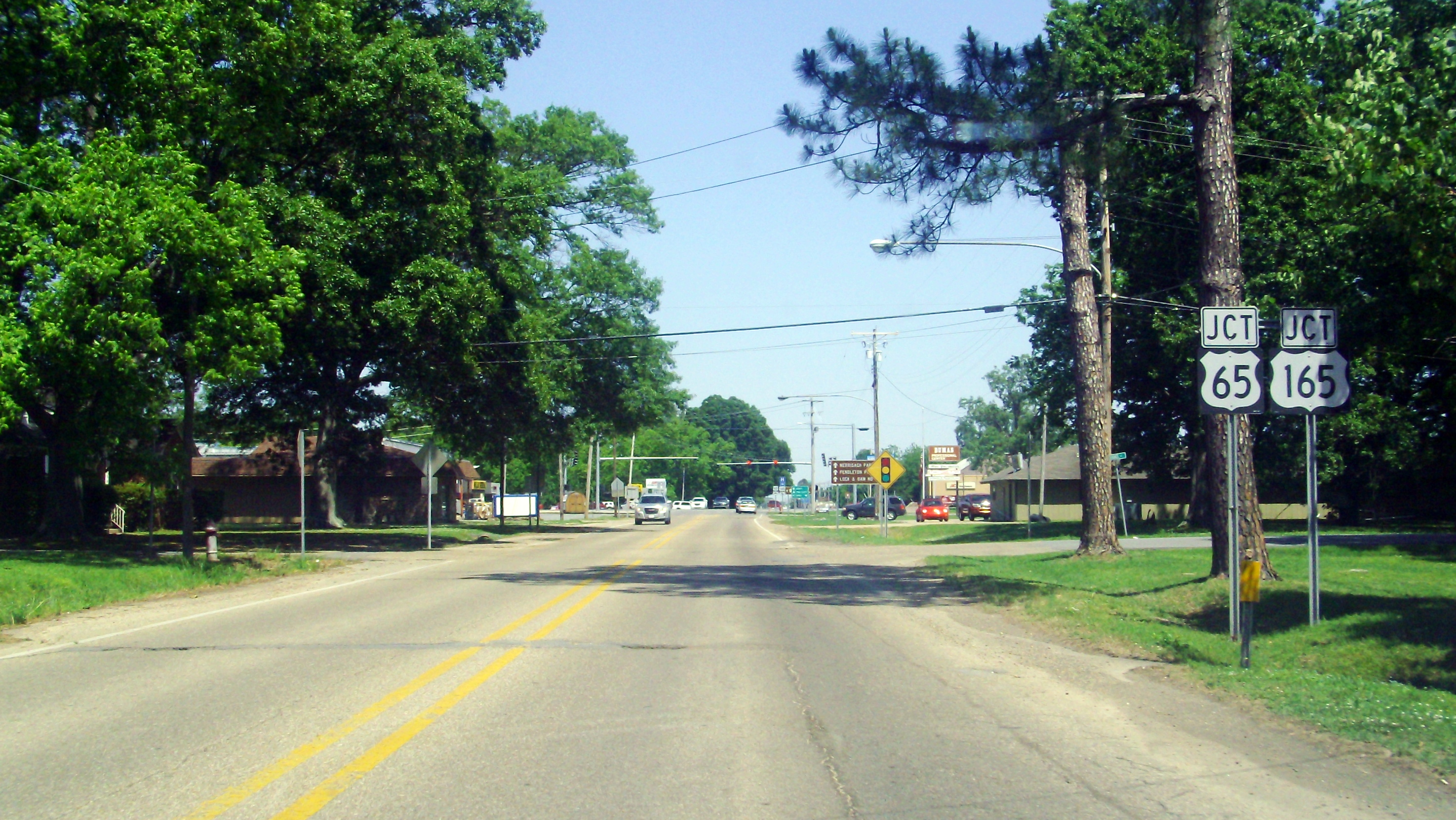
Highway 54 approaching US 65/US 165 in Dumas

== History ==
Highway 54 was created on April 1, 1926 as one of the original state highways. The route ran east from US 65 in Dumas to State Road 1 entirely within Desha County. It was extended west to Garrett Bridge in 1937, supplanting a Highway 140 designation. The route was extended west to Little Garnett in July 1957 and Star City in June 1960.

The second route was created in April 1963, beginning at Highway 114 and running north to Highway 15 (present-day US 63) in Jefferson County. The route was extended north and west to the Grant County line in November 1966. Though the Arkansas State Highway Commission authorized an extension to Highway 35 at Grapevine, Grant County never satisfied the conditions necessary for extension and rescinded approval in January 1982.

The original section of Highway 54 was supplanted in March 1981 between Dumas and Highway 1 by an extended US 165.

== Major intersections ==
County	Location	mi	km	Destinations	Notes
Desha	Dumas	0.00	0.00	US 65 / US 165 – DeWitt, Pine Bluff, McGehee, Arkansas Post National Memorial	Eastern terminus
Desha	Dumas	0.69	1.11	AR 159 north (Main Street) – Monticello	AR 159 southern terminus
Desha		2.07	3.33	AR 980 – Billy Free Municipal Airport	Northern terminus
Lincoln		5.62	9.04	AR 83 north	Begin AR 83 overlap
Lincoln		8.52– 9.77	13.71– 15.72	AR 293 – Sedgwick	
Lincoln		19.62	31.58	AR 83 south – Monticello	End AR 83 overlap
Lincoln		28.80	46.35	US 425 / AR 11 – Star City, Monticello	Western terminus
Lincoln	Gap in route				
Lincoln		0.00	0.00	AR 114 – Star City, Calmer	Eastern terminus
Lincoln		1.55	2.49	AR 212 east – Star City	AR 212 western terminus
Cleveland	No major junctions				
Jefferson		11.18– 0.00	17.99– 0.00	US 63 – Pine Bluff, Warren	
Jefferson		4.83	7.77	AR 133 south – Rison	AR 133 northern terminus
Jefferson		9.59– 0.00	15.43– 0.00	US 79 – Rison, Pine Bluff	
Jefferson–Grant county line		10.40	16.74	End state maintenance, continues as CR 18	Western terminus
1.000 mi = 1.609 km; 1.000 km = 0.621 mi: Concurrency terminus
