= Arkansas Highway 189 =

State highway designation in Arkansas, United States

Highway 189

Route information
- Maintained by ArDOT

Section 1
- Length: 0.9 mi (1,400 m)
- West end: CR 19 in Hamburg
- East end: US 82 / US 425 in Hamburg

Section 2
- Length: 9.9 mi (15.9 km)
- South end: US 82 / US 425 / AR 8 in Hamburg
- North end: AR 133 near Milo

Section 3
- Length: 3.8 mi (6.1 km)
- South end: US 278 in Warren
- North end: US 63 / US 63B near Warren

Section 4
- Length: 23.8 mi (38.3 km)
- South end: AR 8 near Orlando
- North end: Pump Station Road

Location
- Country: United States
- State: Arkansas
- Counties: Ashley, Bradley, Cleveland

Highway system
- Arkansas Highway System; Interstate; US; State; Business; Spurs; Suffixed; Scenic; Heritage
← AR 188	→ AR 190

Arkansas Highway 189 (AR 189, Ark. 189, and Hwy. 189) is the designation for a state highway in the U.S. state of Arkansas. The route is split into four sections, all of which are located in southeast Arkansas. The first section is a very short highway that begins at US Highway 425 (US 425) in Hamburg and travels to the Ashley County Fairgrounds just south of Hamburg. The second section begins at US 425, US 82 and AR 8 in Hamburg and ends at AR 133 near the unincorporated community of Milo, or about six miles (9.7 km) southwest of Fountain Hill. The third section begins at US 278 in Warren and ends at US 63 in Warren. The fourth and longest section begins at AR 8 near the unincorporated community of Orlando, or about five miles (8.0 km) northwest of Warren and ends at Pump Station Road in rural Cleveland County.

== Route description ==
=== Section 1 ===
The first section of AR 189 begins at US 425 in Hamburg, and runs from east to west, rather than north to south. The route heads directly towards the west before reaching its western terminus at the Ashley County Fairgrounds just south of Hamburg. The route is very short, only about 0.9 miles (1.4 km) long.

=== Section 2 ===
The second section of AR 189 begins at US 425, US 82, and AR 8 in Hamburg. The route heads west and eventually towards the northwest before reaching its northern terminus at AR 133 near Milo. The route is about 9.9 miles (15.9 km) and does not intersect any other highways or communities.

=== Section 3 ===
The third section of AR 189 begins at US 278 in Warren. The route heads towards the northwest for about 3.8 miles (6.1 km) before reaching its northern terminus at US 63 just north of Warren. The route is a bypass around the city of Warren and does not intersect any other highways or communities.

=== Section 4 ===
The fourth and longest section of AR 189 begins at AR 8 near Orlando. The route travels north for about 18 miles (29 km) before running concurrently with AR 97 for about 0.5 miles (0.80 km) through the town of Kingsland. The route intersects US 79 shortly after and continues to head northwest before reaching its northern terminus at Pump Station Road in rural Cleveland County. The route is about 23.8 miles (38.3 km) long.

== Major intersections ==
County	Location	mi	km	Destinations	Notes
Ashley	Hamburg	0.0	0.0	US 425 / US 82 – Hamburg, Crossett, Monticello	Eastern terminus
Ashley	Hamburg	0.9	1.4	CR 19, Ashley County Fairgrounds	Northern terminus
Gap in route
Ashley	Hamburg	0.0	0.0	US 425 / US 82 / AR 8 – Hamburg, Lake Village	Southern terminus
Ashley	Milo	9.9	15.9	AR 133 – Crossett, Fountain Hill	
Gap in route
Bradley	Warren	0.0	0.0	US 278 – Warren, Monticello, Hampton	Southern terminus
Bradley	Warren	3.8	6.1	US 63 / US 63B south (Myrtle Street) – Pine Bluff, El Dorado	Northern terminus, US 63B northern terminus
Gap in route
Bradley	Orlando	0.0	0.0	AR 8 – Warren, Fordyce	Southern terminus
Cleveland	Kingsland	18.0	29.0	AR 97 south – Marks' Mills State Park	South end of AR 97 concurrency
Cleveland	Kingsland	18.5	29.8	AR 97 – Kingsland	North end of AR 97 concurrency
Cleveland	Kingsland	19.2	30.9	US 79 – Fordyce, Rison, Pine Bluff	
Cleveland		23.8	38.3	Pump Station Road	Northern terminus
1.000 mi = 1.609 km; 1.000 km = 0.621 mi
