= Arkansas Highway 97 =

State highway in Arkansas, United States

Highway 97

Route information
- Maintained by ArDOT
- Length: 6.45 mi (10.38 km)
- Existed: c. 1939-1940–present

Major junctions
- South end: AR 8 at Marks' Mills State Park
- North end: US 79 in Kingsland

Location
- Country: United States
- State: Arkansas
- Counties: Cleveland

Highway system
- Arkansas Highway System; Interstate; US; State; Business; Spurs; Suffixed; Scenic; Heritage
← AR 96	→ AR 98

Highway 97 (AR 97, Ark. 97, and Hwy. 97) is a north–south state highway in Cleveland County. The route of 6.45 miles (10.38 km) begins at Highway 8 and runs northwest to US Highway 79 (US 79) in Kingsland. The route is maintained by the Arkansas State Highway and Transportation Department (AHTD).

== Route description ==
The highway begins at Highway 8 in the southwest corner of Cleveland County near New Edinburg at Marks' Mills State Park and a National Historic Landmark. Highway 97 runs northwest toward Kingsland, beginning a concurrency with Highway 189 just south of the city. Once inside the city limits, Highway 189 turns left at 1st Street, ending the concurrency. Highway 97 continues along 1st Street and 3rd Street eastward to a junction with US 79, where it terminates.

== History ==
The original Highway 97 was created in the 1926 renumbering from Highway 91 in Walnut Ridge to US 63. In 1929, Highway 91 was realigned, replacing Highway 97. The current Highway 97 was added to the state highway system by the Arkansas State Highway Commission between 1939 and 1940 following the completion of a new terrain Highway 8 between New Edinburg and Fordyce. Following completion, the old Highway 8 routing to Kingston was redesignated as Highway 97.

== Major intersections ==
The entire route is in Cleveland County.

Location	mi	km	Destinations	Notes
	0.00	0.00	AR 8 – Warren, Fordyce	Southern terminus
	5.4	8.7	AR 189 south – Warren	Begin AR 189 overlap
Kingsland	5.9	9.5	AR 189 north (1st St)	End AR 189 overlap
Kingsland	6.45	10.38	US 79 – Rison, Fordyce	Northern terminus
1.000 mi = 1.609 km; 1.000 km = 0.621 mi

== Former route ==
State Road 97
- Location: Lawrence County
- Existed: April 1, 1926–c. September 1, 1928

State Road 97 is a former state highway in Lawrence County.

=== History ===
State Road 97 was created during the 1926 Arkansas state highway numbering as a connector route between State Road 91 and US 79 near Walnut Ridge. The route was deleted from the state highway system by September 1, 1928. The road was brought back into the state highway system by October 1, 1928, but was deleted from the state highway system again by 1929.v This route was eventually supplanted by Highway 91, which switched to the present-day alignment following completion of a new terrain US 63 between Bono and Walnut Ridge.

=== Major intersections ===
The entire route was in Lawrence County.

Location	mi	km	Destinations	Notes
	0	0.0	US 63 – Hoxie, Jonesboro	Southern terminus
	2	3.2	AR 91 – Walnut Ridge	Northern terminus
1.000 mi = 1.609 km; 1.000 km = 0.621 mi
