= New Edinburg, Arkansas =

- Census-designated place
- Location of New Edinburg in Cleveland County, Arkansas.

- Location within Arkansas
- Coordinates: 33°45′12″N 92°14′55″W
- Country: United States
- State: Arkansas
- County: Cleveland

Area
  - Total: 3.20 sq mi (8.30 km^{2})
  - Land: 3.20 sq mi (8.30 km^{2})
  - Water: 0 sq mi (0.00 km^{2})
- Elevation: 289 ft (88 m)

Population (2020)
  - Total: 134
  - Density: 41.8/sq mi (16.15/km^{2})
- Time zone: UTC-6 (Central (CST))
  - Summer (DST): UTC-5 (CDT)
- Postal code: 71660
- Area code: 870
- GNIS feature ID: 2582920

New Edinburg is an unincorporated census-designated place in Cleveland County, Arkansas, United States. Per the 2020 census, its population was 134.

== Geography ==
New Edinburg is located in southwestern Cleveland County. Arkansas Highway 8 passes through the community, leading northwest 11 miles (18 km) to Fordyce and southeast 15 miles (24 km) to Warren. Rison, the county seat, is 18 miles (29 km) north via Highways 8, 97, and 79.

== Demographics ==
Historical population
Census	Pop.	Note	%±
2010	127		—
2020	134		5.5%
U.S. Decennial Census; 2010 2020

New Edinburg first appeared as a census designated place in the 2010 U.S. census.

=== 2020 census ===
New Edinburg CDP, Arkansas – Racial and ethnic composition Note: the US Census treats Hispanic/Latino as an ethnic category. This table excludes Latinos from the racial categories and assigns them to a separate category. Hispanics/Latinos may be of any race.
Race / Ethnicity (NH = Non-Hispanic)	Pop 2010	Pop 2020	% 2010	% 2020
White alone (NH)	103	105	81.10%	78.36%
Black or African American alone (NH)	17	19	13.39%	14.18%
Native American or Alaska Native alone (NH)	0	0	0.00%	0.00%
Asian alone (NH)	0	0	0.00%	0.00%
Pacific Islander alone (NH)	0	0	0.00%	0.00%
Some other race alone (NH)	0	0	0.00%	0.00%
Mixed or multiracial (NH)	0	5	0.00%	3.73%
Hispanic or Latino (any race)	7	5	5.51%	3.73%
Total	127	134	100.00%	100.00%

== History ==
At the time the first Toledo courthouse burned down in 1889, New Edinburg had a population of 200. The unincorporated area was in the running to receive the county seat, along with Rison, Kingsland, and Beasley's Switch. None of the towns managed to get a majority vote, so a second election was held. Rison won the county seat and it remains the seat today.

According to Arkansas Preservation, in the late 1800s, W. D. Attwood built a Queen Anne Classic-style residence in New Edinburg. Attwood was a town merchant and built the first brick store, the Attwood Mercantile Store. The location of Attwood's store is now the home of McClellan's Country Store, the only mercantile establishment in New Edinburg. In 1917, Emmett Moseley altered Attwood's house to its current appearance. The building is still a private residence, and in 1994 it was added to the National Register of Historic Places.

New Edinburg is the location of, or the nearest community to, three historic sites listed on the National Register of Historic Places:

- Attwood-Hopson House, on the north side of Arkansas Highway 8
- Barnett-Attwood House, northeast of New Edinburg
- New Edinburg Commercial Historic District, on Arkansas Highway 8

== In popular culture ==
In the fall of 2011, part of the feature film Come Morning was filmed in New Edinburg. According to IMDb, Come Morning is the only production to have ever filmed there.

== Education ==
The area is within the Cleveland County School District.

On July 1, 1985, the New Edinburg School District consolidated into the Kingsland School District. On July 1, 2004, the school district consolidated with the Rison School District to form the Cleveland County School District.
