= Arkansas Highway 114 =

State highway in Lower Arkansas

Highway 114

Route information
- Maintained by ArDOT
- Existed: April 1, 1926–present

Section 1
- Length: 28.66 mi (46.12 km)
- West end: AR 35 near Toledo
- Major intersections: US 63 in Calmer
- East end: US 65 in Gould

Location
- Country: United States
- State: Arkansas
- Counties: Cleveland, Lincoln

Highway system
- Arkansas Highway System; Interstate; US; State; Business; Spurs; Suffixed; Scenic; Heritage
← AR 113	→ AR 115

Highway 114 (AR 114, Ark. 114, and Hwy. 114) is a state highway in the Lower Arkansas Delta. The route of 28.66 miles (46.12 km) runs from Highway 35 to US Highway 65 (US 65) in Gould. The route is maintained by the Arkansas Department of Transportation (ArDOT).

== Route description ==
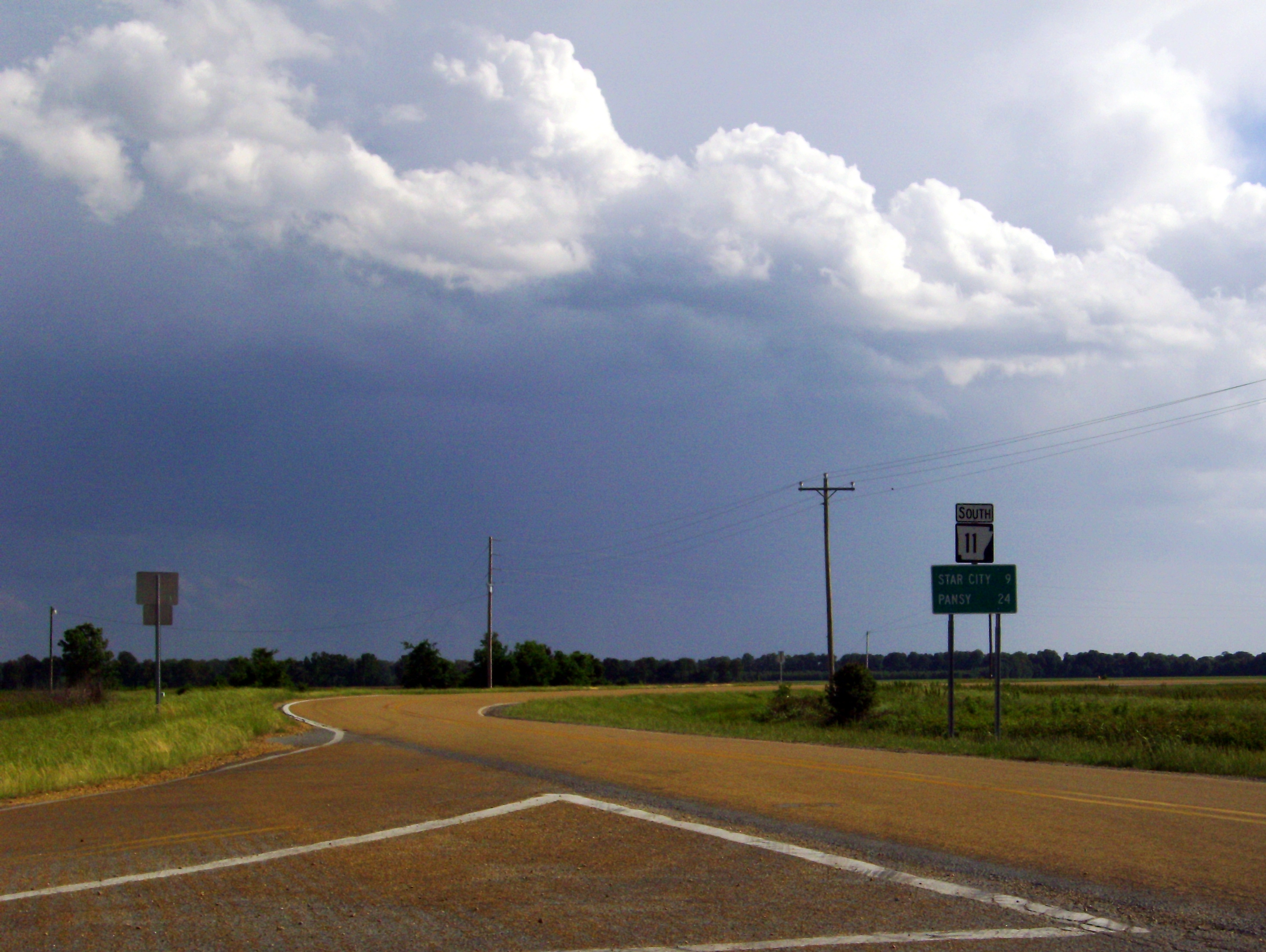
Highway 11 and Highway 114 east of Star City (Highway 114 is unsigned)

The highway begins in Cleveland County south of Rison at Highway 35. The route runs east to Calmer, where it has a brief officially designated exception with US 63 before entering Lincoln County.

In Lincoln County, Highway 114 has a junction with Highway 54 and Highway 530 before entering Star City. Highway 530 is a two-lane expressway planned as a future extension of Interstate 530 (I-530) south to a future I-69. The route enters Star City, intersecting Highway 11 Business (AR 11B) and forming a concurrency through the city. Highway 11B terminates at Highway 11, and Highway 11/Highway 114 continue to concur heading east to intersect US 425. The pair of routes remain concurrent to the east until Fresno, when Highway 114 turns east toward Gould. In Gould, Highway 114 intersects US 65, where it terminates.

== History ==
Highway 114 was created on April 1, 1926 as one of the original state highways. The route ran east from State Road 11 at Fresno through Gould to Douglas. A second route was created in Cleveland County between Highway 35 and Calmer in July 1957. The gap between Calmer and Star City was closed in March 1962. Within Star City, Highway 114 was rerouted from Bradley Street to Arkansas Avenue upon completion of a widening project in 1967. In 2015, the section between US 65 and Douglas was removed from the state highway system.

== Major intersections ==
County	Location	mi	km	Destinations	Notes
Cleveland		0.00	0.00	AR 35 – Rison, Pansy	Western terminus
Cleveland	Calmer	8.36– 8.39	13.45– 13.50	US 63 – Warren, Pine Bluff	Officially designated exception
Lincoln		12.94	20.82	AR 54 west – Pine Bluff	AR 54 eastern terminus
Lincoln		17.05	27.44	AR 530 – Pine Bluff	Future I-530
Lincoln	Star City	19.54	31.45	AR 212 west – Glendale	AR 212 eastern terminus
Lincoln	Star City	19.74	31.77	AR 11B	Begin AR 11B/AR 11 concurrency
Lincoln	Fresno	0.00	0.00	AR 11 north	End AR 11 concurrency
Lincoln		7.34	11.81	AR 83 south	AR 83 northern terminus
Lincoln	Gould	8.92	14.36	US 65 – Dumas, Pine Bluff	Eastern terminus
1.000 mi = 1.609 km; 1.000 km = 0.621 mi: Concurrency terminus
