= Arkansas Highway 35 =

State highway in Arkansas, United States

Highway 35

Route information
- Maintained by ArDOT
- Existed: 1926–present

Section 1
- Length: 36.4 mi (58.6 km)
- South end: Macon Lake Road at Dewey
- Major intersections: US 65 / US 278 at Halley Junction; US 165 in Dermott
- North end: US 278 in Monticello

Section 2
- Length: 55.9 mi (90.0 km)
- South end: US 425 near Monticello
- Major intersections: US 63 from Rye to Pansy; US 79 in Rison
- North end: US 167 at Cross Roads

Section 3
- Length: 23.8 mi (38.3 km)
- South end: US 167B in Sheridan
- Major intersections: AR 190 near Shaw; AR 183 in Benton; AR 88 in Benton
- North end: I-30 / US 67 / US 70 / AR 5 in Benton

Location
- Country: United States
- State: Arkansas
- Counties: Chicot, Desha, Drew, Cleveland, Grant, Saline

Highway system
- Arkansas Highway System; Interstate; US; State; Business; Spurs; Suffixed; Scenic; Heritage
| ← AR 34 | → AR 36 |

Arkansas Highway 35 (AR 35) is a designation for three state highways in southeast Arkansas. One segment of 36.4 miles (58.6 km) runs from Macon Lake Road at Dewey north to U.S. Route 278 (US 278) in Monticello. A second segment of 55.9 miles (90.0 km) runs from US 425 north to US 167 at Cross Roads. A third segment of 23.8 miles (38.3 km) runs from US 167B in Sheridan north to Interstate 30 (I-30) in Benton.

== Route description ==
=== Dewey to Monticello ===
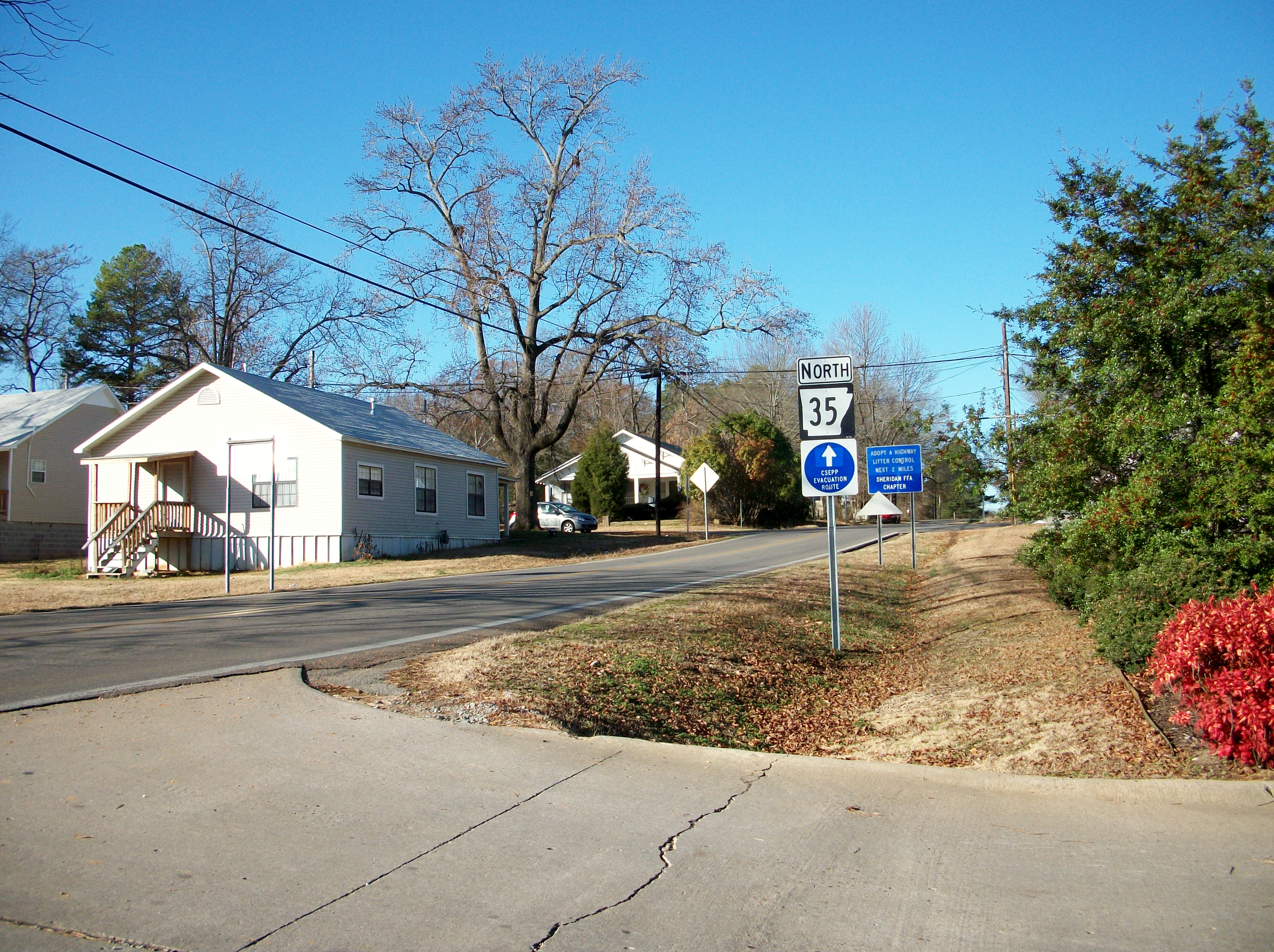
Highway 35 northbound in Sheridan.

Highway 35 begins at Macon Lake Road at Dewey near the Mississippi River. The route runs through bayous and fields in Chicot County, briefly entering Desha County for a junction with Highway 159/Highway 208 in Halley.

Returning to Chicot County, Highway 35 intersects the four-lane divided US 65/US 278 and US 165 east of Dermott, before entering the city. Highway 35 serves Dermott as Speedway Street before entering Drew County. The highway runs south of the Seven Devils Swamp WMA along the Arkansas Midland Railroad tracks until Monticello, where it terminates at US 278.

=== Monticello to Cross Roads ===
The route begins at US 425 north of Monticello and runs northwest, intersecting Highway 530. Highway 35 continues northwest to enter Cleveland County, where it forms a concurrency with US 63 from Rye to Pansy. After Pansy, the route runs northwest through Toledo to Rison, where it passes the American Legion Hut, Texaco Service Station, and Cities Service Station, each on the National Register of Historic Places. East of downtown, Highway 35 has a junction with US 79, after which the route serves the rural northwest corner of the county.

The route next enters Grant County, passing through forest/clear cut land to a rural junction with Highway 190. Highway 35 then runs west for about 3.5 miles (5.6 km) before intersecting US 167 at Cross Roads, where it terminates.

=== Sheridan to Benton ===
The route begins at US 167B in Sheridan and runs northwest, intersecting US 167 just outside the Sheridan city limits. Continuing northwest through rural country, Highway 35 enters Saline. Running past the brine springs for which the county is named, the route enters the city of Benton. In the city, Highway 35 passes near the Gann Row Historic District, the Saline County Courthouse, and the Independent Order of Odd Fellows Building, all NRHP properties. After an interchange with I-30/US 67/US 70, the route continues north to terminate at Highway 5 in north Benton.

== Major intersections ==
Mile markers reset at concurrencies.

| County | Location | mi | km | Destinations | Notes |
|---|---|---|---|---|---|
| Chicot | Dewey | 0.0 | 0.0 | Macon Lake Road | Southern terminus |
| Desha | Halley | 8.4 | 13.5 | AR 159 north / AR 208 east – Yellow Bend Port | Southern terminus of AR 159; western terminus of AR 208 |
| Chicot | Halley Junction | 11.4 | 18.3 | US 65 / US 278 – Lake Village, McGehee | |
| Chicot | Dermott | 13.3 | 21.4 | US 165 – Montrose, McGehee | |
| Chicot | Monticello | 33.3 | 53.6 | US 278 Byp. | Future I-69 |
| Drew | Monticello | 36.4 | 58.6 | US 278 – Monticello, McGehee | Northern terminus |
| Drew | Gap in route | | | | |
| Drew | | 0.0 | 0.0 | US 425 – Pine Bluff, Monticello | Southern terminus |
| Drew | | 5.2 | 8.4 | AR 530 south – Wilmar | Current northern terminus of AR 530; future I-530 |
| Cleveland | Rye | 12.7 | 20.4 | US 63 south – Warren | Southern end of US 63 concurrency |
| Cleveland | Pansy | 0.0 | 0.0 | US 63 north / AR 11 north – Pine Bluff, Star City | Northern end of US 63 concurrency; southern terminus of AR 11 |
| Cleveland | Toledo | 14.1 | 22.7 | AR 114 east – Calmer | Western terminus of AR 114 |
| Cleveland | Rison | 16.4 | 26.4 | AR 133 north (East Magnolia Street) | Southern terminus of AR 133 |
| Cleveland | Rison | 17.3 | 27.8 | US 79 – Fordyce, Pine Bluff | |
| Cleveland | Staves | 25.4 | 40.9 | AR 212 east to US 79 | Western terminus of AR 212 |
| Grant | | 39.7 | 63.9 | AR 190 east | Western terminus of AR 190 |
| Grant | Cross Roads | 43.2 | 69.5 | US 167 – Fordyce, Sheridan | Northern terminus |
| Grant | Gap in route | | | | |
| Grant | Sheridan | 0.0 | 0.0 | US 167B (Rock Street) – Little Rock, Fordyce | Southern terminus |
| Grant | | 1.9 | 3.1 | US 167 – El Dorado, Little Rock | |
| Saline | | 16.3 | 26.2 | AR 190 west – Tull | Eastern terminus of AR 190 |
| Saline | Benton | 21.4 | 34.4 | AR 183 north (Edison Avenue) – Bauxite | Southern terminus of AR 183 |
| Saline | Benton | 23.3 | 37.5 | AR 88 east (Military Road) | Western terminus of AR 88 |
| Saline | Benton | | | I-30 east (US 67 north / US 70 east) / AR 5 north – Little Rock | Interchange; exit 117 on I-30 |
| Saline | Benton | 23.8 | 38.3 | I-30 west (US 67 south / US 70 west) / AR 5 south – Texarkana | Northern terminus |
1.000 mi = 1.609 km; 1.000 km = 0.621 mi: Concurrency terminus; Unopened

== See also ==
- List of state highways in Arkansas
