= Herbine, Arkansas =

- Unincorporated community
- Location within Arkansas Location within the United States
- Coordinates: 33°49′16″N 92°2′2″W
- Country: United States
- State: Arkansas
- County: Cleveland
- Estimated Establishment: 1863 - 1870

Government
  - County Judge: Meledy Spears
  - Court Justice: Ben Curry
  - Sheriff: Jack Rodgers
  - Constable: Dave Morrison
- Elevation: 187 ft (57 m)
- Time zone: UTC-6 (Central (CST))
  - Summer (DST): UTC-5 (CDT)
- ZIP code: 71665
- Area code: 870

Herbine (Pronounced: Her-bean) is an unincorporated community in Cleveland County, Arkansas, and also serves as the township seat of Harper Township. It is the only such named place in the United States.

The education system of Herbine, Arkansas, is served by the Cleveland County School District. Fire protection for Herbine, Arkansas, is provided by the Rye Volunteer Fire Department. There is no information about the population of Herbine, Arkansas, other than local sources which estimate the population to be between 35 and 40 residents.

Herbine, Arkansas, is located in the Fourth Congressional District of Arkansas. The main economic businesses of Herbine is broiler chicken production, pine plantations, and other agricultural based business activities. Herbine, Arkansas, is an unincorporated place and may petition Cleveland County, Arkansas for incorporation up to the status of a town.

Herbine, Arkansas, is served by two churches, Free Hill Free Will Baptist Church and Bethel #2 Missionary Baptist Church, both located on Arkansas Highway 35. Herbine, Arkansas, has one cemetery, Prosperity Cemetery, which is located on Goggans Road (County Road 55).

The Crutchfield, Goggans, and Young families are among the first families to settle in the present day area of Herbine, Arkansas, and still maintain strong economic and political influences within Herbine, Arkansas, Harper Township as well as Cleveland County, Arkansas.
