= Phoenix Hotel =

Phoenix Hotel may refer to:

- Phoenix Hotel, Turku
- Phoenix Hotel (Rison, Arkansas)
- Phoenix Hotel (Waycross, Georgia)
- Phoenix Hotel (Lexington, Kentucky)
- Phoenix Hotel (Dedham, Massachusetts)

== See also ==
- Hotel Phoenix Copenhagen
