= Woodlawn School District =

School district in Arkansas, United States

Location
- Cleveland County, Arkansas; United States

District information
- Grades: K–12
- Schools: 1 elementary (K–6), 1 high (7–12)

Other information
- Website: www.whsbears.org

Woodlawn School District 6 is a public school district based in Rison, Arkansas.

The school district encompasses 102.13 square miles (264.5 km^{2}) of land along U.S. Highway 63 in Cleveland County and primarily supports the communities of Woodlawn and Rye.

All five seats on the school board are at-large positions.

== Schools ==
- Woodlawn Elementary School, serving kindergarten through grade 6.
- Woodlawn High School, serving grades 7 through 12.
