= Woodlawn High School =

Woodlawn High School may refer to:

== United States ==
- Woodlawn High School (Birmingham, Alabama)
- Woodlawn High School (Arkansas) in Rison, Arkansas
- Woodlawn High School (St. George, Louisiana)
- Woodlawn High School (Shreveport, Louisiana)
- Woodlawn High School (Baltimore) in Baltimore County, Maryland
- Woodlawn High School (Pennsylvania) in Aliquippa, Pennsylvania
- Woodlawn High School (Woodlawn, Virginia), defunct

== Canada ==
- Woodlawn High School (Nova Scotia), formerly called Prince Andrew High School until 2022

== See also ==
- H-B Woodlawn, a 6–12 public school in Arlington, Virginia
- Woodlawn School (disambiguation)
