= Rison High School =

Public school in Arkansas, United States

Location
- 700 Main Street; Rison, Arkansas 71665; United States; 33°57′15″N 92°11′17″W

Information
- School type: Public (government funded)
- Status: Open
- School district: Cleveland County School District
- NCES District ID: 0500067
- Authority: Arkansas Department of Education (ADE)
- CEEB code: 042150
- NCES School ID: 050006700951
- Teaching staff: 33.02 (on FTE basis)
- Grades: 6-12
- Enrollment: 474 (2016–17)
- Student to teacher ratio: 10.69
- Education system: ADE Smart Core curriculum
- Classes offered: Regular, Advanced Placement
- Campus type: Rural
- Colors: Black and gold
- Athletics: Football, cross country, basketball, baseball, softball, track & field, cheer
- Athletics conference: 3A Region 8 (football), 2A Region 7 (basketball)
- Mascot: Wildcat
- Team name: Rison Wildcats
- Rival: Fordyce
- Accreditation: ADE
- Communities served: Rison
- Affiliation: Arkansas Activities Association
- Website: www.rison.k12.ar.us

Rison High School (RHS) is a comprehensive public high school serving students in grades 7 through 12 in the rural community of Rison, Arkansas, United States. It is one of two public high schools in Cleveland County, and is the sole high school of the Cleveland County School District. The school's athletic teams have won 16 state championships, with eight each in football and track and field.

== History ==
RHS was a part of the Rison School District until July 1, 2004, when it consolidated with the Kingsland School District to form the Cleveland County School District.

== Academics ==
The school is accredited by the Arkansas Department of Education (ADE). The assumed course of study follows the Smart Core curriculum developed the ADE, which requires students to complete at least 24 credit units before graduation. Students engage in regular (core) and career-focus courses and exams, and may select Advanced Placement (AP) coursework and exams that may lead to college credit.

== Athletics ==
The Rison High School mascot and athletic emblem is the Wildcat, and the school colors are black and gold.

The Rison Wildcats participate in various interscholastic activities in the 3A Classification within the 3A Region 8 Conference for football and 2A Region 7 Conference for basketball as administered by the Arkansas Activities Association. The Wildcats compete in football, cross country (girls'), basketball (boys'/girls'), baseball, softball, track and field (boys'/girls'), and competitive cheer.

- Football: The Rison Wildcats have won eight state football championships (1950, 1970, 1982, 1990, 1991, 1995, 2000, 2004).
- Track and field: The boys' track team won a state track and field championship in 1970. The girls' track teams are 7-time state title holders (1979, 1980, 1981, 1986, 1987, 1983, 2002).

== Notable alumni ==
- Tyrell Johnson (2003) — NFL professional football player
- Jerry Taylor (1955) – Arkansas state legislator and businessman
