= Marks' Mills Battleground State Park =

Battlefield in Arkansas, United States

- U.S. National Register of Historic Places
- U.S. National Historic Landmark District – Contributing property
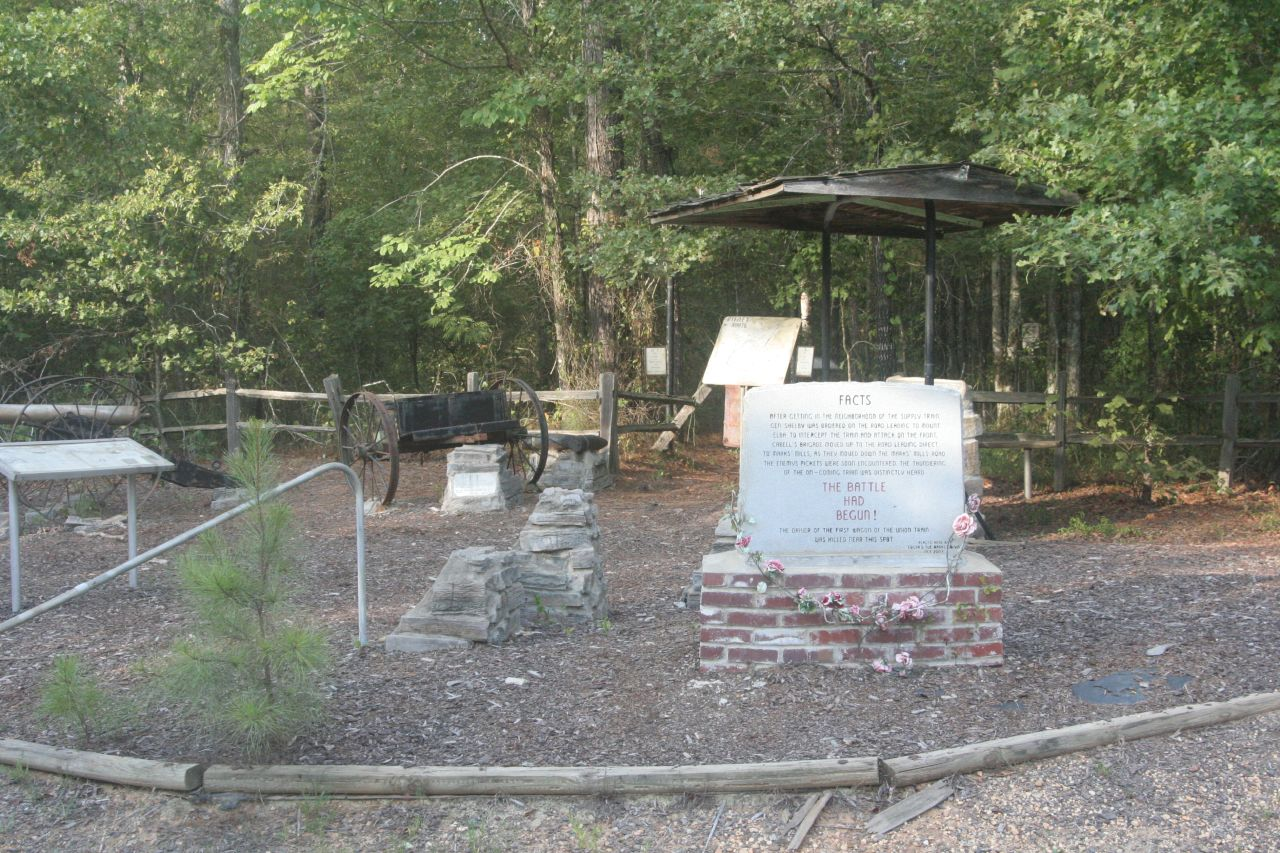

- Location within Arkansas
- Location: Cleveland County, Arkansas
- Nearest city: Fordyce, Arkansas
- Coordinates: 33°46′52.4″N 92°15′17.5″W
- Built: 1961
- Part of: Camden Expedition Sites (ID94001182)
- NRHP reference No.: 70000119

Significant dates
- Added to NRHP: January 21, 1970
- Designated NHLDCP: April 19, 1994

Marks' Mills Battleground State Park is an Arkansas State Park located at the junction of Arkansas Highway 8 and Arkansas Highway 97, north of New Edinburg, Arkansas. It preserves a portion of the battlefield of the Battle of Marks' Mills fought on April 25, 1864, in the Trans-Mississippi Theater of American Civil War. The battle was part of the Camden Expedition. The park is one of nine historic sites that make up the Camden Expedition Sites, a National Historic Landmark District. The battle was most known for the slaughter of black Union soldiers that were murdered as they tried to surrender.

== Description and administrative history ==
The roadside park is shaped in an irregular four-sided shape at the junction of the two highways. It is dotted with picnic facilities shaded by pine and oak trees, and the area is in much the same condition of dense vegetative growth that the area was described as having in 1864. There are commemorative markers on the site.

The Battle of Marks' Mills was between a column of Maj. Gen. Frederick Steele's Union Army, en route from Camden to Pine Bluff for supplies, and a Confederate force under the command of Maj. Gen. James F. Fagan that had taken up a defensive position at the road junction since the last sweep of Union reconnaissance in the area on April 21. The battle was a decisive victory for the Confederates, who captured 2,000 Union troops, four guns, and 240 empty supply wagons.

The National Historic Landmark District designation was made in 1994.

== See also ==
- List of Arkansas state parks
- List of National Historic Landmarks in Arkansas
- National Register of Historic Places listings in Cleveland County, Arkansas
