= Arkansas Highway 83 =

State highway in Arkansas, United States

Highway 83
- AR 83 in red, AR 83S in blue

Route information
- Maintained by ArDOT

Section 1
- Length: 17.1 mi (27.5 km)
- South end: University of Arkansas at Monticello east entrance
- Major intersections: US 425 in Monticello; US 278 / AR 35 in Monticello
- North end: AR 54 near Tyro

Section 2
- Length: 5.8 mi (9.3 km)
- South end: AR 54 near Dumas
- North end: AR 114 near Gould

Location
- Country: United States
- State: Arkansas
- Counties: Drew, Lincoln

Highway system
- Arkansas Highway System; Interstate; US; State; Business; Spurs; Suffixed; Scenic; Heritage
← US 82	→ AR 84

Arkansas Highway 83 (AR 83, Ark. 83 and Hwy. 83) is the designation for a state highway in the U.S. state of Arkansas. The route is mainly located in Southeast Arkansas, and is split into two sections. The first and longest section begins at the University of Arkansas at Monticello and ends at AR 54 near Tyro, or about 10 miles (16 km) southeast of Star City. The second section of the route begins at AR 54 north of Dumas and ends at AR 114 near Gould. AR 83 also has a spur route (designated as Highway 83S or AR 83S), which serves the University of Arkansas at Monticello's northern entrance, as well as Drew Memorial Hospital.

== Route description ==
=== Monticello section ===
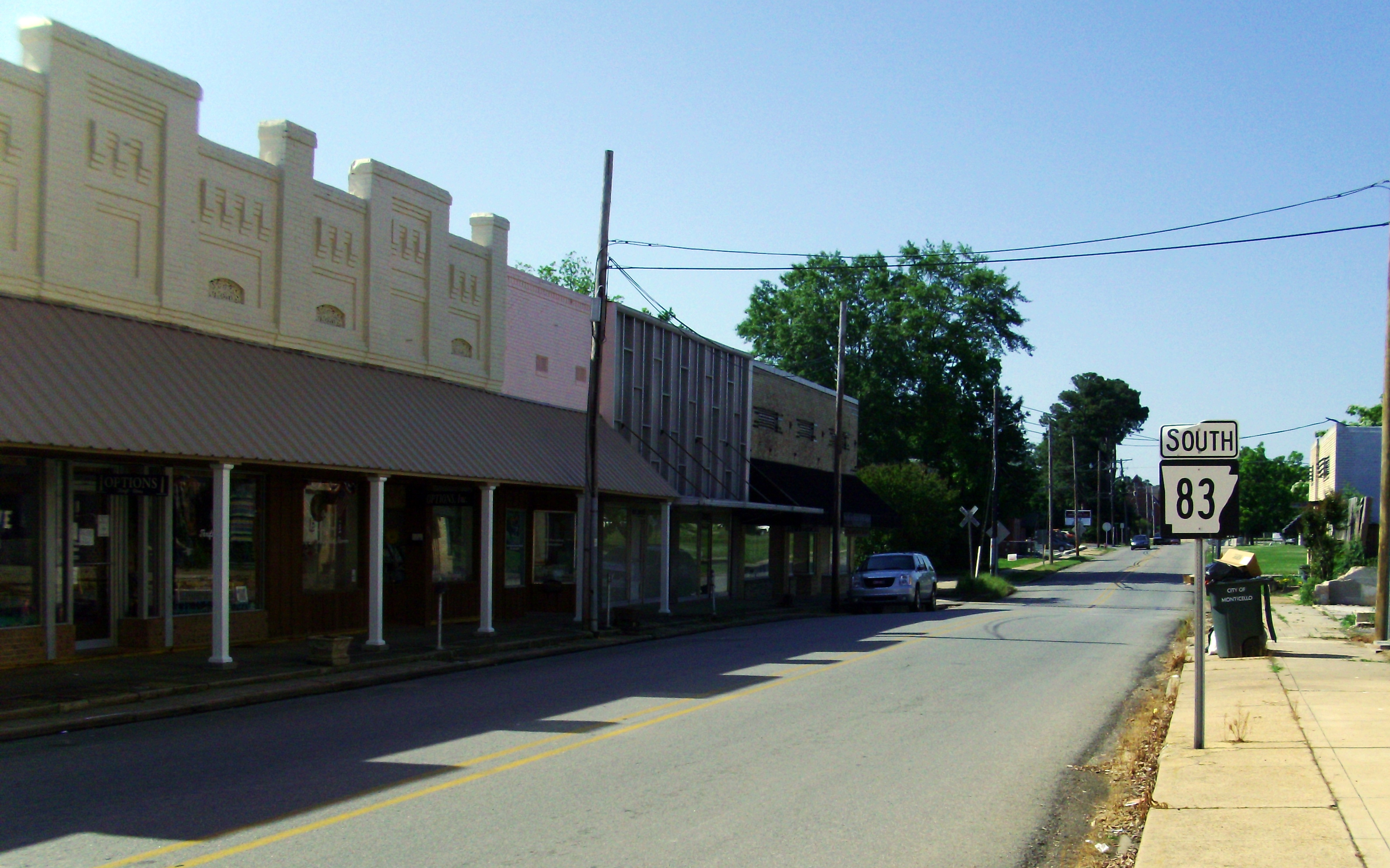
AR 83 in Monticello

The southern terminus for AR 83 is at the east entrance to the University of Arkansas at Monticello. The route travels east for about 1/2 mile (0.80 km) before intersecting U.S. Route 425 (US 425) just south of Monticello, which shares a very short concurrency before heading north. The route heads through downtown, intersecting US 278 along the way. The route continues north before intersecting AR 54 at its northern terminus. The entire route is about 17.1 miles (27.5 km)) long.

=== Dumas to Gould ===
The southern terminus for AR 83 is at AR 54 just northwest of Dumas. From there, the route heads north for about 5.8 miles (9.3 km) before reaching its northern terminus at AR 114 near Gould. The route does not intersect any other highways or towns.

== Major intersections ==
County	Location	mi	km	Destinations	Notes
Drew	Monticello	0.0	0.0	University of Arkansas at Monticello east entrance	Southern terminus
Drew	Monticello	0.5	0.80	US 425 – Hamburg	Southern end of US 425 concurrency
Drew	Monticello	0.7	1.1	US 425 – Star City, Pine Bluff	Northern end of US 425 concurrency
Drew	Monticello	3.0	4.8	AR 83S	Eastern terminus of AR 83S
Drew	Monticello	3.3	5.3	US 278 / AR 35 – Warren, McGehee, Dermott	Roundabout interchange
Drew	Coleman	14.3	23.0	AR 277 – Florence, Selma	Northern terminus of AR 277
Lincoln	Tyro	17.1	27.5	AR 54 – Star City, Dumas	Northern terminus
Lincoln	Gap in route				
Lincoln		0.0	0.0	AR 54 – Dumas	Southern terminus
Lincoln	Gould	5.8	9.3	AR 114 – Gould, Star City	Northern terminus
1.000 mi = 1.609 km; 1.000 km = 0.621 mi

== Spur route ==
Highway 83S
- Location: Monticello
- Length: 2.3 mi (3.7 km)

Highway 83S (AR 83S, Ark. 83S, Hwy. 83S) is a spur route that begins at the north entrance of the University of Arkansas at Monticello and ends at AR 83 in Monticello, just south of downtown.

Major intersections
The entire route is in Monticello, Drew County.

mi	km	Destinations	Notes
0.0	0.0	University of Arkansas at Monticello north entrance	Western terminus
1.7	2.7	US 425 – Hamburg, Star City	Interchange
2.3	3.7	AR 83 – Monticello	Eastern terminus
1.000 mi = 1.609 km; 1.000 km = 0.621 mi
