= Woodlawn, Cleveland County, Arkansas =

Woodlawn, Arkansas
- Census-designated place
- Location in Arkansas
- Coordinates: 33°58′00″N 92°02′43″W
- Country: United States
- State: Arkansas
- County: Cleveland
- Township: Miller

Area
  - Total: 2.35 sq mi (6.09 km^{2})
  - Land: 2.35 sq mi (6.09 km^{2})
  - Water: 0 sq mi (0.00 km^{2})
- Elevation: 262 ft (80 m)

Population (2020)
  - Total: 174
  - Density: 73.9/sq mi (28.55/km^{2})
- Time zone: UTC-6 (Central (CST))
  - Summer (DST): UTC-5 (CDT)
- Area code: 870
- FIPS Code: 05-76690
- GNIS feature ID: 2582924

Woodlawn is a census-designated place in Cleveland County, Arkansas, United States. Per the 2020 census, the population was 174.

== Demographics ==
Historical population
Census	Pop.	Note	%±
2010	209		—
2020	174		−16.7%
U.S. Decennial Census; 2010 2020

=== 2020 census ===
Woodlawn CDP, Arkansas – Racial and ethnic composition Note: the US Census treats Hispanic/Latino as an ethnic category. This table excludes Latinos from the racial categories and assigns them to a separate category. Hispanics/Latinos may be of any race.
Race / Ethnicity (NH = Non-Hispanic)	Pop 2010	Pop 2020	% 2010	% 2020
White alone (NH)	206	164	98.56%	94.25%
Black or African American alone (NH)	0	0	0.00%	0.00%
Native American or Alaska Native alone (NH)	0	0	0.00%	0.00%
Asian alone (NH)	0	0	0.00%	0.00%
Pacific Islander alone (NH)	0	0	0.00%	0.00%
Some Other Race alone (NH)	0	0	0.00%	0.00%
Mixed Race or Multi-Racial (NH)	0	7	0.00%	4.02%
Hispanic or Latino (any race)	3	3	1.44%	1.72%
Total	209	174	100.00%	100.00%

== Education ==
Public education for elementary and secondary students is available from the Woodlawn School District, which leads to graduation from Woodlawn High School.
