= Come Morning =

Come Morning may refer to:

- Come Morning (album), a 1981 album by Grover Washington Jr.
- Come Morning (film), a 2012 dramatic thriller
