= Toledo, Arkansas =

Unincorporated community in Arkansas, US

Coordinates: 33°55′35″N 92°09′41″W

Toledo is an unincorporated community in Cleveland County, Arkansas, United States. From 1873 to 1891, the community served as the county seat. During the town's heyday, there were several businesses and a school. In 1882 the railroad bypassed the community and the county seat moved to Rison. People moved away and the once-thriving town reverted to farmland.

== Geography ==
Toledo is located 2.9 mi (4.7 km) southeast of Rison on Arkansas Highway 35 near its junction with Arkansas Highway 114.
