= Woodlawn School =

Woodlawn School may refer to:

- Woodlawn School Building (Woodlawn, Arkansas), listed on the National Register of Historic Places (NRHP)
- Woodlawn School (Mebane, North Carolina), NRHP-listed
- Woodlawn School (Mooresville, North Carolina), founded 2002

== See also ==
- Woodlawn High School (disambiguation)
