= Rye, Arkansas =

- Census-designated place
- Location of Rye in Cleveland County, Arkansas.

- Location within Arkansas
- Coordinates: 33°44′56″N 92°00′00″W
- Country: United States
- State: Arkansas
- County: Cleveland

Area
  - Total: 4.37 sq mi (11.31 km^{2})
  - Land: 4.37 sq mi (11.31 km^{2})
  - Water: 0 sq mi (0.00 km^{2})
- Elevation: 164 ft (50 m)

Population (2020)
  - Total: 123
  - Density: 28.2/sq mi (10.88/km^{2})
- Time zone: UTC-6 (Central (CST))
  - Summer (DST): UTC-5 (CDT)
- Area code: 870
- GNIS feature ID: 2582922

Rye is a census-designated place in Cleveland County, Arkansas, United States. Per the 2020 census, the population was 123.

== Demographics ==
Historical population
Census	Pop.	Note	%±
2010	146		—
2020	123		−15.8%
U.S. Decennial Census; 2010 2020

=== 2020 census ===
Rye CDP, Arkansas – Racial and ethnic composition Note: the US Census treats Hispanic/Latino as an ethnic category. This table excludes Latinos from the racial categories and assigns them to a separate category. Hispanics/Latinos may be of any race.
Race / Ethnicity (NH = Non-Hispanic)	Pop 2010	Pop 2020	% 2010	% 2020
White alone (NH)	134	117	91.78%	95.12%
Black or African American alone (NH)	0	0	0.00%	0.00%
Native American or Alaska Native alone (NH)	0	0	0.00%	0.00%
Asian alone (NH)	0	0	0.00%	0.00%
Pacific Islander alone (NH)	0	0	0.00%	0.00%
Some Other Race alone (NH)	0	1	0.00%	0.81%
Mixed Race or Multi-Racial (NH)	2	2	1.37%	1.63%
Hispanic or Latino (any race)	10	3	6.85%	2.44%
Total	146	123	100.00%	100.00%

== Education ==
Public education for elementary and secondary students is available from the Woodlawn School District, which leads to graduation from Woodlawn High School.
