= Cleveland County School District =

School district in Arkansas

Location
- 700 Main Street; Rison, Arkansas 71665 United States
- Coordinates: 33°57′15″N 92°11′17″W

District information
- Grades: PK–12
- Superintendent: Craig Dupuy
- Accreditation: Arkansas Department of Education
- Schools: 3
- NCES District ID: 0500067

Students and staff
- Students: 842
- Teachers: 66.81 (on FTE basis)
- Staff: 136.81 (on FTE basis)
- Student–teacher ratio: 12.91
- District mascot: Wildcat
- Colors: Gold; Black

Other information
- Website: www.rison.k12.ar.us

Cleveland County School District is a public school district based in Rison, Arkansas, United States. The school district encompasses 467.75 square miles (1,211.5 km^{2}) of land, including portions of Cleveland County and Bradley County.

Within Cleveland County it serves Rison, Kingsland, Staves, and New Edinburg.

The district provides comprehensive education for more than 800 pre-kindergarten through grade 12 students while employing more than 135 teachers and staff. The district and its schools are accredited by the Arkansas Department of Education (ADE).

== History ==
It was established by the July 1, 2004 consolidation of the Rison School District and the Kingsland School District.

== Schools ==
- Rison High School, located in Rison and serving more than 350 students in grades 7 through 12.
- Rison Elementary School, located in Rison and serves students in kindergarten through grade 6.
- Head Start, located in Kingsland and serves pre-kindergarten.
