= Grapevine, Arkansas =

- Unincorporated community
- Location within Arkansas Location within the United States
- Coordinates: 34°08′44″N 92°18′56″W
- Country: United States
- State: Arkansas
- County: Grant
- Elevation: 256 ft (78 m)
- Time zone: UTC-6 (Central (CST))
  - Summer (DST): UTC-5 (CDT)
- ZIP code: 72057
- Area code: 870
- GNIS feature ID: 57036

Grapevine is an unincorporated community in Grant County, Arkansas, United States. Grapevine is located on Arkansas Highway 35, 12 miles (19 km) south-southeast of Sheridan. Grapevine has a post office with ZIP code 72057.

It is served by the Sheridan School District. The Grapevine School District served it until July 1, 1985, when it consolidated into the Sheridan district.
