= Harper Township, Cleveland County, Arkansas =

Township in Arkansas, U.S.

Coordinates: 33°49′16″N 92°01′44″W

Harper Township is a township in Southeastern Cleveland County, Arkansas. Harper Township was one of the first townships created when Cleveland County was organized on May 17, 1873. The population has since grown to over 538 in 2010
