= Jerry Taylor (politician) =

American politician and businessman (1937–2016)

Member of the Arkansas Senate
- In office 2005–2013

Member of the Arkansas House of Representatives
- In office 2001–2005

Personal details
- Born: Jerry Wayne Taylor; October 9, 1937 Rison, Arkansas, U.S.
- Died: March 19, 2016 (aged 78) Benton, Arkansas, U.S.
- Party: Democratic
- Education: Rison High School
- Occupation: Politician, businessman

Military service
- Allegiance: United States
- Branch/service: United States Army

Jerry Wayne Taylor (October 9, 1937 – March 19, 2016) was an American politician and businessman.

Born in Rison, Arkansas, Taylor graduated from Rison High School in 1955. He then served in the United States Army. Taylor worked in heavy construction. He was owned by Taylor Reality and Taylor Surveying Company in Pine Bluff, Arkansas. Taylor served on the Pine Bluff City Council and as mayor of Pine Bluff. From 2001 to 2005, Taylor served in the Arkansas House of Representatives and was a Democrat. Taylor then served in the Arkansas State Senate from 2005 to 2013 and was the assistant president pro tempore. Taylor died in Benton, Arkansas.
