= Staves, Arkansas =

- Census-designated place
- Location in Cleveland County and Arkansas

- Location in the United States
- Coordinates: 34°01′52″N 92°16′41″W
- Country: United States
- State: Arkansas
- County: Cleveland
- Township: White Oak

Area
  - Total: 2.44 sq mi (6.31 km^{2})
  - Land: 2.44 sq mi (6.31 km^{2})
  - Water: 0.0039 sq mi (0.01 km^{2})
- Elevation: 253 ft (77 m)

Population (2020)
  - Total: 133
  - Density: 54.6/sq mi (21.09/km^{2})
- Time zone: UTC-6 (Central (CST))
  - Summer (DST): UTC-5 (CDT)
- Area code: 870
- GNIS feature ID: 2582923

Staves is a census-designated place in Cleveland County, Arkansas, United States. Per the 2020 census, the population was 133.

Staves was known locally as the "Y" Community, because State Route 212 created a "Y" where it intersected State Route 35, with connectors leading both north and south from State Route 212's east–west direction. The road has since been modified and a third stretch of road has been added to connect State Route 212 at a 90-degree angle to State Route 35.

== Demographics ==
Historical population
Census	Pop.	Note	%±
2010	116		—
2020	133		14.7%
U.S. Decennial Census; 2010 2020

=== 2020 census ===
Staves CDP, Arkansas – Racial and ethnic composition Note: the US Census treats Hispanic/Latino as an ethnic category. This table excludes Latinos from the racial categories and assigns them to a separate category. Hispanics/Latinos may be of any race.
Race / Ethnicity (NH = Non-Hispanic)	Pop 2010	Pop 2020	% 2010	% 2020
White alone (NH)	112	130	96.55%	97.74%
Black or African American alone (NH)	1	0	0.86%	0.00%
Native American or Alaska Native alone (NH)	0	1	0.00%	0.75%
Asian alone (NH)	0	0	0.00%	0.00%
Pacific Islander alone (NH)	0	0	0.00%	0.00%
Some Other Race alone (NH)	0	0	0.00%	0.00%
Mixed Race or Multi-Racial (NH)	2	1	1.72%	0.75%
Hispanic or Latino (any race)	1	1	0.86%	0.75%
Total	116	133	100.00%	100.00%

== Education ==
It is in the Cleveland County School District.

It was in the Rison School District, which merged into Cleveland County in 2004.
