= White Oak Township, Cleveland County, Arkansas =

Place in Cleveland County, Arkansas, US

Coordinates: 34°2′N 92°14′W

White Oak Township is a township in Cleveland County, in the U.S. state of Arkansas. Its population was 335 as of the 2020 census.
