= Kingsland, Arkansas =

City in Arkansas, United States

- City
- City of Kingsland
- Location in Cleveland County and Arkansas

- Location in the United States
- Coordinates: 33°52′12″N 92°16′45″W
- Country: United States
- State: Arkansas
- County: Cleveland
- Founded: June 26, 1883
- Incorporated: July 22, 1884

Government
  - Type: Mayor–council
  - Mayor: (I)
  - Council: City Council

Area
  - Total: 1.12 sq mi (2.91 km^{2})
  - Land: 1.12 sq mi (2.91 km^{2})
  - Water: 0 sq mi (0.00 km^{2})
- Elevation: 194 ft (59 m)

Population (2020)
  - Total: 347
  - Estimate (2025): 332 ▼
  - Density: 309.2/sq mi (119.38/km^{2})
- Time zone: UTC-6 (Central (CST))
  - Summer (DST): UTC-5 (CDT)
- ZIP code: 71652
- Area code: 870
- FIPS code: 05-36880
- GNIS feature ID: 2404832

Kingsland, officially the City of Kingsland, is a small city in Cleveland County, south central Arkansas, United States. It is included in the Pine Bluff, Arkansas micropolitan statistical area, and had a population of 347 as of the 2020 census. It is known as the birthplace of musician Johnny Cash. His parents had a cotton farm there.

== History ==
In 1890, a two-story building was adapted for Kingsland's first public school. A new school was built in 1940 during the Great Depression as part of the Works Progress Administration projects initiated by the President Franklin D. Roosevelt administration.

Country singer Johnny Cash was born in Kingsland in 1932 during the Great Depression to parents who were poor cotton farmers. The family moved when he was three. Cash returned to the town in March 1994, for the dedication of the new post office named in his honor.

In May 2003, the 63-year-old main building at the Kingsland School was destroyed by fire. Damages were estimated to be over $2.1 million. The building's old pine, along with the varnish on the floors, oil on the wood inside, and a gas heating system all contributed to the fierce blaze. Later, the fire was found to have resulted from arson. Two suspects, including a firefighter, were subsequently arrested.

== Geography ==
According to the United States Census Bureau, the town has a total area of 1.1 square miles (2.8 km^{2}), all land.

== Demographics ==
Historical population
Census	Pop.	Note	%±
1890	464		—
1900	364		−21.6%
1910	445		22.3%
1920	397		−10.8%
1930	328		−17.4%
1940	473		44.2%
1950	337		−28.8%
1960	249		−26.1%
1970	304		22.1%
1980	320		5.3%
1990	395		23.4%
2000	449		13.7%
2010	447		−0.4%
2020	347		−22.4%
2025 (est.)	332	▼	−4.3%
U.S. Decennial Census

As of the 2010 census 447 people, 177 households, and 121 families were residing in the town. The population density was 401.4 inhabitants per square mile (155.0/km^{2}). The 211 housing units had an average density of 188.6 per square mile (72.8/km^{2}). The racial makeup of the town was 63.98% White, 32.89% African American, 0.22% Native American, 0.45% Asian, and 2.46% from two or more races.

Of the 219 households, 29.9% had children under 18 living with them, 49.7% were married couples living together, 13.0% had a female householder with no husband present, and 31.6% were not families. About 31.1% of all households were made up of individuals, and 13.0% had someone living alone who was 65 or older. The average household size was 2.54 and the average family size was 3.20.

In the town, the age distribution was 27.96% under 18, 5.82% from 20 to 24, 29.3% from 25 to 49, 20.81% from 50 to 64, and 13.2% who were 65 or older. The median age was 32 years, with 228 females and 219 males.

The median income for a household in the town was $20,536, and for a family was $28,958. Males had a median income of $26,667 versus $16,250 for females. The per capita income for the town was $9,500. About 28.0% of families and 33.3% of the population were below the poverty line, including 42.9% of those under age 18 and 26.1% of those age 65 or over.

== Education ==
Public education for elementary and secondary school students is provided by the Cleveland County School District, which includes students attending Kingsland Elementary School prior to graduating from Rison High School. The district was established by the July 1, 2004, a consolidation of the Kingsland School District and the Rison School District. Kingsland High School closed in 2004.

== In popular culture ==
The film Come Morning (2011) featured Kingsland as its setting. Except for one scene filmed in New Edinburg, Arkansas, the rest of the film was shot entirely in Kingsland.

== Notable people ==
- Cory Carr, Israeli basketball player
- Johnny Cash, country singer-songwriter, actor, and author
