= Woodlawn High School (Arkansas) =

Location
- 6760 Highway 63; Woodlawn, Arkansas 71665; United States; 33°58′2″N 92°2′29″W

Information
- School type: Public (government funded)
- Status: Open
- School district: Woodlawn School District
- NCES District ID: 0514400
- Authority: Arkansas Department of Education (ADE)
- CEEB code: 042150
- NCES School ID: 051440001172
- Teaching staff: 23.55 (on FTE basis)
- Grades: 7–12
- Enrollment: 269 (2023–2024)
- Student to teacher ratio: 11.42
- Education system: ADE Smart Core curriculum
- Classes offered: Regular, Advanced Placement
- Campus type: Rural
- Colors: Black and white
- Athletics: American football, cross country, basketball, baseball, softball, wrestling, track & field, cheerleading
- Athletics conference: 2A Region 8 (football), 2A Region 7 West (basketball)
- Mascot: Bear
- Team name: Woodlawn Bears
- Accreditation: ADE
- Affiliation: Arkansas Activities Association, SEACBEC
- Website: www.whsbears.org/o/whs

Woodlawn High School (WHS) is a comprehensive public high school serving students in grades 7 through 12 in the rural community of Woodlawn, Cleveland County, Arkansas, United States. It is one of two public high schools located in Cleveland County and is the sole high school of the Woodlawn School District.

== Academics ==
The school is accredited by the Arkansas Department of Education (ADE). The assumed course of study follows the Smart Core curriculum developed the ADE, which requires students to complete at least 24 credit units before graduation. Students engage in regular (core) and career focus courses and exams and may select Advanced Placement (AP) coursework and exams that may lead to college credit. Woodlawn is affiliated with the Southeast Arkansas Community Based Education Center (SEACBEC), which provides vocational training skills classes, industry training, adult based education, child care, college classes and testing services.

== Athletics ==
The Woodlawn High School mascot and athletic emblem is the Bear with the school colors of black and white.

The Woodlawn Bears participate in various interscholastic activities in the 2A Classification within the 2A Region 8 Conference for football and 2A Region 7 West Conference for basketball as administered by the Arkansas Activities Association. The Bears compete in American football, cross country (girls), basketball (boys/girls), wrestling, baseball, softball, track and field (boys/girls) and cheerleading.
