= Come Morning (film) =

- Theatrical Poster
- Directed by: Derrick Sims
- Written by: Derrick Sims
- Produced by: Andrea Cadelli; Zac Heath; Dan Moore; Kevin Beebe
- Starring: Michael Ray Davis; Thor Wahlestedt; Elise Rovinsky; Thomas Moore; Blake Logan; Maurice Mejia; Dean Denton; Richard Ledbetter
- Cinematography: Derrick Sims
- Edited by: Derrick Sims
- Music by: Justin Slaughter
- Release dates: October 21, 2012 (Austin Film Festival); November 21, 2013 (United States)
- Running time: 80 minutes
- Country: United States
- Language: English

Come Morning is a dramatic thriller written and directed by Derrick Sims, who also was the cinematographer. The independent film was shot near Kingsland, Arkansas in Cleveland County. Come Morning premiered October 21, 2012 at the Austin Film Festival.

The film won a special jury award for cinematography at the 2013 Oxford Film Festival and the Best of Fest Award at the Charles B. Pierce Film Festival. Produced by Fabled Motion Pictures, which Sims owns with a partner, the film was given a limited theatrical release in November 2013.

== Plot ==
Arkansas, November 1973, Frank and his grandson, D, go on an afternoon hunt. Just before dusk, they wander into the darkening woods to track down their kill. To their horror, they find that instead of a deer, they’ve shot their trespassing neighbor, Marion Mitchell.

With a history of land disputes with the Mitchells fresh on Frank’s mind, he tells his grandson that they have to hide the body deep in the woods. As the night draws on, Frank and the boy find themselves only deeper in darkness. Soon the lines between good and evil are no longer clear. D begins to question if all will really be okay, come morning.

== Cast ==
- Michael Ray Davis as Frank
- Thor Wahlestedt as D
- Elise Rovinsky as Morigan
- Thomas Moore as Marion Mitchell
- Blake Logan as Wes Mitchell
- Maurice Mejia as Jack
- Dean Denton as Jim
- Richard Ledbetter as Charlie

== Production ==
Come Morning was shot over 12 days in mid-October 2011. Filming took place just outside the small town of Kingsland, Arkansas, the boyhood home of director, Derrick Sims. Sims set the film in 1970s Kingsland because, he said, “It captures the atmosphere and the hunting culture of southern Arkansas." He said that hunting was different then, more basic. "I didn't want the characters to bait the deer or have motion cameras to photograph them. I also didn't want them to have cellphones. There's just something unromantic about [them].""

According to the film's production diaries, the daytime temperature during the final days of shooting was 33 degrees and conditions were harried.

"We were standing in three feet of water...we had been shooting for 16 straight hours, and we were more like the walking dead than filmmakers. We had done the unthinkable; we had shot a feature-length film in just 12 days. That kind of thing doesn’t happen, and we fully understood why. Most films don’t call for heavy effects makeup, 75% night shoots, remote locations, living animals, bitter cold, shooting in water, gunshots, driving stunts...and child actors. Add an extremely low budget and 12 days of shooting on top of all of that. It's pure madness".

Though the film is fictional, Sims drew from memories of hunting with his grandfather as a boy for the characters of "Frank" and "D". The film is set in a distinct cultural part of Arkansas, and many minor roles were filled by local actors and non-actors. Actors from around the US were cast in the five more prominent roles.

Budget constraints limited the crew to ten people. Sims served as the film's writer, director, cinematographer, and editor. Other cast and crew members also served in multiple roles behind the camera. The film was shot on the RED MX with Cooke S4 Lenses.

== Critical response ==
At the 2012 Austin Film Festival, Come Morning received generally good reviews. Austin Fusion Magazine said the film was "a subtle yet profound emotional roller coaster that will pull on your heart strings and unsettle your reasonings". KUT, Austin's NPR member station, said, "It's an intense trip through the darkness of the woods and the soul, with phenomenal performances from a cast of unknowns and breathtaking cinematography".

Come Morning went on to win a special jury award for cinematography at the festival that year. Since then, the film has been praised by FilmThreat, Blu-Ray.com, Film School Rejects, Rogue Cinema, The Arkansas Democrat Gazette and many more.

The film won Best of Fest award at the 2014 Charles B. Pierce Film Festival.

== Publicity ==
In October 2011, KQ102.3FM did an on-air interview with Sims, producer Zac Heath, and actors Thomas Moore, Maurice Mejia, and Richard Ledbetter.

In February 2012, Arkansas Life, a publication of the Arkansas Democrat-Gazette, featured the film Come Morning in their Arkansas Artists edition. SEARK Today highlighted this film in addition to Jeff Nichols's Mud, as noteworthy productions of 2011.

On November 29, 2012, Sims and Come Morning were prominently featured on the MPAA's TheCredits.org in an article about rising filmmakers on the festival circuit.

The film has been featured in @Urban Magazine, Blu-Ray.com, AMFM Magazine, Sync Weekly, Ozarks at Large on NPR, P3 Update, SEA Life Magazine, SEARK Today, Revel@Conway, and on multiple occasions, The Cleveland County Herald.

== Secondary distribution ==
The film was released on Blu-ray, DVD, and VOD on September 23, 2014 by Monarch Home Entertainment and Phase 4 Films. In 2016, Fabled Motion Pictures reclaimed the rights to the film and released it exclusively on Amazon Prime.
