= Miller Township, Cleveland County, Arkansas =

Place in Cleveland County, Arkansas, US

Coordinates: 34°0′N 92°03′W

Miller Township is a township in Cleveland County, in the U.S. state of Arkansas. Its population was 568 as of the 2020 census.
