= Rison Cities Service Station =

- U.S. National Register of Historic Places
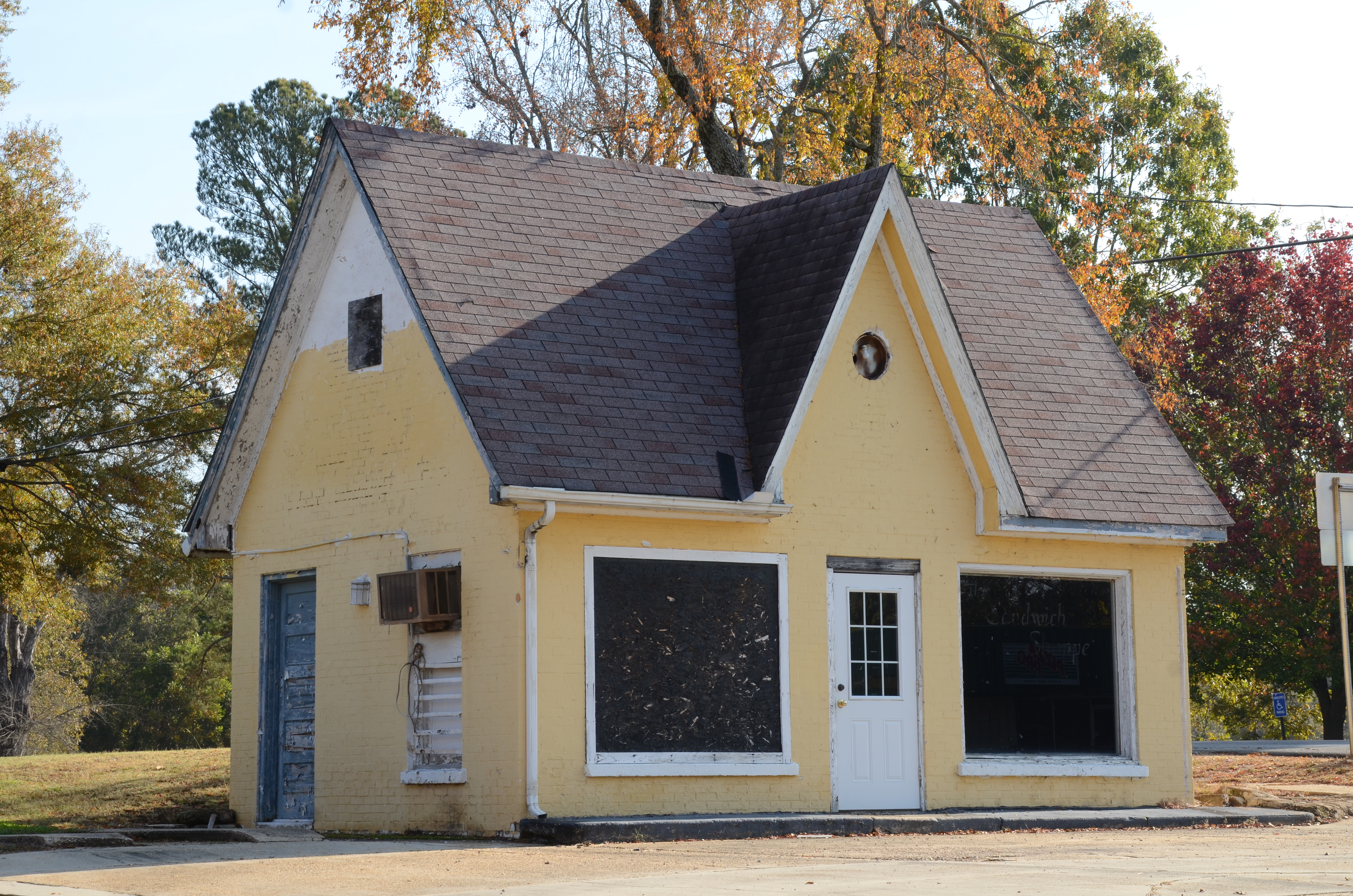

- Location within Arkansas Location within the United States
- Location: 308 Main St., Rison, Arkansas
- Coordinates: 33°57′31″N 92°11′24″W
- Area: less than one acre
- Built: 1938
- Built by: Cities Service (now Citgo)
- Architectural style: Tudor Revival
- MPS: Arkansas Highway History and Architecture MPS
- NRHP reference No.: 01000486
- Added to NRHP: May 10, 2001

The Rison Cities Service Station is a historic automobile service station at Main and Magnolia Streets in Rison, Arkansas. It is a distinctive modest brick English Revival structure built in 1938. It has a cross-gable roof, in which there is a small oculus in each of the gables. The front facade has large plate glass windows flanking a central doorway. It was built and operated by the Arkansas Fuel and Oil Company, which operated it from 1938 to 1969 as a Cities Service station. Since then it has been seen various commercial uses.

The building was listed on the National Register of Historic Places in 2001.

== See also ==
- Rison Texaco Service Station, a former Art Deco station just up the road
- National Register of Historic Places listings in Cleveland County, Arkansas
