= Tyrell Johnson (American football) =

American football player (born 1985)

No. 25, 24
- Position: Safety

Personal information
- Born: May 19, 1985 (age 41); Rison, Arkansas, U.S.
- Listed height: 6 ft 0 in (1.83 m)
- Listed weight: 207 lb (94 kg)

Career information
- High school: Rison
- College: Arkansas State (2003–2007)
- NFL draft: 2008: 2nd round, 43rd overall pick

Career history
- Minnesota Vikings (2008–2011); Miami Dolphins (2012)*; Detroit Lions (2012); Atlanta Falcons (2014)*
- * Offseason or practice squad member only

Awards and highlights
- Third-team All-American (2007); Sun Belt Defensive Player of the Year (2007); 3× First-team All-Sun Belt (2005-2007); Second-team All-Sun Belt (2004)

Career NFL statistics
- Total tackles: 115
- Fumble recoveries: 2
- Pass deflections: 10
- Interceptions: 2
- Stats at Pro Football Reference

Marcellous "Tyrell" Johnson (born May 19, 1985) is an American former professional football player who was a safety in the National Football League (NFL). He played college football for the Arkansas State Indians and was selected by the Minnesota Vikings in the second round of the 2008 NFL draft. Johnson was also a member of the Miami Dolphins, Detroit Lions, and Atlanta Falcons.

== Early life ==
Johnson played high school football at Rison High School in Rison, Arkansas, competing at both running back and defensive back. As a senior in 2002 he earned All-State and All-Conference honors despite playing with a high ankle sprain. He also helped his team finish with a perfect regular-season record and win the 8AA Conference title. As a sophomore in 2000 he had helped Rison High School win the state football championship with a victory over Shiloh Christian which was coached by Gus Malzahn. Johnson finished his career with three interceptions, 2,725 rushing yards, and 49 touchdowns. He also ran track and played basketball, starting on his high school's state playoff basketball team in 2000.

== College career ==
Johnson played college football at Arkansas State. After being redshirted during his freshman year in 2003, he became a starter in 2004 and never lost his job. During his freshman season, he earned Freshman All-American and second-team All-Sun Belt Conference honors. During his sophomore year, he led the team in tackles with 112 and earned All-Sun Belt Conference first-team recognition. During his junior year in 2006 he earned first-team All-Sun Belt Conference for the second straight year after recording 63 tackles and an interception. His best season came in 2007 as he earned third-team All-American, first-team All-Sun Belt Conference and was the leagues Defensive Player of the Year after recording 94 tackles and six interceptions.

He finished his career playing in 46 games, starting all of them, with a Sun Belt Conference record 363 tackles, 13 interceptions, and four forced fumbles. He also holds the conferences records for interception return yards in a season with 142 in 2007 and tackles in a game with 25 in 2005.

== Professional career ==
Pre-draft measurables
Height	Weight	Arm length	Hand span	40-yard dash	10-yard split	20-yard split	Vertical jump	Broad jump	Bench press
5 ft 11 7/8 in (1.83 m)	207 lb (94 kg)	32 5/8 in (0.83 m)	9 5/8 in (0.24 m)	4.41 s	1.49 s	2.52 s	32.0 in (0.81 m)	10 ft 7 in (3.23 m)	27 reps
All values from NFL Combine

=== Minnesota Vikings ===
When Johnson was available in the second round, the Vikings traded their fourth-round pick to the Philadelphia Eagles for the Eagles' fifth-round pick in order to move up from the 47th overall pick to the 43rd overall pick.

On October 6, 2008, Johnson made his first career interception against New Orleans Saints quarterback Drew Brees. He finished his rookie season starting 7 of 16 games, recording 31 tackles and an interception.

The next season, he became the starter at the strong safety position. Johnson started and played in 15 games where he recorded 57 tackles and another interception. This interception was made in the end zone against the St. Louis Rams who were on the Vikings 9 yard line before Johnson killed their long drive.

Johnson's 2011 season was cut short, as he was placed on injured reserve on November 29, 2011.

=== Miami Dolphins ===
Johnson signed with the Miami Dolphins on April 5, 2012. He was released during the preseason on August 25, 2012.

=== Atlanta Falcons ===
Johnson signed with the Atlanta Falcons on August 4, 2014.

=== Episcopal Collegiate School ===
Johnson worked at Episcopal Collegiate School, a premier private college preparatory K-12 school in Little Rock, AR, as Head Varsity Boys Football Coach, Head Strength and Conditioning Coach, Head Varsity Track Coach, Head Junior High Basketball Coach, Assistant Varsity Boys Basketball Coach.

=== Bryant High School ===
In 2024, Johnson was hired at Bryant High School, a comprehensive 10-12 public high school in Bryant, AR, as the defensive coordinator for the school's Varsity Boys Football program. Since 2018, the program has obtained five state championships, and obtained a sixth one the same year Johnson was added to the coaching staff.

== Personal life ==
Johnson's father, Alvin Robertson, played ten years in the NBA for the San Antonio Spurs, Milwaukee Bucks, Detroit Pistons, and Toronto Raptors His mother, Patricia, ran track for the University of Arkansas. Johnson is a member of Alpha Phi Alpha fraternity.
