= Rison Texaco Service Station =

- U.S. National Register of Historic Places
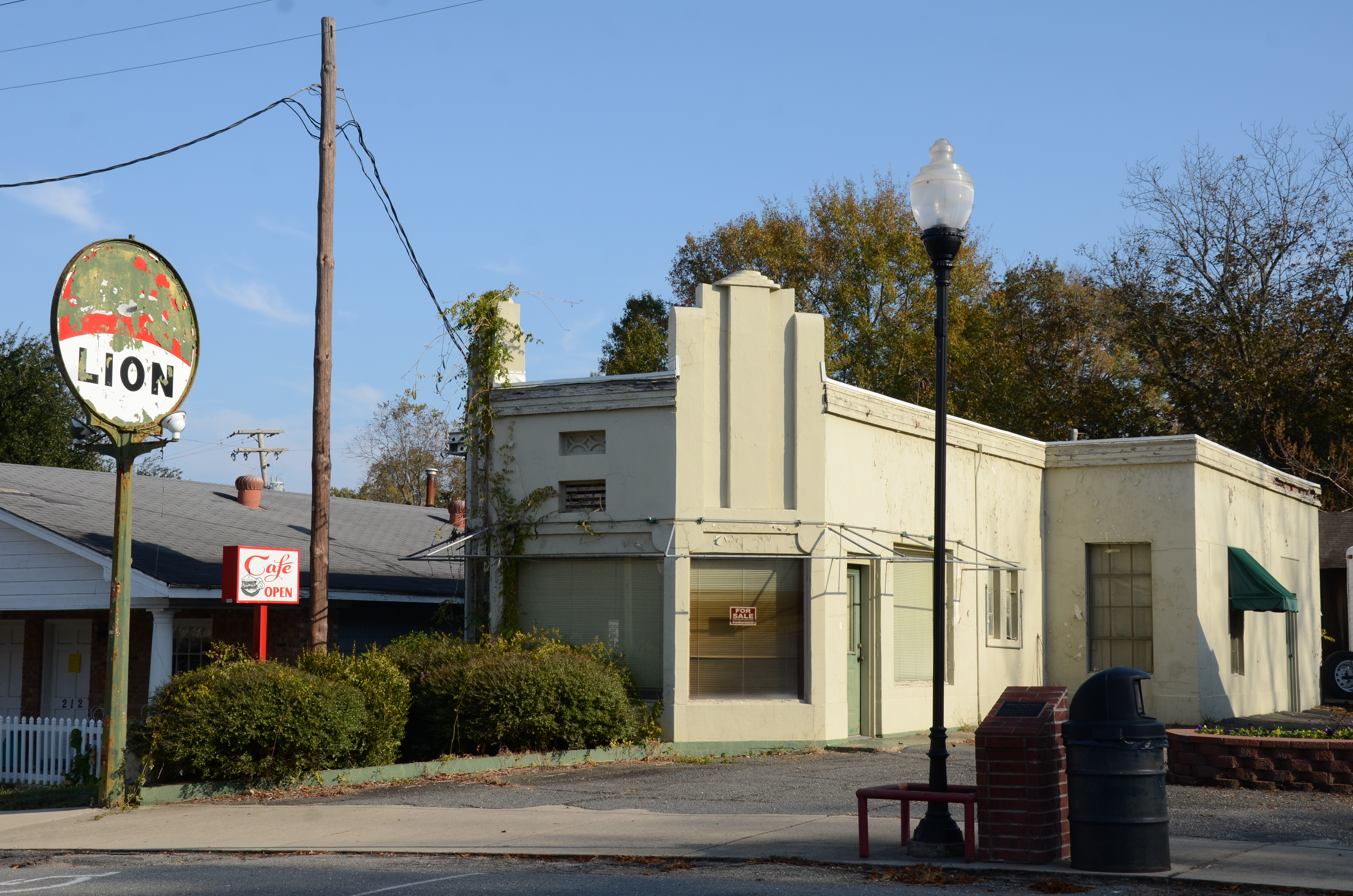

- Location within Arkansas Location within the United States
- Location: 216 Main St., Rison, Arkansas
- Coordinates: 33°57′34″N 92°11′26″W
- Area: less than one acre
- Built: 1926
- Architectural style: Art Deco
- MPS: Arkansas Highway History and Architecture MPS
- NRHP reference No.: 01001243
- Added to NRHP: March 25, 2002

The Rison Texaco Service Station is a historic automobile service station at 216 Main Street (corner of Third Street) in Rison, Arkansas. It is a distinctive Art Deco structure built c. 1926. Since 1990 it has housed a timber company.

The building was listed on the National Register of Historic Places in 2002.

== See also ==
- Rison Cities Service Station, an English Revival station just up the road
- National Register of Historic Places listings in Cleveland County, Arkansas
