= Phoenix Hotel (Rison, Arkansas) =

- Formerly listed on the U.S. National Register of Historic Places
- Location within Arkansas Location within the United States
- Location: 108 Main St., Rison, Arkansas
- Coordinates: 33°57′36″N 92°11′27″W
- Area: less than one acre
- Built: 1913
- Architect: Hugh Ogletree
- Architectural style: Early Commercial
- NRHP reference No.: 02001071

Significant dates
- Added to NRHP: October 4, 2002
- Removed from NRHP: January 2, 2024

The Phoenix Hotel building at 180 Main Street was the most prominent and distinctive building in downtown Rison, Arkansas. It was a two-story brick building that was built in 1913 by Dr. T. H. Ackerman to replace a previous hotel building on the site. The most distinctive feature of its facade was a basket-handled arch that framed the recessed porch on the second floor. The roof line was more elaborate than that of other downtown buildings, with corbels and brick quoins decorating the roof edge. The hotel went through a modest number of owners before closing its doors in the 1960s.

The building was listed on the National Register of Historic Places in 2002. It was demolished July 2014, and the site is now the location of Gateway Bank formerly known as the Bank of Rison. The building was delisted from the National Register in 2024.

== See also ==
- National Register of Historic Places listings in Cleveland County, Arkansas
