= Calmer, Arkansas =

Unincorporated community in Arkansas, US

Coordinates: 33°56′15″N 92°01′51″W

Calmer is an unincorporated community in Cleveland County, Arkansas, United States.
