= Rison School District =

Defunct school district in Arkansas, United States

Rison School District was a school district headquartered in Rison, Arkansas. It operated Rison Elementary School and Rison High School. Its mascot was the wildcat.

It included the community of Staves.

On July 1, 2004, it consolidated with the Kingsland School District to form the Cleveland County School District.
