= Kingsland School District =

Defunct school district in Arkansas, United States

Kingsland School District was a school district headquartered in Kingsland, Arkansas. It operated Kingsland Elementary School and Kingsland High School. Its mascot was the greyhound.

== History ==
In 1890 a two-story building became Kingsland's first school. A new school built as part of the Works Progress Administration (WPA) opened in 1940. A bus maintenance building was built in 1993. A fine arts building and two classroom structures opened in a period between 1986 and 2001. Circa 2001 multiple renovations had occurred. On July 1, 1985, the New Edinburg district consolidated into the Kingsland district. On July 1, 2004, the school district consolidated with the Rison School District to form the Cleveland County School District.
