= Rison, Arkansas =

City in Arkansas, United States

- City
- City of Rison
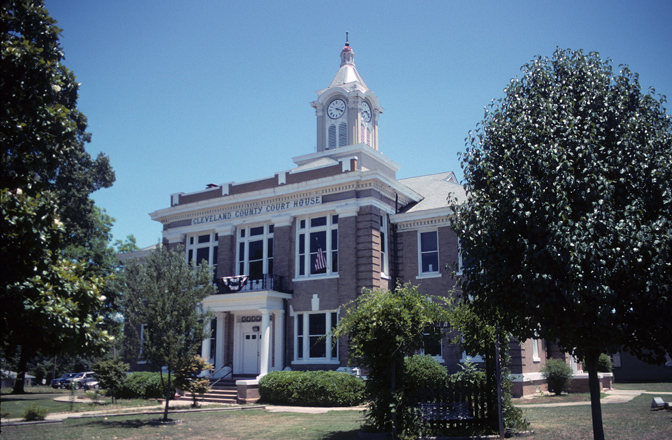
- Cleveland County Courthouse in Rison - listed on National Register of Historic Places

- Location in Cleveland County and Arkansas

- Location in the United States
- Coordinates: 33°57′36″N 92°11′37″W
- Country: United States
- State: Arkansas
- County: Cleveland
- Founded: November 1, 1883
- Incorporated: August 26, 1890
- Founder: Samuel Fordyce
- Named for: William Rison

Government
  - Type: Mayor–Council
  - Mayor: (I)
  - Council: City Council

Area
  - Total: 3.27 sq mi (8.48 km^{2})
  - Land: 3.27 sq mi (8.48 km^{2})
  - Water: 0 sq mi (0.00 km^{2})
- Elevation: 230 ft (70 m)

Population (2020)
  - Total: 967
  - Estimate (2025): 917 ▼
  - Density: 295.2/sq mi (113.99/km^{2})
- Time zone: UTC−06:00 (Central (CST))
  - Summer (DST): UTC−05:00 (CDT)
- ZIP Code: 71665
- Area code: 870
- FIPS code: 05-59480
- GNIS feature ID: 2404622

Rison, officially the City of Rison, is a city in and the county seat of Cleveland County, Arkansas, United States. As of the 2020 census, Rison had a population of 967. It is included in the Pine Bluff, Arkansas Micropolitan Statistical Area. Rison is a bedroom community for people who work in Pine Bluff (in neighboring Jefferson County). The largest employers are the city and county governments, the Cleveland County School District, the Cleveland County Nursing Home. There are two banks, eight churches, and about forty-five businesses within the city limits. Among the local properties listed on the National Register of Historic Places are the Rison Cities Service Station and the Rison Texaco Service Station.

== History ==
The Texas and St. Louis Railroad gave rise to Rison. The county seat of Dorsey County (present day Cleveland County) was originally Toledo. When the railroad was routed through the county in 1882, Rison did not exist. Samuel Fordyce of Huntsville, Alabama, a former Union army officer, was authorized to determine the route of the railroad from Texarkana to Birds Point, Missouri. According to unsubstantiated legend, when the leading citizens of Toledo snubbed his plans to route the railroad through that community, Fordyce planned a route three miles north and built a station through land that would later become Rison.

Fordyce named the new station for William Rison, his former business partner in a banking venture in Alabama, who had fought on the opposite side of the Civil War. The first home erected in the community the small settlement that grew up around the new station was built in 1880 by lawyer and farmer James McMurtrey. In 1883, the Southwest Improvement Association, a subsidiary of the railroad company, presented a parcel of land for use by the inhabitants of the area that became Rison. The settlement was incorporated on August 26, 1890, with J. T. Renfrow as mayor. The name of the county was changed from Dorsey to Cleveland in 1885; the popularity of U.S. Senator Stephen Dorsey had waned, and President Grover Cleveland's name was substituted. The Arkansas Supreme Court relocated the county seat from Toledo to Rison in 1891 after a spirited battle among the leading contenders, Toledo, Kingsland, and Rison.

The railroad remained Rison's point of reference for decades. “Rison on the Cotton Belt” was the affectionate way residents referred to their community. The commercial value of the railroad was felt from the beginning. The economy depended on the production of cotton, lumber, and, ultimately, a wide variety of wood products, including pulpwood, piling, pallets, broom handle squares, ammunition boxes, and Army pup tent poles.

The financial make-up of the community was divided for several decades into owners and sharecroppers. The emergence of the timber-related wood products business ultimately skewed that economic picture, with the corresponding rise of the merchant entrepreneurs also affecting it somewhat. Nevertheless, family fortunes were built on the owner/sharecropper system, and they influenced the financial and social structure of the town. Sharecropping was the prevailing structure of the primary business enterprise in the county until the land became depleted by failure to rotate crops adequately.

The Cleveland County Courthouse was built in 1911 after two contested elections. Two years later, the Phoenix Hotel was built and served as a popular gathering spot for the local community.

Three cotton gins operated in and around Rison. The largest and most efficient gin was owned by Ira E. Moore. That gin was built in 1933 to replace one owned by Moore that was built in 1926 and burned in 1933. The more modern and efficient all-electric gin built in 1933 was the first of its kind in the area.

Residents of Rison owned and operated a dozen or more sawmills. The largest lumber mills were the J. I. Porter Lumber Company and the Clio Lumber Company. The Clio mill was built in 1887 five miles north of Rison. According to a 1909 issue of Lumberman's Magazine, the Clio mill owned several thousand acres of timberland and had 432 employees in the sawmill, 130 on the woods crew, and eighty operating the tramlines that transported the logs to the mill. Other mills that added significantly to the economy were the J. L. Sadler Lumber Company, the C. L. Garner & Sons Lumber Company, and the Elrod Lumber Company. In the 1950s, Elrod employed about one-third of Rison's population, more than 300.

During World War II, many Rison residents secured war-related jobs in nearby towns. These included the Pine Bluff Arsenal (Jefferson County) and the Naval Ammunition Depot at Camden (Ouachita County). Others went to California to work in the shipbuilding industry. The Rison high school's football program was suspended until the end of the war due to a lack of players and coaches, as well as financial constraints. One of Rison's citizens, Airman Roy Martin, was shot down over occupied France and classified as missing in action. The French underground secured his freedom by hiding him in attics, barns, and other places not known to the German occupying forces. When the news of Martin's survival reached Rison, a wild celebration broke out in streets and homes.

== Geography ==
Rison is located in north-central Cleveland County. U.S. Route 79 passes through the western side of the city, leading northeast 25 miles (40 km) to Pine Bluff and southwest 17 miles (27 km) to Fordyce.

According to the United States Census Bureau, the city has a total area of 2.6 square miles (6.8 km^{2}), all land.

== Demographics ==
Historical population
Census	Pop.	Note	%±
1900	453		—
1910	725		60.0%
1920	685		−5.5%
1930	876		27.9%
1940	1,005		14.7%
1950	953		−5.2%
1960	889		−6.7%
1970	1,214		36.6%
1980	1,325		9.1%
1990	1,258		−5.1%
2000	1,271		1.0%
2010	1,344		5.7%
2020	967		−28.1%
2025 (est.)	917	▼	−5.2%
U.S. Decennial Census

=== 2020 census ===
Rison racial composition
Race	Number	Percentage
White (non-Hispanic)	540	55.84%
Black or African American (non-Hispanic)	332	34.33%
Native American	4	0.41%
Other/Mixed	42	4.34%
Hispanic or Latino	49	5.07%

As of the 2020 United States census, there were 967 people, 498 households, and 297 families residing in the city.

=== 2000 census ===
As of the census of 2000, there were 1,271 people, 471 households, and 324 families residing in the city. The population density was 475.1 inhabitants per square mile (183.4/km^{2}). There were 532 housing units at an average density of 198.9 per square mile (76.8/km^{2}). The racial makeup of the city was 62.23% White, 33.36% Black or African American, 0.31% Native American, 0.24% Asian, 1.73% from other races, and 2.12% from two or more races. 2.20% of the population were Hispanic or Latino of any race.

There were 471 households, out of which 36.3% had children under the age of 18 living with them, 45.0% were married couples living together, 19.1% had a female householder with no husband present, and 31.2% were non-families. 30.1% of all households were made up of individuals, and 15.3% had someone living alone who was 65 years of age or older. The average household size was 2.55 and the average family size was 3.16.

In the city, the population was spread out, with 29.3% under the age of 18, 6.8% from 18 to 24, 25.3% from 25 to 44, 19.6% from 45 to 64, and 19.0% who were 65 years of age or older. The median age was 36 years. For every 100 females, there were 79.8 males. For every 100 females age 18 and over, there were 75.2 males.

The median income for a household in the city was $20,865, and the median income for a family was $30,833. Males had a median income of $26,500 versus $18,229 for females. The per capita income for the city was $13,106. About 25.6% of families and 32.9% of the population were below the poverty line, including 46.0% of those under age 18 and 30.5% of those age 65 or over.

== Education ==
Public education for early childhood, elementary and secondary school students in the city limits of Rison is provided by the Cleveland County School District, which is headquartered in Rison. Students graduate from Rison High School. The district was established by the July 1, 2004, consolidation of the Rison School District and the Kingsland School District.

== Notable people ==
- Jeremy James, singer/songwriter originally from Rison
- Tyrell Johnson, NFL player for the Minnesota Vikings
- Jerry Taylor, Arkansas legislator and businessman
- Buddy Turner, Arkansas legislator
- Ed Wilson, Arkansas Entertainers Hall of Fame
