= Cleveland County, Arkansas =

County in Arkansas, United States

- County
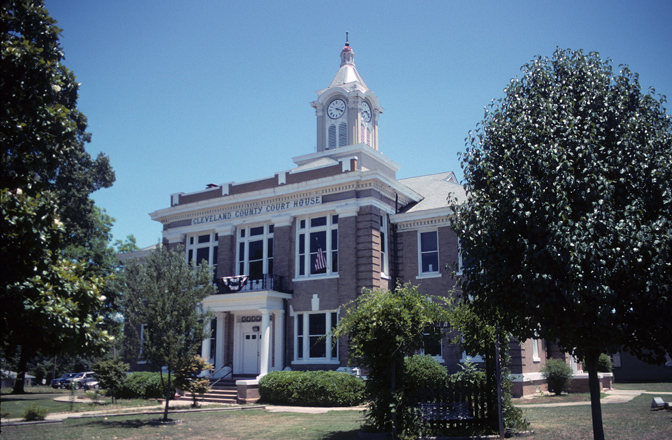
- Cleveland County Courthouse in Rison

- Location within the U.S. state of Arkansas
- Coordinates: 33°53′50″N 92°10′12″W
- Country: United States
- State: Arkansas
- Founded: April 17, 1873
- Named for: Grover Cleveland
- Seat: Rison
- Largest city: Rison

Area
  - Total: 599 sq mi (1,550 km^{2})
  - Land: 598 sq mi (1,550 km^{2})
  - Water: 1.0 sq mi (2.6 km^{2}) 0.2%

Population (2020)
  - Total: 7,550
  - Estimate (2025): 7,224 ▼
  - Density: 12.6/sq mi (4.87/km^{2})
- Time zone: UTC−6 (Central)
  - Summer (DST): UTC−5 (CDT)
- Congressional district: 4th
- Website: www.arcounties.org/counties/cleveland/

Cleveland County (formerly known as Dorsey County) is a county located in the U.S. state of Arkansas. Its population was 7,550 at the 2020 U.S. census. The county seat and largest city is Rison. Cleveland County is included in the Little Rock-North Little Rock-Conway, AR Metropolitan Statistical Area. Cleveland County is 598 sq. miles, and ranks 57th of Arkansas's 75 counties in terms of size.

== History ==
The Arkansas legislature established Dorsey County as Arkansas's 71st county on April 17, 1873, naming it for Stephen W. Dorsey, the U.S. Senator from Arkansas. When he was indicted for defrauding the Post Office, they renamed it on March 5, 1885, for Grover Cleveland, the newly elected President of the United States.

The Battle of Marks' Mills, the pivotal engagement in the Union Army's ill-fated Camden Expedition during the U.S. Civil War, took place in what is now Cleveland County. This engagement resulted in a crushing victory for Confederate forces, though the victory ultimately proved to be hollow when Federal General Frederick Steele and the rest of his army managed to escape from Camden to Little Rock.

== Geography ==
According to the U.S. Census Bureau, the county has a total area of 599 square miles (1,550 km^{2}), of which 598 square miles (1,550 km^{2}) is land and 1.0 square mile (2.6 km^{2}) (0.2%) is water.

=== Major highways ===
- U.S. Highway 63
- U.S. Highway 79
- U.S. Highway 167
- Highway 8
- Highway 11
- Highway 15 (now US 63)
- Highway 35
- Highway 54
- Highway 97
- Highway 114
- Highway 133
- Highway 189
- Highway 212
- Highway 530

=== Adjacent counties ===
- Grant County (northwest)
- Jefferson County (northeast)
- Lincoln County (east)
- Drew County (southeast)
- Bradley County (south)
- Calhoun County (southwest)
- Dallas County (west)

== Demographics ==
Historical population
Census	Pop.	Note	%±
1890	11,362		—
1900	11,620		2.3%
1910	13,481		16.0%
1920	12,260		−9.1%
1930	12,744		3.9%
1940	12,570		−1.4%
1950	8,956		−28.8%
1960	6,944		−22.5%
1970	6,605		−4.9%
1980	7,868		19.1%
1990	7,781		−1.1%
2000	8,571		10.2%
2010	8,689		1.4%
2020	7,550		−13.1%
2025 (est.)	7,224	▼	−4.3%
U.S. Decennial Census; 1790–1960 1900–1990; 1990–2000 2010

=== 2020 census ===
As of the 2020 census, the county had a population of 7,550. The median age was 44.8 years. 21.3% of residents were under the age of 18 and 21.4% of residents were 65 years of age or older. For every 100 females there were 96.0 males, and for every 100 females age 18 and over there were 93.6 males age 18 and over.

The racial makeup of the county was 85.6% White, 9.1% Black or African American, 0.5% American Indian and Alaska Native, 0.1% Asian, <0.1% Native Hawaiian and Pacific Islander, 1.2% from some other race, and 3.5% from two or more races. Hispanic or Latino residents of any race comprised 2.4% of the population.

<0.1% of residents lived in urban areas, while 100.0% lived in rural areas.

There were 3,101 households in the county, of which 29.2% had children under the age of 18 living in them. Of all households, 53.6% were married-couple households, 17.6% were households with a male householder and no spouse or partner present, and 24.1% were households with a female householder and no spouse or partner present. About 26.5% of all households were made up of individuals and 13.6% had someone living alone who was 65 years of age or older.

There were 3,570 housing units, of which 13.1% were vacant. Among occupied housing units, 80.5% were owner-occupied and 19.5% were renter-occupied. The homeowner vacancy rate was 1.5% and the rental vacancy rate was 6.4%.

=== 2000 census ===
As of the 2000 United States census, there were 8,571 people, 3,273 households, and 2,513 families residing in the county. The population density was 14 people per square mile (5.4 people/km^{2}). There were 3,834 housing units at an average density of 6 units per square mile (2.3 units/km^{2}). The racial makeup of the county was 84.79% White, 13.22% Black or African American, 0.32% Native American, 0.14% Asian, 0.04% Pacific Islander, 0.68% from other races, and 0.83% from two or more races. 1.62% of the population were Hispanic or Latino of any race.

There were 3,273 households, out of which 34.90% had children under the age of 18 living with them, 62.70% were married couples living together, 9.90% had a female householder with no husband present, and 23.20% were non-families. 21.40% of all households were made up of individuals, and 10.00% had someone living alone who was 65 years of age or older. The average household size was 2.60 and the average family size was 3.00.

In the county, the population was spread out, with 26.20% under the age of 18, 7.90% from 18 to 24, 27.70% from 25 to 44, 24.70% from 45 to 64, and 13.60% who were 65 years of age or older. The median age was 37 years. For every 100 females, there were 95.40 males. For every 100 females age 18 and over, there were 93.20 males.

The median income for a household in the county was $32,405, and the median income for a family was $38,164. Males had a median income of $31,282 versus $21,172 for females. The per capita income for the county was $15,362. About 11.40% of families and 15.20% of the population were below the poverty line, including 21.50% of those under age 18 and 15.70% of those age 65 or over.

== Communities ==
=== Cities ===
- Kingsland
- Rison (county seat)

=== Census-designated places ===
- New Edinburg
- Rye
- Staves
- Woodlawn

=== Townships ===
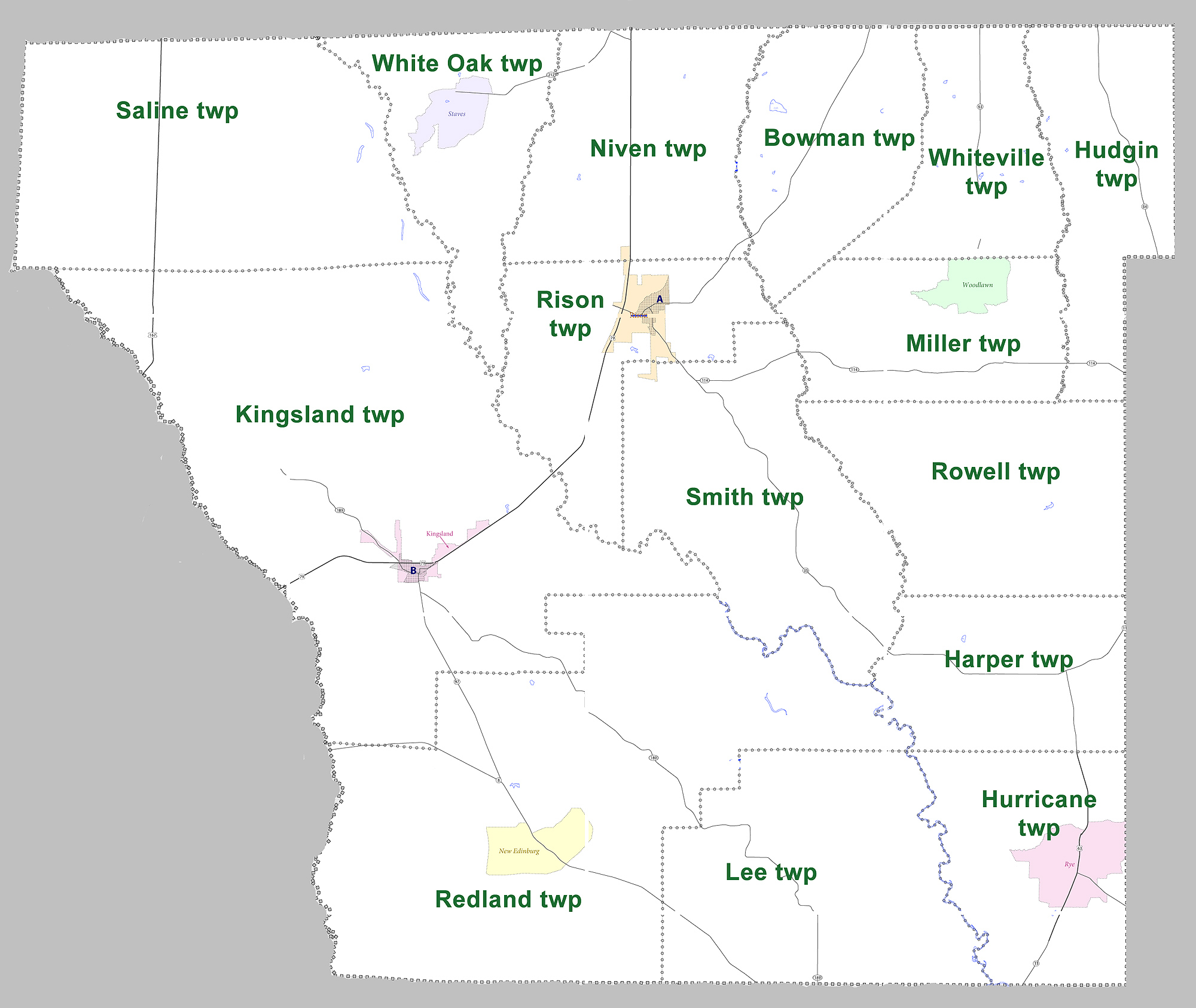
Townships in Cleveland County, Arkansas as of 2010

Townships in Arkansas are the divisions of a county. Each township includes unincorporated areas; some may have incorporated cities or towns within part of their boundaries. Arkansas townships have limited purposes in modern times. However, the United States census does list Arkansas population based on townships (sometimes referred to as "county subdivisions" or "minor civil divisions"). Townships are also of value for historical purposes in terms of genealogical research. Each town or city is within one or more townships in an Arkansas county based on census maps and publications. The townships of Cleveland County are listed below; listed in parentheses are the cities, towns, and/or census-designated places that are fully or partially inside the township.

- Bowman
- Hudgin
- Harper (Herbine)
- Hurricane (Rye)
- Kingsland (Kingsland)
- Lee
- Miller (Woodlawn)
- Niven-Jackson
- Redland (New Edinburg)
- Rison (Rison)
- Rowell
- Saline
- Smith
- White Oak (Staves)
- Whiteville (Randall)

== Government ==
=== Government ===
The county government is a constitutional body granted specific powers by the Constitution of Arkansas and the Arkansas Code. The quorum court is the legislative branch of the county government and controls all spending and revenue collection. Representatives are called justices of the peace and are elected from county districts every even-numbered year. The number of districts in a county vary from nine to fifteen, and district boundaries are drawn by the county election commission. The Cleveland County Quorum Court has nine members. Presiding over quorum court meetings is the county judge, who serves as the chief operating officer of the county. The county judge is elected at-large and does not vote in quorum court business, although capable of vetoing quorum court decisions.

Cleveland County, Arkansas Elected countywide officials
Position	Officeholder	Party
County Judge	Jimmy Cummings	Republican
County/Circuit Clerk	Brandy Herring	Republican
Sheriff	Jack H. Rodgers II	Republican
Treasurer	Angie Kimsey-Sims	Republican
Collector	Patti Wilson	Republican
Assessor	Barbara Reaves	Republican
Coroner	Chuck Valentine	Republican

The composition of the Quorum Court following the 2024 elections is 9 Republicans. Justices of the Peace (members) of the Quorum Court following the elections are:

- District 1: Ricky Neal (R)
- District 2: Melody Spears (R)
- District 3: Dwayne Ashcraft (R)
- District 4: Pat Keegan-Potter (R)
- District 5: Donnie Herring (R)
- District 6: Owen Rushing (R)
- District 7: Bruce T. Brown (R)
- District 8: Jeffrey Smith (R)
- District 9: Charles Rodgers (R)

Additionally, the townships of Cleveland County are entitled to elect their own respective constables, as set forth by the Constitution of Arkansas. Constables are largely of historical significance as they were used to keep the peace in rural areas when travel was more difficult. The township constables as of the 2024 elections are:

- Harper: Dave Morrison (D)

=== Politics ===
Cleveland County has trended heavily towards the Republican Party in recent presidential elections. The last Democrat to carry the county was Bill Clinton, an Arkansas native, in 1996.

United States presidential election results for Cleveland County, Arkansas
Year	Republican		Democratic		Third party(ies)	
Year	No.	%	No.	%	No.	%
1896	231	15.24%	1,269	83.71%	16	1.06%
1900	286	24.42%	876	74.81%	9	0.77%
1904	330	27.30%	704	58.23%	175	14.47%
1908	426	33.97%	771	61.48%	57	4.55%
1912	275	25.21%	685	62.79%	131	12.01%
1916	230	16.94%	1,128	83.06%	0	0.00%
1920	475	36.57%	809	62.28%	15	1.15%
1924	174	21.27%	613	74.94%	31	3.79%
1928	476	40.79%	690	59.13%	1	0.09%
1932	92	6.00%	1,440	93.87%	2	0.13%
1936	45	3.96%	1,088	95.77%	3	0.26%
1940	58	5.53%	989	94.37%	1	0.10%
1944	150	13.51%	960	86.49%	0	0.00%
1948	79	7.85%	679	67.50%	248	24.65%
1952	477	27.60%	1,248	72.22%	3	0.17%
1956	423	26.57%	1,149	72.17%	20	1.26%
1960	290	16.91%	1,216	70.90%	209	12.19%
1964	1,026	47.39%	1,121	51.78%	18	0.83%
1968	312	12.63%	407	16.48%	1,751	70.89%
1972	1,837	71.45%	734	28.55%	0	0.00%
1976	646	21.78%	2,320	78.22%	0	0.00%
1980	1,124	36.76%	1,856	60.69%	78	2.55%
1984	1,773	56.02%	1,378	43.54%	14	0.44%
1988	1,462	50.75%	1,404	48.73%	15	0.52%
1992	1,127	33.36%	1,893	56.04%	358	10.60%
1996	990	32.74%	1,741	57.57%	293	9.69%
2000	1,678	52.75%	1,414	44.45%	89	2.80%
2004	2,009	57.47%	1,450	41.48%	37	1.06%
2008	2,451	69.93%	911	25.99%	143	4.08%
2012	2,313	70.82%	845	25.87%	108	3.31%
2016	2,462	73.40%	723	21.56%	169	5.04%
2020	2,867	79.64%	651	18.08%	82	2.28%
2024	2,804	83.11%	524	15.53%	46	1.36%

== Education ==
School districts serving portions of the county:

- Cleveland County School District
- Malvern Special School District
- Star City School District
- Woodlawn School District

== Notable people ==
- Monroe Schwarzlose, a turkey farmer and political maverick who polled 31 percent of the vote against Governor Bill Clinton in the 1980 Democratic primary. He won in Cleveland County.
- Harvey Parnell, the 29th governor of Arkansas, 1928-1933
- Youell Swinney, the only major suspect in the Texarkana Phantom slayings, hailed from Cleveland County. He was the son of a Baptist minister.
- Coach Paul "Bear" Bryant was born in Moro Bottom.
- Tyrell Johnson plays safety in the NFL was born and raised in Rison.

== See also ==
- List of lakes in Cleveland County, Arkansas
- National Register of Historic Places listings in Cleveland County, Arkansas
