= List of mayors of places in Arkansas =

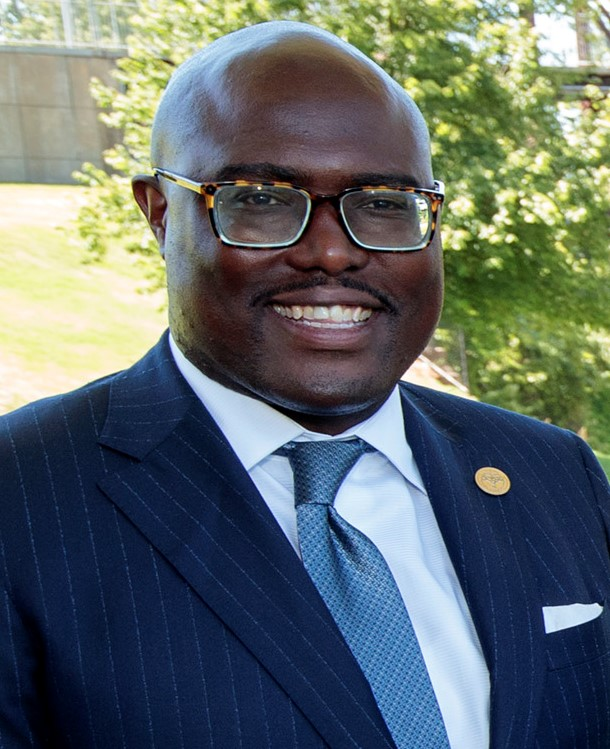
Frank Scott Jr. is the mayor of Little Rock, Arkansas' capital and largest city.

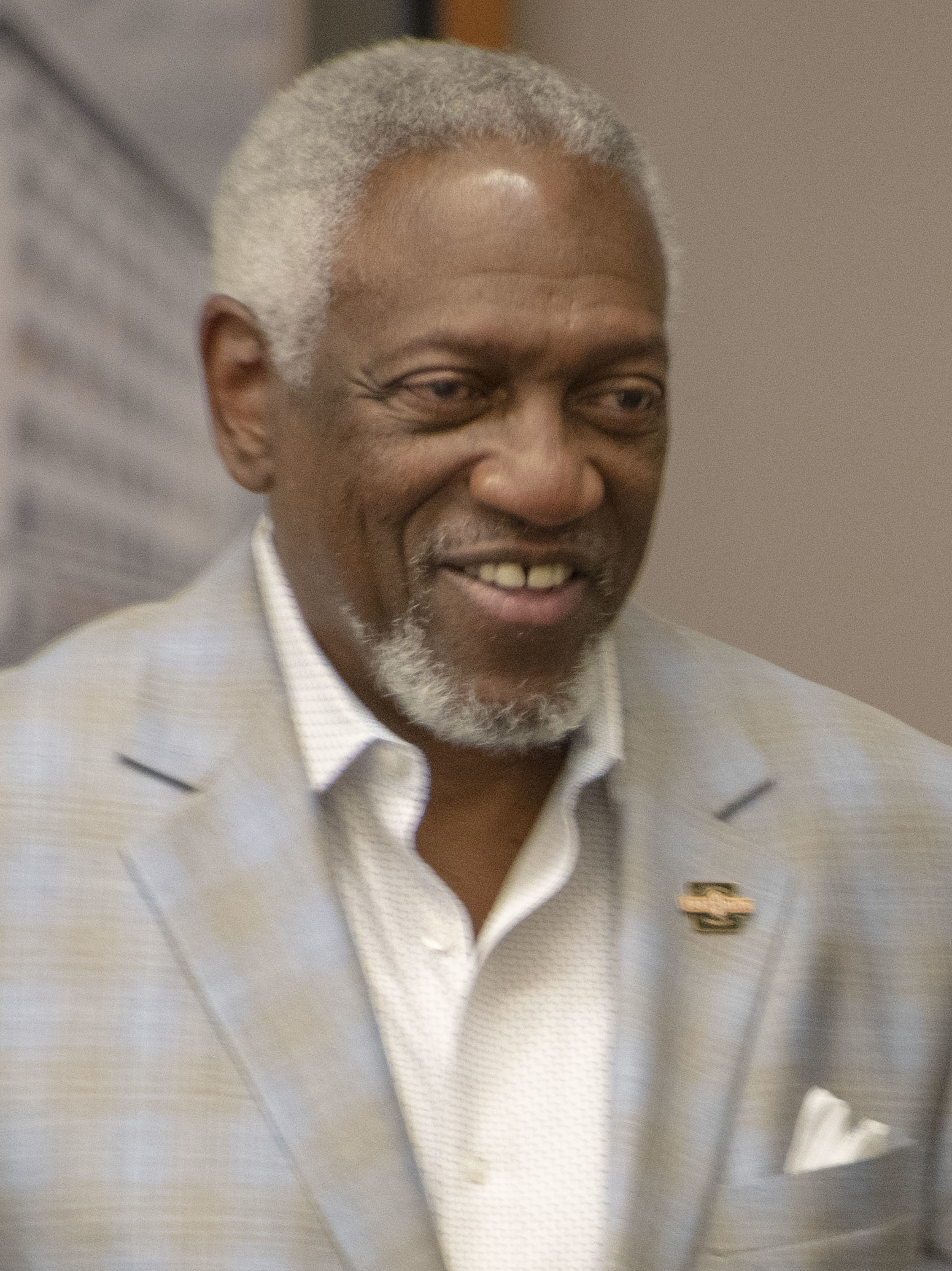
George McGill was elected mayor of Fort Smith in 2018. He is the city's first Black mayor.

This is a list of mayors of the 25 largest cities in the U.S. state of Arkansas. Municipal elections in Arkansas are nonpartisan.

== Mayors of cities in Arkansas ==
Incumbent mayors of the 25 largest cities in Arkansas
Rank	City	Mayor	Serving since	Ref.
1	Little Rock	Frank Scott Jr.	January 1, 2019	
2	Fayetteville	Molly Rawn	January 1, 2025	
3	Fort Smith	George McGill	January 1, 2019	
4	Springdale	Doug Sprouse	January 1, 2009	
5	Jonesboro	Harold Copenhaver	January 1, 2021	
6	Rogers	Greg Hines	January 1, 2011	
7	Conway	Bart Castleberry	January 1, 2017	
8	North Little Rock	Terry C. Hartwick	January 1, 2021	
9	Bentonville	Stephanie Orman	January 1, 2021	
10	Pine Bluff	Vivian Flowers	January 1, 2025	
11	Hot Springs	Pat McCabe	January 1, 2023	
12	Benton	Tom Farmer	January 1, 2019	
13	Sherwood	Mary Jo Heye-Townsell	January 1, 2023	
14	Bella Vista	John D. Flynn	January 1, 2023	
15	Paragould	Josh Agee	January 1, 2021	
16	Jacksonville	Jeff Elmore	January 1, 2023	
17	Texarkana	Allen Brown	January 1, 2019	
18	Russellville	Fred Teague	January 1, 2023	
19	Cabot	Ken Kincade	January 1, 2019	
20	West Memphis	Marco McClendon	January 1, 2019	
21	Van Buren	Joseph Hurst	January 1, 2019	
22	Searcy	Mat Faulkner	January 1, 2023	
23	Bryant	Chris Treat	March 15, 2024	
24	Maumelle	Caleb Norris	January 1, 2019	
25	Centerton	Bill Edwards		

== Lists of mayors ==
- Bentonville
- Conway
- Fayetteville
- Fort Smith
- Jonesboro
- Little Rock
- North Little Rock
- Rogers
- Springdale

== Notable mayors ==
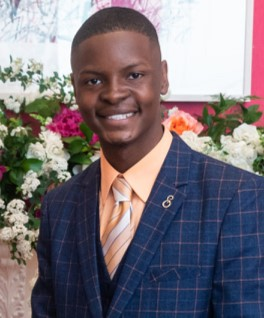
Jaylen Smith of Earle

- Lottie Shackelford (D–Little Rock) – First female mayor of Little Rock, serving from 1987 to 1988
- Jaylen Smith (D–Earle) – Youngest incumbent mayor in the US and youngest Black mayor in United States history, elected at age 18 in 2022
