= List of mayors of Cookeville, Tennessee =

City of Cookeville, Tennessee mayors

The following is a list of mayors of the city of Cookeville, Tennessee, United States of America.

- John Byrd Dow, c. 1912–1913
- Oscar K. Holladay, c. 1913–1917
- William A. Hensley, c.1924
- Ezra Davis, c.1929
- D.S. Mahler, c.1949
- Dero Arlos Brown, c. 1951 – 1960
- W.M. Mann, c. 1960 – 1961
- Luke Medley, c. 1963 – 1966
- Robert C. Davis, c. 1970 – 1971
- Robert Poteet, c. 1973 – 1976
- Walter Fitzpatrick Sr., c. 1980 – 1981
- Dwight Henry, c. 1985–1988
- Tony Stone, c.1990
- Jean Davis, c. 1995 – 1996
- Charles Womack, c. 1998–2006
- Sam Sallee, c. 2008 – 2010
- Ricky Shelton, c. 2015
- Laurin Wheaton, c. 2024
- Chad Gilbert, c. 2026

== See also ==
- Cookeville history
