= List of mayors of Dover, New Hampshire =

Mayors of the city of Dover, New Hampshire, USA

The following is a list of mayors of the city of Dover, New Hampshire, United States.

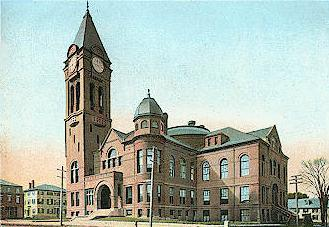
Dover city hall building, New Hampshire, USA, circa 1900s

- Andrew Pierce, 1856
- Thomas E. Sawyer, 1857
- James Bennett, 1858–1859
- Albert Bond, 1860
- Alphonso Bickford, 1861–1862
- William E. Estes, 1863–1865
- Joshua G. Hall, 1866–1867
- Eli V. Brewster, 1868–1869
- William S. Stevens, 1870–1872
- Charles H. Horton, 1873–1874
- Edward P. Hodgdon, 1875–1876
- Solomon H. Foye, 1877–1878
- Joseph Dame Guppey, 1879–1880
- Charles M. Murphy, 1881–1882
- James E. Lathrop, 1883–1884
- Richard N. Ross, 1885–1886
- George G. Lowell, 1887–1888
- B. Frank Nealley, 1889–1890
- Henry R. Parker, 1891–1892
- Alonzo Melvin Foss, 1893–1895
- William F. Nason, 1896–1897
- Charles A. Fairbanks, 1898–1900
- Arthur G. Whittemore, 1901–1903
- John Haven Nealley, 1904–1905
- Alonzo T. Pinkham, 1906
- George J. Foster, 1906, 1909–1910
- Michael J. White, 1907–1908
- Dwight Hall, 1911–1912
- Charles H. Foss, 1913–1914
- George D. Barrett, 1915–1916
- Fred N. Beckwith, 1917
- Alonzo G. Willand, 1917
- Frederick C. Smalley, 1918–1919
- Alvah T. Ramsdell, 1920–1921
- Charles G. Waldron, 1922–1924
- John W. Morrison, 1925
- Charles E. T. Caswell, 1926–1928
- T. Jewett Chesley, 1929–1933
- F. Clyde Keefe, 1934–1935, 1942–1947
- James P. Keenan, 1936–1937
- Dennis M. McDonough, 1938
- Samuel B. Blair, 1938–1941
- Caroll Elliott Hall, 1947
- Maurice J. Murphy, 1953
- Thomas H. Keenan, 1954
- Stuart N. Shaines, ca.1962
- Wil Boc, 1998–2001
- Alexander Nossiff, ca.2003
- Scott Myers, ca.2004–2009
- Karen Weston, ca.2016–2017
- Robert Carrier, ca.2024
- Dennis Shanahan, 2026–Present

== See also ==
- Dover history
