= List of mayors of Springdale, Arkansas =

The following is a list of mayors of the city of Springdale, Arkansas, United States.

== Mayors ==
- Joseph Holcombe, c. 1878, 1883
- Millard Berry, c. 1889
- C.J. Chapman, c. 1899
- I.T. Lane, c. 1905–1908, 1914–1916
- J.A. Joyce, c. 1909
- L.A. Smith, c. 1916–1918
- H. R. Sharp, c. 1952–1953
- Hugh O. Sherry, c. 1954–1959
- Charles N. McKinney, c. 1979–1998
- Jerre M. Van Hoose, 2000–c. 2008
- Doug Sprouse, 2009–present

== See also ==
- Springdale history
- List of mayors of places in Arkansas
