= List of mayors of Rogers, Arkansas =

The following is a list of mayors of the city of Rogers, Arkansas, United States.

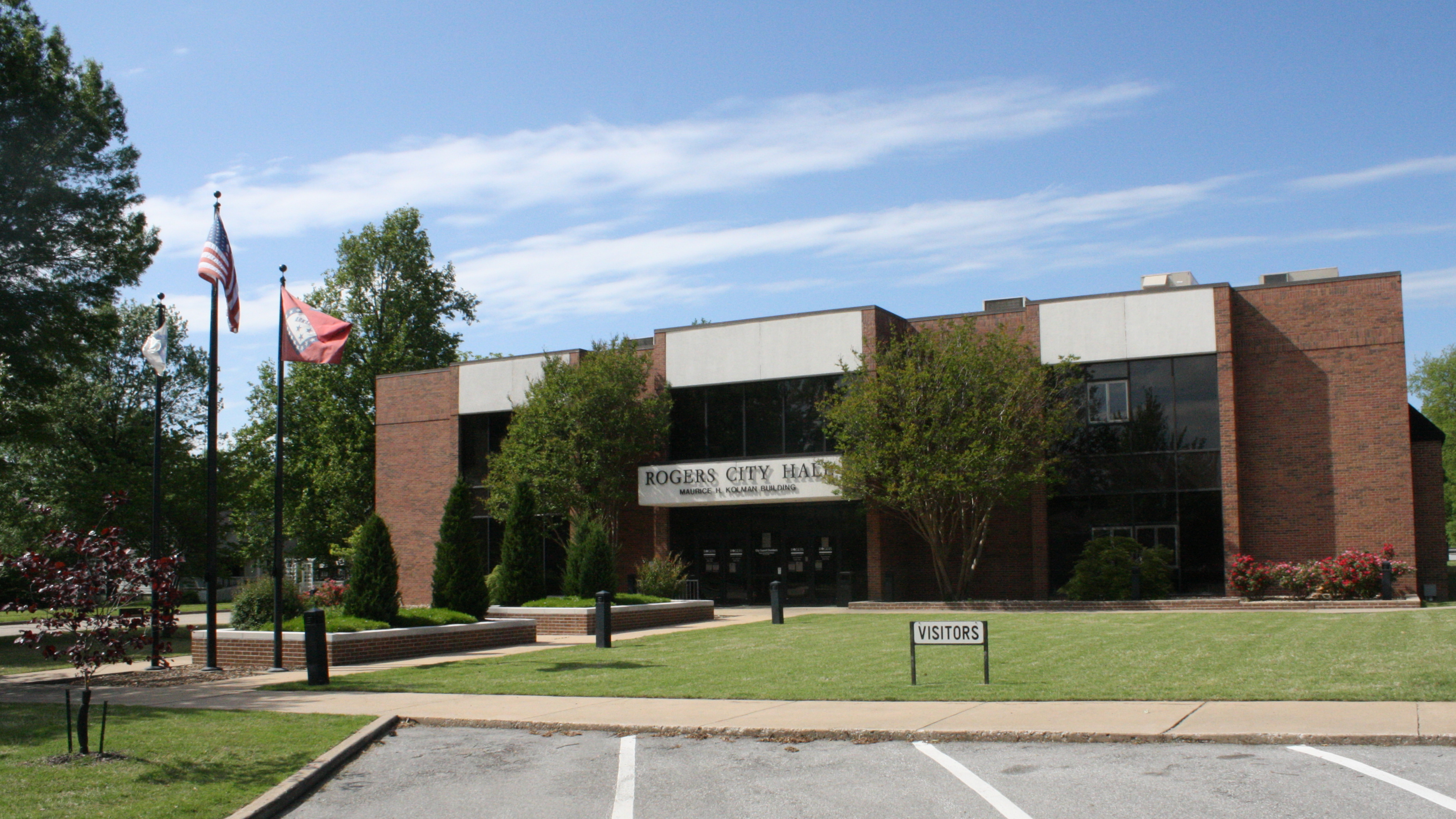
City hall building in Rogers, Arkansas (photo 2020)

- John B. Steele, c.1885
- E.R. Morgan, c.1899
- Richard L. Nance
- Jay Dalton
- W.F. Roselle, c.1912-1913
- Frank W. May, c.1913
- J.O. Jones, c.1914
- John W. Nance, c.1918
- Henry U. Funk, c.1918
- Ernest Worner Vinson, 1932-1943
- J. Frank Smith, 1944-1946, 1954-1955
- Robert Leroy Vogt, 1947-1953
- William Harold Roberts, 1956-1959
- William Seward Puckett, 1960-1963
- Ed M. Bautts, 1964-1974
- Harry Smith, 1975-1978
- Jack Cole, 1979-1981
- John Sampier, 1981-1998
- Steve Womack, 1999-2011
- Greg Hines, 2011-present

== See also ==
- Rogers history
- List of mayors of places in Arkansas
