= List of mayors of Bath, Maine =

The following is a list of mayors and council presidents of the city of Bath, Maine, United States.

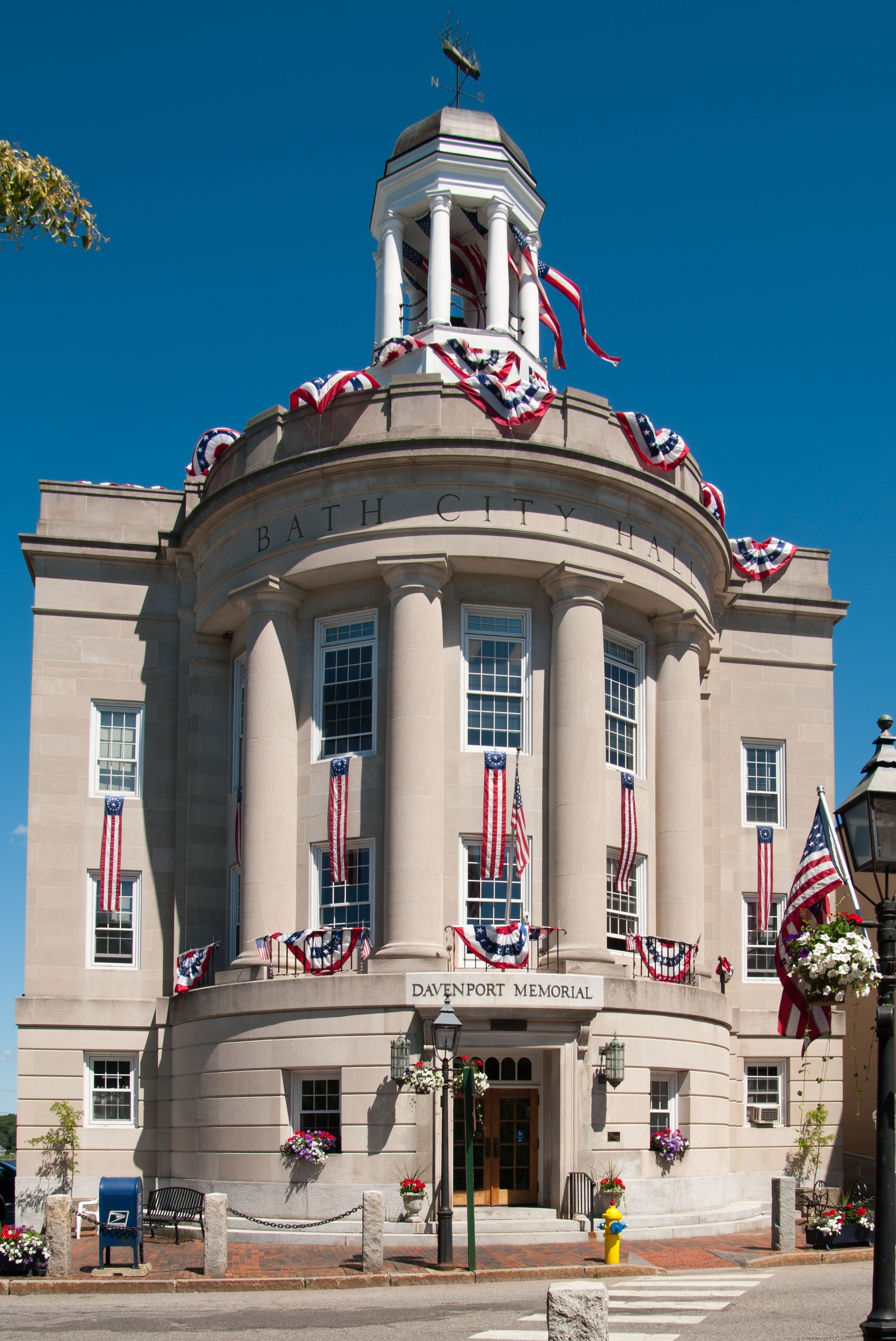
View of City Hall building on Front Street in Bath, Maine, 2012

== Mayors ==
- David C. Magoun, 1848
- Freeman H. Morse, 1849–1850, 1855
- John Patten, 1851-1852
- Bernard C. Bailey, 1853-1854
- William Rice, 1856-1858
- Israel Putnam, 1859–1865, 1867
- John Hayden, 1866
- James T. Patten, 1868-1869
- S. D. Bailey, 1870
- J. D. Robinson, 1871-1872
- William Rice, 1873-1875
- Edwin Reed, 1876-1877
- John G. Richardson, 1878-1879
- Thomas W. Hyde, 1880-1881
- James C. Ledyard, 1882-1883
- Geo. H. Nichols, 1884
- Jas. W. Wakefield, 1885–1888, 1894
- Geo. Moulton Jr., 1889
- Chas. E. Patten, 1890
- Fritz H. Twitchell, 1891-1892
- John O. Shaw, 1893
- Randall D. Bibber, 1895-1897
- Joseph Torrey, 1898, 1922
- Chas. E. Hyde, 1899-1900
- Samuel R. Percy, 1901
- Edward W. Hyde, 1902-1904
- Elwell S. Crosby, 1905
- D. Howard Spear, 1906
- Geo. E. Hughes, 1907-1908
- John S. Hyde, 1909-1910
- Frank A. Small, 1911-1912
- Edward W. Larrabee, 1913
- Arthur J. Dunton, 1914
- John A. Small, 1915-1917
- J. Edward Drake, 1918-1919
- Charles H. Cahill, 1920-1921
- Oliver Moses, 1923
- Allen M. Irish, 1924
- George W. Dean, ca.1925-1926
- Charles H. Cahill, ca.1926-1929
- Harold P. Small, ca.1930-1932, 1934
- John A. Lord, ca.1933
- Arthur Sewall, ca.1935-1937, 1939
- Donald N. Small, ca.1938
- Robert H. Haskell, ca.1940
- Walter C. Rogers, ca.1941-1945
- Dominique J. Tardif, 1946-1947
- Donald N. Small, 1947

== City council presidents ==
- John Hall, ca.1998
- Mary Ellen Bell, ca.2024

== See also ==
- Bath history
