= List of mayors of Odessa, Texas =

The following is a list of mayors of the city of Odessa, Texas, United States.

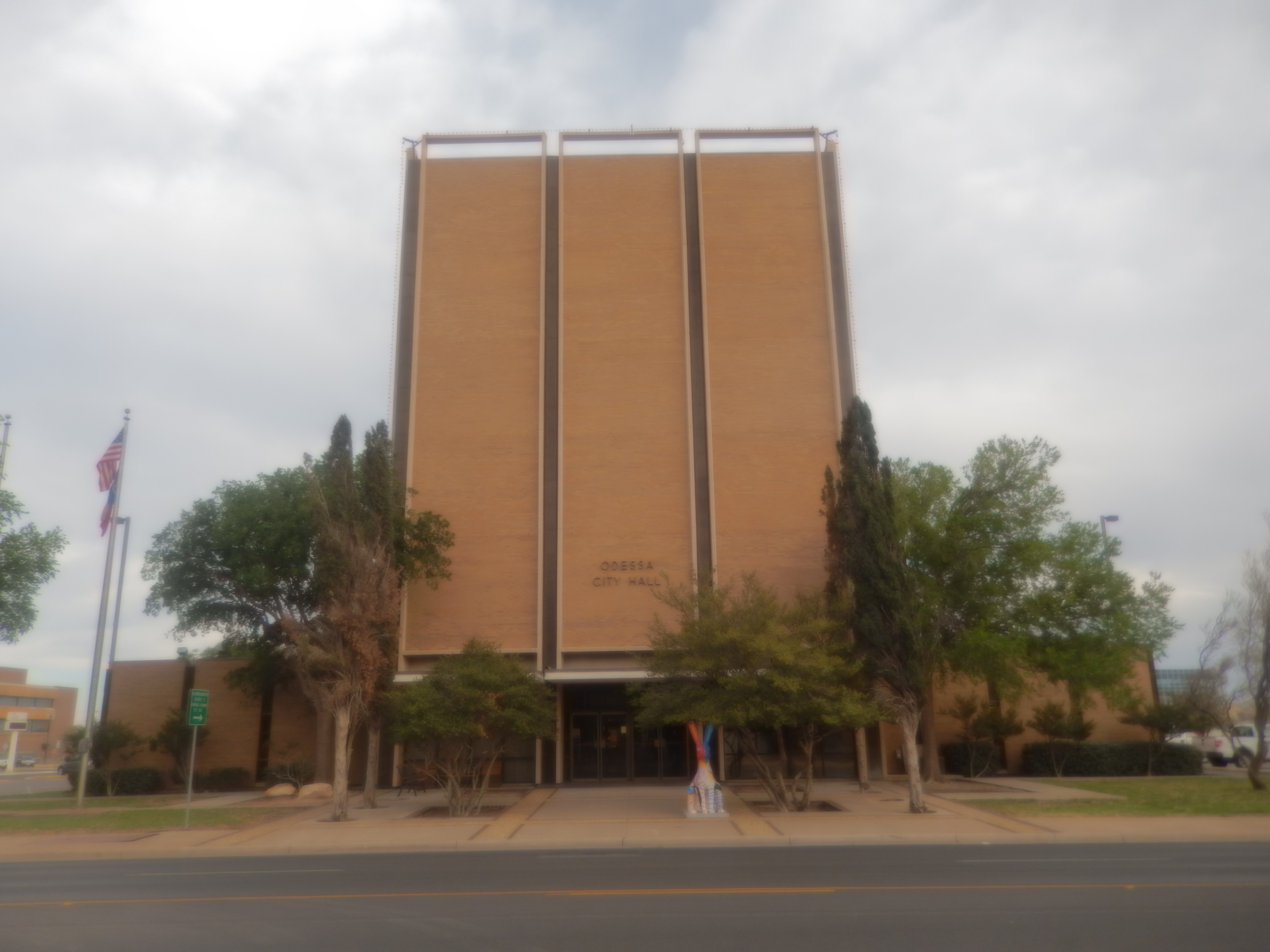
City hall building in Odessa, Texas (photo 2014)

- S.R. McKinney, 1927-1932
- V.C. Wiggins, 1932-1938
- E.L. Farmer, 1938-1941
- R. T. Waddell, 1941-1944
- A. J. Burks, 1944-1946
- E. G. Rodman, 1946-1948
- A. P. Brown, 1948-1950
- C. W. McCollum, 1950-1952
- Fred C. Gage, 1952-1954
- Harold R. Downs, 1954-1960
- J. T. Clark, 1960-1962
- Preston Parker, 1962-1968
- Jim Reese, 1968-1974
- Dan Hemphill, 1974-1978
- M. R. "Dick" McManigle Jr., 1978-1980
- Bob Bryant, 1980-1984
- John B. Minor, 1984-1986
- Don Carter, 1986-1990
- Lorraine Perryman, 1990-1996
- Mike Atkins, 1996-2000
- Bill Hext, 2000-2001
- Larry Melton, 2001-2012
- David R. Turner, 2012-2020
- Javier Joven, 2020-2024
- Cal Hendrick, 2024-Present

== See also ==
- Odessa history
