= List of mayors of Fort Smith, Arkansas =

Mayor of Fort Smith, Arkansas
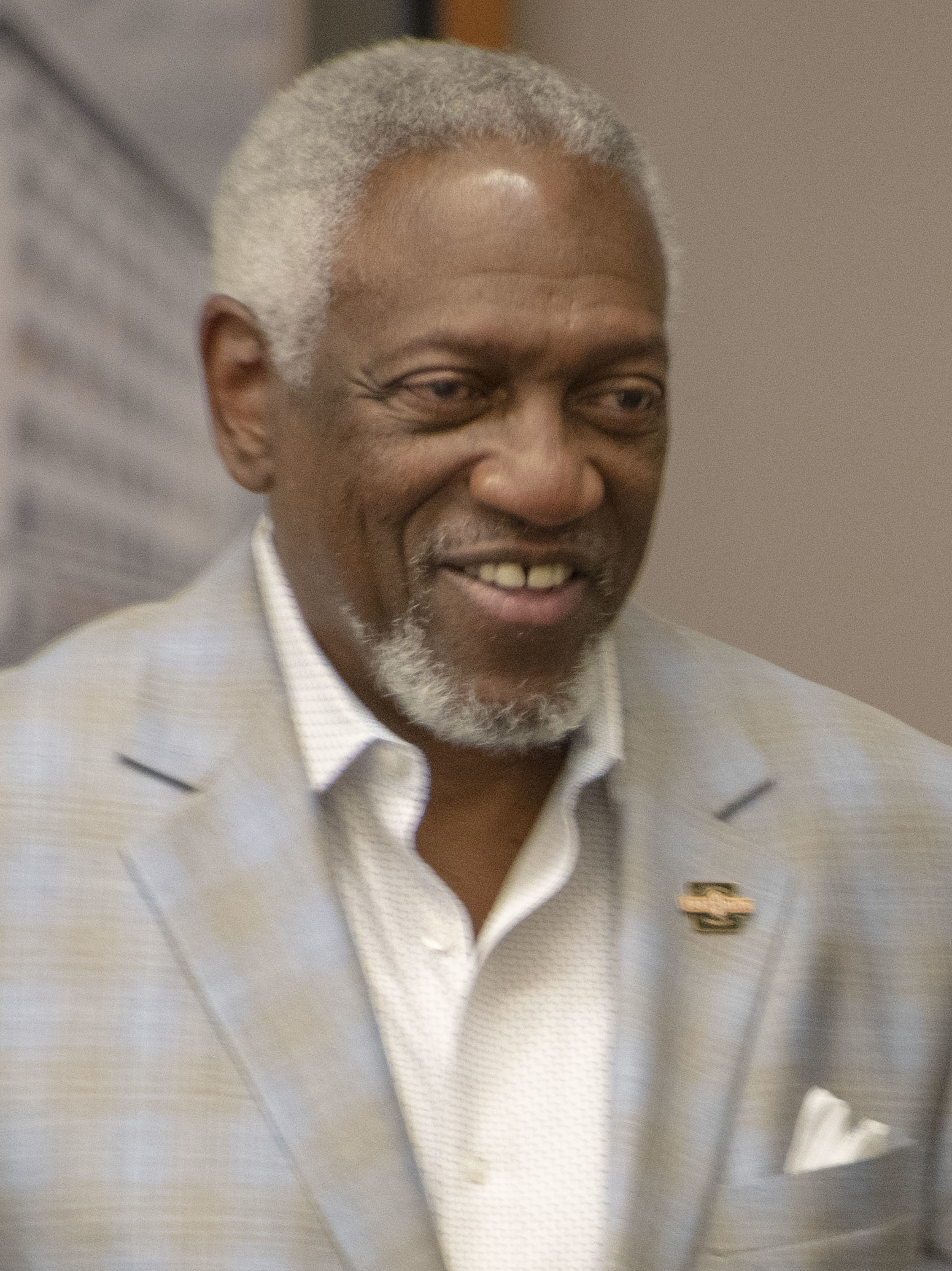
- Incumbent; George McGill since January 1, 2019
- Term length: 4 years
- First holder: C. M. Hudspeth

The following is a list of mayors of the city of Fort Smith, Arkansas, United States.

- C. M. Hudspeth, 1841
- Joseph H. Heard, 1843-1845
- Smith Elkins, 1845
- George S. Birnie, 1846-1848
- W. J. Weaver, 1849
- Nicholas Spring, 1850
- Marshall Grimes, 1851
- Mitchell Sparks, 1852
- R. P. Pulliam, 1853
- John F. Wheeler, 1854
- W. H. Rogers, 1855
- R. M. Johnson, 1856, 1860, 1864, 1875
- John Beckel, 1857
- Joseph J. Walton, 1858
- Francis H. Wolf, 1859, 1865
- J. K. McKenzie, 1861
- Joseph Bennett, 1862-1863
- John Stryker, 1866-1868
- E. J. Brooks, 1869-1872, 1874
- I. W. Fuller, 1872-1873
- J. R. Kannady, 1873-1874
- Mont H. Sandels, 1876-1877
- James Brizzolara, 1878-1882
- J. Henry Carnall, 1883-1885
- Mat Gray, 1886
- Samuel A. Williams, 1887-1888
- Daniel Baker, 1889-1890
- C. M. Cooke, 1891-1892
- J. A. Hoffman, 1893-1896
- Tom Ben Garrett, 1897-1902
- Henry Kuper Jr., 1903-1906
- Fagan Bourland, 1907-1908, 1911-1913, 1921-1923, 1929-1933
- W. J. Johnston, 1909-1911
- Henry C. Read, 1913-1917
- John H. Wright, 1917
- Arch Monro, 1917-1921
- D. L. Ford, 1923-1925
- J. H. Parker, 1925-1929
- J. K. Jordan, 1933-1941
- Chester Holland, 1941-1945
- Jack Pace, 1945-1952, 1957-1961
- H. R. Hestand, 1952-1957
- Bob Brooksher, 1961-1964
- James Yarbrough, 1964-1967
- Jack Freeze, 1967-1983
- William D. Vines, 1984-1990
- C. Ray Baker Jr., 1991-2010
- Sandy Sanders, 2011-2018
- George B. McGill, 2019–present

== See also ==
- Sebastian County Courthouse-Fort Smith City Hall
- Fort Smith history
- List of mayors of places in Arkansas
