= List of mayors of Loveland, Colorado =

The following is a list of mayors of the city of Loveland, Colorado, United States.

- J.M. Aldrich, c.1881
- John Lewis Herzinger, c.1888
- Lucas Brandt, c.1894
- G.A. Lloyd, c.1897?
- John M. Cunningham, c.1902
- George C. Briggs, c.1904
- B.R. Bonnell, c.1906?
- Harry E. Kelly, c.1906-1909
- James W. McMullen, c.1911
- O.D. Shields, c.1913
- T.R. Norcross, c.1915
- Archibald Foster, c.1919
- George W. Foster, c.1921
- W.E. Banks, c.1923
- Elmer M. Ivers, 1931-1934, 1955-1959
- Houston H. Markley, 1947-1951
- Ed Garrett Sr., 1951-1955
- Bob Hipps, 1959-1961
- Ray Patterson, 1961-1967
- Dennis Garrett, 1967-1969
- Jean Gaines, c.1971
- Herm Smith, 1988-1992
- Treva Edwards, c.1996
- Kathleen Gilliland, c.1999-2005
- Cecil Gutierrez, 2009-2017
- Jacki Marsh, c.2017-2025
- Patrick McFall, c.2025-present

== See also ==
- Loveland history
