= List of mayors of Nome, Alaska =

The following is a list of mayors of the city of Nome, Alaska, United States.

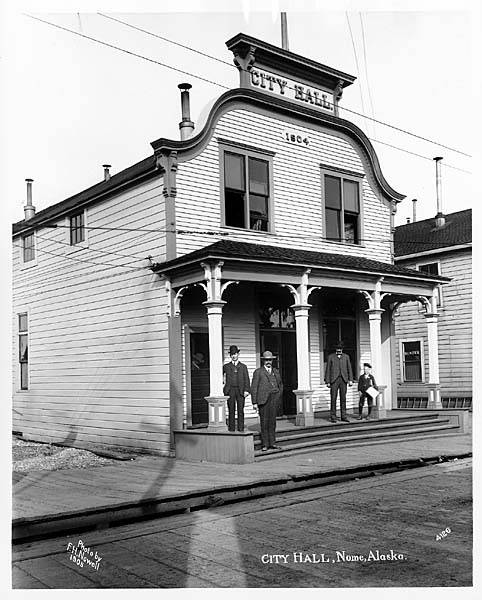
City hall building in Nome, Alaska, c.1905

- Thomas D. Cashel, c.1899
- J. F. Giese, c.1901
- A.L. Valentine, c.1902
- W. H. Bard, c.1902
- John Rustgard, c.1903
- H. P. King, c.1904
- John S. Coply, c.1905
- W. H. Pearson, c.1906
- G. B. Baldwin, c.1907
- Conrad Freeding, c.1908
- O. D. Cochran, c.1909
- William A. Gilmore, c.1911
- George A. Jones, c.1913
- George B. Grigsby, c.1914
- George A. Diamond, c.1915
- A. G. Blake, c.1916
- G. L. Lomen, c.1917-1919
- Geo. Maynard, c.1923
- A. Bahlke, 1930-1931
- A. F. Wright, 1931-1933
- Ed Tarnutzer, 1933-1934
- Rex F. Swartz, 1934-1936
- Ed Seidenverg, 1936-1946
- Alvin Polson, 1938-1939
- Fred Kubon, 1939-1941
- Edward Anderson, 1941-1945
- Luther Dunbar, 1946-1949
- Charles D. Jones, 1951-1953
- Steffen Andersen, 1949-1966
- Donald M. Hoover, 1962-1963
- Roscoe J. Wilke, 1961-1965
- Allan G. Doyle, 1966-1969
- Donald E. Perkins, 1969-1971
- Robert Renshaw, 1971-1977
- Leo B. Rasmussen, 1977–1985, 2000-2003
- John K. Handeland, 1985–2000, 2020-2025
- Denise Michels, 2003-2015
- Richard Beneville, 2015-2020
- Kenny Hughes, 2025–present

== See also ==
- Nome history
