= List of mayors of Altoona, Pennsylvania =

The following is a list of mayors of the city of Altoona, Pennsylvania, United States.

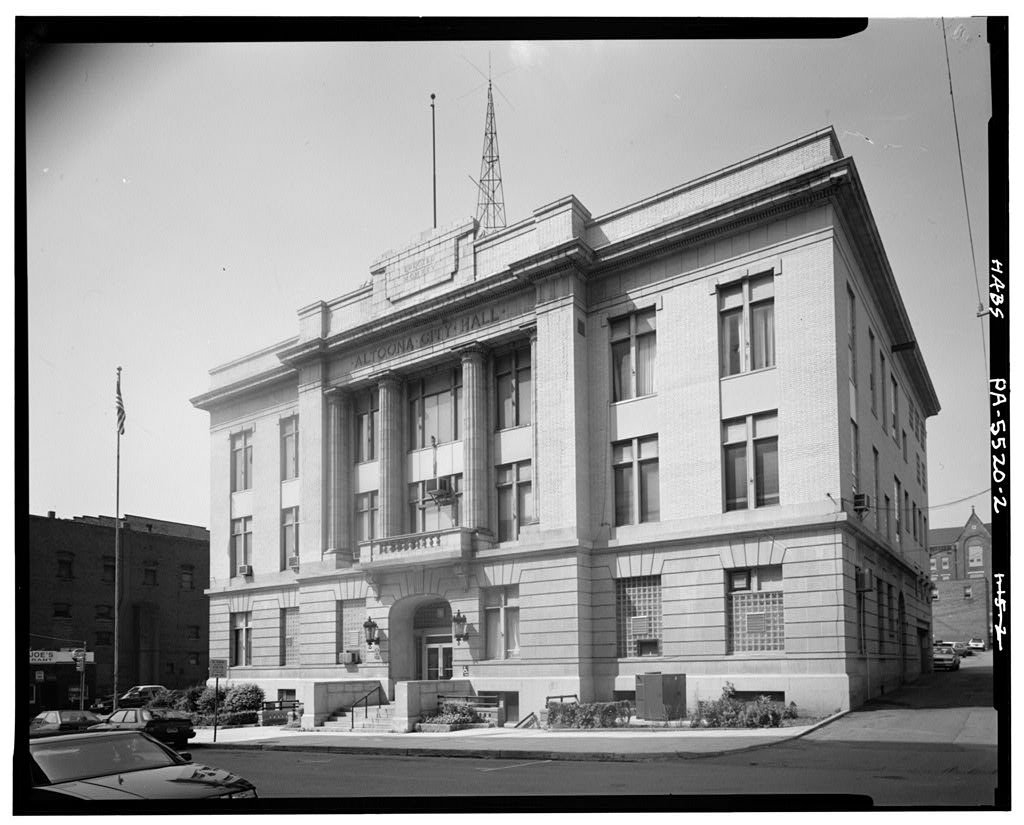
City hall building in Altoona, Pennsylvania; built in 1927 (photo 20th c.)

- George Potts, 1868-1872
- David Kinch, 1872-1874
- D. A. Gilland, 1874-1878
- Thomas Hurd, 1878-1880
- W. T. Howard, 1880-1884
- Charles J. Mann, 1884-1886
- Samuel J. Breth, 1886-1888
- E. H. Turner, 1888-1890
- Theo. Burchfield, 1890-1893
- Samual M. Hoyer, 1893-1896, 1902-1905, 1908-1911
- H. C. Barr, 1896-1899
- E. F. Giles, 1899-1902
- S. H. Walker, 1905-1908, c.1911-1913
- Charles E. Rhodes, c.1920
- Ellsworth F. Giles, c.1927
- John J. McMurray, c.1929-1933
- J. Harry Moser, c.1935-1937
- J. Lester Laughlin 1950-1951
- Walter H. Grove, c.1952-1955
- Robert W. Anthony, c.1956
- Roy F. Thompson, 1960-1964
- William H. Prosser, c.1964
- Andronic Pappas, c.1971
- William C. Stouffer, c.1972-1979
- Allan G. Hancock, 1980-1983
- David Jannetta, c.1986-1987
- Thomas C. Martin, c.1998-2006
- Wayne Hippo, c.2006-2010
- Bill Schirf, 2010-2013
- Matt Pacifico, 2014-present

== See also ==
- Altoona history
