= 2024 Fayetteville mayoral election =

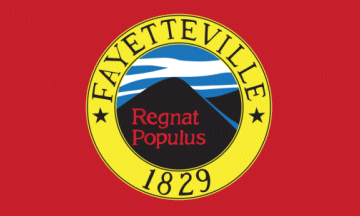
- November 5, 2024 (first round); December 3, 2024 (runoff)
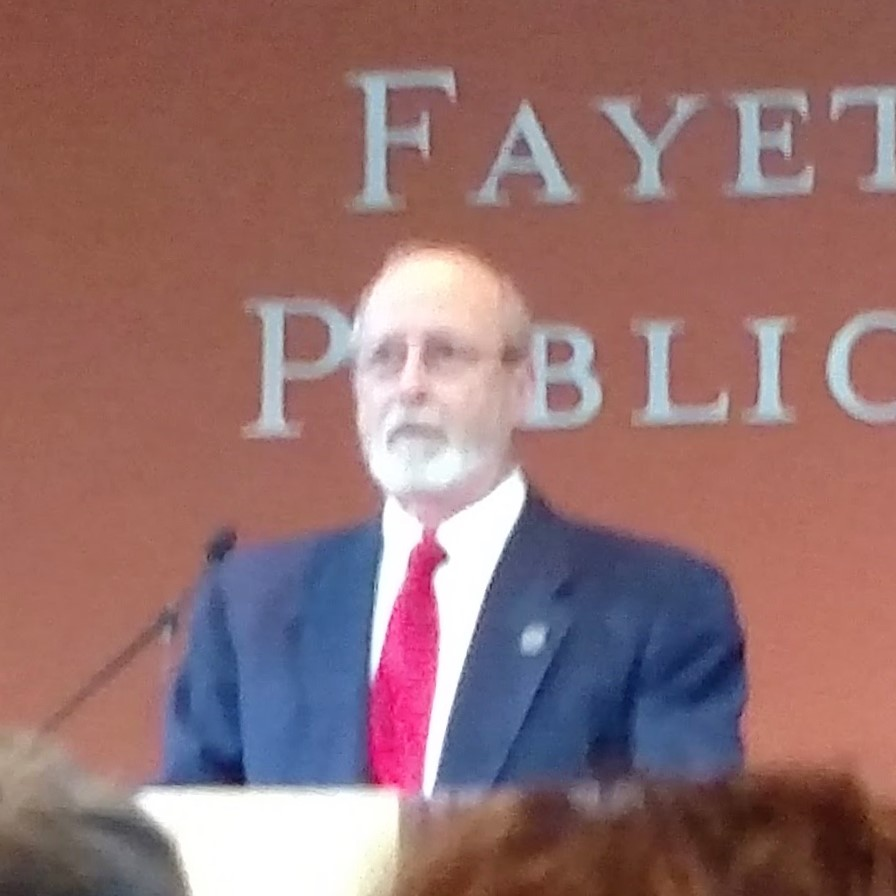

Candidate	Molly Rawn	Lioneld Jordan	Tom Terminella
First round	13,068; 36.92%	16,609; 46.92%	4,386; 12.39%
Runoff	5,411; 51.24%	5,149; 48.76%	Eliminated
Incumbent Mayor
Lioneld Jordan
Independent

The 2024 Fayetteville mayoral election was held on November 5, 2024, to elect the mayor of Fayetteville, Arkansas. The Fayetteville mayor serves a 4-year term and there are no term limits on this position. Incumbent mayor Lioneld Jordan ran for re-election to serve a fifth term in office.

Jordan, along with Experience Fayetteville CEO Molly Rawn, advanced to a runoff election to be held on December 3, 2024.

In the December 3 runoff, Molly Rawn defeated Mayor Jordan by just over 2%.

== Candidates ==
=== Declared ===
- Lioneld Jordan, incumbent
- Molly Rawn, the executive director of the city's Advertising and Promotion Commission and CEO of Experience Fayetteville
- Adam Fire Cat
- Tom Terminella

== Results ==
=== General election ===
2024 Fayetteville, Arkansas mayoral general election
Candidate	Votes	%
Lioneld Jordan (incumbent)	16,609	46.92
Molly Rawn	13,068	36.92
Tom Terminella	4,386	12.39
Adam Fire Cat	1,332	3.76
Total votes	37,421	100.0

=== Runoff ===
2024 Fayetteville, Arkansas mayoral general election
Candidate	Votes	%
Molly Rawn	5,411	51.24%
Lioneld Jordan (incumbent)	5,149	48.76%
