= List of mayors of Yuma, Arizona =

City of Yuma, Arizona mayors

The following is a list of mayors of the city of Yuma, Arizona, United States.

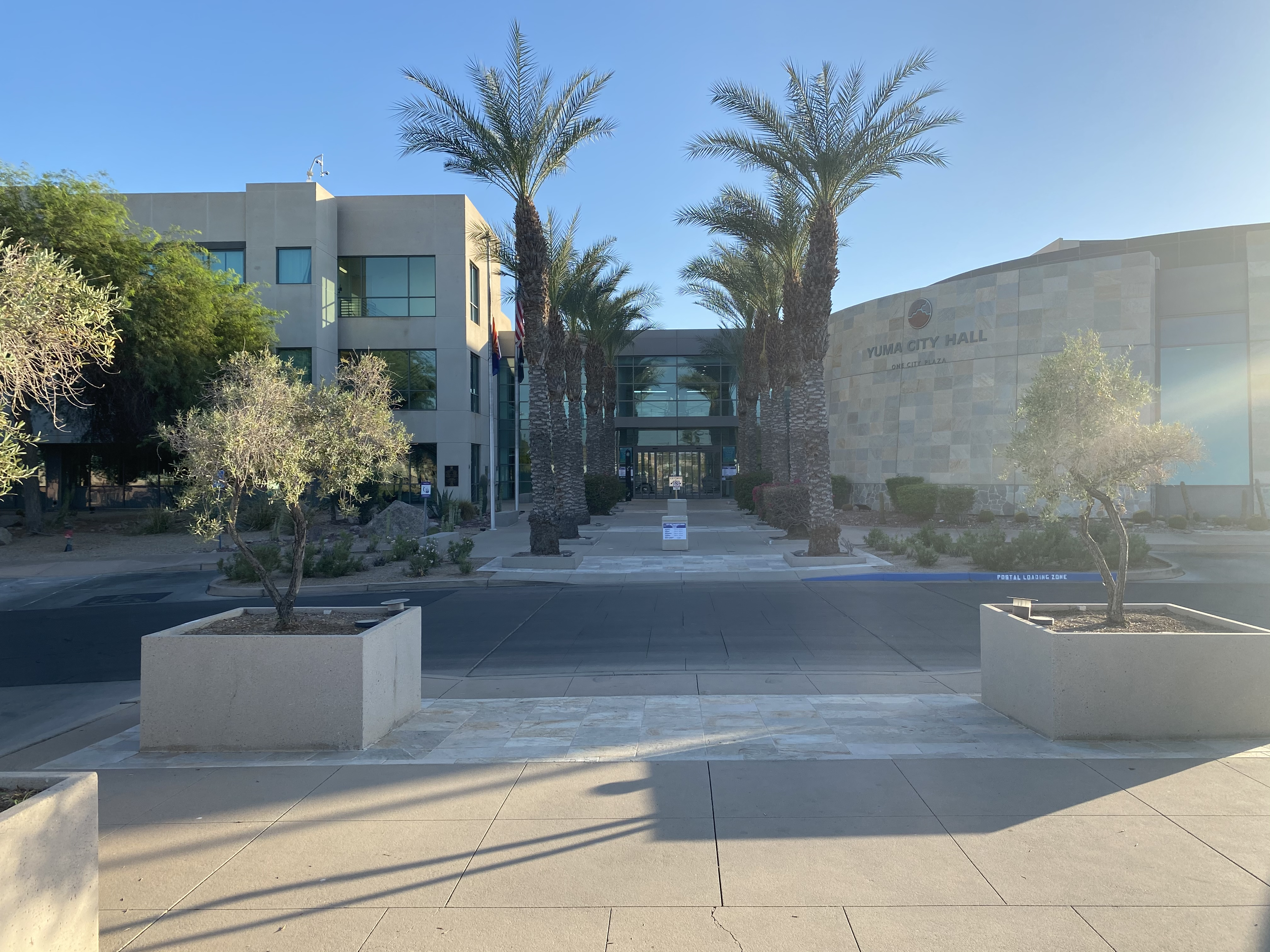
Yuma City Hall building in 2020

- Abraham Frank, ca.1893
- Frank Ewing, 1910–1912
- J. Homer Smith, ca.1919
- Frank S. Ming, ca.1926
- W. J. Anderson, ca.1952–1954
- Hugh Faulds, ca.1955–1958
- George E. Shackleford, ca.1959–1960
- Thomas F. Allt, ca.1963
- Philip G. Clark, ca.1983
- Marilyn R. Young, ca.1998–1999
- Lawrence (Larry) K. Nelson, ca.2003–2009
- Alan L. Krieger, 2010-2014
- Douglas J. Nicholls, 2014–present

== See also ==
- Yuma history
