= List of mayors of New Braunfels, Texas =

The following is a list of mayors of the city of New Braunfels, Texas, United States.

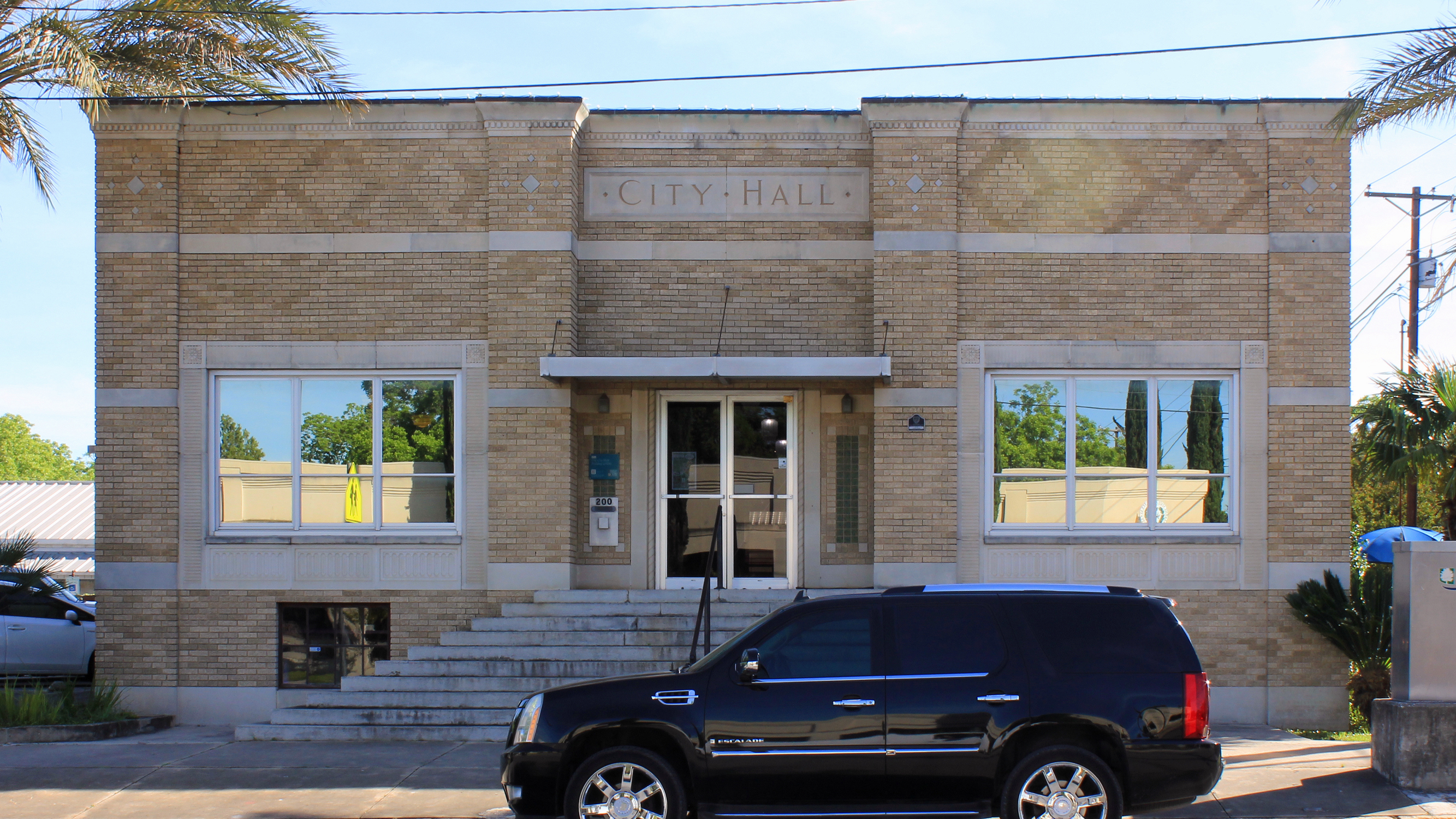
City hall building in New Braunfels, Texas (photo 2014)

- C.A. Jahn, c.1908
- Ferdinand Blumberg, 1924-1926
- Hilmar Triesch, 1926-1932
- Hilmar Fischer, 1932-1938
- Walter Sippel, 1938-1942
- A.D. Nuhn, 1942-1952
- Julius Schwandt, 1952-1956, 1966
- Joseph Faust, 1956-1962
- Harry Alves, 1962-1966
- Elliott Knox, 1967
- Jack Ohlrich, 1967-1971
- Stanley Woodward, 1971-1972
- Jack Kyle, 1972-1973
- Bill Brown, 1973-1975
- George Erben, 1975-1977, 1987-1988
- Margaret Naegelin, 1977-1978
- Wilbur Amacher, 1978-1979
- Donnie Seay, 1979-1980
- Max Winkler, 1980-1981
- O.A. Stratemann Jr., 1981-1984
- Barbara Tieken, 1984-1986
- Edward Sciantarelli, 1986-1987
- Doug Miller, 1988-1990
- Arno Becker, 1990-1991
- James Goodbread, 1991
- Clinton Brandt, 1991-1993
- Rudy Seidel, 1993-1994
- Paul Fraser Jr., 1994-1996
- Jan Kennady, 1996-1999
- Stone R. "Stoney" Williams, 1999-2002
- Adam Cork, 2002-2005
- Bruce Boyer, 2005-2011
- Gale Pospisil, 2011-2014
- Barron Casteel, 2014-2020
- Rusty Brockman, 2020-2023
- Neal Linnartz, 2023-2026
- Michael French, 2026-present

== See also ==
- New Braunfels history
