= List of mayors of Temple, Texas =

The following is a list of mayors of the city of Temple, Texas, United States.

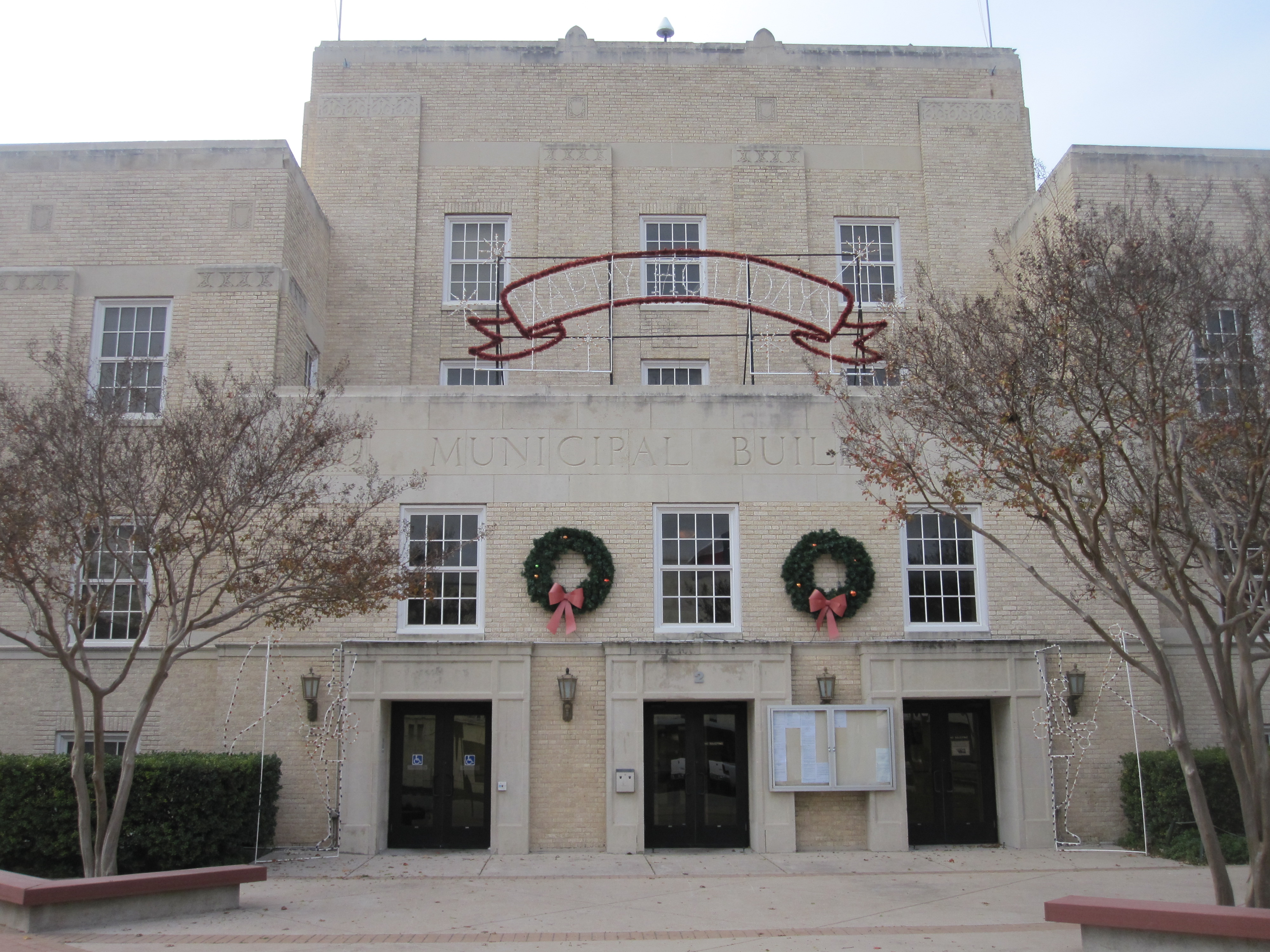
Municipal Building in Temple, Texas (photo 2009)

- Fred P. Hamill, c.1908-1911
- J.B. Watters
- Fred K. Stroop
- J.K. Campbell, c.1916
- Roy R. Campbell, c.1922
- W. S. Sealy, c.1937
- Roy Strasburger, 1952-1956
- Charles A. Wheeler Jr., 1956-1960
- Henry Taylor Jr., 1960-1964, 1968-1970
- Wilford Pitts, 1964-1965
- Truett Tomlinson, 1965-1968
- Jamie Hager Clements, 1970-1974
- David M. Bandy, 1974-1976
- William R. "Bill" Courtney, 1976-1980
- John F. Sammons Jr., 1980-1988
- W. A. "Buck" Prewitt III, 1988-1990
- Dennis D. Hobbs, 1990-1992
- J. W. Perry, 1992-1998
- Keifer Marshall Jr., 1998-2002
- William A. Jones III, 2002-2013
- Daniel A. Dunn, 2013-2018
- Timothy A. Davis, 2018-present

== See also ==
- Temple history
