= List of mayors of Harrisonburg, Virginia =

Mayors of the city of Harrisonburg, Virginia, USA

The following is a list of mayors of the city of Harrisonburg, Virginia, USA.

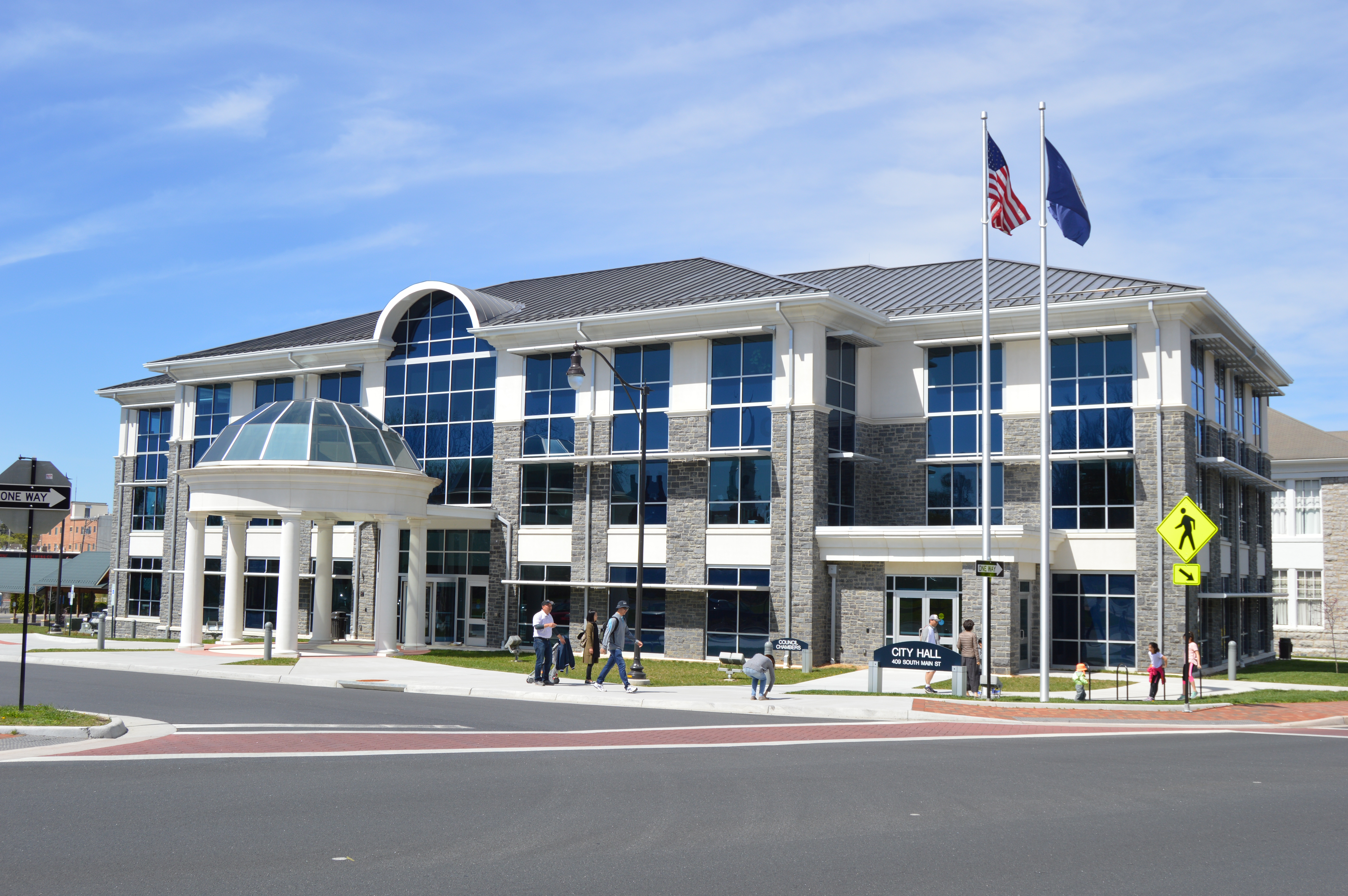
Harrisonburg City Hall building in Virginia, US, in 2017

- Isaac Hardesty, 1849-1850
- William G. Stevens, 1851-1852
- Henry T. Wartman, 1852-1853
- Wm. K. Wartman, 1853-1854
- Lyn Maupin, 1854-1855
- O.C. Sterling, 1855-1857
- B.F. Martz, 1857-1858
- Thomas L. Yancey, 1858-1860
- H.T. Wartman, 1860-1861
- Samuel Dold, 1861-1862
- S.M. Dold, 1862-1863
- George S. Christie, 1863-1864
- Sam Shecklett, 1864-1865
- Jacob L. Sibert, 1865-1869
- J.M. Ervins, 1869
- Joseph Hyde, 1875-1878
- J. Harnsberger, 1879
- H. Strayer, 1880
- Bryan Pendleton, 1881-1885
- D. Lewis, 1886-1887
- Frank Woodson, 1888-1889
- D. M. Switzer, 1890–1896, 1898-1900
- O. B. Roller, 1896-1912
- Jno. P. Burke, 1911
- John Downing, 1912-1918
- John Morrison, 1920–1924, 1936-1938
- Sheffey L. Devier, 1924-1928
- John Morrison, 1928-1932
- Ward Swank, 1932–1936, 1938-1944
- Bernard Denton, 1946-1948
- Lawrance Loewner, 1948-1954
- Walter Green, 1954-1956
- Frank Switzer, 1956-1968
- Roy Erickson, 1968-1983
- Walter Green, III, 1983-1992
- C. Robert Heath, 1992-1994
- John N. Neff, 1994-1996
- Rodney Eagle, 1996–2000, 2006-2008
- Carolyn W. Frank, 2000-2002
- Joseph G. Fitzgerald, 2002-2004
- Larry M. Rogers, 2004-2006, first African-American mayor
- Kai Degner, 2009-2010
- Richard A. Baugh, 2011-2012
- Ted Byrd, 2013-2014
- Chris Jones, 2015-2016
- Deanna R. Reed, 2017–present, first woman African-American mayor

== See also ==
- Harrisonburg history
