= List of mayors of Grand Prairie, Texas =

The following is a list of mayors of the city of Grand Prairie, Texas, United States.

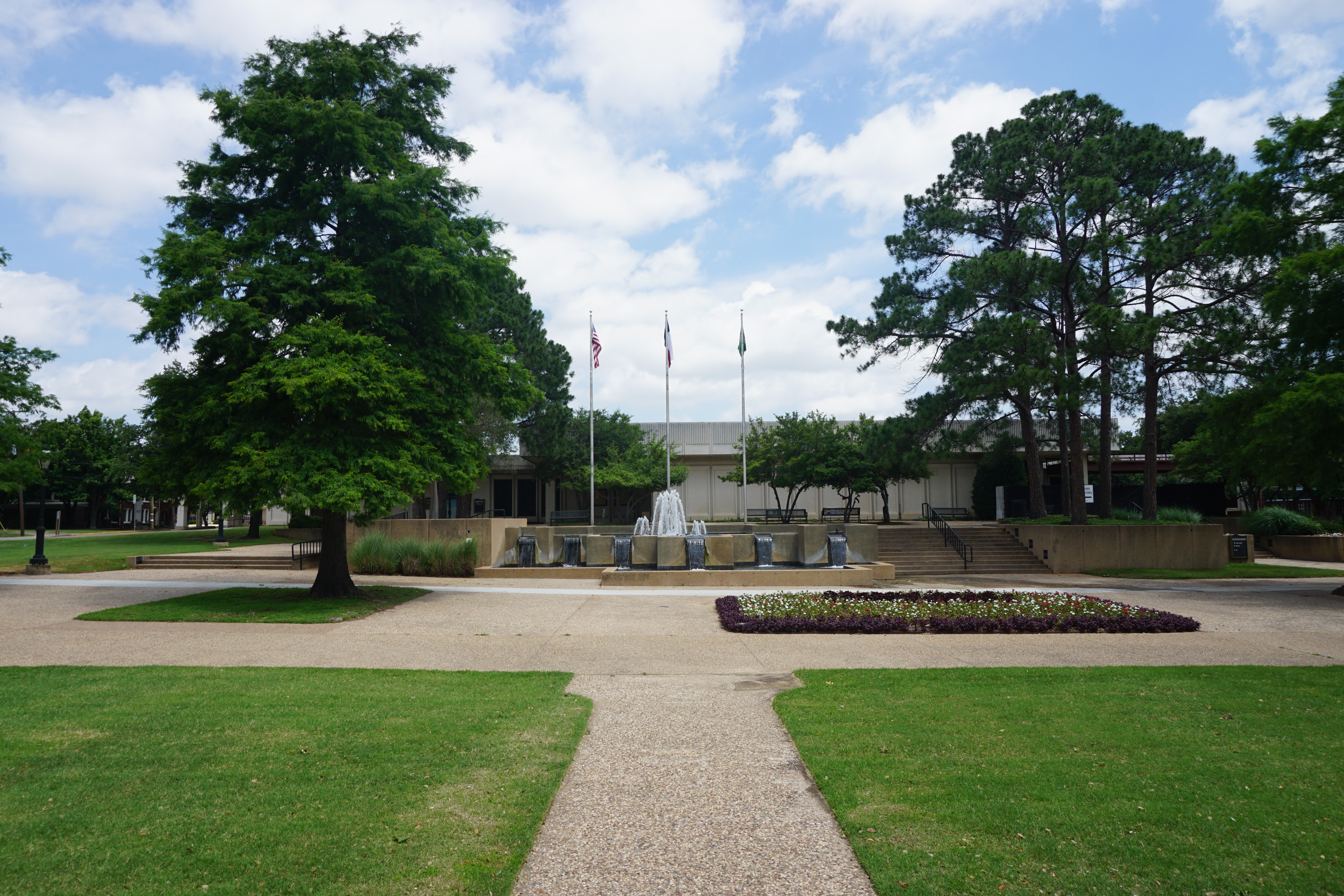
City hall building in Grand Prairie, Texas (photo 2019)

- S. R. Lively, c.1902
- R. E. Means, 1909-1910, 1911-1913
- P.A. Geeo, 1910-1911
- E. E. Hall, 1914-1916
- J. T. Owens, 1917-1918
- L. O. Turner, 1918-1920
- T. G. Collins, 1920-1922
- T. W. Wright, 1922-1923
- G. H. Turner, 1923-1935, 1937-1949
- George N. Doyal, 1935-1937
- E. Carlyle Smith, 1949-1953
- John W. Daugherty, 1953-1955
- C. R. Sargent, 1955-1959
- Eugene Goree, 1961-1962
- C. P. Waggoner, 1962-1970
- Joe Colwell, 1970-1972
- William F. Bowles, 1972-1976
- Weldon Parkhill, 1976-1980
- James Weems, 1980-1982
- Anne S. Gresham, 1982-1984
- Jerry Debo, 1984-1990
- Duane McGuffey, 1990-1992
- Charles England, 1992-2013
- Ron Jensen, 2013-present

== See also ==
- Grand Prairie history
