= List of mayors of Dothan, Alabama =

The following is a list of mayors of the city of Dothan, Alabama, United States.

- Arthur C. Crawford, 1888-1889, 1892-1893
- Henry Allen Pearce, 1895, 1900-1901
- J.L. Acree, c.1903
- Joseph Baker, c.1915-1916
- J.R. Young, c.1917
- W.E. Cannady, c.1924
- Clyde Lamar Coe, 1945-1947
- J. H. Brennan, c.1952
- J. B. Davis, c.1953
- J. T. Thrower, c.1954
- Richmond McClintock, 1954-1958
- Rufus Davis, c.1959
- Earle C. Moody, c.1960
- James W. "Jimmy" Grant III, 1973-1981
- Kenneth Everett, 1981-1985
- Larry Register, 1985-1989
- Alfred Saliba, 1989-1997
- Chester L. Sowell III, c.1999-2004
- Pat Thomas, c.2005-2008
- Mike Schmitz, 2009-2017
- Mark Saliba, 2017-present

== See also ==
- Dothan history
