= List of mayors of Lebanon, Tennessee =

City of Lebanon, Tennessee mayors

The following is a list of mayors of the city of Lebanon, Tennessee, United States of America.

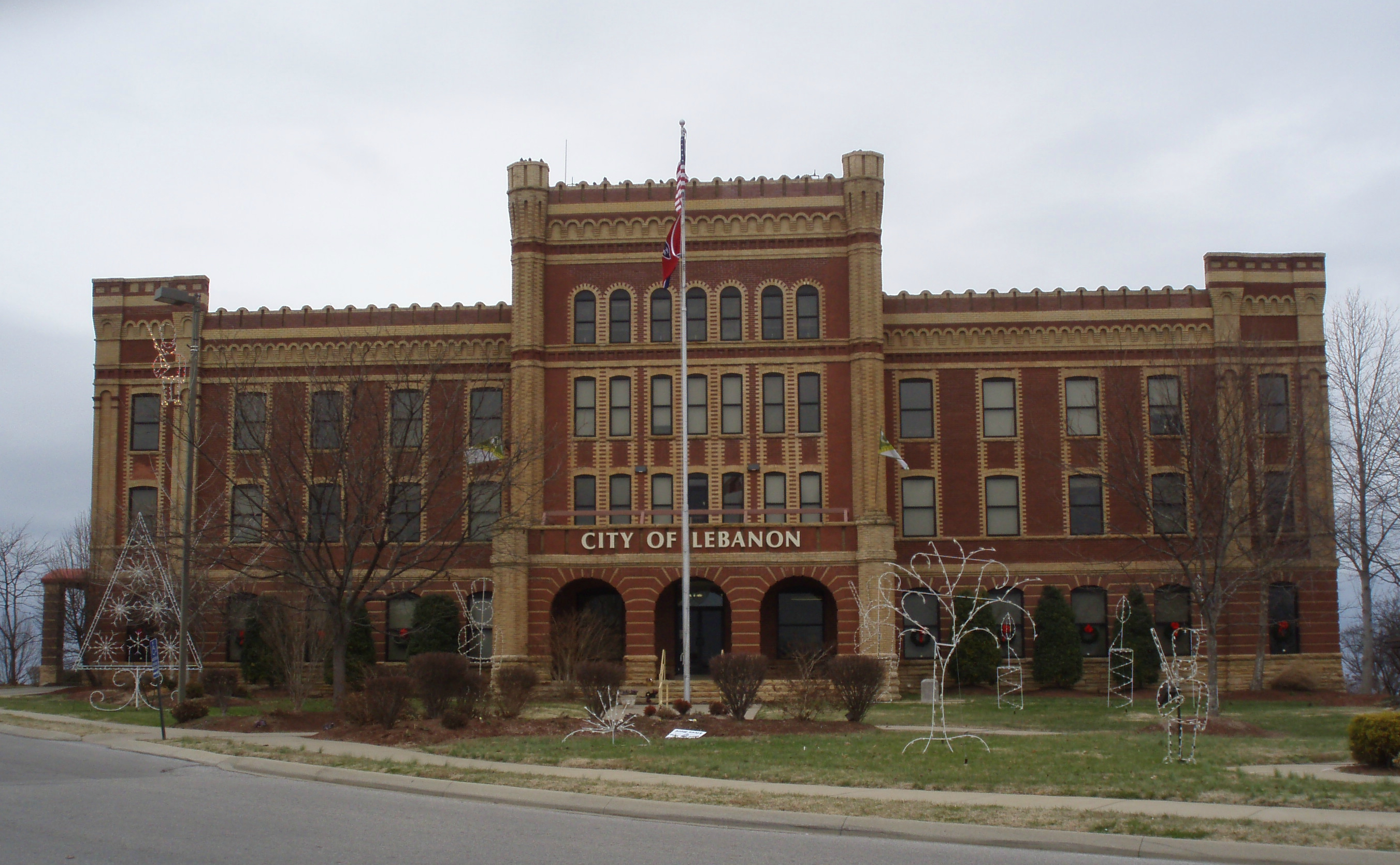
City hall building, Lebanon, Tennessee, 2008

- Edmund Crutcher, 1820-1822
- David Marshall, 1823
- Joseph Johnson, 1824–1825, 1836
- John S. Topp, 1826
- Harry L. Douglass, 1827
- Isaac Golladay, 1828
- John Muirhead, 1829-1830
- George H. Bullard, 1831, 1835
- E. A. White, 1832
- Michael Yerger, 1833
- John Hearn, 1834, 1839
- E. G. Cain, 1837
- George F. McWhirter, 1838, 1840–1841, 1842
- A. W. Vick, 1842
- Thomson Anderson, 1842
- Josiah S. McClain, 1843, 1857
- Lawrence Sypert, 1865
- R. E. Thompson, 1866, 1868–1869, 1876
- J. Matt Woolard, 1871, 1882-1886
- Sam G. Stratton, 1873
- E. E. Beard, 1878–1880, 1912
- A. B. Fonville, 1880-1882
- Sam Golladay, 1886-1890
- J. Neal MacKenzie, 1890-1893
- B. W. Cox, 1893-1898
- J. W. Huddleston, 1898-1900
- H. L. Coe, 1900–1902, 1907-1908
- Alex M. McClain, 1902-1907
- B. J. Dillard, 1908-1910
- J. T. Odum, 1910-1912
- Alex McGlothlin, 1912
- Andrew B. Martin, 1912-1919
- F. C. Stratton, 1919–1921, 1924-1925
- Will A. Hale, 1921
- O. B. Cleveland, 1921-1923
- T. E. Ellis, 1923-1924
- A. A. Adams Sr., 1925-1930
- Frank Buchanan, 1930-1948
- William D. Baird, c.1948-1960
- Charles D. Loyd, c.1962-1968
- Willis H. Maddox, c.1970, 1980-1986
- Jack Lowery, c.1975-1976
- Bobby Jewell, c.1990-1993
- Don W. Fox, c.1995-2008
- Philip Craighead, c.2010-2015
- Bernie Ash, c.2018-2020
- Rick Bell, c.2021-2024

== See also ==
- Lebanon history
