= List of mayors of Ketchikan, Alaska =

The following is a list of mayors of the city of Ketchikan, Alaska, United States.

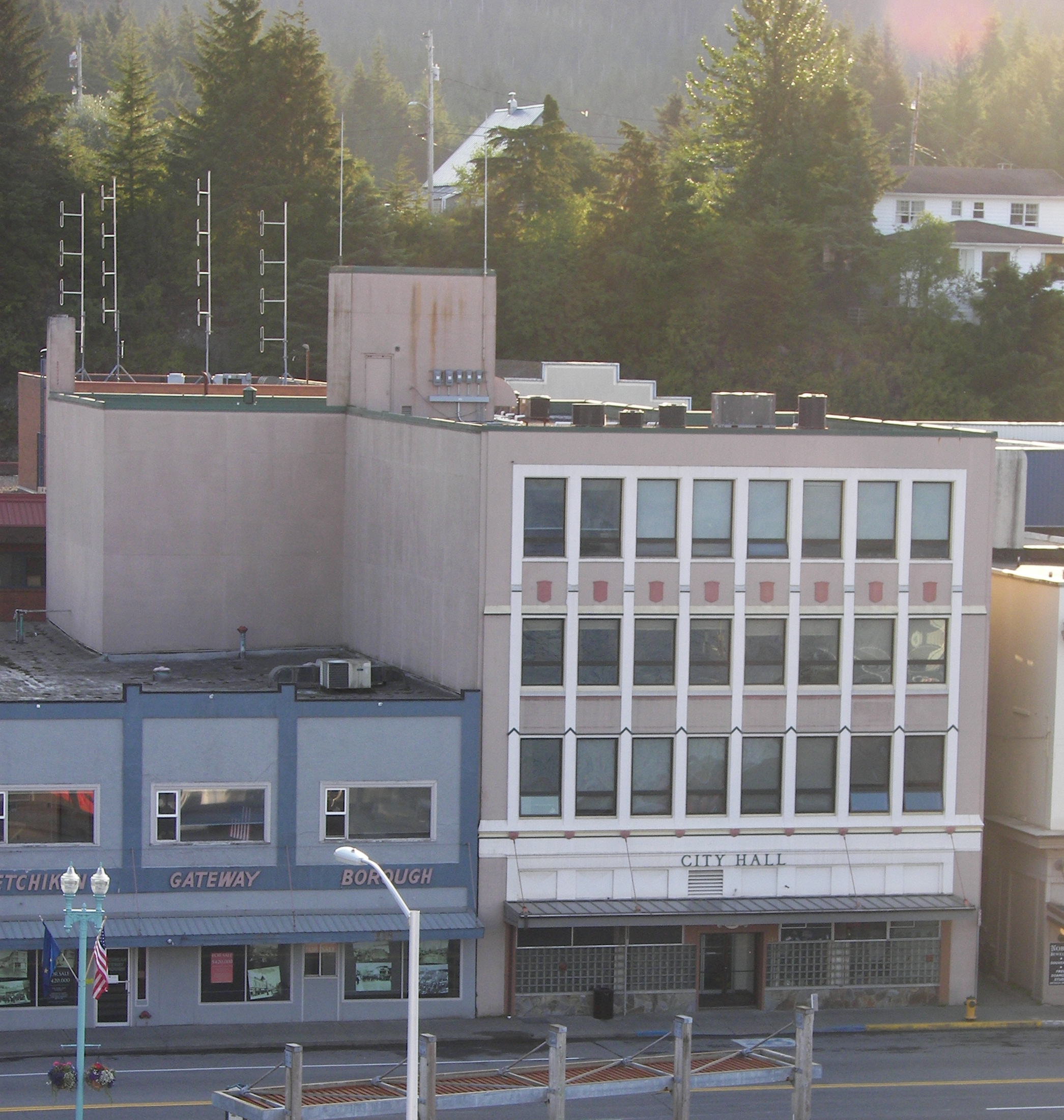
City hall building in Ketchikan, Alaska (photo 2009)

- M.E. Martin, 1900, 1903-1904
- A.P. Swineford, 1901
- George Irving, 1902, 1905
- Forest Hunt, 1906-1907
- J.E. Pittinger, 1908-1910
- Thomas Torry, 1911, 1921-1926
- Michael Joseph Heneghan, 1912-1913, 1916-1917, 1928
- F.E. Ryus, 1914
- John R. Beegle, 1915
- Arthur. A. Wakefield, 1918
- Robert L. Petty, 1919
- Dale W. Hunt, 1920
- Frank W. Thompson, 1927
- M.J. Bucey, 1929
- Norman R. Walker, 1930-1931
- F.R. Mitsch, 1932
- P.J. Gilmore, 1933-1935
- J.A. Talbot, 1936-1937, 1943, 1949-1950
- A.H. Ziegler, 1938
- Harry G. McCain, 1939-1940, 1942
- W.K. Spaulding, 1941
- R.C. Pedersen, 1944-1945
- J.E. Johnson, 1946
- Robert E. Ellis, 1947-1948
- George H. Beck, 1951-1954
- Joe H. Goding, 1955-1957
- J. E. Winston, 1958
- Richard M. Hardcastle, 1959-1960
- Louis J. Glatz, 1961-1963
- James Pinkerton, 1964-1966
- Oral Freeman, 1967-1969
- William F. Hamilton, 1970-1972
- William G. Moran, 1973-1978
- John W. Shay Jr., 1979-1983
- Charles E. Freeman, 1984
- Ted Ferry, 1985-1990
- Alaire E. Stanton, 1991-1996
- Bob Weinstein, 1997-2008
- Lew Williams III, 2009-2017
- Robert Sivertsen, 2018-2020, 2024-present
- Dave Kiffer, 2021-2023

== See also ==
- Ketchikan history
