= List of mayors of Conroe, Texas =

The following is a list of mayors of the city of Conroe, Texas, United States.

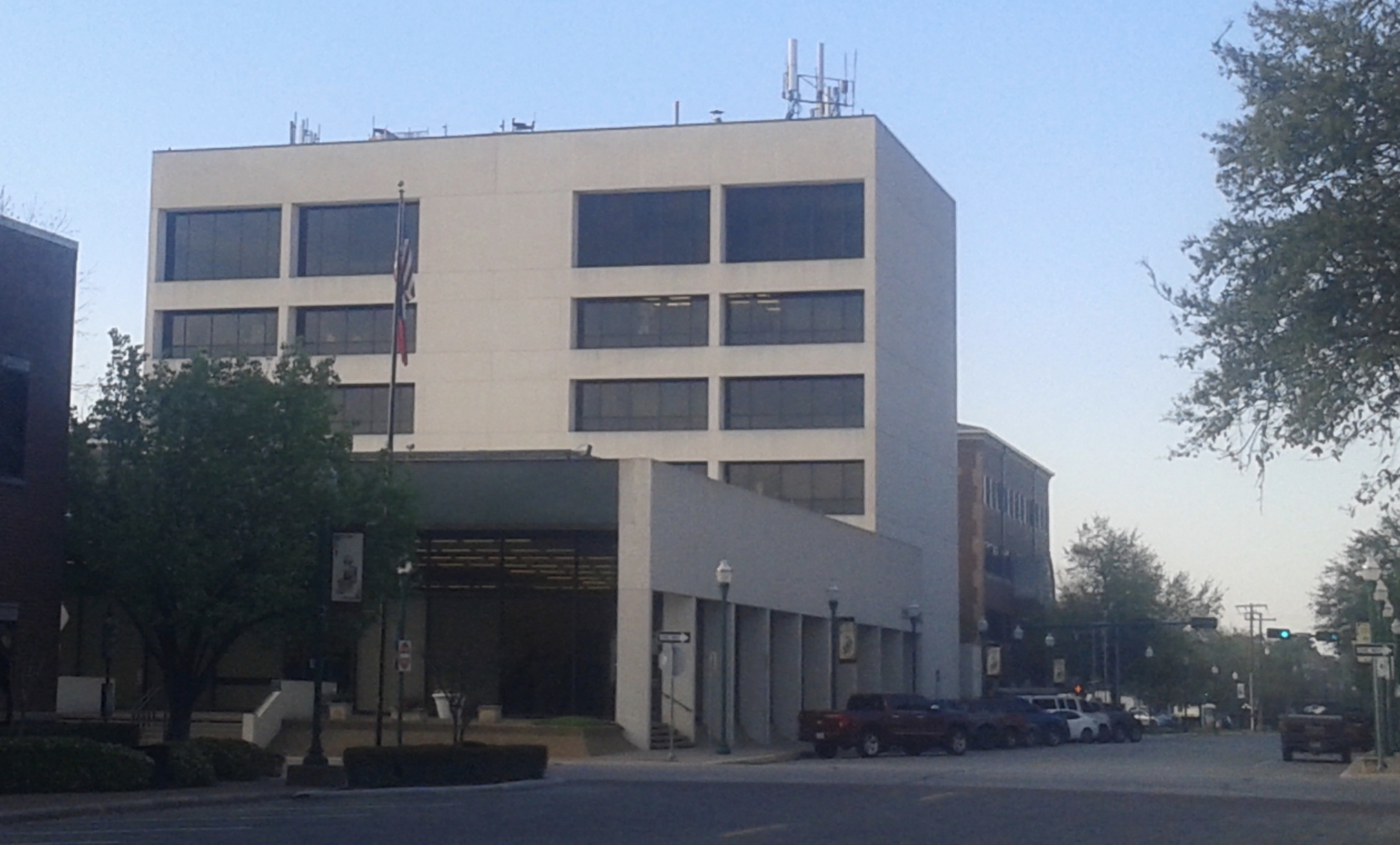
City hall building in Conroe, Texas (photo 2018)

- Columbus T. Darby, c.1908-1910
- Harry M. Crighton, c.1934
- Thomas Earle Gentry, c.1938-1942, 1948
- Mike C. Harris, c.1952
- W. F. "Bill" Newton, c.1953-1955
- M.W. “Buddy” Everett, 1961-1965
- R. A. "Mickey" Deison Jr., 1971-1974
- Scarlett Curry, 1989-1991
- Carter Moore, 1991-2004
- Tommy Metcalf, c.2004-2008
- Webb K. Melder, c.2008-2012
- Toby Powell, c.2018-2020
- Jody Czajkoski, c.2021-2024
- Duke W. Coon, 2024-present

== See also ==
- Conroe history
