= List of mayors of Franklin, Tennessee =

City of Franklin, Tennessee mayors

The following is a list of mayors of the city of Franklin, Tennessee, United States of America.

- Turner Saunders, 1815-1816, 1817-1818, 1819
- Charles H. McAlister, 1816-1817
- William G. Dickinson, 1818-1819
- William Eastin, 1819-1820
- Edward Breathitt, 1820-1823, 1825-1827
- William E. Owen, 1823-1827
- James Park, 1827-1828
- Nicholas Perkins, c.1828
- B.S. Tappan, 1829-1830
- Samuel Smith House
- Daniel Bonaparte Cliffe
- Cabell Rives Berry
- E.B. Campbell, c.1890
- Park Marshall, 1918-1922, 1925-1939
- Wallace Joseph Smith, early 1920s
- Frank Beasley, c.1949
- Frank Gray Jr., c.1952-1961
- Asa Jewell, c.1965-1966
- Ed Woodard, c.1970-1975
- Jeff Bethurum, 1977-1987
- Lillian Stewart, 1987-1989
- Jerry Sharber, 1989-2003
- Tom Miller, 2003-2007
- John Schroer, 2007-2011
- Ken Moore, c.2022-2024

== See also ==
- Franklin history
