= List of mayors of Owensboro, Kentucky =

The following is a list of mayors of the city of Owensboro, Kentucky, United States.

- Edward S. Ayres, 1866
- Samuel Dyson Kennady, 1866–1872
- Ben Bransford, c.1872–1874
- George Brown, c.1874–1878
- John Thixton, 1878–1880
- James K. Tharpe, c.1880–1883
- Joseph Lee, 1884–1890
- James H. Hickman, 1890–1897, 1913–1918, 1922–1926
- Warden Pope Small, 1897–1901
- Martin Yewell, 1901–1905
- William Meigs O'Bryan, 1905–1909
- Stinson Lambert, 1909–1913
- John Caldwell Calhoon, 1918–1922
- James Robert "J. R." Beck, 1926–1930
- Logan Meredith, 1930–1934
- Fred Lawrence Weir, 1934–1938, 1942–1946, 1950–1952
- Harry Charles Smith, 1938–1942
- Glenn Adams Lovern, 1946–1950
- Fred L. Weir, c.1951–1952
- LeRoy Woodward, 1952–1954
- Casper "Cap" Steinmetz Gardner, 1954–1958
- Benjamin Walker Hawes, 1958–1964
- Dugan Best, 1964–1967
- Irvin Terrill, 1967–1972
- Cloran Waitman Taylor Jr., 1972–1976
- John Calhoun "Jack" Fisher, 1976–1980, 1984–1988
- James Rufus "J. R." Miller, 1980–1984
- David Cyrus Adkisson, 1988–1995
- Waymond Morris, 1995–2004
- Tom Watson, 2005–2008, 2017–present
- Ron Payne, 2011–2016

== See also ==
- Owensboro history
