= List of mayors of Middletown, New York =

The following is a list of mayors of the city of Middletown in Orange County, New York state, United States.

- John E. Iseman, 1888-1889
- Samuel M. Boyd, 1890-1891
- Daniel H. Bailey, 1892-1893
- W.K. Stansbury, 1894-1896
- Dwight W. Berry, 1897
- Charles E. Mance, 1897-1898, 1901-1902
- Charles L. Elwood, 1899-1900
- George W. O'Neal, 1903
- Kester W. Staib, 1903
- A.J. Hornbeck, 1904-1906
- Robert Lawrence, 1907-1910, 1922-1923
- Rosslyn M. Cox, 1911-1915, 1918-1921
- A.C.N. Thompson, 1916-1917
- Abram B. Macardell, 1924-1929
- Clarence C. VanFleet, 1930-1933
- E.P. Valkenburgh, 1933
- Harry Terhune, 1934-1935
- Joseph D. Mellis, 1935
- Charles C. Chappell, 1936-1937
- Robert P. Anderson, 1938-1941
- Harold H. Smith, 1942-1943
- Edward T. Brochu, 1944-1945
- Samuel Mitchell, 1946-1951
- Louis V. Mills, 1952-1955
- Raymond E. Swalm, 1956-1961
- John N. Botens, 1962-1965
- Jerome Markovits, 1966-1971
- John McMickle, 1972-1973
- Myron R. Perry, 1974-1981
- Richard A. Hutchings, 1981-1985
- Daniel F. Johnson, 1986-1989
- Gertrude F. Mokotoff, 1990-1993
- Joseph M. DeStefano, 1994-2005, 2010-present
- Marlinda Duncanson, 2005-2009

== See also ==
- History of Middletown, New York
