= List of mayors of Keene, New Hampshire =

Mayors of the city of Keene, New Hampshire, USA

The following is a list of mayors of the city of Keene, New Hampshire, United States.

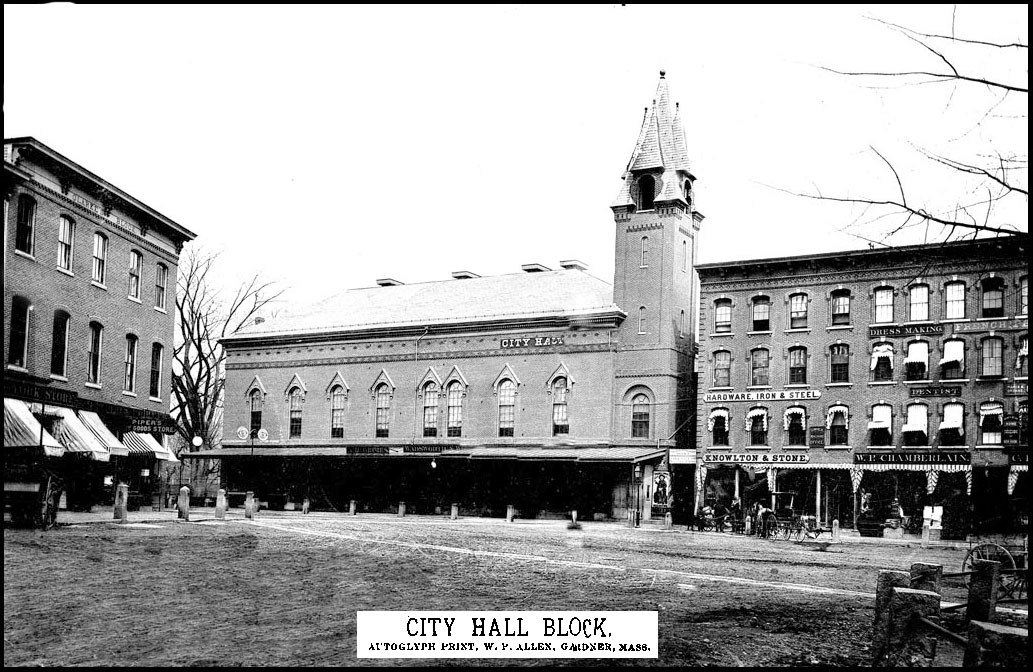
Keene City Hall, circa 1870s–1880s

- Horatio Colony, 1874–1875
- Edward Farrar, 1876–1877
- Reuben Stewart, 1878–1879
- Horatio Kimball, 1880, 1883–1884, 1891
- Ira W. Russell, 1881–1882
- Alfred T. Batchelder, 1885–1886
- Asa Smith, 1887–1888
- Herbert B. Viall, 1889–1890
- Frederic A. Faulkner, 1892–1894
- George W. McDuffee, 1895–1896
- Francis A. Perry, 1897, 1901–1902
- George H. Eames, 1898–1899
- Austin A. Ellis, 1900
- James S. Taft, 1903–1905
- Martin V. B. Clark, 1906–1909
- John E. Benton, 1910
- Charles G. Shedd, 1911–1913
- Herbert E. Fay, 1914–1915
- Orville E. Cain, 1916, 1921–1922
- George H. Eames Jr., 1917–1918
- William H. Watson, 1919–1920
- Robert T. Kingsbury, 1923–1925
- Arthur R. Jones, 1926–1928
- Forrest L. Carey, 1929–1930
- John J. Landers, 1931
- Nathan C. Sibley, 1932–1933
- George F. T. Trask, 1934–1937
- William J. Callahan, 1938
- Richard L. Holbrook, 1938–1945
- James C. Farmer, 1946–1947
- Frederick D. Mitchell, 1948–1949
- Leroy S. Ford, 1950–1951
- Laurence M. Pickett, 1952–1955
- J. Alfred Dennis, 1956–1957
- Richard P. Gilbo, 1958–1960
- Charles A. Coolidge, 1960–1961
- Robert L. Mallat Jr., 1962–1965
- Richard E. Bean, 1966–1969
- Robert H. Clark Jr., 1970–1971
- James A. Masiello, 1972–1975
- George M. Rossiter, 1976–1977
- Richard P. Peloquin, 1978–1981
- L. Edward Reyor, 1982–1987
- Aaron A. Lipsky, 1988–1993
- William F. Lynch, 1994–1995
- Patricia T. Russell, 1996–1999
- Michael E.J. Blastos, 2000–2007
- Philip Dale Pregent, 2008–2011
- Kendall W. Lane, 2012–2019
- George Hansel, 2020–2023
- Jay Kahn, 2024–present

== See also ==
- Keene history
