= Robert L. Mallat Jr. =

American politician

Mayor of Keene, New Hampshire
- In office 1962–1966
- Preceded by: Charles A. Coolidge
- Succeeded by: Richard E. Bean

Member of the New Hampshire House of Representatives from the Cheshire 13th district
- In office 1970–1972

Personal details
- Born: Robert Lester Mallat Jr. July 13, 1931 Keene, New Hampshire, U.S.
- Died: December 24, 2015 (aged 84) California, U.S.
- Party: Democratic
- Education: Keene State College

Robert Lester Mallat Jr. (July 13, 1931 – December 24, 2015) was an American politician. A member of the Democratic Party, he served as mayor of Keene, New Hampshire from 1962 to 1966 and in the New Hampshire House of Representatives from 1970 to 1972.

== Life and career ==
Mallat was born in Keene, New Hampshire, the son of Robert Mallat Sr. and Margaret Sweeney. He attended Keene High School, graduating in 1949. After graduating, he attended Keene State College, earning his Bachelor of Education degree in 1958.

Mallat served as mayor of Keene, New Hampshire from 1962 to 1966. After his service as mayor, he served in the New Hampshire House of Representatives from 1970 to 1972.

== Death ==
Mallat died on December 24, 2015 at his home in California, at the age of 84.
