= Lioneld Jordan =

American politician (born 1953)

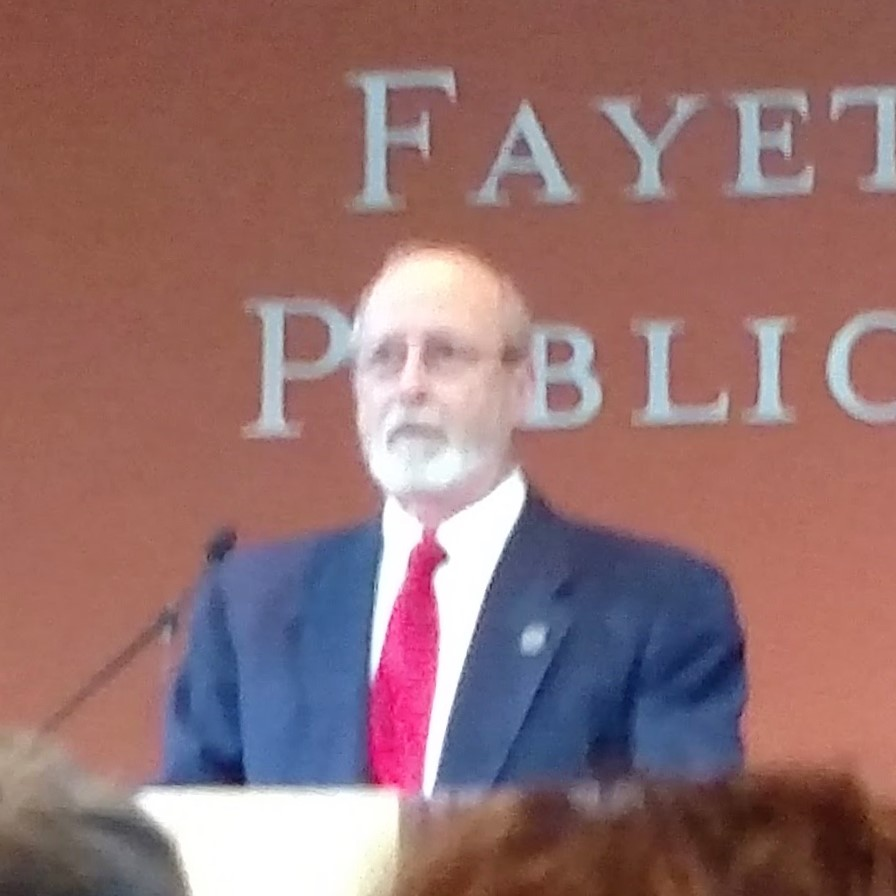
- Jordan in 2018

51st Mayor of Fayetteville, Arkansas
- In office January 1, 2009 – December 31, 2024
- Preceded by: Dan Coody
- Succeeded by: Molly Rawn

Personal details
- Born: October 13, 1953 (age 72) Fayetteville, Arkansas, U.S.
- Spouse: Diana (m. 1976)
- Children: 4
- Awards: Dr. Martin Luther King Jr. Brotherhood Award

Lioneld Jordan (born October 13, 1953) is an American politician who served as the 51st Mayor of Fayetteville, Arkansas, from January 1, 2009, to December 31, 2024. He defeated incumbent Dan Coody in 2008 and was unseated by Molly Rawn in 2024.

== Early life and education ==
Lioneld Jordan was born on October 13, 1953, in Fayetteville, Arkansas. He attended the University of Arkansas as an undergraduate student.

== Career ==
Jordan worked for the University of Arkansas Department of Facilities Management for 26 years as a carpenter and zone supervisor. During this time he became the president of the American Federation of State, County and Municipal Employees (AFSCME) Local 965 and later president of the Northwest Arkansas Labor Council. He was also a member of the University of Arkansas Staff Senate.

Jordan was elected to the Fayetteville City Council in 2000 to represent Ward 4 and was re-elected in 2004. During his second term he served as vice mayor. He unseated incumbent mayor Dan Coody in 2008 and took office on January 1, 2009. He was re-elected in 2012, 2016 and 2020.

As mayor, Jordan prioritized climate action, environmental initiatives and public infrastructure projects. In 2018, Fayetteville became the first city in Arkansas to adopt a 100% clean energy goal. The city was included on the CDP Cities A-List and received the U.S. Conference of Mayors Climate Protection Award in 2019. In 2019, Fayetteville voters approved a $226 million bond package, which funded street improvements, park projects and development of the Cultural Arts Corridor, later named The Ramble.

Jordan sought a fifth term in 2024. He faced three challengers, among them Molly Rawn. Jordan received 16,609 votes to Rawn's 13,068 and the two other candidates' 5,718 and advanced to a December 3 runoff. Rawn unseated Jordan by 262 votes (2.47%). In January 2025, he received the Dr. Martin Luther King Jr. Brotherhood Award.

== Personal life ==
Jordan married his wife, Diana, in 1976. They have four children. Diana was born in Pomona, California, and moved to Springdale, Arkansas when she was 10 years old.

== Awards and honors ==
The Lioneld Jordan Fellowship in Labor and Working Class Studies, named in his honor, is granted by the University of Arkansas. In January 2025, he received the Dr. Martin Luther King Jr. Brotherhood Award and in August he and his wife were inducted into the Fayetteville Public Schools hall of honor.
