= List of mayors of Fayetteville, Arkansas =

Mayor of Fayetteville, Arkansas
- Incumbent; Molly Rawn since January 1, 2025
- Term length: 4 years
- First holder: P. Vinson Rhea

The mayor of Fayetteville, Arkansas is an elected city leader. Fayetteville is the second largest city in Arkansas and has a population of around 94,000.

In 1868, during the American Civil War, Mayor M. LaRue Harrison was forcibly removed from office. For the remainder of the war, Fayetteville was under military control and did not have a mayor.

In 1992, the city's government transitioned from a city board to a mayor–council structure.

== Pre-Civil War (1841–1868) ==
No.	Name	Term	Refs.
1	P. Vinson Rhea	1841	
2	J. W. Walker	1859	
3	Stephen Bedford	1860	
4	M. LaRue Harrison	1868	

== City board (1868–1992) ==
No.	Name	Term	Refs.
5	E. I. Stirman	1869	
6	T. Murray Campbell	1871	
7	J. R. Pettigrew	1872	
8	George A. Grace	1873	
9	Robert J. Wilson	1874	
10	A. M. Wilson	1876	
11	A. S. Vandeventer	1877	
12	J. H. Van Hoose	1880	
13	W. C. Jackson	1881	
14	C. W. Walker	1883	
15	W. C. Jackson	1885	
16	R. J. Wilson		
17	O. C. Gray	1886	
18	E. B. Wall	1887	
19	J. H. Van Hoose	1888	
20	F. M. Goar	1889	
21	W. S. Pollard	1891–1895	
22	Jack Walker	1897	
23	J. T. Eason	1901	
24	C. A. Mullholland	1905	
25	W. H. Rollins	1909–1913	
26	Guy Phillips	1913–1914	
27	Tom Taylor	1914–1917	
28	Allan Wilson	1921–1929	
29	T. S. Tribble	1929–1935	
30	A. D. McAllister	1935–1941	
31	George Vaughn	1941–1944	
32	G. T. Sanders	1944–1949	
33	Powell M. Rhea	1949–1953	
34	Roy A. Scott	1954–1957	
35	J. Austin Parrish	1958–1959	
36	Guy E. Brown	1960–1965	
37	Don Trumbo	1966–1968	
38	Garland Melton Jr.	1969–1970	
39	Joe Fred Starr	1971–1972	
40	Russell Purdy	1973–1974	
41	Marion Orton	1975–1976	
42	Ernest Lancaster	1977–1978	
43	David Malone	1978–1979	
44	John Todd	1980–1981	
45	Paul Robert Noland	1982–1986	
46	Marilyn Johnson	1986–1987	
47	William V. Martin	1987–1990	
48	Fred S. Vorsanger	1991–1992	

== Mayor–council (1992–present) ==
No.	Name	Term	Party affiliation	Refs.
49	Fred Hanna	1992–2000		
50	Dan Coody	January 1, 2000 – December 31, 2008		
51	Lioneld Jordan	January 1, 2009 – December 31, 2024		
52	Molly Rawn	January 1, 2025 – present	Democrat	

== See also ==
- List of mayors of places in Arkansas
