= Molly Rawn =

American business executive and politician (born 1982)

52nd Mayor of Fayetteville, Arkansas
- Incumbent
- Assumed office January 1, 2025
- Preceded by: Lioneld Jordan

Personal details
- Born: Molly Collier; January 17, 1982 (age 44) Paragould, Arkansas, U.S.
- Party: Democratic
- Spouse: Jeremy Rawn
- Children: 3
- Education: University of Arkansas (BA)
- Website: Campaign website

Molly Rawn (née Collier; born January 17, 1982) is an American business executive and politician who has been serving as the 52nd Mayor of Fayetteville, Arkansas, since January 1, 2025.

== Early life and education ==
Molly Collier was born on January 17, 1982, in Paragould, Arkansas. As a child, Rawn said she "didn't always fit in," and "would stay inside during recess to read." She attended Pulaski Academy before moving to Fayetteville in 2005 to attend the University of Arkansas, where she received a Bachelor of Arts degree in 2008.

== Career ==
Early in her career, Rawn was the director of development of the Northwest Arkansas Women's Shelter. Later, she became the assistant director of development at the J. William Fulbright College of Arts and Sciences and the KUAF membership director. She then served as the director of development and communications at the Scott Family Amazeum in Bentonville. In 2015, she was named in the Northwest Arkansas Business Journal's Forty Under 40 list. In 2016, Rawn was appointed executive director of the Fayetteville Advertising and Promotion Commission and served as the CEO of its tourism marketing organization, Experience Fayetteville, until her election as mayor.

Rawn, a Democrat, challenged incumbent Lioneld Jordan in the 2024 Fayetteville mayoral election, a nonpartisan election. She stated a focus on housing, climate resilience and economic development. In the general election, Jordan received 16,609 votes to Rawn's 13,068, while two other candidates received a total of 5,718 votes. A runoff election between Jordan and Rawn was held on December 3, in which Rawn won with 51.14% of the vote to Jordan's 48.86%.

Rawn is scheduled to emcee the 2025 Northwest Arkansas Gridiron Show, a political comedy fundraiser for scholarships awarded by the Society of Professional Journalists.

== Personal life ==
Rawn describes herself as an "avid reader". She is married to Jeremy Rawn. She has three children: Collier, Miller and Opal.

Rawn is an Episcopalian.

== Electoral history ==
=== 2024 ===
2024 Fayetteville mayoral election
Party	Candidate	Votes	%
Nonpartisan	Lioneld Jordan (incumbent)	16,609	46.92%
Nonpartisan	Molly Rawn	13,068	36.92%
Nonpartisan	Tom Terminella	4,386	12.39%
Nonpartisan	Adam Fire Cat	1,332	3.76%

2024 Fayetteville mayoral election runoff
Party	Candidate	Votes	%
Nonpartisan	Molly Rawn	5,411	51.24%
Nonpartisan	Lioneld Jordan (incumbent)	5,149	48.76%
