= George McGill (Arkansas politician) =

American politician

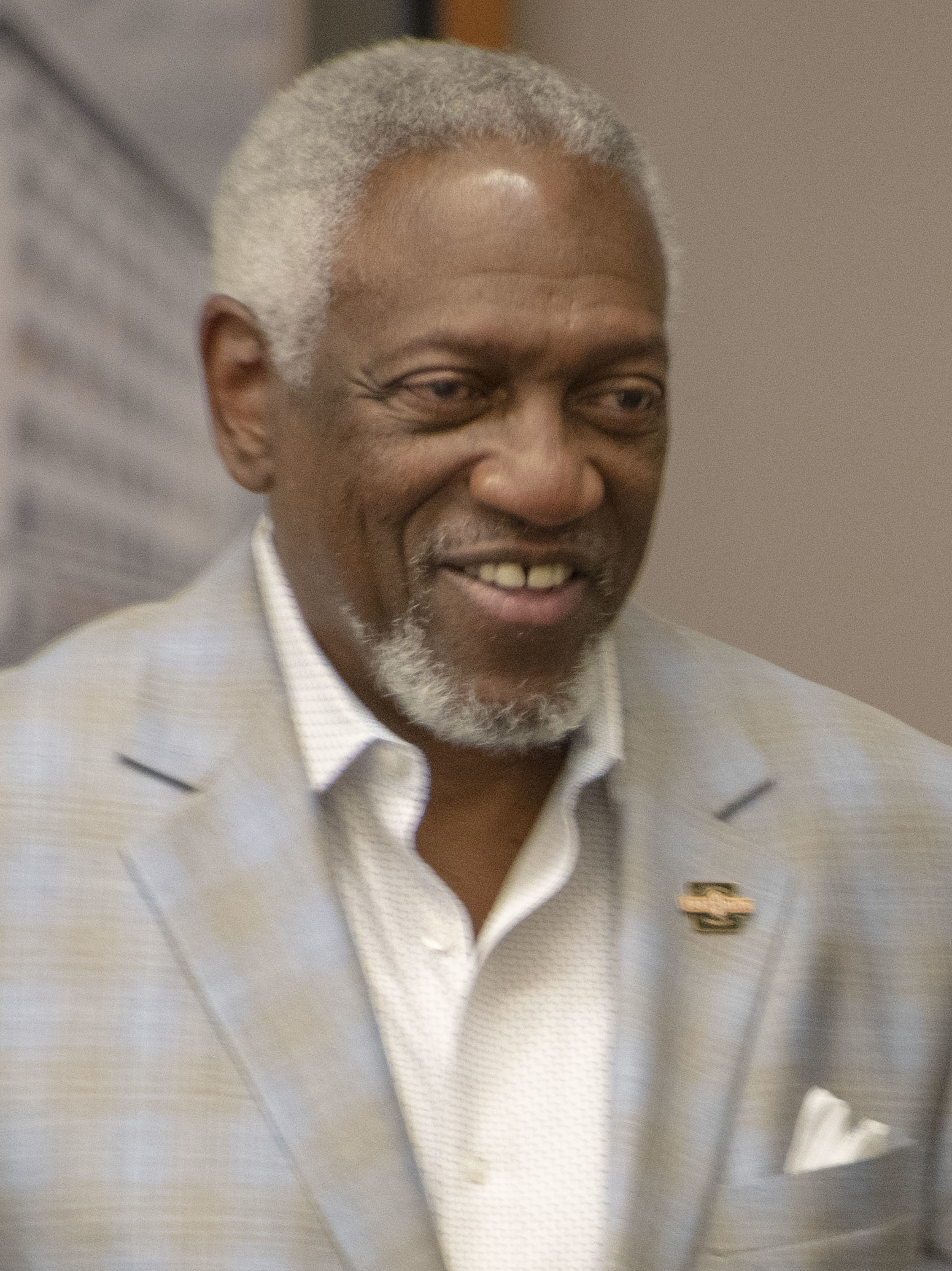

Mayor of Fort Smith
- Incumbent
- Assumed office January 1, 2019
- Preceded by: Sandy Sanders

Member of the Arkansas House of Representatives from the 78th district
- In office January 14, 2013 – January 1, 2019
- Preceded by: Billy Gaskill
- Succeeded by: Jay Richardson

Personal details
- Born: August 22, 1946 (age 79) Fort Smith, Arkansas, U.S.
- Party: Democratic
- Education: University of Arkansas (MBA)

George B. McGill (born August 22, 1946) is an American Democratic politician who has been serving as the 49th Mayor of Fort Smith, Arkansas since January 1, 2019. Prior to his mayorlty, McGill was a member of the Arkansas House of Representatives representing District 78 since January 14, 2013. He served in this position until he was sworn in as mayor, and was replaced by Jay Richardson. He is the first Black person to serve as Fort Smith's mayor.

== Education ==
McGill earned his Master of Business Administration from the University of Arkansas.

== Elections ==
- 2012 When District 78 Representative Billy Gaskill left the Legislature and left the seat open, McGill was unopposed for both the May 22, 2012 Democratic Primary, and the November 6, 2012 General election. He would run unopposed in his 2014 and 2016 re-election bids as well.
- 2018 When McGill, who was still serving as a state representative, was elected mayor of Fort Smith after defeating two challengers. McGill received 4,417 votes, or 56.63 percent of the total vote. One of McGill's opponents, Wayne Haver, former principal of Southside High School, received 2,588 votes, or 33.18 percent, while his other opponent, Luis Andrade, a full-time student at the University of Arkansas at Fort Smith, earned 795 votes, or 10.19 percent.

== Mayor of Fort Smith ==
On August 14, 2018, McGill was elected mayor of Fort Smith, Arkansas after winning 56.64 percent of the total vote. On January 1, 2019, in front of a crowd of hundreds at the Judge Isaac C. Parker Federal Building, McGill was sworn in as the first African-American mayor in Fort Smith's history.

== See also ==
- Mayors of Fort Smith, Arkansas
- List of first African-American mayors
