= Mayoralty in the United States =

US system of local government

The structure of city governance in the United States determines the specific roles and powers of a mayor, leading to various types of mayoral positions. American mayors tend to be formally addressed as His or Her Honor while in office. It is uncommon for mayors of large cities to serve for extended periods, as many cities have term limits or arrange leadership changes with elections or alternative methods.

== Types of mayoralty ==
=== Council-manager ===
Under council–manager government, the mayor is a first among equals on the city council, analogous to a head of state for the city. They may chair the city council, lacking any special legislative powers, but in most cases can set the legislative agenda. The mayor and city council serve part-time, with day-to-day administration in the hands of a professional city manager. The system is most common among medium-sized cities from around 25,000 to several hundred thousand, usually rural and suburban municipalities.

=== Mayor-council ===
In the second form, known as mayor–council government, the mayoralty and city council are separate offices. Under a strong mayor system, the mayor acts as an elected executive, with the city council functioning with legislative powers. They may select a chief administrative officer to oversee the different departments. This is the system used in most of the United States' large cities, primarily because mayors serve full-time and have a wide range of services that they oversee. In a weak mayor or ceremonial mayor system, the mayor has appointing power for department heads but is subject to checks by the city council, sharing both executive and legislative duties with the council. This is common for smaller cities, especially in New England (where most towns do not even have mayors at all). Charlotte, North Carolina, and Minneapolis, Minnesota, are two notable large cities with a ceremonial mayor.

== History ==
=== New York City ===
Four mayors of New York City have served three terms (12 years): Fiorello H. La Guardia (1934–1945), Robert F. Wagner Jr. (1954–1965), Ed Koch (1978–1989), and Michael Bloomberg (2002–2013).

Fiorello H. La Guardia served as mayor during the Great Depression and World War II. A Republican, he ran on a "fusion " ticket to oppose the Tammany Hall Democratic machine, supported by a coalition of Republicans, and various reform groups. His administration frequently collaborated with the Federal government under Franklin D. Roosevelt.

Robert F. Wagner Jr. Served from 1954 to 1965. During his 1961 re-election campaign, he broke with the leadership of Tammany Hall, an event often cited as the end of the organization's political dominance in the city politics.

Ed Koch served as mayor from 1978 to 1989, a total of 12 years.

Michael Bloomberg served from 2002 to 2013. His administration expanded public charter schools, implemented rezoning policies for commercial and residential development, and supported gun control and public health regulation. Bloomberg faced criticism for the NYPD's use of "stop-and-frisk" and surveillance against Muslim communities.

=== Los Angeles ===
Tom Bradley (1973–1993) is the longest-serving mayor in Los Angeles history, serving five terms. He was the city's first African-American mayor.

Antonio Villaraigosa (2005–2013) was the first Hispanic mayor of the city since 1872. His tenure was marked by initiatives in public transit expansion and gang prevention.

=== Chicago ===
Richard M. Daley (1989–2011) is the longest-serving mayor in Chicago history. His administration oversaw infrastructure project and a shift in the local economy toward the service sector. He was criticized for the city's increasing debt level.

Richard J. Daley (1955–1976), the father of Richard M., served for 21 years. He was chairman of the Cook County Democratic central committee and maintained an influential political organization that played a role in state and national politics.

=== Boston ===
Thomas Menino (1993–2014) is the longest-serving mayor in Boston's history, holding office for 21 years. His administration focused on neighborhood revitalization and public safety.

Kevin White (1968–1984) served for 16 years. He oversaw the redevelopment of the city's downtown area but faced criticism for his response to racial tensions during the city's desegregation busing crisis.

=== Detroit ===
Coleman Young (1974–1994) was the longest-serving mayor in Detroit history, serving five terms. He was the city's first African American mayor and prioritize racial integration of the city's police force and economic development projects.

== See also ==
- 2025 United States local elections
- List of mayors of the 50 largest cities in the United States
- List of longest-serving mayors in the United States
