= Cymat Technologies =

Canadian materials technology company

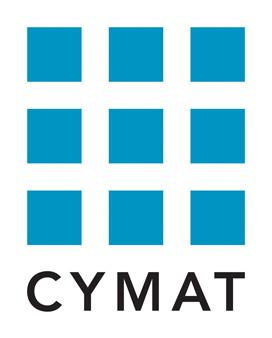
- Company type: Public Corporation
- Industry: Military; Architectural; Automotive
- Founded: 1995
- Headquarters: Mississauga, Ontario, Canada
- Key people: Michael M. Liik (CEO and Executive Chairman of the Board); Darryl Kleebaum (Chief Financial Officer)
- Products: Stabilized Aluminum foam (SAF)
- Website: www.cymat.com

Cymat Technologies is a materials technology company based out of Mississauga, Ontario, Canada, and involved in the production of stabilized aluminum foam.

== Business ==
Cymat Technologies has the worldwide rights, through patents and licenses, to manufacture Stabilized Aluminum Foam (SAF). Cymat is focused on producing SAF for architecture, blast mitigation and automotive industries. The company markets architectural SAF under the Alusion trademark and automotive and blast mitigation SAF under the SmartMetal trademark.

Cymat Technologies operates out of its manufacturing plant in Toronto, Canada. The plant can manufacture approximately $50 million in stabilized aluminum foam annually.

== Process ==
As described in the patent originally created by Alcan with parallel patents created by Norsk Hydro, "Stabilized Aluminum Foam" is generated in a continuous casting process via direct shop air injection into a Metal Matrix Composite (MMC) melt. The MMC comprises an Al-Si cast alloy with a volume of particle in suspension. The purpose of the particle is to provide melt stability and must adhere to the following criteria;

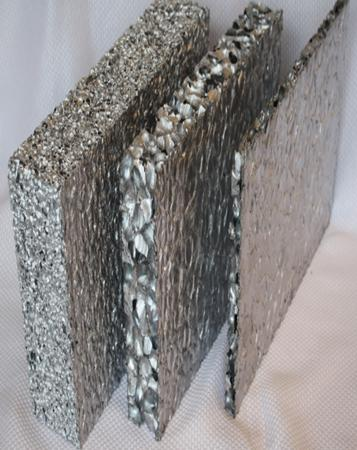
Stabilized Aluminum Foam cast by Cymat Technologies

- Consist of Alumina, Titanium diboride, Zirconia, Silicon Carbide, Silicon nitride or any solid stabilizer materials
- Must compose of less than 25 vol% of the MMC
- Particulate sizes must range from 0.5 μm to 25 μm, preferably in the range of 1 μm to 20 μm

Though it is a controversial topic, it is widely accepted that the presence of the solid particles aid in the "stabilization" of bubbles. It is thought that particulate aids in foam stability via the following mechanisms:

- Increase bulk liquid viscosity

- Slows the flow of molten metal through the cell walls to help maintain a stable structure.

- Creates a mechanical disjoining pressure

- A repulsive force which helps to maintain the cell wall thickness between two adjacent cells.

- Reduction in Drainage

- Presence of particulate in the foam helps to impede the flow of molten metal in the direction of gravity by obstructing the cell walls and sustaining the liquid.

The process for the creation of Stabilized Aluminum Foam and can be broken down into these 4 rudimentary steps:

1. Melting
2. Air Injection
3. Casting
4. Solidification

Once the raw MMC is melted, it is then transferred to the foaming apparatus where gas is injected into the melt and dispersed using either rotating impellers or vibrating nozzles. The bubbles rise to the surface and the resultant metal foam mixture cast will rise out of the foaming apparatus due to its density relative to that of the molten MMC. As the metallic foam is being cast, it is simultaneously drawn off the surface by, for example, a conveyor belt. While it is drawn off, it is then cooled and forms a porous metallic structure.

== See also ==
- Aluminium foam sandwich
- Composite materials
- Metal foam
- Metal matrix composite
