= Blowing agent =

Substance producing a foaming process in a variety of materials

A blowing agent is a substance which is capable of producing a cellular structure via a foaming process in a variety of materials that undergo hardening or phase transition, such as polymers, plastics, and metals. They are typically applied when the blown material is in a liquid stage. The cellular structure in a matrix reduces density, increasing thermal and acoustic insulation, while increasing relative stiffness of the original polymer.

Blowing agents (also known as 'pneumatogens') or related mechanisms to create holes in a matrix producing cellular materials, have been classified as follows:

- Physical blowing agents include CFCs (however, these are ozone depletants, banned by the Montreal Protocol of 1987), HCFCs (replaced CFCs, but are still ozone depletants, therefore being phased out), hydrocarbons (e.g. pentane, isopentane, cyclopentane), and liquid CO_{2}. The bubble/foam-making process is irreversible and endothermic, i.e. it needs heat (e.g. from a melt process or the chemical exotherm due to cross-linking), to volatilize a liquid blowing agent. However, on cooling process, the blowing agent will condense, which is a reversible process.
- Chemical blowing agents include isocyanate and water for polyurethane, azodicarbonamide for vinyl, hydrazine and other nitrogen-based materials for thermoplastic and elastomeric foams, and sodium bicarbonate for thermoplastic foams. Gaseous products and other byproducts are formed by a chemical reaction of the chemical blowing agent, promoted by the heat of the foam production process or a reacting polymer's exothermic heat. Since the blowing reaction occurs forming low molecular weight compounds acting as the blowing gas, additional exothermic heat is also released. Powdered titanium hydride is used as a foaming agent in the production of metal foams, as it decomposes to form hydrogen gas and titanium at elevated temperatures. Zirconium(II) hydride is used for the same purpose. Once formed the low molecular weight compounds will never revert to the original blowing agent; the reaction is irreversible.
- Mixed physical/chemical blowing agents are used to produce flexible PU foams with very low densities. Here both the chemical and physical blowing are used in tandem to balance each other out with respect to thermal energy released and absorbed, minimizing temperature rise. Otherwise excessive exothermic heat because of high loading of a physical blowing agent can cause thermal degradation of a developing thermoset or polyurethane material. For instance, to avoid this in polyurethane systems isocyanate and water (which react to form carbon dioxide) are used in combination with liquid carbon dioxide (which boils to give gaseous form) in the production of very low density flexible PU foams for mattresses.
- Mechanically made foams and froths, involves methods of introducing bubbles into liquid polymerisable matrices (e.g. an unvulcanised elastomer in the form of a liquid latex). Methods include whisking-in air or other gases or low boiling volatile liquids in low viscosity lattices, or the injection of a gas into an extruder barrel or a die, or into injection molding barrels or nozzles and allowing the shear/mix action of the screw to disperse the gas uniformly to form very fine bubbles or a solution of gas in the melt. When the melt is molded or extruded and the part is at atmospheric pressure, the gas comes out of solution expanding the polymer melt immediately before solidification. Frothing (akin to beating egg whites making a meringue), is also used to stabilize foamed liquid reactants, e.g. to prevent slumping occurring on vertical walls before cure – (i.e. avoiding foam collapse and sliding down a vertical face due to gravity).
- Soluble fillers, e.g. solid sodium chloride crystals mixed into a liquid urethane system, which is then shaped into a solid polymer part, the sodium chloride is later washed out by immersing the solid molded part in water for some time, to leave small inter-connected holes in relatively high density polymer products, (e.g. Porvair synthetic leather materials for shoe uppers).
- Hollow spheres and porous particles (e.g. glass shells/spheres, epoxide shells, PVDC shells, fly ash, vermiculite, other reticulated materials) are mixed and dispersed in the liquid reactants, which are then shaped into a solid polymer part containing a network of voids.
- The blowing agent can affect the physical and mechanical properties of natural rubber.
