= Titanium foam =

Metallic material

Titanium foams exhibit high specific strength, high energy absorption, excellent corrosion resistance and biocompatibility. These materials are ideally suited for applications within the aerospace industry. An inherent resistance to corrosion allows the foam to be a desirable candidate for various filtering applications. Further, titanium's physiological inertness makes its porous form a promising candidate for biomedical implantation devices. The largest advantage in fabricating titanium foams is that the mechanical and functional properties can be adjusted through manufacturing manipulations that vary porosity and cell morphology. The high appeal of titanium foams is directly correlated to a multi-industry demand for advancement in this technology.

== Characterization ==
Banhart describes two dominating perspectives in which cellular metals are characterized, referring to them as atomistic and macroscopic. The atomistic (or molecular) perspective holds that a cellular material is a construction of struts, membranes, and other elements which possess mechanical properties of their bulk metal counterpart. Indeed, the physical, mechanical, and thermal properties of titanium foams are commonly measured using the same methods as that of their solid counterparts. From a macroscopic perspective, the cellular structure is perceived as a homogeneous structure and characterized by considering the effective (or averaged) material parameters.

== Microstructure ==
Titanium foams are characterized structurally by their pore topology (relative percentage of open vs. closed pores), porosity (the multiplicative inverse of relative density), pore size and shape, and anisotropy. Microstructures may be examined by optical microscopy, scanning electron microscopy and X-ray tomography.

Categorizing titanium foams in terms of pore structure (as either open- or close-celled) is the most basic form of differentiation. In close-celled foams, pores are composed of bubbles entrapped in the metallic solid. These foams consist of a continuous network of sealed pores wherein interconnections between the pores are virtually non-existent. Alternatively, in open-celled foams, the pores are interconnected and solid struts allow fluid to pass through.

Most manufactured foams contain both types of pores, although in many cases the subtype is minimal. According to the IUPAC, pore sizes are classified into three categories: micro (less than 2 nm), meso (between 2 and 50 nm) and macro (larger than 50 nm) pores.

== Mechanical properties ==
As with other metal foams, the properties of titanium foams depend mostly on the properties of the starting material and the relative density of the resultant foam. Thermal properties in foams – such as melting point, specific heat and expansion coefficient – remain constant for both the foams and the metals from which they are composed. However, the mechanical properties of foams are greatly influenced by microstructure, which include the aforementioned properties as well as anisotropy and defects within the foam's structure.

=== Sensitivity to impurities ===
The mechanical properties of titanium foams are sensitive to the presence of interstitial solutes, which present limitations to processing routes and utilization. Titanium has a high affinity for atmospheric gases. In foams, this is evidenced by the metal's tendency to trap oxides within cell edges. Micro-hardness of cell walls, elastic modulus, and yield strength increase as a result of interstitial solutes; ductility, which is a function of the quantity of interstitial impurities, is consequently reduced. Of the atmospheric gases, nitrogen has the most significant impact, followed by oxygen and carbon. These impurities are often present in the precursor mixture and also introduced during processing.

=== Theoretical models for predicting mechanical properties ===
==== Gibson & Ashby models ====
Gibson & Ashby micromechanical models for porous materials provide mathematical equations for the prediction of mechanical parameters based on experimentally determined geometric constants. The constants of proportionality are determined by fitting experimental data to various mathematical models for structures consisting of cubes and solid struts and are dependent upon cell geometry.

A limitation of the Gibson & Ashby model is that it is most accurate for foams exhibiting porosities higher than 70%, although experimental comparisons for lower porosity foams have shown agreement with this model. Ye & Dunand found reasonable agreement to the Gibson & Ashby model for titanium foams exhibiting 42% porosity. Ultrasonic measurements provided an average Young's modulus value of 39 GPa, which is in relatively good agreement with the Gibson & Ashby prediction of 35 GPa.

The Gibson & Ashby models assume ideal structures; microstructural irregularities (e.g. inhomogeneous pore distribution; defects) are not considered. Additionally, experimental results from which the predetermined proportionality constants were based on experimental values that were obtained from simple compression tests. Consequently, they may not be applicable for multiaxial loads.

==== Minimum solid area (MSA) models ====
Minimum solid area models assume that the load bearing area (cross-sectional area normal to the stress) is the logical basis for modeling mechanical behavior. MSA models assume pore interaction results in reduction of stress. Therefore, the minimum solid areas are the carriers of stress. As a result, predicted mechanical properties fluctuate based on the quantification of the solid area of the foam. For titanium foams consisting of partially sintered powders, the minimum solid area consists of the neck area between powders through the cross-section of cell walls between macropores. The mathematical relationships in MSA models are relatively consistent with the Gibson & Ashby model. However, the MSA models are designed to predict mechanical property parameters over a broader range of porosity levels. Like the Gibson & Ashby models, MSA models were derived assuming idealized (defect-free) structures containing uniform pore shapes, size and distribution.

=== Compressive properties ===
The most frequently reported mechanical property of titanium foams is compressive strength. It was generally accepted that the compressive properties of metal foams depended on the properties of the cell wall rather than on pore size. However, more recent research has indicated that smaller pore sizes equate to higher compressive strength. As pore sizes reach nano-dimensions, the relationship is even more clear due to changes in deformation mechanism.

Tuncer & Arslan fabricated titanium foams via the space-holder method using various shaped space-holders to elucidate the effect of cell morphology on mechanical properties. They found that foams created with needle-like urea space-holders exhibited a decrease in elastic modulus and yield strength when compared to spherical pores.

== Processing methods ==
Many metal foam manufacturing techniques are accomplished by the introduction of a gaseous phase into a precursor matrix, which can occur in either molten metal or a powdered metal form. Due to titanium's high melting point (1,670 °C (3,040 °F)) and high chemical affinity with oxygen, nitrogen, carbon and hydrogen (which dissolve rapidly either in liquid or solid titanium at a temperature above 400 °C (752 °F)), solid-state processes based on powder densification are the preferred method of fabrication.

Processing methods must also be designed to avoid exposure to air or moisture; vacuum or inert gas sintering processes are usually sufficient for preventing contamination.

=== Loose-powder (gravity) sintering ===
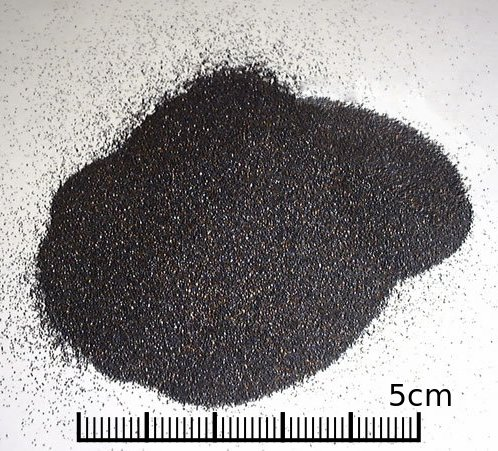
Titanium powder

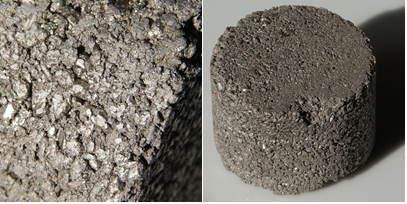
Titanium sponge cylinder produced via powder metallurgy, 120 grams, 3×4 cm.

Utilizing powder metallurgy routes for titanium foam fabrication allows for production at lower temperatures than those required through a melt process and reduces overall risks for contamination. In loose-powder sintering (also known as gravity sintering), pores are created through diffusion bonding arising from the voids existing between packed powder particles. Axial compaction followed by sintering follows the same procedure as above, but pressure is applied for compaction of the precursor material. For both compaction methods, the resulting pore morphology is dependent upon the morphology of the metallic powder, making it difficult to control the size, shape, and distribution of the pores. Another disadvantage includes the relatively high probability of pore collapse and limited achievable porosity levels.

=== Expansion of pressurized bubbles ===
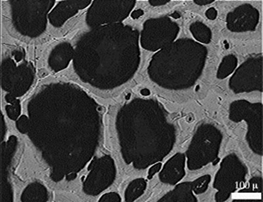
Titanium foamed with argon

To produce titanium foams via expansion of pressurized gas, the titanium precursor mixture is placed within a gas-tight metal can, which is evacuated after filling. The metal can is pressurized with inert gas — most commonly argon — and is pressed isostatically. The gas-filled pores are contained within the compacted matrix, and upon exposure to elevated temperatures, these bubbles expand through creep of the surrounding metal matrix. Since processing titanium foams using hot isostatic pressing (HIP) eliminates the need for separate compaction and sintering processes, a wider variety of custom shapes and sizes are possible than via loose powder sintering techniques.

Disadvantages of this process include reduced pore connectivity, limited achievable porosity, and a complicated experimental set-up. However, a unique aspect of the HIP process with respect to titanium (and other polymorphic materials) is that transformation superplasticity can be enhanced through the HIP process by way of thermal cycling, or by cycling around the alpha/beta allotropic temperature boundaries of the metal.

=== Superplastic expansion ===
Titanium undergoes allotropic transformation from its α-phase (hexagonal close-packed (hcp) structure at temperatures less than 882.5 °C (1,620.5 °F)) to its β-phase (body centered cubic, bcc) structure at temperatures above 882.3 °C (1,620.1 °F)). Alpha-phase titanium products typically exhibit medium to high strength with excellent creep strength, whereas beta-phase titanium products typically exhibit very high strength and low ductility. Foams created under thermal cycling conditions have been shown to exhibit increased porosity due to the density difference between allotropic phases. Davis et al. produced titanium foams with 41% porosity (as compared to 27% porosity through the normal HIP creep mechanism). Increases in overall ductility were also observed in foams created through thermal cycling. In a similar experiment, porosity of 44% was achieved and determined as the maximum achievable porosity under thermal cycling conditions.

A later study also utilized exploitation of transformation superplasticity conditions through HIP, but in this case, the titanium powder in the precursor matrix was replaced with titanium wires to create anisotropic pores. The resulting anisotropic pores showed closer correlation with natural bone in that the foams exhibited higher elastic moduli, yield strength and deformation when subjected to longitudinally loaded forces than when loads were applied transversely.

=== Space-holder technique ===
The space-holder technique is the most commonly employed method for producing titanium foams. The space-holder technique allows for the fabrication of higher porosity foams (35%–80%) than other techniques, while also giving the engineer more control over pore fraction, shape and connectivity. Mechanical properties can be adjusted through the size, shape and quantity of space-holders employed. The space-holder technique was first demonstrated by Zhao and Sun for the fabrication of aluminum foams in a powder metallurgical method, which consisted of the incorporation of NaCl as a space-holder. The space-holder was mixed into the powder mixture and dissolved prior to sintering. The same method was used to create titanium foams for the first time when Wen et al. utilized ammonium hydrogen carbonate spacers.

==== Powder selection ====
The size and shape of the metal powder has a direct impact on the stability of the precursor as well as the resulting foam. For this purpose, powders that increase packing efficiency are most advantageous. The use of spherical particles may result in less contact of particles which consequently leads to larger secondary pores and a higher probability of pore collapse prior to complete sintering. This factor can be limited through different compaction techniques that decrease the degree of interstitial sites around the titanium particles. However, this method also has limitations; for example, the powders cannot be compacted to such a degree that would promote deformation of the spacer (unless anisotropic pore shape is desired).

==== Space-holder selection ====
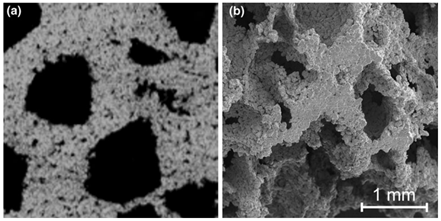
Computer tomography (a) and electron micrograph (b) of the Ti foam made with saccharose as a space holder, showing two types of pores in titanium foam

The selection of the space-holder is one of the most crucial steps because it defines many of the properties of the resulting foam, including cell shape, cell size and macroporosity. The space-holder should be inert and represent the size and shape of the desired pores. The porosity may be adjusted anywhere between 50% and 85% without the filler material becoming a part of the resultant foam. It is also important to select a spacer that has limited or no solubility in titanium, as this incorporation will affect the mechanical properties of the resulting foam.

==== Space-holder size and shape ====
The degree of homogeneity in pore distribution of the final product is primarily dependent on the adequacy of mixing of the precursor. The difference in particle size between the titanium powders and the spacers directly impacts the ability to adequately mix the preform. The greater the size difference, the more difficult it is to control this process. Nonhomogeneous mixing resulting from the use of spacers considerably larger than the titanium particles employed and has shown adverse effects in the stability of the precursor after removal of spacer and in the distribution of porosity. Spacer size has been investigated. It was shown that the use of a coarse spacer results in thicker pore walls while the use of finer spacers results in enhanced compaction, leading to increased densification.

Increased densification is evidenced by a monomodal pore distribution with the employment of fine spacers and a bimodal distribution using coarse spacers. Further, finer spacers result in a more homogeneous pore distribution. Sharma et al. utilized acicular spacers and achieved porosities up to 60% where pores were undistorted. In samples employing fine particles, porosities up to 70% were achievable before noting distortion in the pores. However, the bimodal pore distribution observed in coarse-spacer samples showed to be beneficial in terms of mechanical properties in that higher compressive strengths were observed, beyond those that might exist due to the inverse relationship of porosity and compressive strength alone.

==== Compaction ====
The precursor mixture of powders and space-holders are compacted into a mold under a specified pressure. This can be achieved through uniaxial or isostatic processes. The pores resulting from this method are open and interconnected via windows between neighboring pores with the size of the pores partially dependent upon the coordination number and contact area of the resulting compact. Compaction pressure must be high enough to ensure sufficient mechanical strength for retention of pore geometry specified by the space-holder, but not too high enough as to cause deformation of the space-holder.

==== Sintering and space-holder removal ====
When employing dissolvable spacers, it is possible to remove the spacer after sintering, which reduces the risk of pore collapse. In most cases, foams created using space-holders contain bimodal pore distributions with macro-sized pores resulting from the space-holder particles and micro-sized pores located on the pore walls and resulting from incomplete sintering of the powder matrix. As a result, the macropores typically exhibit rough internal surfaces. In some applications, such as for the use of bio-medical implants, this is an advantageous property. Inner porosity (or micro-porosity) has been shown to reduce stiffness; thus, reduce the risk of stress-shielding effects, while also offering improved osseointegration.

==== Space-holder materials ====
===== Sodium chloride (NaCl) =====
Sodium chloride is the most commonly chosen space-holder for titanium foams because it is highly soluble in water and inert with respect to titanium. This inertness prevents contamination and degradation of the mechanical properties of the resulting foam. Moreover, NaCl is non-toxic; any residuals are bioinert.

Bansiddhi & Dunand pioneered the use of NaCl as a permanent space-holder for the fabrication of NiTi foams. The resulting foams consisted of 32% to 36% porosity with more complete densification than they observed when producing NiTi foams using a sodium fluoride (NaF) space-holder. However, processing parameters resulted in molten NaCl and a metal/salt blend in the cavities of the foam. Certain risks are associated with using a molten space-holder including reaction with the metal, dissolving of the space-holder in the metal and prevention of densification through the creation of a thin layer of liquid between the metal and particles.

Near complete densification was achieved when NaCl was used as a permanent space-holder in pure titanium foam. In this case, a temperature below the melting point of NaCl was used; titanium is less creep resistant than NiTi, which allows for densification at lower temperatures. The resulting foams achieved porosity of 50% to 67% with minimal observable microporosity. Anisotropic pore shape in some areas alluded to NaCl's deformation during HIP, which is desirable for some applications. Additionally, an observed, rough inner surface of the pores holds advantages for biomedical implant applications.

Jha et al. achieved 65% to 80% porosity through the use of NaCl as a space-holder and a cold compaction process at various pressures with two-stage sintering. In this case, NaCl was removed through dissolution after the second stage of sintering. Resulting Young's moduli (8–15 GPa (1,200–2,200 ksi)) were considerably lower than the Young's modulus of 29 GPa (4,200 ksi) achieved for 50% porosity foams. This illustrates the known relationship between porosity and Young's modulus wherein Young's modulus decreases linearly with increasing porosity. Achievable porosity through the space-holder method is directly related to the type and amount of space-holder utilized (up to a threshold maximum achievable porosity level).

===== Magnesium =====
Magnesium can be removed either thermally or by reactive measures through the dissolution in acid. Esen & Bor found a critical content of magnesium as a space holder to be 55% to 60%, above which compacts shrink excessively during sintering. Foams ranging in porosity from 45% to 70% with a bimodal pore distribution and compressive strength of 15 MPa (2.2 ksi) (for 70% porosity) were demonstrated. Kim et al. fabricated foams with anisotropic pores through the intentional deformation of Mg particles during compaction in an effort to enhance mechanical properties. A final porosity of 70% equated to a yield strength of 38 MPa (5.5 ksi) for normal orientation of pores and 59 MPa (8.6 ksi) when pores were aligned with the direction of compression.

===== Urea =====
Another commonly employed space-holder for titanium foams is urea, which yielded porosities from 20% to 75%. Wen et al. produced foams exhibiting a bimodal pore distribution with porosities ranging from 55% to 75%, Young's moduli between 3–6.4 GPa (440–930 ksi), and a plateau stress of 10–35 MPa (1.5–5.1 ksi). An inverse relationship between plateau stress and porosity was observed with increased porosity resulting in decreased plateau stress. Tuncer et al. utilized urea in combination with irregularly shaped titanium powders in an effort to increase green strength through increased packing efficiency of particles. This also eliminated the need for the incorporation of a binder.

===== Tapioca starch =====
Tapioca starch can be burnt off easily through the sintering process and is insoluble in titanium. Titanium foams consisting of a bimodal pore distribution (macropores ranging from 100 to 300 μm) and 64% to 79% porosity, exhibited yield strengths of 23–41 MPa (3.3–5.9 ksi) and Young's moduli of 1.6–3.7 GPa (230–540 ksi).

===== Ammonium bicarbonate =====
Although ammonium bicarbonate has been utilized in the manufacturing of titanium foams, it is not an ideal spacer in that it has a low melting/dissociation point and some solubility in titanium. This results in considerable shrinkage which makes control of pore shape difficult. Furthermore, the decomposition releases environmentally harmful gases.

=== Freeze-casting ===
Freeze-casting solidification set-up.

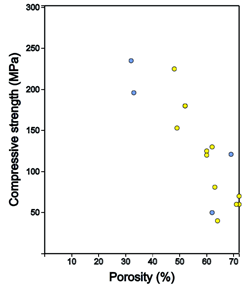
Compressive strength of freeze-cast titanium materials created via freeze-casting.

Freeze-casting is a directional solidification technique that is utilized to fabricate materials exhibiting anisotropic, elongated pore structures. Pore morphology is defined, in large part, by the morphology of the solidified fluid. Titanium foams exhibiting dendritic and lamellar pore structures have been produced, through the use of non-aqueous and aqueous processing respectively. These materials exhibit anisotropic mechanical properties as a result of their anisotropic pore structures. Compressive strength for loads applied parallel to the wall direction of titanium foams are found to be, on average, 2.5 times greater than for those applied perpendicular to the wall direction.

== Applications ==
Potential structural applications for titanium foams include their general incorporation into light-weight structures and as components for mechanical energy absorption. The most important considerations for the use of titanium foams in structural applications includes their porosity, specific strength, ductility in compression and cost. Because of low manufacturing costs, most metal foams marketed for structural applications are of a close-celled aluminum variety. In comparison, titanium foam manufacturing incurs a higher cost, but this cost is defensible in space applications where the material offers an otherwise incomparable reduction in overall weight. The lower thermal conductivity of titanium may also be appreciated in rocket construction. The specific strength, overall energy absorbing capability and high melting point all reinforce titanium's superiority to aluminum in aerospace and military applications. When used for aerospace applications, levels of porosity close to 90% are desired. Titanium foams are capable of retaining their high tensile strength at temperatures up to 400 °C; a limit imposed by the metal's low resistance to oxidation.

=== Aerospace applications ===
The driving force for titanium foam's replacement of existing materials in the aerospace sector results from the following five factors:

- Weight reduction: as a substitute for steels and nickel-based superalloys;
- Application temperature: as a substitute for aluminum and nickel-based alloys and steels
- Corrosion resistance: as a substitute for aluminum alloys and low-alloyed steels
- Galvanic compatibility: with polymer matrix composites as substitutes for aluminum alloys
- Space constraints: as substitutes for aluminum alloys and steels

The problem with engineering and its advanced branch of aerospace engineering is the efficient use of materials as well as increased service life.

==== Sandwich panel cores ====
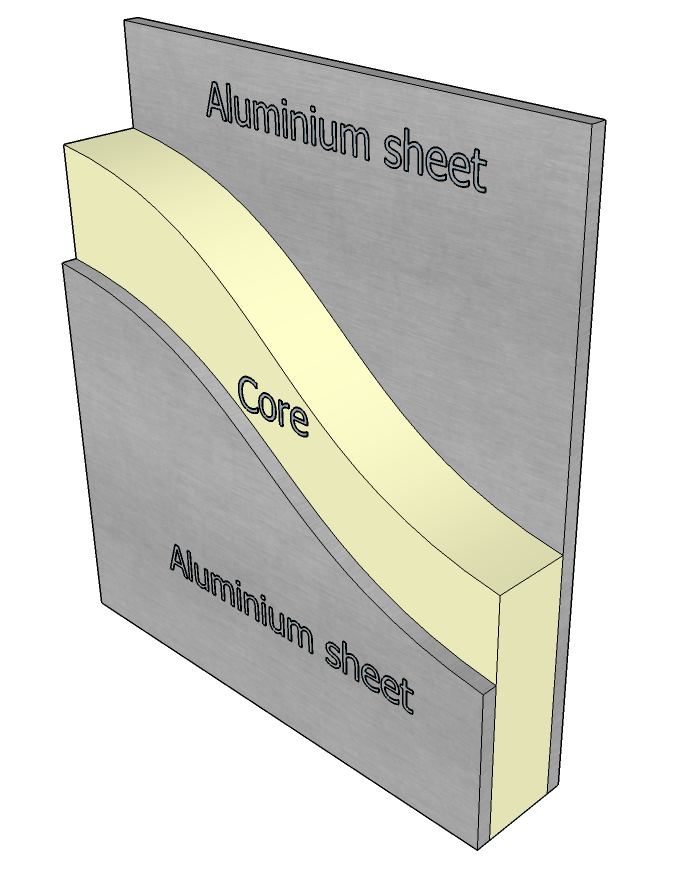
Model of a sandwich panel assembly

Sandwich panel cores are used throughout the aerospace industry; they are integrated within aircraft bodies, floors and internal panels. Sandwich constructions consist of two faces separated by a thick, light-weight core and are most commonly composed of balsa-wood, foamed polymers, glue-bonded aluminum or Nomex (paper) honeycombs. Typically, the cores are combined with reinforcing fibers to increase their shear modulus.

Indeed, carbon fiber-reinforced polymers exhibit the highest specific stiffness and strength of these materials. However, polymers decompose at low temperatures; thus employment of the aforementioned materials pose inherent challenges due to the limited range of temperature they may be utilized within as well as their moisture-dependent properties.

The largest and most inadequately predicted failure within the core results from strain localization. Strain localization refers to the development of bands exhibiting intensive straining as a result of the localization of deformations in the solid. For the best performance, the structure should exhibit low peak response force and high total energy absorption. Titanium foams are lightweight, stiff, and possess the capability to resist blast. Furthermore, the use of titanium-based foams exhibiting homogeneous porosity distribution would significantly decrease the risks associated with strain localization.

The high strength-to-weight ratio of titanium foams offers an opportunity to provide increased bending and shearing stiffness as well as energy absorption capabilities during periods of bending. Titanium foams may be utilized in environments with elevated temperatures (up to 400 °C (752 °F)). Composite structures may also be produced; the incorporation of silicon carbide monofilaments into Ti-6Al-4V foams was shown to exhibit an elastic modulus of 195 GPa (28,300 ksi) and tensile strength of 800 MPa (120 ksi).

===== Auxetic structures =====
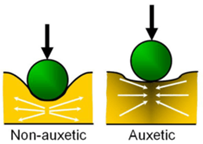

Titanium foams exhibiting auxetic pore structures are of interest for incorporation in sandwich panel cores due to their enhanced shear performance. Foams with this pore structure exhibit negative Poisson's ratio in one or more dimensions. Auxetic materials are typically able to resist indentations through their response to compression; upon compression, the auxetic material contracts. In addition to indentation resistance, research has shown that auxetic foams offer better absorption of sound and vibration, enhanced shear resistance and facture toughness. These structures also exhibit synclastic bending, which results lends itself to integration within curved sandwich panels.

=== Biomedical implants ===
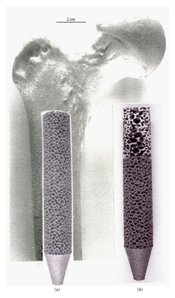
(a) Upper femur with simulated intramedullary rod insert fabricated from Ti-6Al-4V. (b) A through-section cutaway view illustrating inner, more porous foam core surrounded by more dense foam structure for stiffness compatibility.

Titanium alloys are the choice material for a diverse range of biomedical implants. Currently employed titanium alloy implants include: hip joints, bone screws, knee joints, spinal fusions, shoulder joints, and bone plates. These alloys range from high ductility, commercially-pure titanium foams with high formability, to heat-treatable alloys with high strength. Titanium is well-suited for use in magnetic resonance imaging (MRI) and computed tomography (CT), which further enhances its applicability for biomedical implant applications.

==== Bioimplants: microstructure ====
Biomedical implants should have low density for patient comfort and high porosity and surface area to facilitate vascularization and the ingrowth of new bone. Ideally, the implant will allow sufficiently easy fluid flow for cell nutrition and osteoblast multiplication as well as migration for cellular colonization of the implant to become uniform. The pores contained within the foam's cellular matrix mimic the extracellular matrix of bone, allowing the body to fixate with the implant. The porosity of the implant also promotes apposition and facilitates vascularization−as cells are able to attach, reproduce and form basic functions. It has been shown that a macropore size of 200–500 μm is preferred for ingrowths of new bone tissues and transportation of body fluids. The lower bound is controlled by the size of cells (~20 μm), and the upper bound is related to the specific surface area through the availability of binding sites. Finer pores further help in tissue growth and biofluid movement. Anisotropic, elongated pores (such as those attainable via the freeze-casting technique) may be beneficial in bone implants in that they can further mimic the structure of bone.

The porous surface geometry of the foam promotes bone in-growth, provides anchorage for fixation, and ensures stresses are transferred from the implant to the bone. Surface roughness in the pore can enhance bone in-growth, and coarser cell size facilitates faster tissue growth. To optimize the implant's functionality and ability to successfully fuse with bone, it may be necessary to manipulate the material's manufacturing methods in order to modify the foam's pore structure. Changes in pore structure can directly influence implant strength as well as other key properties.

==== Bioimplants: mechanical properties ====
Human cancellous bone possesses a stiffness ranging from 12 to 23 GPa; careful control and modification of manufacturing parameters to achieve similar strengths is imperative for practicality of integration. Correctly predicting the Young's modulus for foams is imperative for actual biomedical integration; a mismatch of Young's moduli between the implant and the bone can result in stress-shielding effects from a disproportional handling of stress. The implant which typically exhibits a higher Young's modulus than the bone will absorb most of the load. As a result of this imbalance, the starting bone density will be reduced, there will be tissue death and, eventually, implant failure.

Natural bone exhibits the ability to adjust local fiber away from the low-stress regions toward high stress regions through the distribution of porosity, thus maximizing overall comfort. Using finite element analysis, researchers examined the effect of filling pores with bone on mechanical properties. They concluded that bone ingrowth significantly improved the mechanical properties, evidenced by decreased localized plasticity and stress concentrations. In effect, the titanium foam in the study allowed the bone to exhibit its natural ability to adjust local fiber away from the low-stress regions toward high stress regions.

Experiments demonstrated that random combinations of pore size and shape result in lower Young's moduli. Theoretical models for the quantification of Young's moduli do not account for random pore size and shape distribution, so experimental measurements must be conducted in the presence of heterogeneous pore size and distribution. This is a limitation of the micro-mechanical models discussed above.

==== Osseointegration ====
Currently utilized implants take a great deal of time to integrate with the body after the initial surgical procedure occurs. True adhesion between the implant and the bone has been difficult to achieve and, unfortunately, success rates of implant fixation are low due to the implant's failure to achieve long-term osseointegration into the bone. With an increasing number of individuals requiring orthopedic implants, the development of materials with structural and biological potential to improve osseointegration is crucial. Utilization of titanium-based foams present one way to potentially improve the bioactivity and reduce stress-shielding effects of currently employed bioimplant materials.

The problem of osseointegration is best understood by examining the process of natural bone growth. In the body, bone and tissues experience self-regeneration, and structural modifications occur normally in response to environmental stimuli. Successful osseointegration occurs in three main stages that follow a natural biologically determined procedure: 1) incorporation of the implant into the bone's formation, 2) adaption of the new bone mass to carry weight and 3) remodeling of the new bone structure. The first stage in this process is the most crucial for overall success; the implant and the bone must form a rapid connection, and this bond must be strong and enduring. Owing to its porous structure, a titanium metal foam implant may be able to achieve close fixation with the bone and will decrease patient recovery time considerably. Essentially, the foam becomes an extracellular matrix in the body as tissue is integrated into it. Today, the implants most commonly used for bone replacement lack the ability to promote these characteristics, which are found in natural bone and, as a result, the implants have limited lifetimes. This phenomenon of osseointegration works similarly to direct fracture healing. However, instead of a bone fragment-end reconnecting to bone, the fragment-end connects to an implant surface. In a study on fibroblastic interactions with high-porosity Ti6Al4V alloy, the metal foam was supportive of cell attachment and proliferation, migration through the porous network, and proved capable of sustaining a large cell population.

==== Increasing bioactivity via coatings ====
Titanium's propensity to form an oxide layer on its surface prevents corrosion of surfaces that are in contact with human tissues because the surface oxides minimize diffusion of metal ions from the bulk material to the surface. When titanium gains a coating to make it more bioactive, it can turn the already biocompatible titanium surface into an interface able to enhance osteoblast adhesion and able to promote osseointegration. Today, research is heavily focused on improving the success rate of integration and uses an understanding of the natural process of bone growth and repair to create coatings that will enhance the surface finish and surface properties of the implant. These adjustments allow the artificial structure to mimic biological materials and to gain acceptance into the body with fewer negative side effects. A 3-year clinical and radiographic study found implants in humans coated by nanocrystalline hydroxylapatite (HA) to support osseointegration. The nanocrystalline HA was developed with a large rough surface of interconnecting pores between 10 and 20 nm of the silica matrix gel, resulting in a porous bone structure. Mean rates of marginal bone loss were insignificant and the periotest values were indicative of a solid osseointegration. In effect, the pores are structured in such a way that they are able hold onto the proteins on the biomaterial's surface. Ideally, this allows the body to engage in self-repair in that the synthetic HA is recognized as a like-nanomaterial in which live tissues may develop

Titanium foams can be coated with HA through various methods including plasma spraying, sol-gel and electrophoretic deposition. It has been shown that HA-coated titanium exhibits increased interfacial strength in comparison to titanium foams without the coating. In an effort to enhance bone in-growth, Spoerke et al. developed a method for growing organoapatites on titanium implants. Organoapatites may assist in-bone in-growth at the implant interface. The foams were manufactured using a modified HIP process, which exploits the allotropic nature of titanium to create higher porosity foams. Previous in vitro experimentation with the organoapatite-titanium foam held promising results including the possibility that ingrown tissue within these coated pores will improve the lifetime use of the foam through reduction of stress-shielding effects.

==== Animal studies ====
In the lab, synthetic nanocrystalline bone grafting material in mice has shown in-growth of vascularized fibrous tissue which resulted in improved healing. Furthermore, new blood vessels were observed at day 5 after implantation, and the implant showed a high functional vessel density. In a study examining the femoral epiphyses of rabbits in two to eight weeks of healing, bone-to-implant contact was compared to bone growth inside the chambers for four different implant surfaces. The researchers found that bone substitute materials may improve the bone apposition onto titanium.

== See also ==
- Metal foam
- Titanium
