= Aluminum polymer composite =

Material combining aluminum with a polymer

An aluminum polymer composite (APC) material combines aluminum with a polymer to create materials with interesting characteristics. In 2014 researchers used a 3d laser printer to produce a polymer matrix. When coated with a 50–100 nanometer layer of aluminum oxide, the material was able to withstand loads of as much as 280 megapascals, stronger than any other known material whose density was less than 1,000 kilograms per cubic metre (1,700 lb/cu yd), that of water.

== Aluminum foam ==
Spherical aluminum foam pieces bonded by polymers produced foams that were 80–95% metal. Such foams were test-manufactured on an automated assembly line and are under consideration as automobile parts.

== Thermal conductivity ==
Experimentally determined thermal conductivity of specific APCs matched both the Agari and Bruggeman models provide a good estimation for thermal conductivity (around 1000–1500 J/kg⋅K) The experimental values of both thermal conductivity and diffusivity have shown a better heat transport for the composite filled with large particles.

== See also ==
- Aluminium composite panels
- Aluminum foam
