= Porvair =

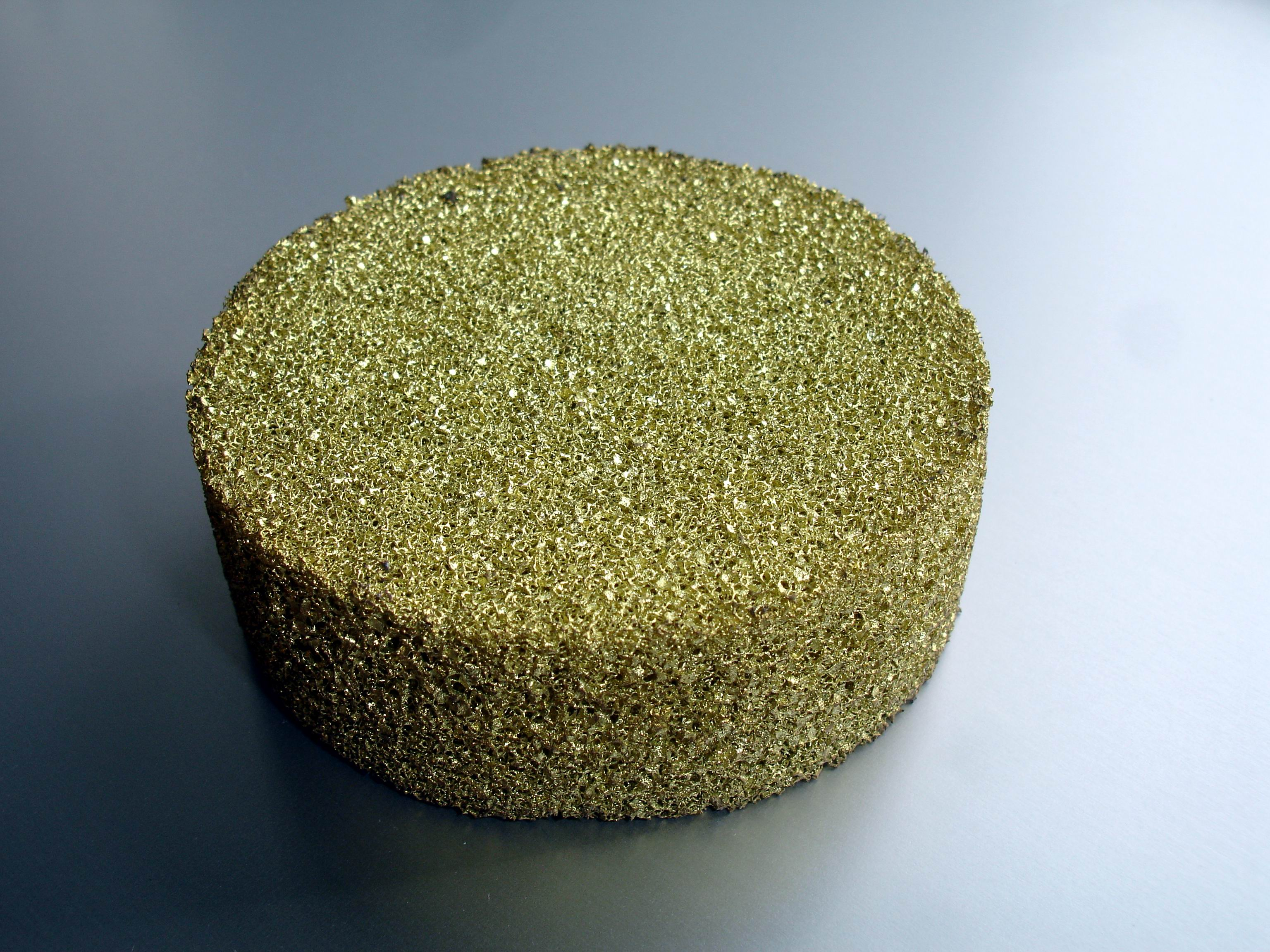
Brass metal foam disc made for water treatment by Porvair

Porvair is a British materials company that manufactures filtration materials for uses such as manufacturing, molten metal processing and water treatment.

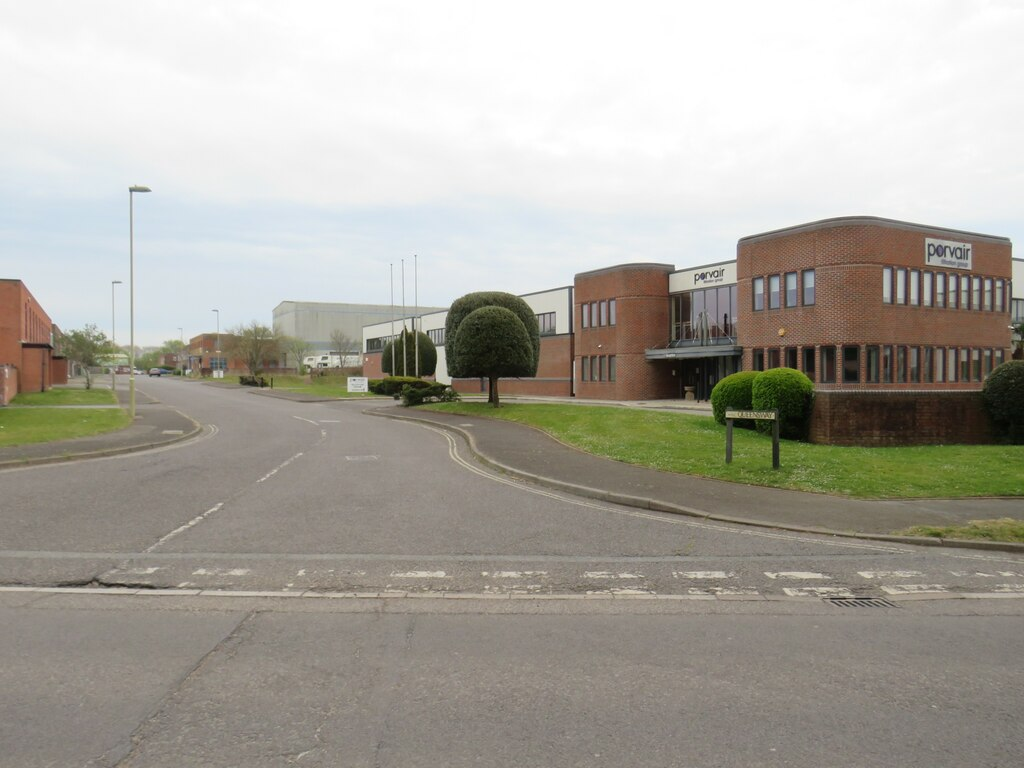
Premises in New Milton, Hampshire, England

It is based in King's Lynn in Norfolk and is listed on the London Stock Exchange. It took over German materials company Drache Umwelttechnik in 2026.
