= Titanium hydride =

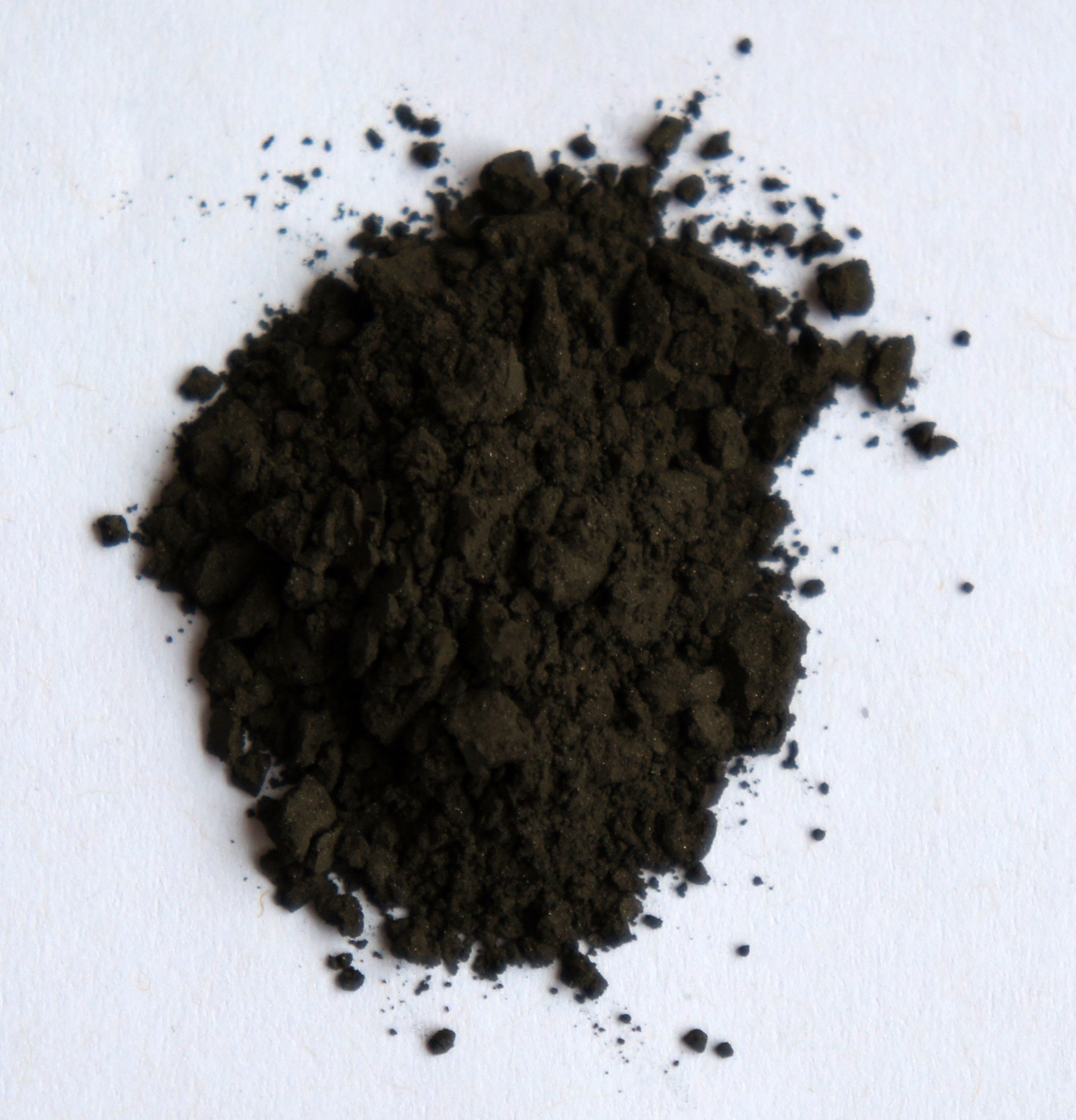
- Titanium hydride powder

Names
- IUPAC name titanium dihydride (hydrogen deficient)

Identifiers
| CAS Number | 7704-98-5 |
| 3D model (JSmol) | Interactive image |
| ChemSpider | 170691 |
| ECHA InfoCard | 100.028.843 |
| EC Number | 231-726-8 |
| PubChem CID | 197094 |
| UNII | 8930U91840 |
| UN number | 1871 (TITANIUM HYDRIDE) |
| CompTox Dashboard (EPA) | DTXSID60894225 |
- InChI: InChI=1S/Ti.2H/q+2;2*-1 Key: KAZWGWWZKAHTKC-UHFFFAOYSA-N
- SMILES: [H-].[H-].[Ti+2]

Properties
| Chemical formula | TiH_{2} (Non-stoichiometric TiH_{2−x}) |
| Molar mass | 49.883 g·mol^{−1} |
| Appearance | gray-black powder |
| Density | 3.75 g/cm^{3} |
| Melting point | ≈ 450 °C (842 °F; 723 K) (decomposes) |
| Solubility in water | insoluble |

Structure
| Crystal structure | Tetragonal |
| Space group | I4/mmm |
| Point group | 4/mmm |
| Lattice constant | a = 3.20 Å, b = 3.20 Å, c = 4.17 Å α = 90°, β = 90°, γ = 90° |
| Lattice volume (V) | 42.73 Å^{3} |
| Formula units (Z) | 2 |

Hazards
- GHS labelling
| Pictograms | (GHS02: Flammable) |
| Signal word | Danger |
| Hazard statements | H228 |
| Precautionary statements | P210, P240, P241, P280, P370+P378 |
| NFPA 704 (fire diamond) | 1 3 0 |
| Autoignition temperature | 224 °C (435 °F; 497 K) |
- Except where otherwise noted, data are given for materials in their standard state (at 25 °C [77 °F], 100 kPa). verify (what is ?) Infobox references

Titanium hydride normally refers to the inorganic compound TiH_{2} and related nonstoichiometric materials. It is commercially available as a stable grey/black powder, which is used as an additive in the production of Alnico sintered magnets, in the sintering of powdered metals, the production of metal foam, the production of powdered titanium metal and in pyrotechnics.

Also known as titanium–hydrogen alloy, it is an alloy of titanium, hydrogen, and possibly other elements. When hydrogen is the main alloying element, its content in the titanium hydride is between 0.02% and 4.0% by weight. Alloying elements intentionally added to modify the characteristics of titanium hydride include gallium, iron, vanadium, and aluminium.

== Production ==
In the commercial process for producing non-stoichiometric TiH_{2−x}, titanium metal sponge is treated with hydrogen gas at atmospheric pressure at between 300-500 °C. Absorption of hydrogen is exothermic and rapid, changing the color of the sponge grey/black. The brittle product is ground to a powder, which has a composition around TiH_{1.95}.

In the laboratory, titanium hydride is produced by heating titanium sponge in a hydrogen atmosphere at over 300 °C (572 °F), with rapid absorption beginning over 400 °C (752 °F). The titanium and hydrogen must be highly pure to approach stoichiometric ratios. The idealized equation is:

Ti + H_{2} → TiH_{2}

Other methods of producing titanium hydride include electrochemical and ball milling methods.

== Reactions ==
TiH_{1.95} is unaffected by water and air. It is slowly attacked by strong acids and is degraded by hydrofluoric and hot sulfuric acids. It reacts rapidly with oxidizing agents, this reactivity leading to the use of titanium hydride in pyrotechnics.

The material has been used to produce highly pure hydrogen, which is released upon heating the solid. Hydrogen release in TiH_{~2} starts just above 400 °C but may not be complete until the melting point of titanium metal. Titanium tritide (TiT_{x}) has been proposed for long-term storage of tritium gas.

== Structure ==
As TiH_{x} approaches stoichiometry, it adopts a distorted body-centered tetragonal structure, termed the ε-form with an axial ratio of less than 1. This composition is very unstable with respect to partial thermal decomposition, unless maintained under a pure hydrogen atmosphere. Otherwise, the composition rapidly decomposes at room temperature until an approximate composition of TiH_{1.74} is reached. This composition adopts the fluorite structure, and is termed the δ-form, and only very slowly thermally decomposes at room temperature until an approximate composition of TiH_{1.47} is reached, at which point, inclusions of the hexagonal close packed α-form, which is the same form as pure titanium, begin to appear.

The evolution of the dihydride from titanium metal and hydrogen has been examined in some detail. α-Titanium has a hexagonal close packed (hcp) structure at room temperature. Hydrogen initially occupies tetrahedral interstitial sites in the titanium. As the H/Ti ratio approaches 2, the material adopts the β-form to a face centred cubic (fcc), δ-form, the H atoms eventually filling all the tetrahedral sites to give the limiting stoichiometry of TiH_{2}. The various phases are described in the table below.

Temperature approx. 500 °C (932 °F), taken from illustration
| Phase | Weight % H | Atomic % H | TiH_{x} | Metal lattice |
|---|---|---|---|---|
| α | 0 – 0.2 | 0 – 8 | TiH_{0} – TiH_{0.1} | hcp |
| α & β | 0.2 – 1.1 | 8 – 34 | TiH_{0.1} – TiH_{0.5} | |
| β | 1.1 – 1.8 | 34 – 47 | TiH_{0.5} – TiH_{0.9} | bcc |
| β & δ | 1.8 – 2.5 | 47 – 57 | TiH_{0.9} – TiH_{1.32} | |
| δ | 2.7 – 4.1 | 57 – 67 | TiH_{1.32} – TiH_{2} | fcc |

If titanium hydride contains 4.0% hydrogen at less than around 40 °C (104 °F) then it transforms into a body-centred tetragonal (bct) structure called ε-titanium.

When titanium hydrides with less than 1.3% hydrogen, known as hypoeutectoid titanium hydride are cooled, the β-titanium phase of the mixture attempts to revert to the α-titanium phase, resulting in an excess of hydrogen. One way for hydrogen to leave the β-titanium phase is for the titanium to partially transform into δ-titanium, leaving behind titanium that is low enough in hydrogen to take the form of α-titanium, resulting in an α-titanium matrix with δ-titanium inclusions.

A metastable γ-titanium hydride phase has been reported. When α-titanium hydride with a hydrogen content of 0.02-0.06% is quenched rapidly, it forms into 𝛾-titanium hydride, as the atoms "freeze" in place when the cell structure changes from hcp to fcc. 𝛾-Titanium takes a body centred tetragonal (bct) structure. Moreover, there is no compositional change so the atoms generally retain their same neighbours.

== Hydrogen embrittlement in titanium and titanium alloys ==
Selected colours achievable through anodization of titanium.

The absorption of hydrogen and the formation of titanium hydride are a source of damage to titanium and titanium alloys. This hydrogen embrittlement process is of particular concern when titanium and alloys are used as structural materials, as in nuclear reactors.

Hydrogen embrittlement manifests as a reduction in ductility and eventually spalling of titanium surfaces. The effect of hydrogen is to a large extent determined by the composition, metallurgical history and handling of the Ti and Ti alloy. CP-titanium (commercially pure: ≤99.55% Ti content) is more susceptible to hydrogen attack than pure α-titanium. Embrittlement, observed as a reduction in ductility and caused by the formation of a solid solution of hydrogen, can occur in CP-titanium at concentrations as low as 30–40 ppm. Hydride formation has been linked to the presence of iron in the surface of a Ti alloy. Hydride particles are observed in specimens of Ti and Ti alloys that have been welded, and because of this welding is often carried out under an inert gas shield to reduce the possibility of hydride formation.

Ti and Ti alloys form a surface oxide layer, composed of a mixture of Ti(II), Ti(III) and Ti(IV) oxides, which offers a degree of protection to hydrogen entering the bulk. The thickness of this can be increased by anodizing, a process which also results in a distinctive colouration of the material. Ti and Ti alloys are often used in hydrogen containing environments and in conditions where hydrogen is reduced electrolytically on the surface. Pickling, an acid bath treatment which is used to clean the surface can be a source of hydrogen.

== Uses ==
Common applications include ceramics, pyrotechnics, sports equipment, as a laboratory reagent, as a blowing agent, and as a precursor to porous titanium. When heated as a mixture with other metals in powder metallurgy, titanium hydride releases hydrogen which serves to remove carbon and oxygen, producing a strong alloy.

The density of titanium hydride varies based on the alloying constituents, but for pure titanium hydride it ranges between 3.76 and 4.51 g/cm^{3}.

Even in the narrow range of concentrations that make up titanium hydride, mixtures of hydrogen and titanium can form a number of different structures, with very different properties. Understanding such properties is essential to making quality titanium hydride. At room temperature, the most stable form of titanium is the hexagonal close-packed (HCP) structure α-titanium. It is a fairly hard metal that can dissolve only a small concentration of hydrogen, no more than 0.20 wt% at 464 °C (867 °F), and only 0.02% at 25 °C (77 °F). If titanium hydride contains more than 0.20% hydrogen at titanium hydride-making temperatures it transforms into a body-centred cubic (BCC) structure called β-titanium. It can dissolve considerably more hydrogen, more than 2.1% hydrogen at 636 °C (1,177 °F). If titanium hydride contains more than 2.1% at 636 °C (1,177 °F) then it transforms into a face-centred cubic (FCC) structure called δ-titanium. It can dissolve even more hydrogen, as much as 4.0% hydrogen 37 °C (99 °F), which reflects the upper hydrogen content of titanium hydride.

There are many types of heat treating processes available to titanium hydride. The most common are annealing and quenching. Annealing is the process of heating the titanium hydride to a sufficiently high temperature to soften it. This process occurs through three phases: recovery, recrystallization, and grain growth. The temperature required to anneal titanium hydride depends on the type of annealing. Annealing must be done under a hydrogen atmosphere to prevent outgassing.

== See also ==
- Machinability
