= Anti-intrusion bar =

Vehicle safety device

An anti-intrusion bar or beam is a passive safety device, installed in most cars and other ground vehicles, which must protect passengers from side impacts. Side impacts are particularly dangerous for two reasons: a) the location of impact is very close to the passenger, who can be immediately reached by the impacting vehicle; b) in many side-impact accidents, the impacting vehicle may be larger, taller, heavier, or structurally stiffer than the struck vehicle. The role of an anti-intrusion bar is to absorb the kinetic energy of the colliding vehicles that is partially converted into internal work of the members involved in the crash.

Designs to counteract side impact collisions were explored as early as 1969 by General Motors, and Ford was issued a patent for the technology in 1975. Volvo introduced the Side Impact Protection System for its 700, 800, and 900 series cars in the early 1990s.

== Performance ==
The performance of a side beam is measured by several indicators. The most important are:

- the Specific Energy Absorption (SEA), which measures the amount of energy absorbed per unit mass;
- and the energy efficiency η, which is the ratio between the mean load and the peak load transmitted to the vehicle during the impact.

Furthermore:

- the amount of intrusion, for a given energy, must be as small as possible;
- the maximum depth or diameter of the bar must be reasonably small, as the vehicle door does not generally allow much space;
- the cost of the member must be reasonably small.

== Typical design ==
The anti-intrusion beams commonly span the length of the door at about a vertical midsection of the door. As the figure shows, the typical profiles can be open or closed (tubular, usually with a round cross section). They are conventionally made by stamping or hydroforming processes. When the cross section is closed, the tubes can be used as-received. In the scientific and technical literature, some unconventional designs have been proposed.

== Typical materials ==
The anti-intrusion bars are generally made of high strength steels. However, some studies indicate that stainless steel 304 might be a better choice, because of its larger plastic field and a larger amount of potentially absorbed energy before fracture. In the scientific and technical literature, some unconventional material combinations have been proposed, too, e.g. based on metal foam filled tubes or composite materials.

== See also ==
- List of auto parts
