= Aluminium foam sandwich =

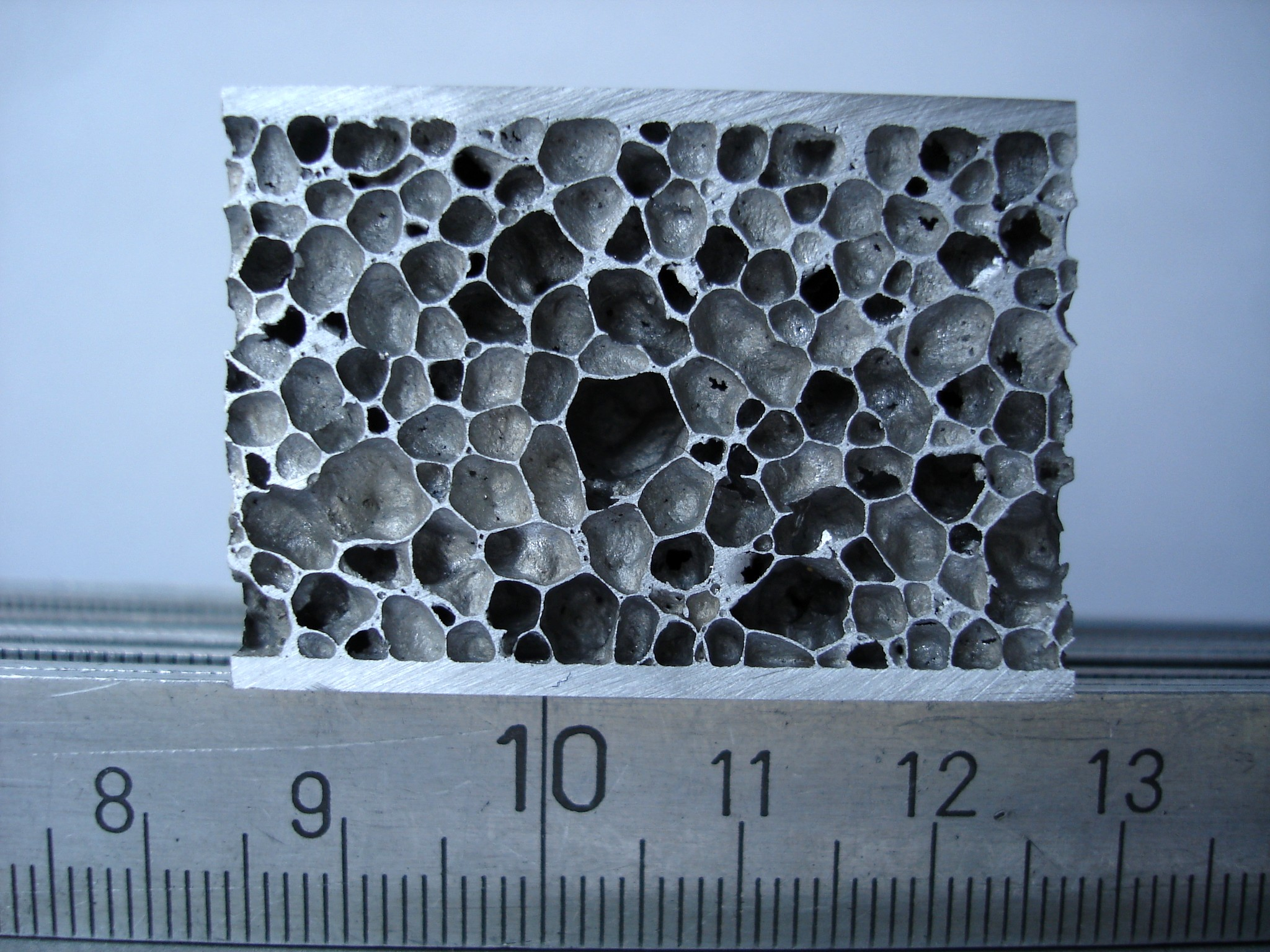
Aluminium foam sandwich

Aluminium foam sandwich (AFS) is a sandwich panel product which is made of two metallic dense face sheets and a metal foam core made of an aluminium alloy. AFS is an engineering structural material owing to its stiffness-to-mass ratio and energy absorption capacity ideal for application such as the shell of a high-speed train.

== Production and materials ==
In terms of the bonding between face sheets and foam core the processing of AFS is categorised into two ways – ex-situ and in-situ bonding.

=== Ex-situ bonded AFS ===
Ex-situ bonding is achieved by gluing face sheets with an aluminium foam by adhesive bonding, brazing or diffusion bonding. Foams used in this method are either closed-cell or open-cell. When a closed-cell foam is used then it is produced from aluminium alloys either by liquid metal route (e.g. Alporas, Cymat) or by powder metallurgy route. Open-cell foam core is made of aluminium and other metals as well. Face sheets are chosen from a variety of aluminium alloy, and other metals such as steel.

=== In-situ bonded AFS ===
For in-situ bonded face sheets the core is closed-cell foam. The goal of in-situ bonding is to create a metallic bonding between the foam core and face sheets. This is achieved in three ways. A foamable precursor is expanded between two face sheets. When the liquid foam comes in contact with the solid face sheets a metallic bond is established. This is difficult to realize as the oxidation of both aluminium face sheets and foam prevent forming a sound bonding. There is also a risk of melting the face sheets. This procedure is successful when steel is used as face sheets instead of aluminium, while the foam core is aluminium.

Another strategy is to rapidly solidify the surface of a foamable molten metal before it can foam into a dense skin while the interior of the metal evolves to a foam structure. This process yields in an integral-type foam structure. Integral foam sandwich is made of aluminium alloys (AlCu4, AlSi9Cu3) and magnesium alloys (AZ91, AM60). In this process the material for the core and face sheet is the same.

The third way to achieve in-situ bonding consists of compaction of metal powders together with face sheets. This sandwich-compact assembly goes through several rolling steps to attain desired precursor and face sheet thickness. After which this three-layer composite is heated to transform the core layer into foam. The melting point of the face sheet material is above the melting point of the foamable precursor material. The precursor composition is usually Al-Si, Al-Si-Cu or Al-Si-Mg alloys while the face sheets are 3xxx, 5xxx and 6xxx series aluminium alloys.

== Pre- and post-processing of AFS panels ==
It is possible to manufacture a complicated 3D shape from in-situ bonded AFS. In case of the second type, i.e. integral foam moulding, the desired geometry of the foamed part is achieved by designing the mould inside which the foam is cast.

In the case of the third type the three-layer composite precursor is reshaped prior to foaming. Heating of such part yields in a 3D shaped foam part. The three-layer composite AFS panels are also reshaped after foaming by forging. If an AFS is made of heat treatable alloys, the strength is further enhanced by age hardening. In order to join two AFS parts or to join an AFS part with a metallic part several joining technologies are employed, such as laser welding, TIG welding, MIG welding, riveting, etc.

== Literature ==
- Thomas Hipke, Günther Lange, René Poss: Taschenbuch für Aluminiumschäume. Aluminium-Verlag, Düsseldorf 2007, ISBN 978-3-87017-285-5.
- Hannelore Dittmar-Ilgen: Metalle lernen schwimmen. In: Dies.: Wie der Kork-Krümel ans Weinglas kommt. Hirzel, Stuttgart 2006, ISBN 978-3-7776-1440-3, S. 74.
