= Carbon nanofoam =

Carbon nanofoam is an allotrope of carbon discovered in 1997 by Andrei V. Rode and co-workers at the Australian National University in Canberra. It consists of a cluster-assembly of carbon atoms strung together in a loose three-dimensional web. The fractal-like bond structure consists of sp^{2} graphite-like clusters connected by sp^{3} bonds. The sp^{3} bonds are located mostly on the surface of the structure and make up 15% to 45% of the material, making its framework similar to diamond-like carbon films. The material is remarkably light, with a density of 2-10 × 10^{−3} g/cm^{3} (0.0012 lb/ft^{3}) and is similar to an aerogel. Other remarkable physical properties include the large surface area of 300–400 m^{2}/g (similar to zeolites). 1 US gallon (3.8 L; 0.83 imp gal) of nanofoam weighs about 0.25 ounces (7.1 g).

Each cluster is about 6 nanometers wide and consists of about 4000 carbon atoms linked in graphite-like sheets that are given negative curvature by the inclusion of heptagons among the regular hexagonal pattern. This is the opposite of what happens in the case of buckminsterfullerenes in which carbon sheets are given positive curvature by the inclusion of pentagons.

The large-scale structure of carbon nanofoam is similar to that of an aerogel, but with 1% of the density of previously produced carbon aerogels—or only a few times the density of air at sea level. Unlike carbon aerogels, carbon nanofoam is a poor electrical conductor. The nanofoam contains numerous unpaired electrons, which Rode and colleagues propose is due to carbon atoms with only three bonds that are found at topological and bonding defects. This gives rise to what is perhaps carbon nanofoam's most unusual feature: it is attracted to magnets, and below −183 °C can itself be made magnetic.

Carbon nanofoam is the only form of pure carbon known to be ferromagnetic which is unusual for a carbon allotrope. Ferromagnetism is an intrinsic property observed in the carbon nanofoam and may be accounted for by its complex structure. Impurities in the material are excluded as the source of magnetism as they are not sufficient for the strong magnetization observed. Researchers postulate that embedded carbon atoms with unpaired electrons carry enough of a magnetic moment to lead to strong magnetization. The sheet curvature localizes unpaired electrons by breaking up the π-electron clouds and sterically protects the electrons which normally would be too reactive to persist. The ferromagnetism of the carbon nanofoam is sensitive to time and temperature. Some magnetism is lost within the first few hours of synthesis, however most of it is persistent. Carbon nanofoam may have some application in spintronic devices which exploits electron spin as a further degree of freedom.

Carbon nanofoam may be suitable for hydrogen storage due to its low density and high surface area. Preliminary experimentation has shown that hydrogen can be stored in the nanofoam at room temperature in a reversible process.

== Synthesis ==
Carbon nanofoam clusters can be synthesized through high-repetition-rate laser ablation in inert gases such as argon. Short (fs), low-energy (μJ) pulses delivered at high rates of repetition (10 kHz – 100 MHz) generate carbon vapors for deposition. Ambient gas is heated from room temperature with the atomized carbon which leads to an increase in the partial density of the carbon in the chamber. In optimal conditions, the inert gas does not cool down but maintains its high temperature between cycles of formation. Subsequent cycles in the chamber are carried out at temperatures above the formation threshold temperature initiating sp^{2} bonding. The increase in density and temperature promotes favorable conditions for the formation of carbonaceous clusters. The rate of consumption exceeds the rate of evaporation by laser ablation and thus the formation is in a non-equilibrium state.

== See also ==
- Truncated order-7 triangular tiling
