= Ceramic foam =

Material

Ceramic foam is a tough foam made from ceramics. Manufacturing techniques include impregnating open-cell polymer foams internally with ceramic slurry and then firing in a kiln, leaving only ceramic material. The foams may consist of several ceramic materials such as aluminium oxide, a common high-temperature ceramic, and gets insulating properties from the many tiny air-filled voids within the material.

The foam can be used not only for thermal insulation, but for a variety of other applications such as acoustic insulation, absorption of environmental pollutants, filtration of molten metal alloys, and as substrate for catalysts requiring large internal surface area.

It has been used as stiff lightweight structural material, specifically for support of reflecting telescope mirrors.

== Properties ==
Ceramic foams are hardened ceramics with pockets of air or another gas trapped in pores throughout the body of the material. With its ability to create a large specific surface area, these materials can be fabricated as high as 94 to 96% air by volume with temperature resistances as high as 1700 °C. Because many ceramics are already oxides or other inert compounds, there is little danger of oxidation or reduction of the material.

Previously, pores had been avoided in ceramic components due to their brittle properties. However, in practice ceramic foams have somewhat advantageous mechanical properties, showing high strength and plastic toughness, compared to bulk ceramics. One example is crack propagation, given by:

$\sigma_t = 2\sigma\left ( \frac{a}{r} \right )^\frac{1}{2}$

where σ_{t} is the stress at the tip of the crack, σ is the applied stress, a is the crack size and r is the radius of curvature. For certain stress applications, this means ceramic foams actually outperform bulk ceramics because the porous pockets of air act to blunt the crack tip radius, leading to a disruption of its propagation and a decrease in the likelihood of failure.

== Preparation methods ==
=== Organic foam impregnating method ===
The organic foam impregnating method is one of the more widely used in industry, creating the ceramic foam with a 3D mesh skeleton structure and coat a ceramic slurry on a polyurethane organic foam mesh body. The ceramic foam is obtained by allowing the body to dry at room temperature and burn the mesh body to retrieve the ceramic foam. This method is best used to prepare silicon carbide foam ceramics.

=== Foaming Method ===
The foaming method uses a chemical reaction of a foaming agent. The foaming agent generates volatile gas that foams the slurry. The slurry is dried and sintered to obtain the ceramic foam. The product's shape and density can be controlled and manipulated with the foaming method. This method can be used in the preparation of small pore size closed cell ceramics.

== Manufacturing ==
Much like metal foams, there are a number of accepted methods for creating ceramic foams. One of the earliest and still most common is the polymeric sponge method. A polymeric sponge is covered with a ceramic in suspension, and after rolling to ensure all pores have been filled, the ceramic-coated sponge is dried and pyrolysed to decompose the polymer, leaving only the porous ceramic structure. The foam must then be sintered for final densification. This method is widely used because it is effective with any ceramic able to be suspended; however, large amounts of gaseous byproducts are released and cracking due to differences in thermal expansion coefficients is common.

While the above are both based on the use of a sacrificial template, there are also direct foaming methods that can be used. These methods involve pumping air into a suspended ceramic before setting and sintering. This is difficult because wet foams are thermodynamically unstable and can end up with very large pores after setting.

A recent method of creating aluminum oxide foams has also been developed. This technique involves heating crystals with the metal and forming compounds until a solution is created. At this point, polymer chains form and grow, causing the entire mixture to separate into a solvent and polymer. As the mixture begins to boil, air bubbles are trapped in solution and locked in to place as the material is heated and polymer is burned off.

== Use ==
=== Insulation ===
Due to ceramics' extremely low thermal conductivity, the most obvious use of a ceramic is as an insulation material. Ceramic foams are notable in this regard because their composition by very common compounds, such as aluminum oxide, makes them completely harmless, unlike asbestos and other ceramic fibers. Their high strength and hardness also allows them to be used as structural materials for low stress applications.

=== Electronics ===
With easily controlled porosities and microstructures, ceramic foams have seen growing use in evolving electronics applications. These applications include electrodes, and scaffolds for solid oxide fuel cells and batteries. Foams can also be used as cooling components for electronics by separating a pumped coolant from the circuits themselves. For this application, silica, aluminum oxide, and aluminum borosilicate fibers can be used.

=== Pollution Control ===
Ceramic foams have been proposed as a means of pollutant control, particularly for particulate matter from engines. They are effective because the voids can capture particulates as well as support a catalyst that can induce oxidation of the captured particulates. Due to the easy means of deposition of other materials within ceramic foams, these oxidation-inducing catalysts can easily be distributed through the entire foam, increasing effectiveness.

=== Filtering ===
Ceramic foam filters (CFF) are used for the filtration of liquid metal. Passing liquid metal through the ceramic foam filter reduces impurities, including nonmetallic inclusions, in the liquid metal and the corresponding finished product (casting, sheet, billet, etc). It has found success in its application and use in continuous casting (sheet), semi-continuous casting (billet and slab), and casting gating systems in metal foundries.

=== Wastewater Treatment ===
Due to the foam's unique pore structure and large specific surface area, it sees a use as a filter for wastewater. The filtration process is a combination of adsorption, surface filtration, and deep filtration with deep filtration providing a majority of the filtration process.

=== Construction ===
Close-cell ceramic foam serves as a good insulation material for walls and roofs. The large number of closed cells allow the material to be resistant to corrosion and absorb sound internally and externally. Buildings in China have utilized ceramic foam as a thermal insulation material.

=== Noise reduction ===
Foam ceramics has its use in sound absorption in wet and oily environments. The sound waves vibrate in the pores of the foam and transform the energy into heat through friction and air resistance, thus reducing echos in the environment.

=== Automobile ===
Due to the three-dimensional connected mesh structure, high temperature resistance, and thermal stability of ceramic foam, its use in catalytic converters in exhaust systems help remove oxides and other particulate matter from exhaust gasses.

=== Biomaterial ===
Current research sees ceramic foams often formulated with Bioglass to create tissue scaffolds for bone repair. Their porous characteristic shows promise in load-bearing bone tissue engineering applications. The bioglass allows the material to be bioactive and form hyaluronic acid on the surface of the material as biological fluid contacts with glass-ceramic foam. Glass-ceramic shows promise as its properties of having adequate porosity to allow cells to migrate through the scaffold, high mechanical strength to bear load, and good bioactivity to allow cells to flourish.
