= Foam glass =

Porous glass foam material used as a building material

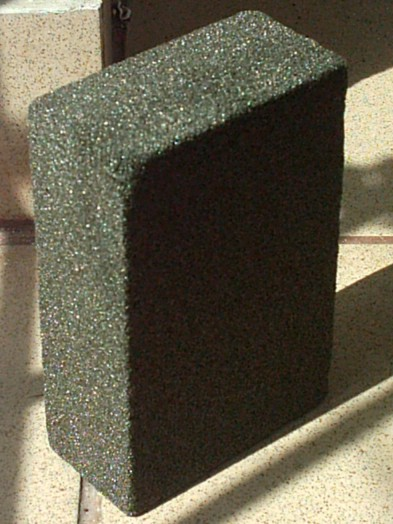
Block of foam glass

Foam glass or expanded glass is a porous glass foam material. It is used as a lightweight, moisture- and fireproof building material with thermal and acoustic insulating properties.

It is made by heating a mixture of crushed or granulated glass and a blowing agent (chemical foaming agent), often carbon or carbonates such as limestone. Near the melting point of the glass, the blowing agent releases a gas, producing a foaming effect in the glass. After cooling the mixture hardens into a rigid material with gas-filled closed-cell pores comprising a large portion of its volume. Foam glass gravel is produced by letting the glass mass fracture during the cooling process. Often recycled glass, sometimes from disused CRTs, is used as a base material. Igneous rock such as obsidian and industrial waste slag may also be used.

While the term porous glass often indicates glass with pores in the nanometre- or micrometre-range the pore size of foam glass is usually within 0.5 to 5 mm, and the pores make up 80%~90% of the total volume.

Chemical foaming agents facilitate the release of the gaseous phase upon heat treatment. In general, these additives are either a) redox and neutralization agents, or b) decomposing agents. Redox and neutralization agents include nonoxide materials, e.g. carbides or nitrides. Decomposing agents include sulfates, e.g. CaSO_{4}•nH_{2}O, organic compounds, and carbonates, e.g. CaCO_{3}. These materials release gas following decomposition and/or burning.

Expanded glass is widely used in the building industry and for other industrial insulation applications as well as a filler in composite materials.

== Properties ==
Foam glass is fireproof, waterproof, non-toxic, corrosion-resistant, non-aging, non-radioactive, and insulating. It is a stable building exterior wall and roof insulation and sound insulation material.

Foam glass does not absorb water. The cells are mostly closed, so there is no capillary rise.

Foam glass has an operating temperature range of -200 to 450 °C and a small expansion coefficient (8 × 10 °C).

Foam glass with open pores absorbs sound and is used as a sound insulation material. Penetration loss can be around 28.3 dB in 60~400 Hz.

Depending on the properties of the foam glass, it can be used as insulation material in various sectors of construction engineering, as well as in shipbuilding, chemical, cryogenic, and high-temperature technologies. As a moisture-proof, fireproof, and chemically resistant material foam glass may be used in harsh environments such as in heat insulation and deep cooling in underground and open-air applications such as pipelines and tank foundations.

== Application ==
Expanded glass is mostly used as a insulation material, e.g. in machine room noise reduction and highway sound absorption barrier. Recently, it has become available in monolithic dimensions of 2.8 x 1.2m.

Foam glass insulation aggregate (foam glass gravel) is used in a similar way as porous clay aggregate as a load-bearing hardcore. With a lambda/k value of around 0.08 W/(mK) its thermal conductivity is approximately 20% lower than lightweight expanded clay aggregate.

Depending on the application, foam glass products produced by the corresponding processes can be divided into four categories, namely insulating foam glass, sound-absorbing decorative foam glass, facing foam glass, and granular foam glass.

White and stained glass are also used as sound absorbing and decorative materials. Waste in production – foamed glass powder and scrap can also be used as fillers for decorative light concrete and other applications.

== History ==
In the 1930s, Saint-Gobain of France first developed foam glass with calcium carbonate as a foaming agent. In 1932, it applied for a patent.

An early report of foam glass as a construction material was made by the Soviet scientist, Professor Isaak Ilych Kitaygorodskiy (ru) at the All-Union Conference on Standardization and Manufacture of New Construction Materials in Moscow in 1932. Subsequently, in 1939, the Soviet Union reports experimentally produced foam glass at the intermediate pilot plant of the Mendeleev Institute of Chemical Technology. A glass powder screened through a 0.09 mm mesh was mixed with limestone and later on with anthracite and coal as gasifier.

The product that is known today as Foamglas cellular glass insulation, was developed by Pittsburgh Corning and was later acquired by Owens Corning. It is made of cullet, foaming agent, modified additive and foaming accelerator. After fine pulverization and uniform mixing, it is melted at high temperature, foamed and annealed. An inorganic non-metallic glass material, it consists of a large number of uniform bubble structures with a diameter of 1 to 2 mm. Sound-absorbing Foamglas insulation is more than 50% open cell bubbles, and heat-insulating Foamglas is more than 75% closed-cell air bubbles, which can be adjusted according to the requirements of use through changes in production technical parameters. Similar products by other manufacturers are sold as 'cellular glass' or 'foam glass'.

== See also ==
- Nanofoam
- Metal foam
- Ceramic foam
- Porous medium
- Reticulated foam
