= 2023 Interstate 95 highway collapse =

Bridge destroyed on major US highway by tanker truck fire

Interstate 95 highway collapse
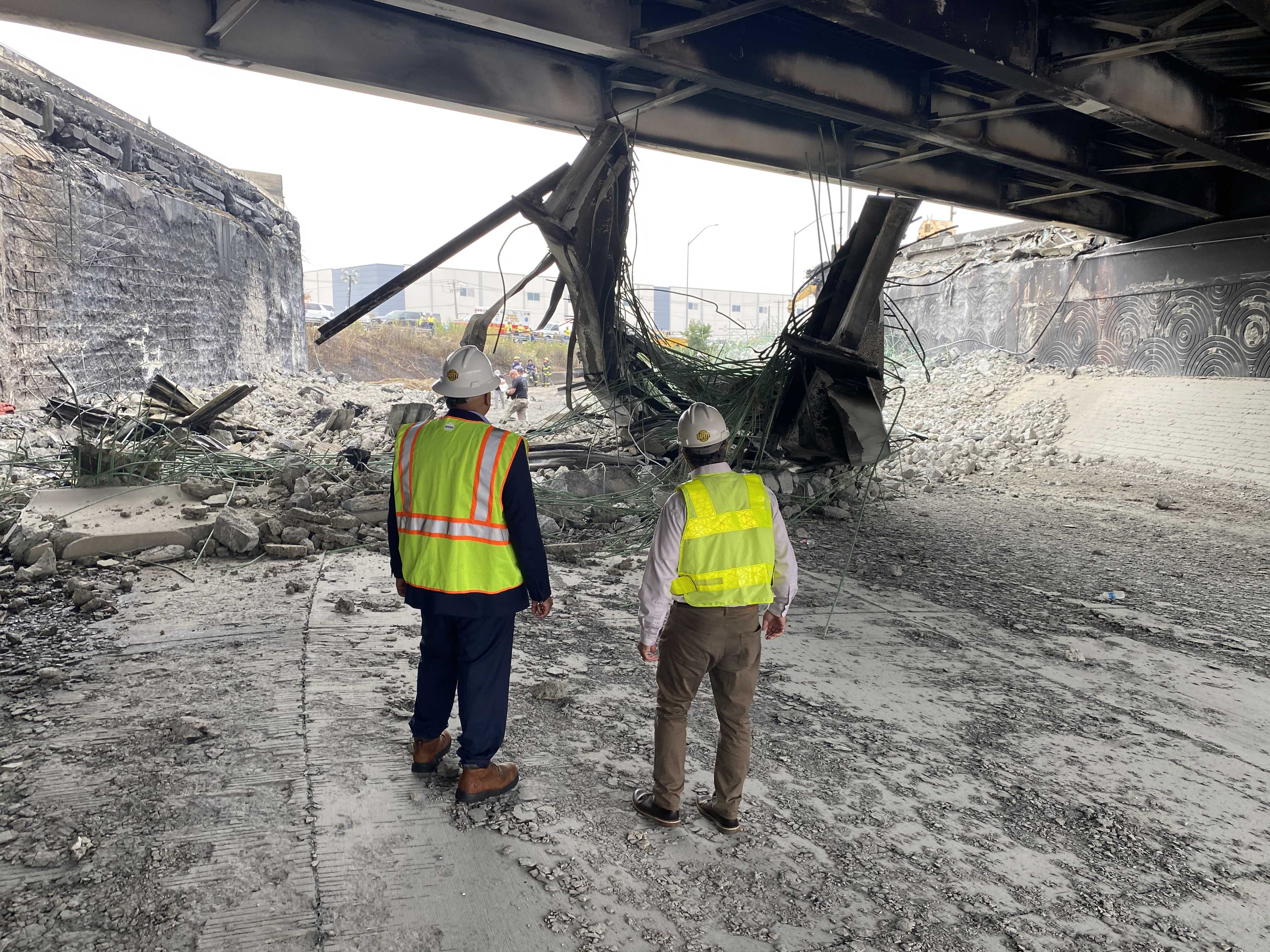
- Federal Highway Administration Administrator Shailen Bhatt inspects the collapsed overpass
- Date: June 11, 2023
- Time: 6:20 am (EDT)
- Location: Tacony, Philadelphia, Pennsylvania, US; 40°01′27″N 75°01′51″W
- Type: Bridge collapse
- Cause: Fire from gasoline truck crash
- Deaths: 1
- Injuries: 0

On June 11, 2023, a tanker truck carrying gasoline caught fire beneath the overpass that carries Interstate 95 (I-95) at the Pennsylvania Route 73 (PA 73, Cottman Avenue) interchange in the Tacony neighborhood of Northeast Philadelphia. The extreme heat caused the northbound lanes to collapse and damaged the southbound lanes, closing roughly nine miles (14 km) of both directions of I-95, between the Betsy Ross Bridge/Aramingo Avenue (exit 26) and PA 63/Woodhaven Road (exit 35). The swift construction of a temporary roadway enabled traffic to resume on June 23, less than two weeks after the fire.

The incident recalled the 2007 collapse of a connector in the MacArthur Maze in Oakland, California, the 2009 collapse of an I-75 overhead bridge in Detroit, Michigan, and the 2017 collapse of an I-85 overpass in Atlanta, Georgia.

== Background ==
The area affected by the crash carried about 160,000 vehicles daily. The highway span was 10 to 12 years old and had appeared structurally sound. It had also been part of a $212 million reconstruction project that had been finished about four years prior, according to a Transportation Department spokesperson. The 104-foot (32 m) span had recently been inspected and rated as being in "good" condition by PennDOT earlier in 2023, with another inspection scheduled for 2025.

== Fire ==
On June 11, 2023, a tanker truck carrying 8,500 US gallons (32,000 L; 7,100 imp gal) of 87-octane gasoline rolled over on an off-ramp while exiting Interstate 95 and exploded. Transportation Secretary Michael B. Carroll later stated that the driver had been attempting to navigate a northbound curve and lost control of the vehicle causing it to land on its side and rupture the tank. The emergency services were first alerted at 6:20 a.m. EDT, with local firefighters arriving around 10 minutes later, although there was initially some confusion about what exactly was on fire. The fire produced sufficient heat to weaken the supporting steel girders, causing part of the interstate to collapse about eight minutes before firefighters arrived. An hour later, the blaze was reported as under control.

Video footage of the accident and subsequent fire was posted online and determined to be from a camera at the warehouse of Baldor Specialty Foods, located near Milnor Street in Tacony. The video showed the truck leaving the highway and turning on its side while attempting to navigate a curve, before it was engulfed in a large fire. Other videos of the resulting fire were filmed by drivers, including one which seems to show the videographer's vehicle and others driving over a "dip" along the road as smoke billows out from underneath both sides of the highway.

== Victim ==
Initially, there were no reports of any injuries, but the following day, remains of the truck driver were found. He was identified as Nathan Moody, a 53-year-old father of three, who had died of blunt head trauma, smoke and fumes inhalation and thermal injuries per the Philadelphia Department of Health.

== Aftermath ==
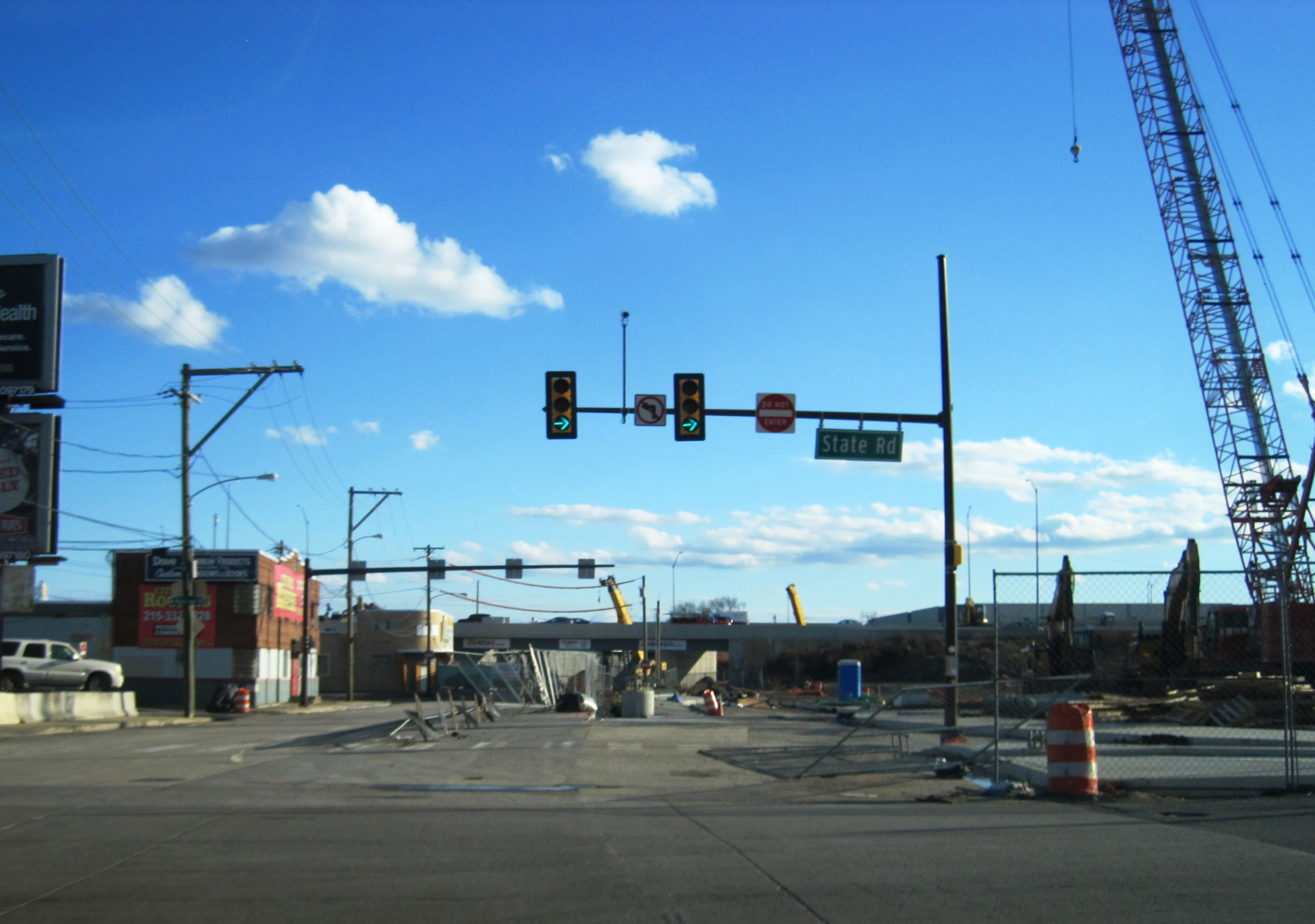
Construction to repair the collapsed section in 2024

Governor Josh Shapiro declared a state of emergency to secure federal funding to rebuild the bridge. Shapiro suggested that it would take months to rebuild the overpass and recommended that motorists consider public transport instead. Secretary of Transportation Pete Buttigieg said he would assist Shapiro and the United States Department of Transportation in recovery and reconstruction.

A full rebuild of the collapsed section of I-95, the primary north–south route along the East Coast that runs from Miami to the Canadian border in Maine, would have lasted several months. A plan was developed to create a temporary roadway to replace the collapsed bridge. Working 24 hours a day, seven days a week, workers filled the gap left by the collapsed and demolished bridge with lightweight backfill made of foam glass gravel. The completed temporary roadway allowed traffic to resume while a permanent replacement bridge was built. The fill was made from recycled glass bottles by Aero Aggregates in Delaware County. Its low density, 15% of normal fill, reduced load on the now-blocked roadway below and allowed delivery in fewer truck trips. A state-sponsored webcam live streamed the construction work at the site. The temporary roadway allowed six lanes of traffic to be open at all times while the permanent roadway was built. Demolition of the damaged bridge was completed on June 15, 2023, with work on the temporary roadway beginning immediately. I-95 reopened on June 23, 2023, with six lanes of traffic. Governor Shapiro, Philadelphia Mayor Jim Kenney, and PennDOT secretary Carroll attended a ceremony marking the reopening of the highway, with the mascots of Philadelphia's professional sports teams making the crossing.

On November 7, 2023, the permanent northbound lanes reopened, with the permanent southbound lanes reopening on November 9, 2023. Following that, the temporary roadway was replaced with a permanent bridge. The southbound lanes of I-95 fully reopened on May 23, 2024, while the northbound lanes of I-95 fully reopened on May 24, 2024, restoring eight lanes of traffic. The ramp from northbound I-95 to PA 73 also reopened on May 24, 2024.

=== Detours and alternatives ===
Traffic was detoured around the closure along I-676/US 30 (Vine Street Expressway), I-76 (Schuylkill Expressway), US 1 (Roosevelt Boulevard), and PA 63 (Woodhaven Road) in addition to a local detour using streets in Northeast Philadelphia. I-295 (Camden Freeway), US 130, and the New Jersey Turnpike were also used as alternate routes.

As a result of the closure, SEPTA added Regional Rail service to the Trenton Line, with three extra trains in each direction during rush hour, and added capacity to the West Trenton and Fox Chase lines. SEPTA implemented a substitute bus service along the Cynwyd Line. The Philadelphia Parking Authority allowed for free parking at three lots for commuters, with free parking also available at SEPTA Regional Rail stations and at the Frankford Transportation Center serving the Market–Frankford Line. SEPTA regional rail experienced a 16% increase in ridership during the I-95 shutdown. After a few days of severe rush hour delays, traffic had nearly returned to normal as drivers found alternate routes, switched to transit, or worked from home.

== Investigation ==
In the immediate aftermath of the collapse, highway officials could not determine the root cause of the fire. The incident was investigated by the National Transportation Safety Board (NTSB) along with other groups. They later determined that gasoline spilled out from an unsecured hatch on the top of the gasoline delivery tanker. The fire most likely originated when gasoline escaped from the open manhole as the trailer overturned and nearly 2,500 U.S. gallons (9,500 liters) of mixed gasoline and ethanol began to spill out from a section of the tank and ignite. The NTSB documents also included a two-page policy issued in 2022 by trucking firm Penn Tank Lines Inc. of Chester Springs, Pennsylvania, that mandated pre-trip inspections of tanker manhole covers by truck drivers. That policy described the manhole covers as devices that will form a seal in case of a vehicle rollover and noted an incident a year earlier in which a cover had been left unsecured, “allowing leakage and causing an environmental spill.”

In its final investigative report, the NTSB concluded that the "probable cause" of the accident was "the driver’s failure to slow the vehicle as he exited the interstate onto the exit ramp well above the posted advisory speed limit, due to inattention to the roadway potentially associated with fatigue." Based on a video analysis, the NTSB concluded that "the truck was traveling between 44 and 54 mph, which was well above the posted advisory speed limit of 25 mph."

== Reactions ==
The two-week reconstruction of the highway was considered uncharacteristically rapid, and commentators such as Matthew Yglesias took it as evidence that the generally slow pace of infrastructure construction in the United States is a deliberate policy choice that can be circumvented when desired. Josh Shapiro, state governor during the collapse, was widely praised for his efficiency in coordinating the bridge reconstruction effort.

The collapse prompted apocalyptic predictions of gridlock and nationwide supply chain disruptions that never materialized. Traffic delays mostly dissipated a few days after the closure, as the highway no longer induced demand for car travel. Comparisons were drawn to previous planned or unplanned highway closures in Atlanta, Minneapolis, and Los Angeles in which the predicted "carmageddon" never came to pass.

== See also ==
- List of bridge failures
- Interstate 85 bridge collapse – a similar incident in Atlanta, Georgia in 2017
