= New Jersey Route 90 =

State highway in New Jersey, US

Route 90

Route information
- Maintained by DRPA and NJDOT
- Length: 3.22 mi (5.18 km)
- Existed: 1965–present

Major junctions
- West end: Betsy Ross Bridge at the Pennsylvania state line
- US 130 in Pennsauken
- East end: Route 73 in Cinnaminson

Location
- Country: United States
- State: New Jersey
- Counties: Camden, Burlington

Highway system
- New Jersey State Highway Routes; Interstate; US; State; Scenic Byways
← Route 88	→ Route 91

Route 90 is a 3.22-mile-long (5.18 km) freeway in New Jersey in the United States (U.S.). The western terminus is at the Betsy Ross Bridge over the Delaware River in Pennsauken Township, Camden County, where the road continues into Philadelphia, Pennsylvania, as an unnumbered road that provides access to Interstate 95 (I-95). The eastern terminus is an interchange with Route 73 in Cinnaminson Township, Burlington County. It is a four- to six-lane highway its entire length, interchanging with U.S. Route 130 (US 130) and County Route 644 (CR 644).

Route 90 was first proposed in 1964 a year after plans were made to build the Betsy Ross Bridge and was legislated in 1965 to run from the bridge to Route 73. The portion of the route between the Betsy Ross Bridge and US 130 was opened in 1976 while the portion from US 130 to Route 73 opened in 1988. When first proposed, Route 90 was planned to extend farther south to Route 73 in Mount Laurel, intersecting I-295 and the New Jersey Turnpike. There were other proposals that would have taken the freeway farther south to a planned Route 38 freeway, a planned US 30 freeway in Berlin, and possibly the Atlantic City Expressway. However, financial and environmental obstacles prevented any southern extension of Route 90. Across the Delaware River in Philadelphia, a freeway which was to be called the Pulaski Expressway and be designated Pennsylvania Route 90 (PA 90) was to have run from I-95 northwest to Roosevelt Boulevard (US 1). This freeway was not built either due to opposition from residents and financial limitations.

== Route description ==
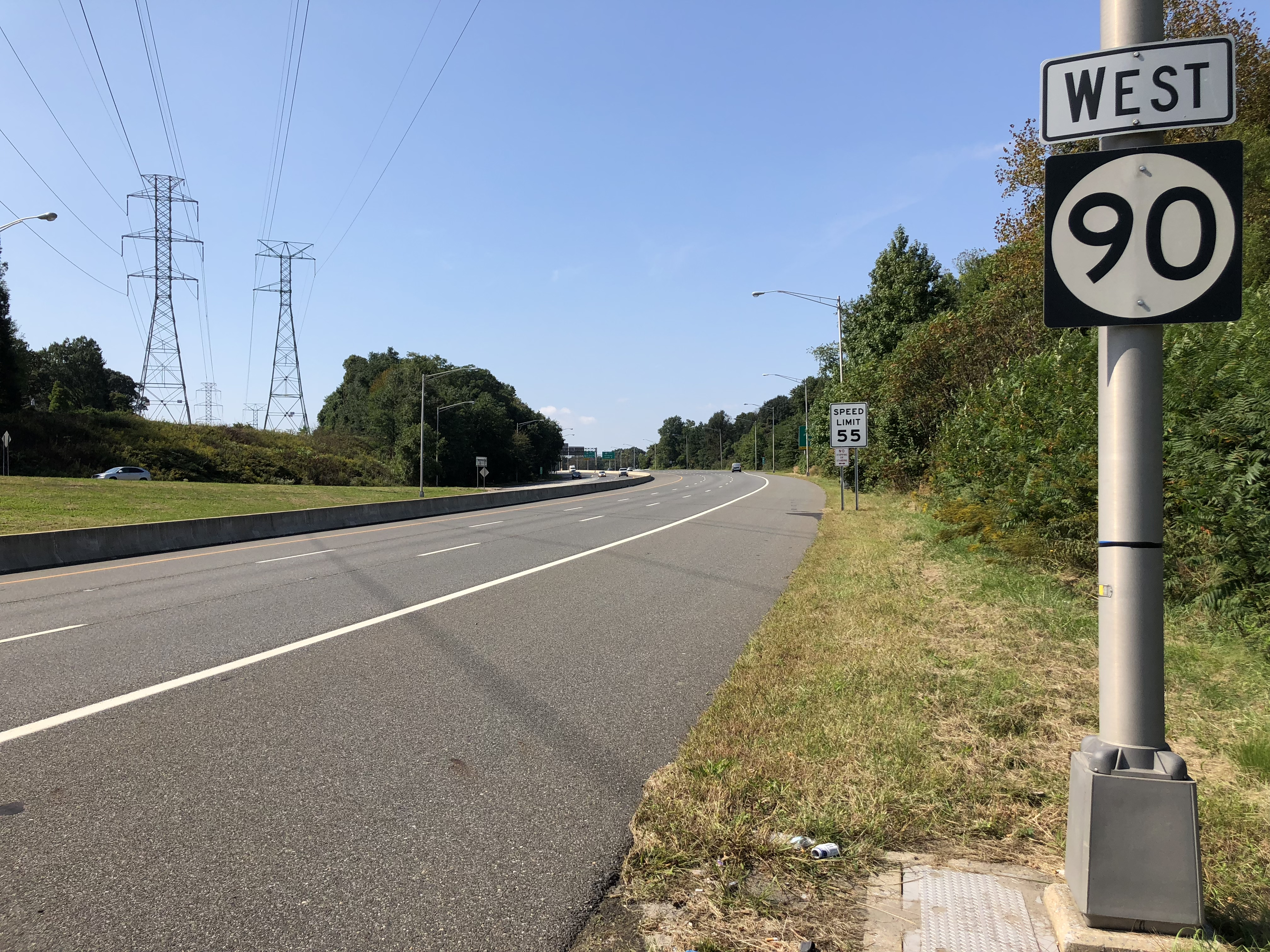
Route 90 westbound past the CR 644 interchange in Pennsauken Township

Route 90 begins at the Pennsylvania-New Jersey border on the Betsy Ross Bridge over the Delaware River, where the road continues into Philadelphia as an unnumbered freeway that heads to an interchange with I-95. Signs for the interchange along I-95 refer to New Jersey Route 90. From the Betsy Ross Bridge, Route 90 heads to the southeast into Pennsauken Township, Camden County as a six-lane freeway maintained by the Delaware River Port Authority, passing over residential areas as well as NJ Transit's River Line and CR 543 (River Road). The road reaches a toll plaza in the westbound direction. Route 90 passes over CR 615 (Union Avenue) before coming to an interchange with US 130, where maintenance is transferred to the New Jersey Department of Transportation. Shortly past the US 130 interchange, the freeway narrows to four lanes before coming to a partial interchange with CR 644 (Haddonfield Road), where there is a westbound on-ramp and an eastbound off-ramp. The route crosses into Cinnaminson Township, Burlington County and passes over the Pennsauken Creek. A short distance later, the Route 90 freeway merges into Route 73.

== History ==
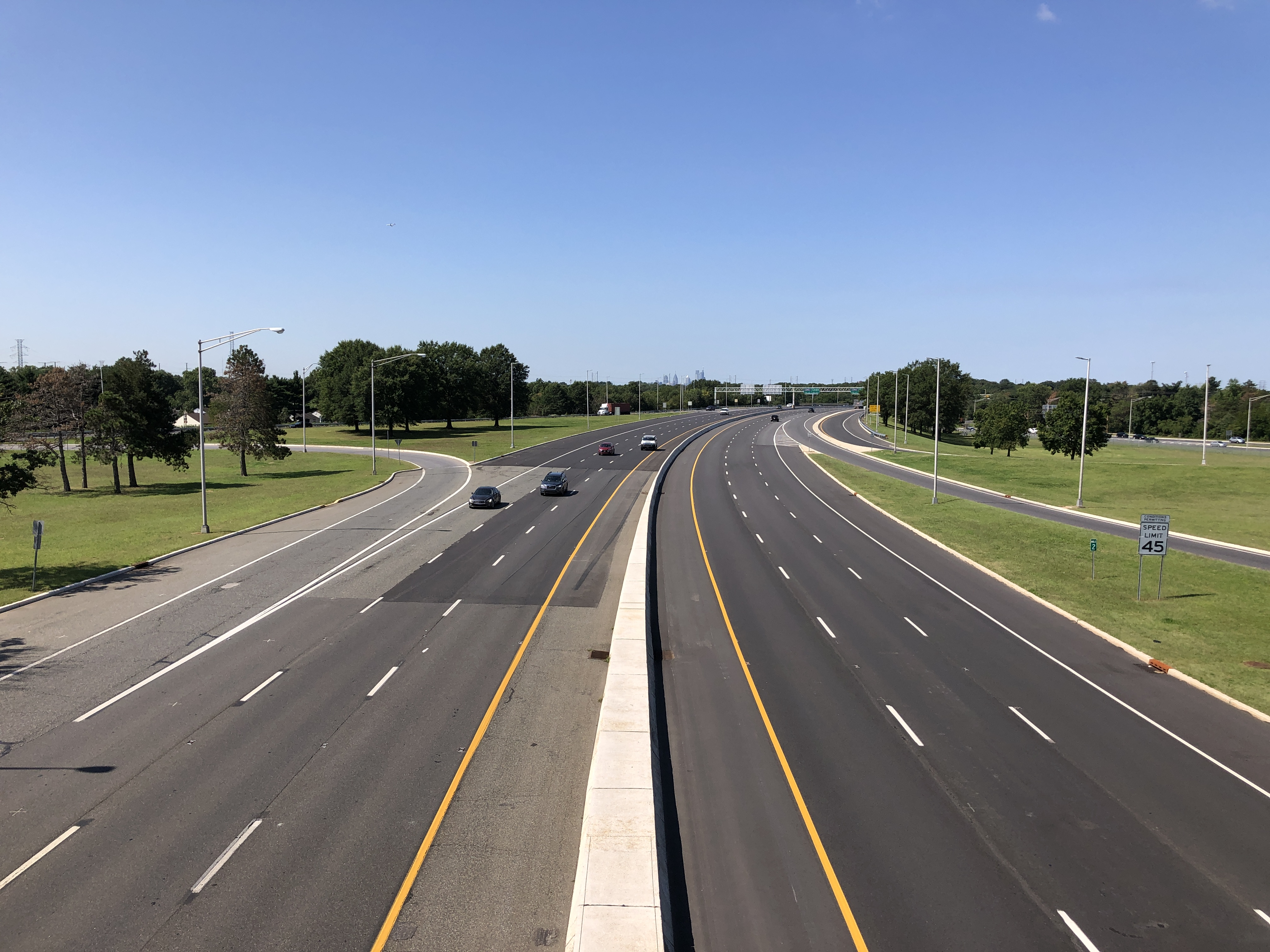
View westbound along Route 90 at the US 130 interchange in Pennsauken Township

Plans for the Route 90 freeway were first made in 1964, a year after the Betsy Ross Bridge over the Delaware River was proposed. In 1965, Route 90 was legislated to run from the proposed bridge in Pennsauken east to Route 73. In 1969, construction began on the Betsy Ross Bridge and its approach roads. A 1970 proposal to include the planned Route 90 freeway as a part of the Interstate Highway System was denied. The Betsy Ross Bridge itself was finished in 1974, but did not open to traffic until April 30, 1976 due to controversies concerning the approach roads. At this time, Route 90 was completed between the Betsy Ross Bridge and US 130. In March 1986, construction began on Route 90 between US 130 and Route 73 in Cinnaminson. This section of the route, which cost $23 million ($40 million today), was opened on October 25, 1988.

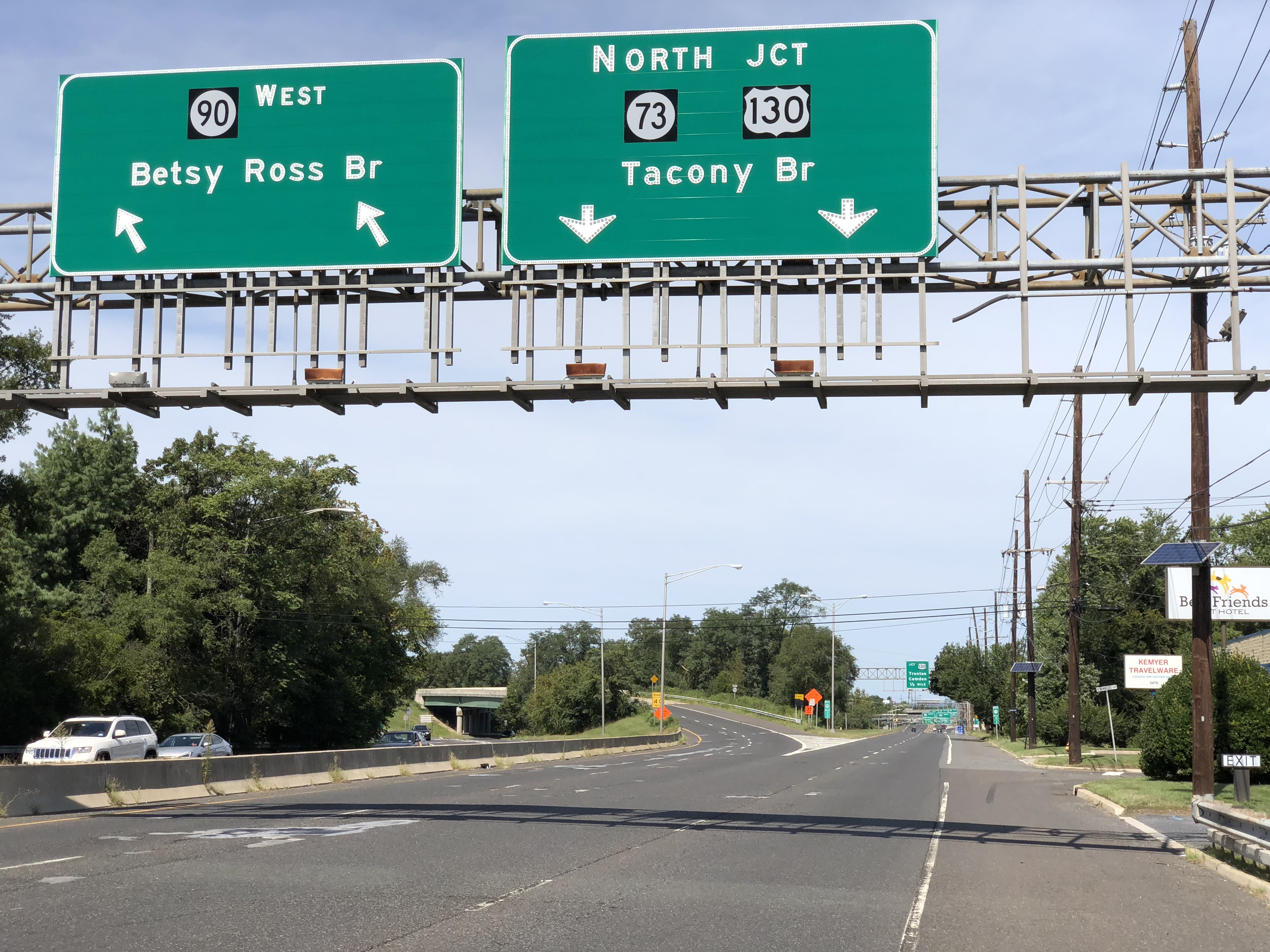
View west at the east end of Route 90 at Route 73 in Cinnaminson

Originally, Route 90 was intended to be a much longer freeway than it is today. When first proposed, it was to extend to I-295, the New Jersey Turnpike and Route 73 in Mount Laurel. There were two proposed routes of this freeway. The first proposal would have run south of Route 73 through built-up areas of Cherry Hill, Maple Shade, and Mount Laurel, along the South Branch of the Pennsauken Creek. Due to the route of this proposal, it was dropped in favor of a more northerly route that ran to the north of Route 73 through less developed areas. This freeway would have cost $42 million ($180 million today) and was to be completed in 1975. There were plans to extend the freeway further south than Route 73 in Mount Laurel. In 1966, a proposal was made for Route 90 to run south to a proposed Route 38 freeway that was to run from Camden to Monmouth County. Another proposal in 1969 called for a $14 million ($90 million today) extension of Route 90 south to a proposed US 30 freeway in Berlin and possibly the Atlantic City Expressway. Due to financial limitations and feared environmental impacts, the southern extension of Route 90 to Mount Laurel was canceled by 1980.

Across the Delaware River in Pennsylvania, there were plans of extending the freeway northwest from the I-95 interchange. This limited access highway, which was to be called the Pulaski Expressway and be designated PA 90, was to parallel the Frankford Creek and Tacony Creek and connect with Roosevelt Boulevard (US 1), which also was to be a limited access freeway. This proposed freeway, which was to cost from $125 to $150 million ($300 to $400 million today) and be completed in 1981, was canceled by 1980 due to community opposition and financial troubles. Vestiges of this extension can be seen from I-95 in the form of stub ramps and the mainline coming to an abrupt end as a barricaded bridge.

== Exit list ==
All exits are unnumbered.

County	Location	mi	km	Destinations	Notes
Delaware River		0.00	0.00	To I-95 – Central Philadelphia, New York	Western terminus; Pennsylvania state line
Delaware River		0.00	0.00	Betsy Ross Bridge (westbound toll; cash or E-ZPass)	
Camden	Pennsauken Township	1.67	2.69	John Tipton Boulevard / Suckle Highway / Hylton Road	Eastbound exit only
Camden	Pennsauken Township	1.67	2.69	US 130 – Cinnaminson, Pennsauken, Camden	No westbound access to US 130 north; last westbound exit before toll
Camden	Pennsauken Township	2.68	4.31	CR 644 south – Cherry Hill, Haddonfield	Eastbound exit and westbound entrance
Burlington	Cinnaminson Township	3.22	5.18	Route 73 south to I-295 / N.J. Turnpike – Maple Shade	Eastern terminus
1.000 mi = 1.609 km; 1.000 km = 0.621 mi: Incomplete access; Tolled
