= Pulaski Expressway =

Proposed but unconstructed highway in Pennsylvania, United States

Pennsylvania Route 90
- Pulaski Expressway

Route information
- Maintained by PennDOT
- Existed: 1947–1980 (never built)

Major junctions
- South end: Route 90 at Betsy Ross Bridge in Philadelphia
- I-95 in Philadelphia
- North end: US 1 in Philadelphia

Location
- Country: United States
- State: Pennsylvania

Highway system
- Pennsylvania State Route System; Interstate; US; State; Scenic; Legislative
← I-90	→ PA 91

The Pulaski Expressway (or alternatively the Tacony Expressway or Tacony Creek Parkway) was a proposed expressway to have been given the designation Pennsylvania Route 90. It was proposed by the Regional Planning Federation (the predecessor agency to the Delaware Valley Regional Planning Commission) around 1932 to have been a parkway built similar to Moses parkways in New York City. The highway was to have been routed through Northeast Philadelphia and was to have been divided into three sections.

== Route description ==
The Pulaski Expressway was to begin at an interchange with I-95 and the Betsy Ross Bridge in Northeast Philadelphia, where the road continues into New Jersey as Route 90. The freeway was to continue north through residential and industrial areas before passing through Tacony Creek Park. The Pulaski Expressway would continue north to its terminus at an interchange with US 1 (Roosevelt Boulevard).

== History ==
In 1932, the Regional Planning Federation (the predecessor agency to the Delaware Valley Regional Planning Commission) proposed the Tacony Creek Parkway to run along the Tacony Creek; however, this was never built. In 1947, the Philadelphia City Planning Commission proposed the Tacony Expressway through Northeast Philadelphia, which was to run from the Delaware Expressway northwest to PA 309 (former US 309, Fort Washington Expressway) at the border of Philadelphia and Montgomery County, interchanging with US 1 (Roosevelt Boulevard). Construction of the Delair Bridge (Betsy Ross Bridge) across the Delaware River was approved in 1964, with the Tacony Expressway planned to connect to the new bridge. In 1966, the routing of the Tacony Expressway was modified to follow Adams Avenue instead of passing through Tacony Creek Park. At the time, the freeway was to cost $56 million and be completed in 1971.

The Tacony Expressway was renamed to the Pulaski Expressway in 1969. In 1971, a route farther from Adams Avenue was selected to avoid displacing residents and businesses. The routing had several alternatives including aligning with Adams Avenue (cutting through cemeteries or avoiding them), go through Tacony Creek Park, using the Reading Railroad spur east of Adams Avenue, or cutting through Simpson Memorial Park. At this time, the Pulaski Expressway north of US 1 was canceled. During the 1970s, opposition grew toward the construction of the Pulaski Expressway. In 1975, the first two houses were demolished for the new freeway, and a group called United Communities Against the Pulaski Expressway erected a monument at the site that attacked Governor Milton Shapp and PennDOT. In 1976, the Betsy Ross Bridge opened to traffic, with ramps to connect to the Pulaski Expressway. The Pulaski Expressway was canceled by 1980 due to community opposition and financial troubles. Vestiges of this extension could be seen from Interstate 95 in the form of stub ramps and the mainline coming to an abrupt end as a barricaded bridge.

The unfinished barricaded bridge stub was demolished to make way for the Aramingo Ave-Betsy Ross Bridge connection project around 2015-2016.
