= Interstate 85 bridge collapse =

Collapse of a major commuter bridge in Atlanta, Georgia

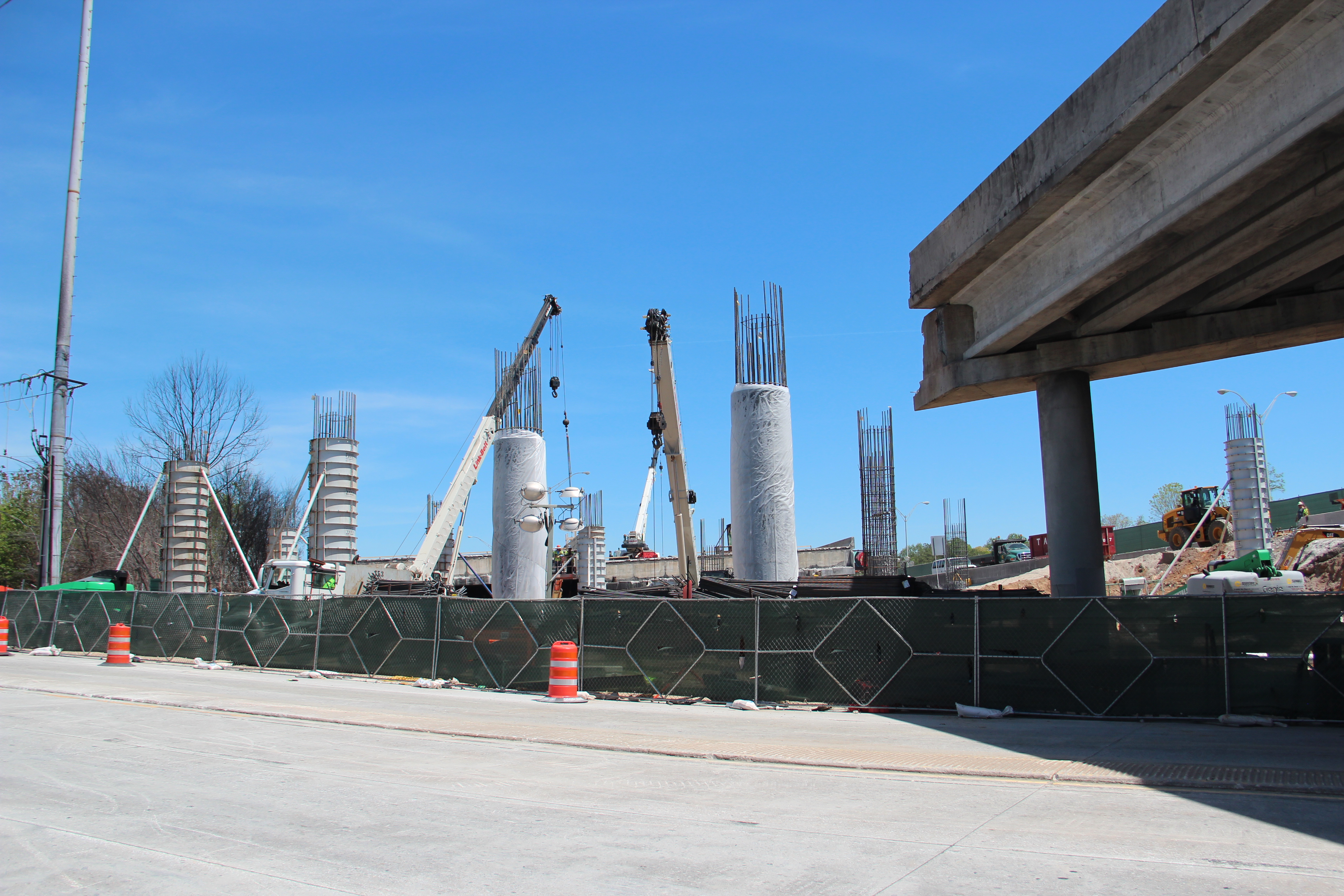
- Repair work being done at the collapse site on April 9, 2017
- Date: March 30, 2017; 9 years ago
- Time: c. 6:05 p.m. EDT
- Location: I-85 in Atlanta, Georgia, United States; 33.8136°N 84.3663°W
- Type: Bridge collapse
- Cause: Improper material storage, Arson (suspected)
- Property damage: Three sections of northbound I-85 and three sections of southbound I-85 were replaced

A massive fire collapsed an Interstate 85 (I-85) bridge in Atlanta, Georgia, United States, on the evening of March 30, 2017. After the 92-foot-long (28 m) section collapsed, I-85 was closed to traffic for 43 days between its split with I-75 and the interchange with State Route 400 (SR 400) — approximately two miles (3 km). Three sections of northbound I-85 and three sections of southbound I-85 were replaced at a cost of $15 million; re-opening of the interstate was on May 12.

Three individuals were arrested in connection with the fire, although the charges were later dropped. An NTSB report determined that the Georgia Department of Transportation contributed to the incident by unsafely storing materials under the bridge.

== Events ==
On March 30, 2017, a massive fire collapsed a section of the I-85 freeway viaduct in Atlanta, Georgia, stranding motorists for miles during rush hour traffic. The fire under the viaduct was allegedly "maliciously set" by a group of three individuals. The area of the collapse was over SR 237 (Piedmont Road) in the Piedmont Heights neighborhood north of Midtown Atlanta. Atlanta Mayor Kasim Reed described the situation as a "transportation crisis" and Georgia Governor Nathan Deal declared a state of emergency.

The fire started at approximately 6:05 p.m. under the highway bridge, at a state-owned storage area which contained high-density polyethylene (HDPE) and fiberglass tubing. The heat from the fire caused the collapse of a 92-foot (28 m) section of I-85 northbound at 7:14 p.m. Fire crews had the blaze under control by 8:00 p.m. No injuries were reported in the incident, and officials were credited with preventing casualties by stopping traffic and turning away onlookers.

== Repairs and detours ==
GDOT officials announced on April 4, 2017, that repairs could be completed by mid-June 2017. Traffic was diverted to I-75, I-285, and SR 400. In an effort to speed completion, up to $3 million in incentive payments were authorized for the contractor, C.W. Matthews Contracting Company, which completed work by May 12, when northbound lanes of the bridge reopened. In August 2017, a fence was built under the viaduct at the collapse site.

== Aftermath ==
The highway was closed for an extended period of time. Terrorism or foul play was not immediately suspected. It was thought that other sections of the bridge may have been compromised from the heat of the fire. Inspections of the bridge prior to the fire had revealed that the deck and superstructure were in good condition. Traffic data showed that both directions at a nearby point on I-85 carried nearly a quarter million vehicles a day in 2015.

The Metropolitan Atlanta Rapid Transit Authority (MARTA) announced an extension of service in response to the incident. MARTA general manager Keith Parker reported ridership spiked by 25% the day following the collapse. Three sections on the southbound side of the bridge, which did not collapse, also had to be replaced. The incident had a devastating effect on many area businesses, one of which reported a 90% decrease in traffic, seeing only three to four customers for the remainder of the day of the fire and the day following.

Two weeks after the bridge collapse, President Donald Trump met with first responders from the incident, commending them for preventing casualties. Trump agreed to send $10 million to Georgia to assist in cleanup and repair efforts.

== Arrests and prosecutions ==
On March 31, officials arrested and charged three individuals in connection with the incident. Basil Eleby was charged with criminal trespass and first-degree criminal damage to property for setting the fire, and two others were charged with criminal trespass for being present when the fire started. All three were believed to be homeless, though it was unclear whether they lived underneath the highway. The three were interrogated and taken to Fulton County jail, with the possibility of additional or upgraded charges as more evidence was developed. The charges against Eleby were later upgraded to first-degree arson, with his bail set at $200,000. An arrest affidavit indicated the three suspects went under the bridge to smoke crack. Eleby denied setting the fire, but one of the others arrested said he watched Eleby put a chair on top of a shopping cart near some fiber optic wire stored in PVC pipes, and set the chair on fire. Eleby appeared in court on August 14, 2017. Prosecutors agreed to drop the arson charges if Eleby completed an 18-month mental health and sobriety program, which he successfully completed on February 28, 2020.

== See also ==
- List of bridge failures
- 2023 Interstate 95 bridge collapse – a similar incident in 2023 in Philadelphia, Pennsylvania
