= Chaotic bubble =

Bubbles generated by nonlinear dynamic processes

Chaotic bubbles within physics and mathematics, occur in cases when there are any dynamic processes that generate bubbles that are nonlinear. Many exhibit mathematically chaotic patterns consistent with chaos theory. In most systems, they arise out of a forcing pressure that encounters some kind of resistance or shear factor, but the details vary depending on the particular context.

The most widely known example is bubbles in various forms of liquid. Although there may have been an earlier use of the term, it was used in 1987 specifically in connection with a model of the motion of a single bubble in a fluid subject to periodically driven pressure oscillations (Smereka, Birnir, and Banerjee, 1987). For an overview of models of single-bubble dynamics see Feng and Leal (1997). There is extensive literature on nonlinear analysis of the dynamics of bubbles in liquids, with important contributions from Werner Lauterborn (1976). Lauterborn and Cramer (1981) also applied chaos theory to acoustics, in which bubble dynamics play a crucial part. This includes analysis of chaotic dynamics in an acoustic cavitation bubble field in a liquid (Lauterborn, Holzfuss, and Bilio, 1994). The study of the role of shear stresses in non-Newtonian fluids has been done by Li, Mouline, Choplin, and Midoux (1997).

A somewhat related field, the study of controlling such chaotic bubble dynamics (control of chaos), converts them to periodic oscillations, and has an important application to gas–solids in fluidized bed reactors, also applicable to the ammoxidation of propylene to acrylonitrile (Kaart, Schouten, and van den Bleek, 1999). Sarnobat et al.) study the behavior of electrostatic fields on chaotic bubbling in attempt to control the chaos into a lower order periodicity.
