= Foam glass gravel =

Building material made from recycled glass

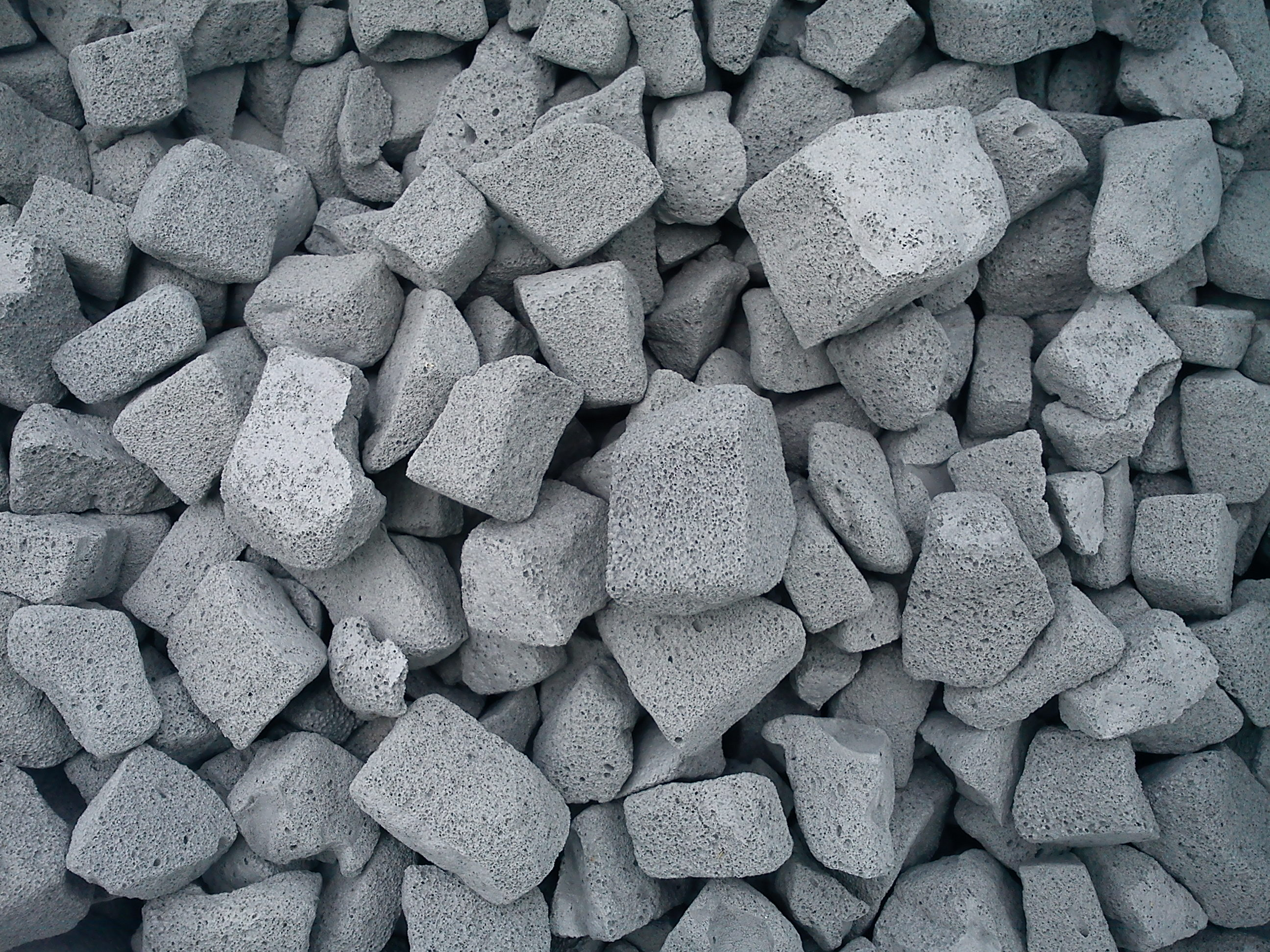
Foam glass gravel

Foam glass gravel is a building material made from recycled glass.

== Characteristics ==
Foam glass gravel is light and dimensionally stable, with a lambda rating of 0.08 W/mK and a specific weight of 150 kg per cubic metre. Being made from glass, the aggregate is non-combustive and inert, ageing resistant, pH neutral and insect and rodent resistant. The manufacturing process seals the air bubbles giving the gravel non-capillary properties. The material has a high compressive strength as well as insulatory properties making it ideal for insulated floor construction

== Sourcing and manufacture ==
Glass shards are cleaned and milled to a powder before a foaming agent, active carbon, is added in either liquid or solid form. The material is passed through a continuous tunnel furnace and heated to a temperature of 800–900 °C. Optimum temperatures produce maximum quantities of the foamed product. The foamed molten glass breaks into gravel on cooling.

== Uses ==
Foam glass gravel has a wide range of applications across construction and civil engineering projects as well as landscaping applications. It is used as the base aggregate in the construction of solid floors and as an insulating aggregate for baseplates. The gravel is self-interlocking with a high friction angle and is used in road construction, particularly useful in areas of marshy ground or permafrost marginal zones where it can reduce the degradation of the road base. It can be used to insulate underground tanks or pipes, create drainage beds and French drains.

== See also ==
- 2023 Interstate 95 highway collapse
