= Reticulated foam =

Porous, low-density solid foam

Reticulated foam is a very porous, low-density solid foam. 'Reticulated' means like a net. Reticulated foams are extremely open foams i.e. there are few, if any, intact bubbles or cell windows. In contrast, the foam formed by soap bubbles is composed solely of intact (fully enclosed) bubbles. In a reticulated foam only the lineal boundaries where the bubbles meet (Plateau borders) remain.

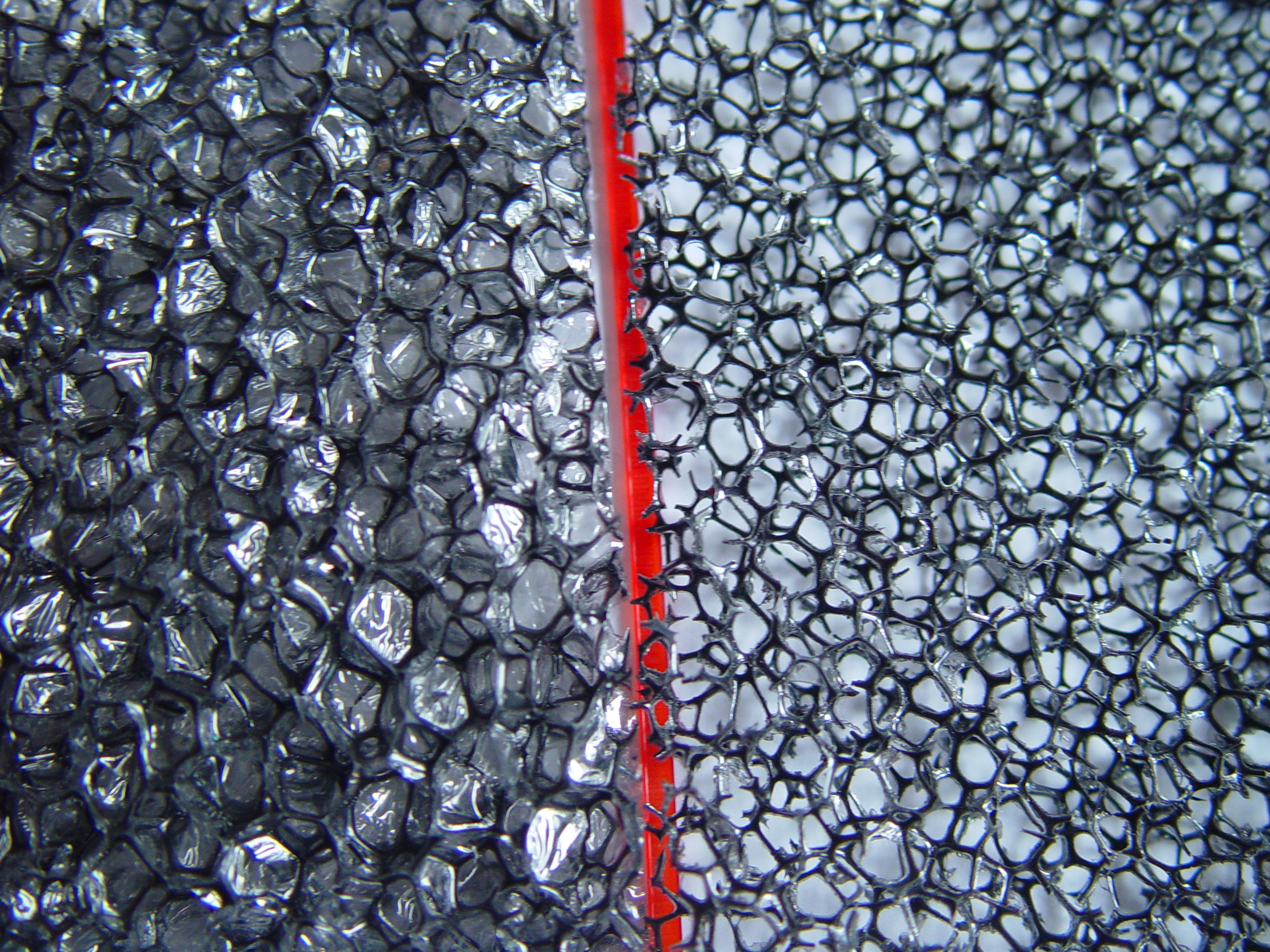
Foam before reticulation (left), after reticulation (right)

The solid component of a reticulated foam may be an organic polymer like polyurethane, a ceramic, or a metal. These materials are used in a wide range of applications where the high porosity and large surface area are needed, including filters, catalyst supports, fuel tank inserts, and loudspeaker covers.

== Structure and properties ==
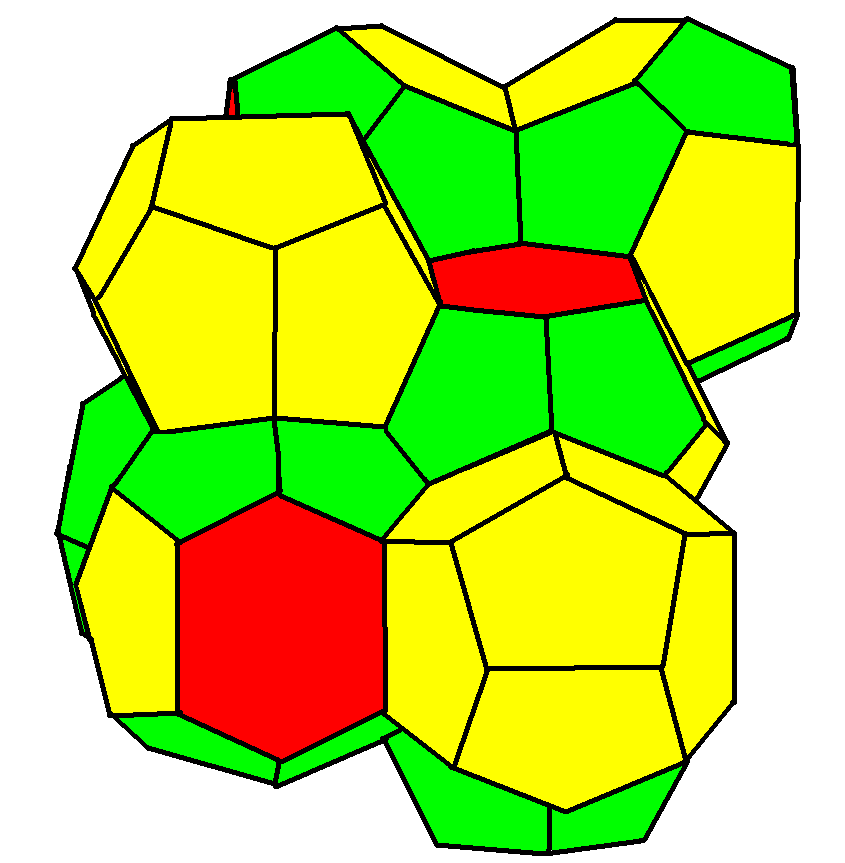
Weaire–Phelan structure

A description of the structure of reticulated foams is still being developed. While Plateau's laws, the rules governing the shape of soap films in foams were developed in the 19th century, a mathematical description of the structure is still debated. The computer-generated Weaire–Phelan structure is the most recent. In a reticulated foam only the edges of the polyhedra remain; the faces are missing. In commercial reticulated foam, up to 98% of the faces are removed. The dodecahedron is sometimes given as the basic unit for these foams, but the most representative shape is a polyhedron with 13 faces. Cell size and cell size distribution are critical parameters for most applications. Porosity is typically 95%, but can be as high as 98%. Reticulation affects many of the physical properties of a foam. Typically resistance to compression is decreased while tensile properties like elongation and resistance to tearing are increased.

== Production ==
Robert A. Volz is credited with discovering the first process for making reticulated polyurethane foam in 1956 while working for the Scott Paper Company. Production of reticulated polyurethane foam is a two-step process that begins with the creation of conventional (closed-cell) polyurethane foam, after which cell faces (or "windows") are removed. To do so, the fact that the higher surface area and lower mass of cell faces compared with cell struts (or edges) makes them much more susceptible to both combustion and chemical degradation is exploited. Thus, closed-cell foam is either filled with a combustible gas like hydrogen and ignited under controlled conditions, or it is exposed to a sodium hydroxide solution to chemically degrade the foam, which will remove cell windows whilst sparing the edges.

Reticulated ceramic foams are made by coating a reticulated polyurethane foam with an aqueous suspension of a ceramic powder then heating the material to first evaporate the water then fuse the ceramic particles and finally to burn off the organic polymer.

Reticulated metal foam can also be made using polyurethane foam as a template similar to its use in ceramic foams. Metals can be vapor deposited onto the polyurethane foam and then the organic polymer burned off.

== Applications ==
Reticulated foams are used where porosity, surface area, and low density are important.

- Puppets (such as the bodies/faces/hands of The Muppets)
- Humidifier pads
- Air conditioner filters
- Scrubbers
- Ceramic filters for filtering molten metal
- Vehicle and bacteria filters
- Speaker grills
- Face mask and pads
- Outdoor cushions
- Marine seating
- Shoe polish and cosmetic applicators
- Ink jet cartridges
- Aquaculture (water purification)
- Anti-slosh filling in fuel tanks for aircraft (such as the A-10 Thunderbolt II) and race cars
