= Betsy Ross Bridge =

Bridge connecting Philadelphia and New Jersey

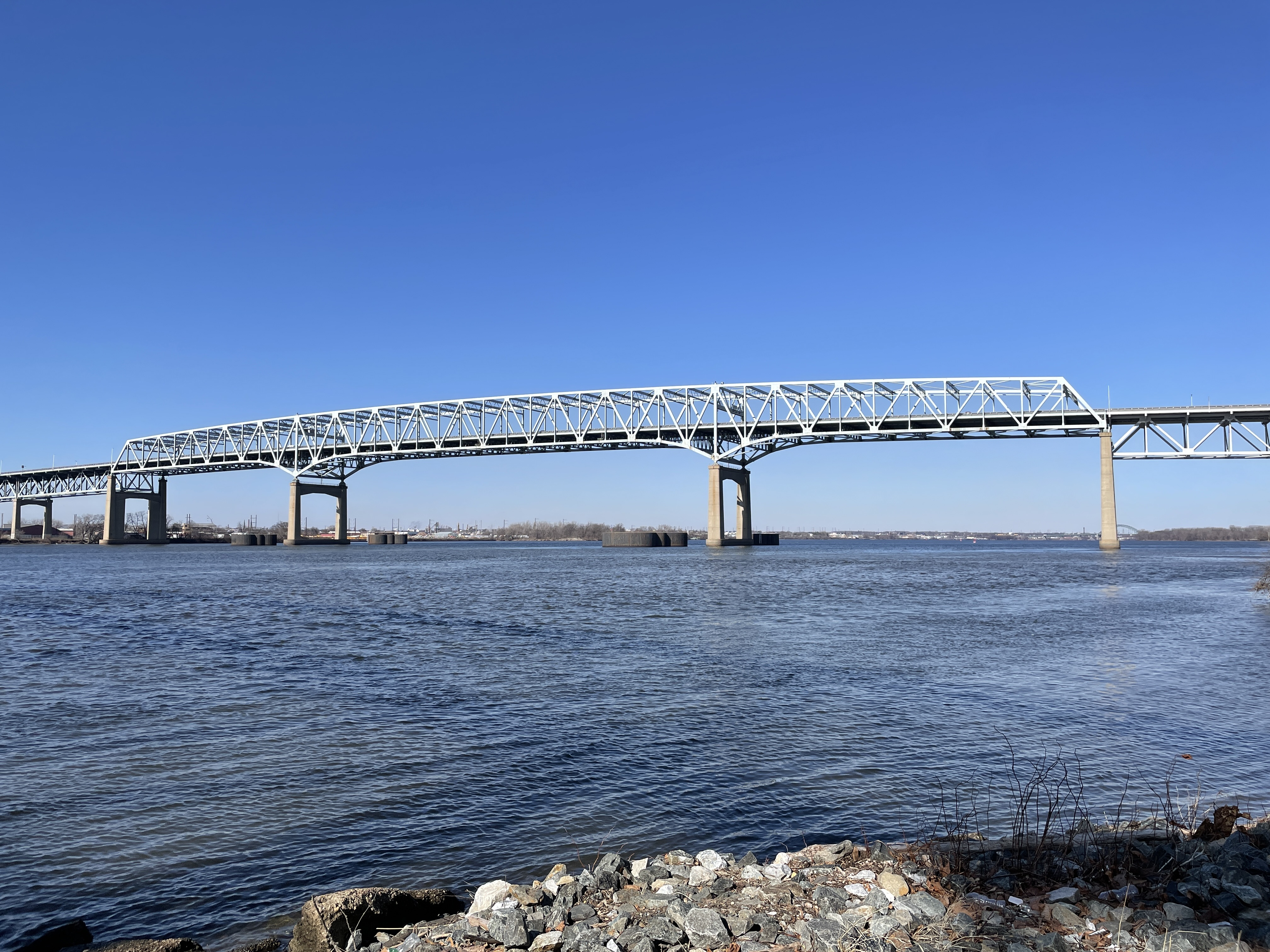
- Betsy Ross Bridge crossing the Delaware River in February 2023
- Coordinates: 39.98595°N 75.06676°W
- Carries: 6 lanes of Route 90 (NJ side)
- Crosses: Delaware River
- Locale: Philadelphia (Bridesburg), Pennsylvania and Pennsauken Township, New Jersey
- Official name: Betsy Ross Bridge
- Named for: Betsy Ross
- Maintained by: Delaware River Port Authority of Pennsylvania and New Jersey
- ID number: 4500011

Characteristics
- Design: Steel continuous truss bridge
- Total length: 8,485 feet (2,586 meters)
- Width: 105 feet 4 inches (32.11 meters)
- Longest span: 729 feet (222 meters)
- Clearance above: 37.66 feet (11.48 meters)
- Clearance below: 135 feet (41 meters)

History
- Construction cost: $103 million
- Opened: April 30, 1976 (50 years ago)

Statistics
- Daily traffic: 39,980 (2000)
- Toll: $6.00 (westbound) (E-ZPass)

Location
- Interactive map of Betsy Ross Bridge

The Betsy Ross Bridge is a continuous steel truss bridge spanning the Delaware River from Philadelphia, Pennsylvania to Pennsauken, New Jersey. It was built from 1969 to 1974, and opened in April 1976, during the American Bicentennial Year. It was originally planned to be named as the "Delair Bridge", after a paralleling vertical lift bridge owned by Pennsylvania Railroad, which is now used by Conrail Shared Assets Operations and New Jersey Transit's Atlantic City Line (both bridges NJ terminus are in the Pennsauken neighborhood of Delair), but was instead later named for Betsy Ross, a Philadelphia seamstress and reputed creator of the first American flag in 1776. It was the first automotive bridge named for a woman in the United States, and the second U.S. bridge overall named for a woman after Iowa's Boone High Bridge was renamed the Kate Shelley High Bridge in 1912.

Betsy Ross Bridge is located adjacent to the mouth of Frankford Creek. During construction, thousands of headstones from historic Monument Cemetery were used as riprap on the embankments built for the bridge, some of which can be seen along the edge of the Delaware River near the bridge during low tide.

== History ==
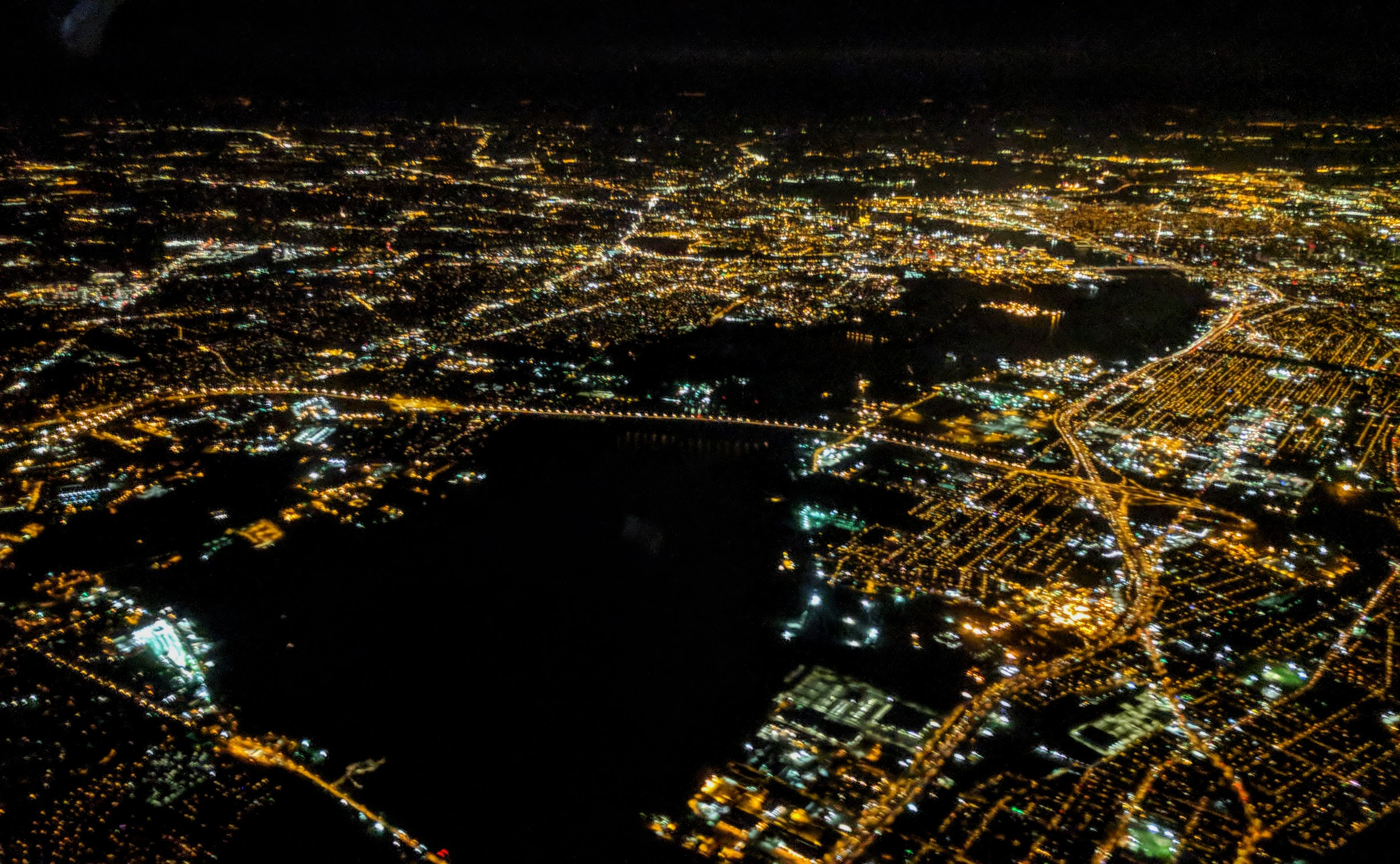
Aerial night view of three Delaware River crossings: the Betsy Ross Bridge crossing from Bridesburg to Pennsauken Township, New Jersey (right), the Tacony–Palmyra Bridge (lower left), and the Benjamin Franklin Bridge (upper right)

Construction began in 1969, and was completed in 1974. However, the bridge did not open to traffic until April 30, 1976 due to numerous problems with the communities where the bridge's ramps to and from Richmond Street were located. The problems, including traffic and especially heavy trucks, were also related to the highway route's planned extension to the northwest from the Delaware River, across Northeast Philadelphia to connect with the Roosevelt Expressway. The cancellation of this extension, the planned Pennsylvania Route 90, known as the Pulaski Expressway, resulted in the so-called "Evel Knievel" ghost ramps with unfinished bridges and flyover ramps, some of which were later constructed to serve nearby Aramingo Avenue in Philadelphia's Bridesburg section. The route serves as a high-level multi-lane with six lanes, separated by a concrete median barrier, bypassing the three-lane Tacony-Palmyra Bridge, which has a drawbridge on the span.

Construction in 1988 connected the bridge to New Jersey Route 90, allowing drivers to use Route 90 to access Route 73, rather than via U.S. Route 130.

In 1997, work to construct new ramps to the Pennsylvania side began. It was completed in 1999.

The bridge has a total length of 8,485 feet (2,586 m), and a main span of 729 feet (222 m). Though originally constructed with eight lanes, the bridge was reduced to six lanes with two shoulders in 2000, a median barrier was also placed on the deck. The bridge is owned and operated by the Delaware River Port Authority.

When approaching the exits from I-95 in Philadelphia for the bridge, drivers see signs referring to NJ Route 90. Beyond the toll plaza, which is on the New Jersey side, Route 90 continues as an expressway with maximum speed limit of 50 mph (80 km/h), and in a few miles ends with a merge onto southbound Route 73. The toll plaza (westbound tolls only) is 12 lanes wide, and since 2000 has been a participating E-ZPass facility.

== Tolls ==
A $6.00 one-way toll is charged entering Pennsylvania for passenger vehicles (7,000 lb (3,200 kg) or less gross vehicle weight). An $18 credit is given on a per tag basis for New Jersey-issued E-ZPass tags that crossed one of the four DRPA bridges 18 times in a calendar month. This discount had been suspended in 2010 but was since reinstated. Trucks, commercial vehicles, mobile homes, and recreational vehicles (weighing at least 7,000 lb (3,200 kg) gross vehicle weight) pay $9 cash per axle. Seniors aged 65 and over can use a discount program to pay $3.00 per trip with New Jersey E-ZPass.

On July 17, 2024, the DRPA approved an increase in the toll for passenger vehicles from $5.00 to $6.00, which went into effect on September 1, 2024.

== Plans ==
In 2011, the DRPA initiated the process of awarding an engineering contract to plan out the redecking of the bridge, as the concrete deck, its asphalt overlay, and the joints between the concrete have deteriorated after 35 years of service. Upon approval of the contract by the DRPA Board, the study is expected to take 30 months. No cost estimates or time frame for the actual redecking project have been announced.

With related improvements to Interstate 95 through Northeastern Philadelphia County, the Betsy Ross Bridge Interchange Project (exit 26) was initiated in March 2015 to replace the decking on the ramps on the Pennsylvania side of the bridge and complete the access ramps to Aramingo Avenue.

== Gallery ==
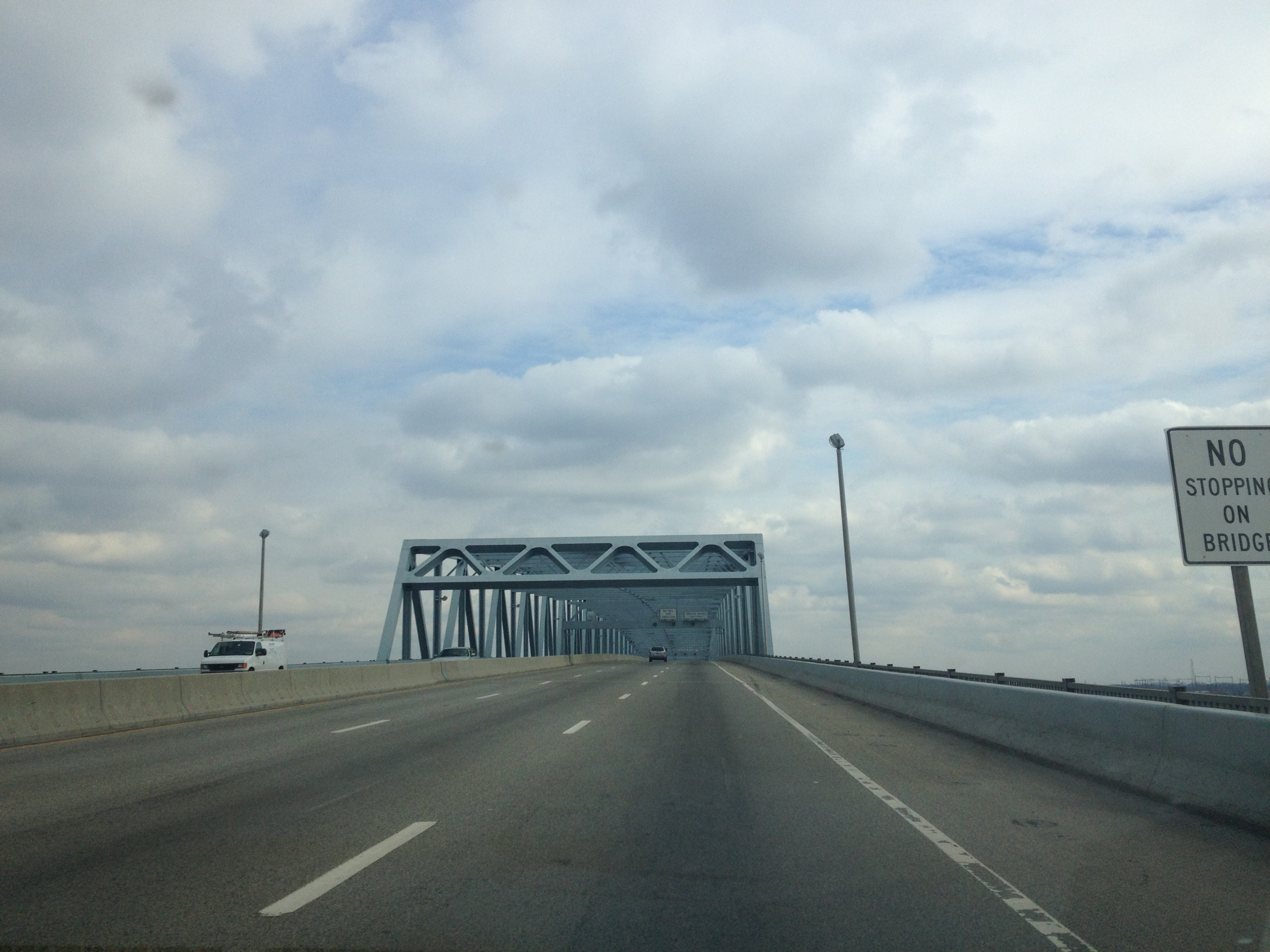
Eastbound across the Betsy Ross Bridge, from Philadelphia to Pennsauken, New Jersey across the Delaware River

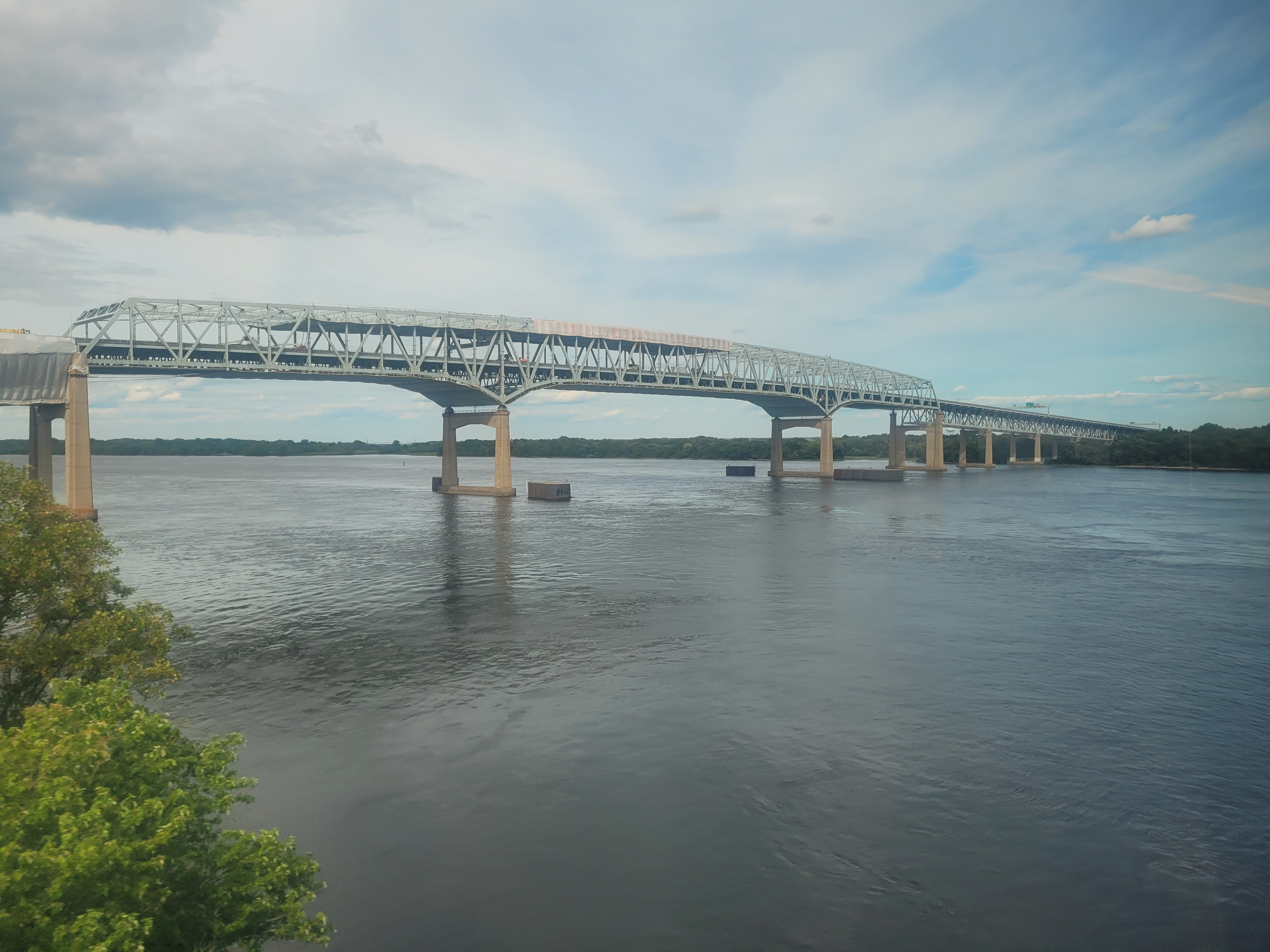
The Betsy Ross Bridge as seen from the Delair Bridge, July 2024

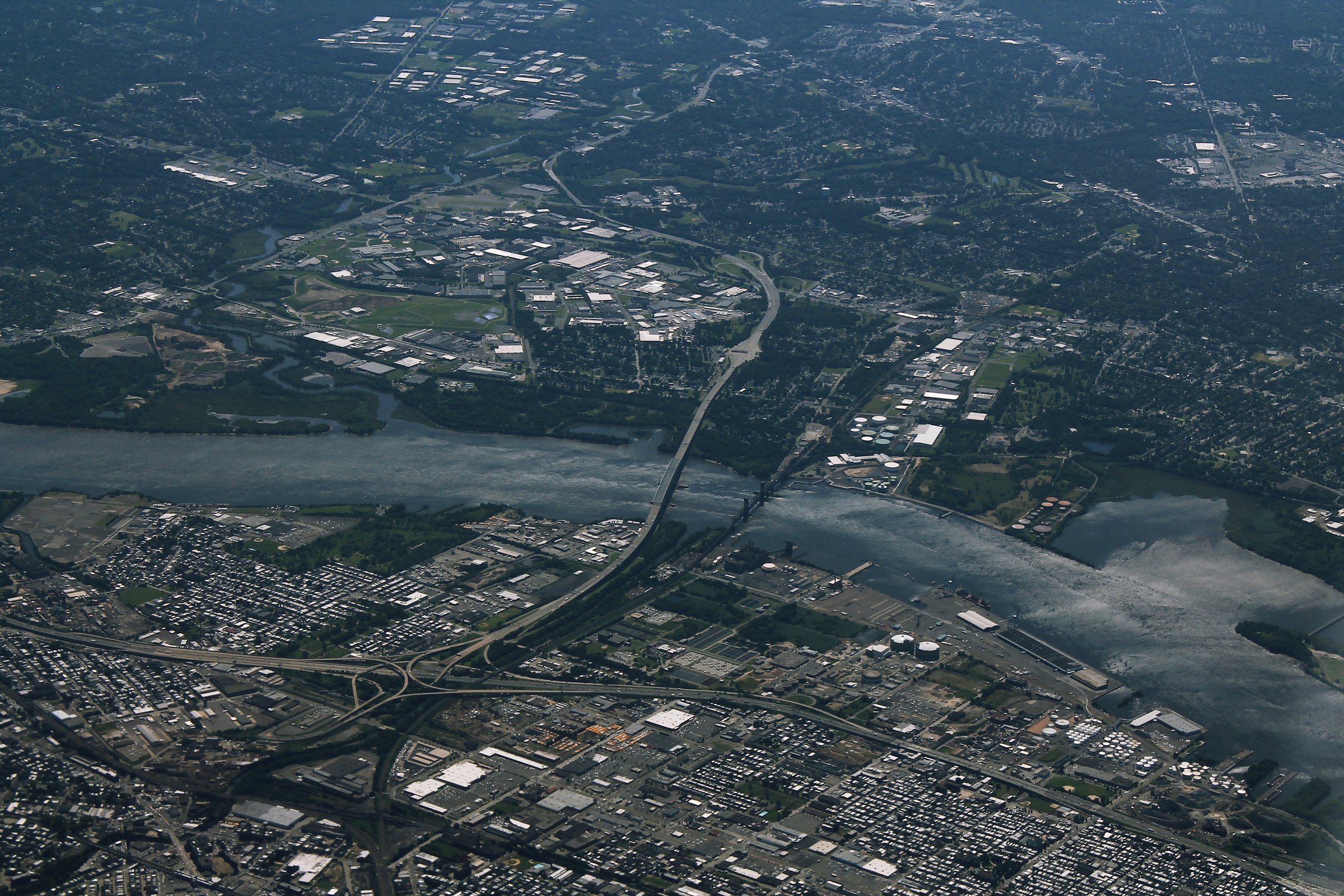
An aerial view of the Betsy Ross Bridge and Delair Bridge

== See also ==
- List of crossings of the Delaware River
