= Belmont Hall =

Belmont Hall may refer to:

- Belmont Hall (Newark, Delaware), listed on the National Register of Historic Places in New Castle County, Delaware, USA
- Belmont Hall (Smyrna, Delaware), listed on the NRHP in Delaware, USA
- Belmont Hall, Cheshire, grade-I-listed hall at Great Budworth, Cheshire, England
