= Poplar Hall =

Poplar Hall may refer to one of several houses listed in the National Register of Historic Places:

- John Dickinson House, generally known as Poplar Hall, listed in Kent County, Delaware
- Poplar Hall (Newark, Delaware), listed in New Castle County, Delaware
- Poplar Hall (Norfolk, Virginia), listed in Norfolk, Virginia
