= Andrew Kerr House =

Historic house in Delaware, United States

- U.S. National Register of Historic Places
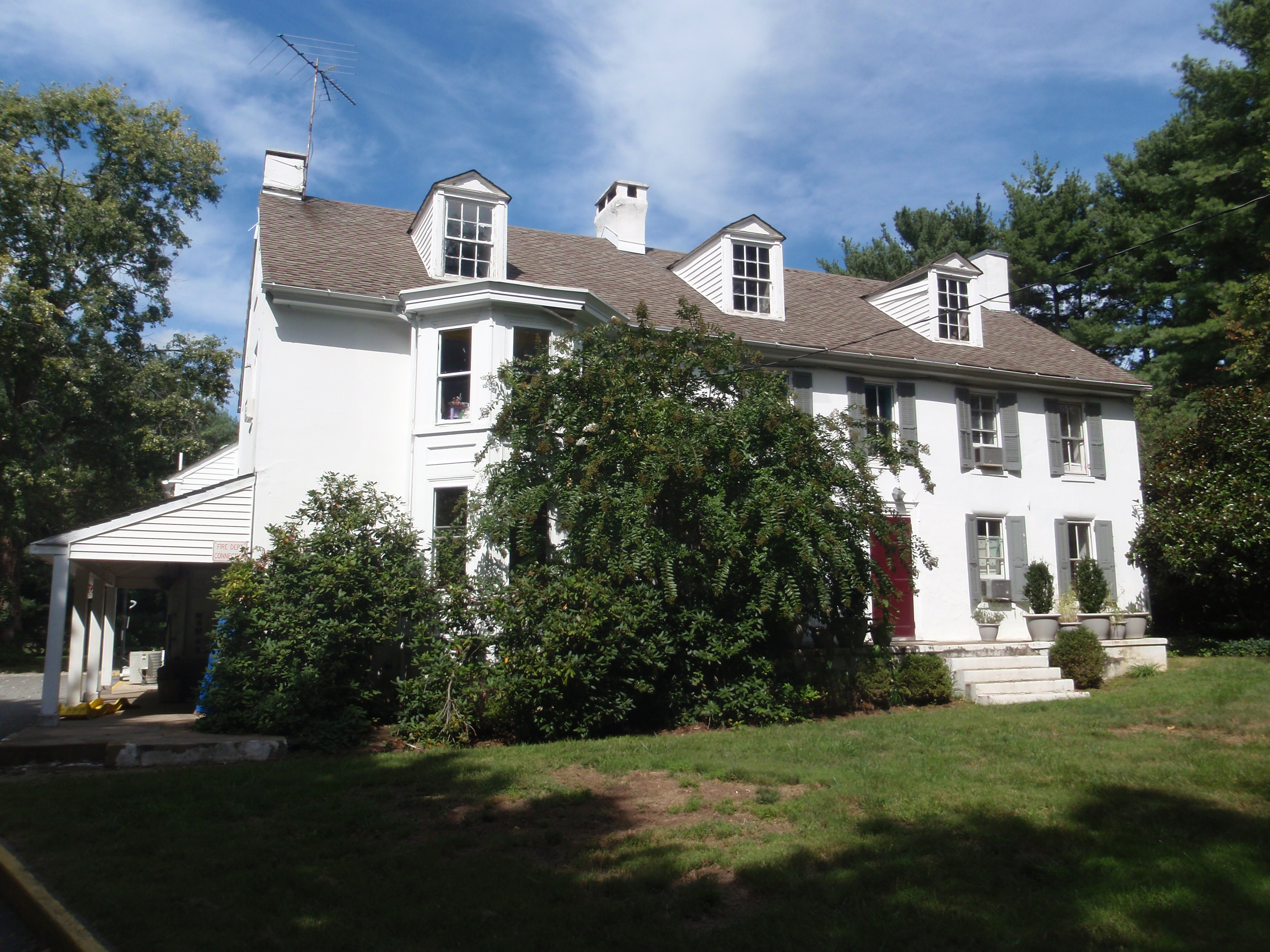
- Andrew Kerr House, September 2012

- Location within Delaware Location within the United States
- Location: 812 Elkton Rd., near Newark, Delaware
- Coordinates: 39.671209°N 75.770194°W
- Area: 1 acre (0.40 ha)
- Built: 1805
- MPS: White Clay Creek Hundred MRA
- NRHP reference No.: 83001342
- Added to NRHP: August 19, 1983

The Andrew Kerr House is a historic home located near Newark, New Castle County, Delaware. It was built in 1805, and is a two-story, gable-roofed, stuccoed stone structure. It has a two-story addition dated to the late-19th century. It features a polygonal bay window on its principal elevation. The Kerr family were prominent members of Head of Christiana United Presbyterian Church.

It was listed on the National Register of Historic Places in 1983.

== See also ==
- National Register of Historic Places listings in Newark, Delaware
