= Blue Hen Farm =

Historic house in Delaware, United States

- U.S. National Register of Historic Places
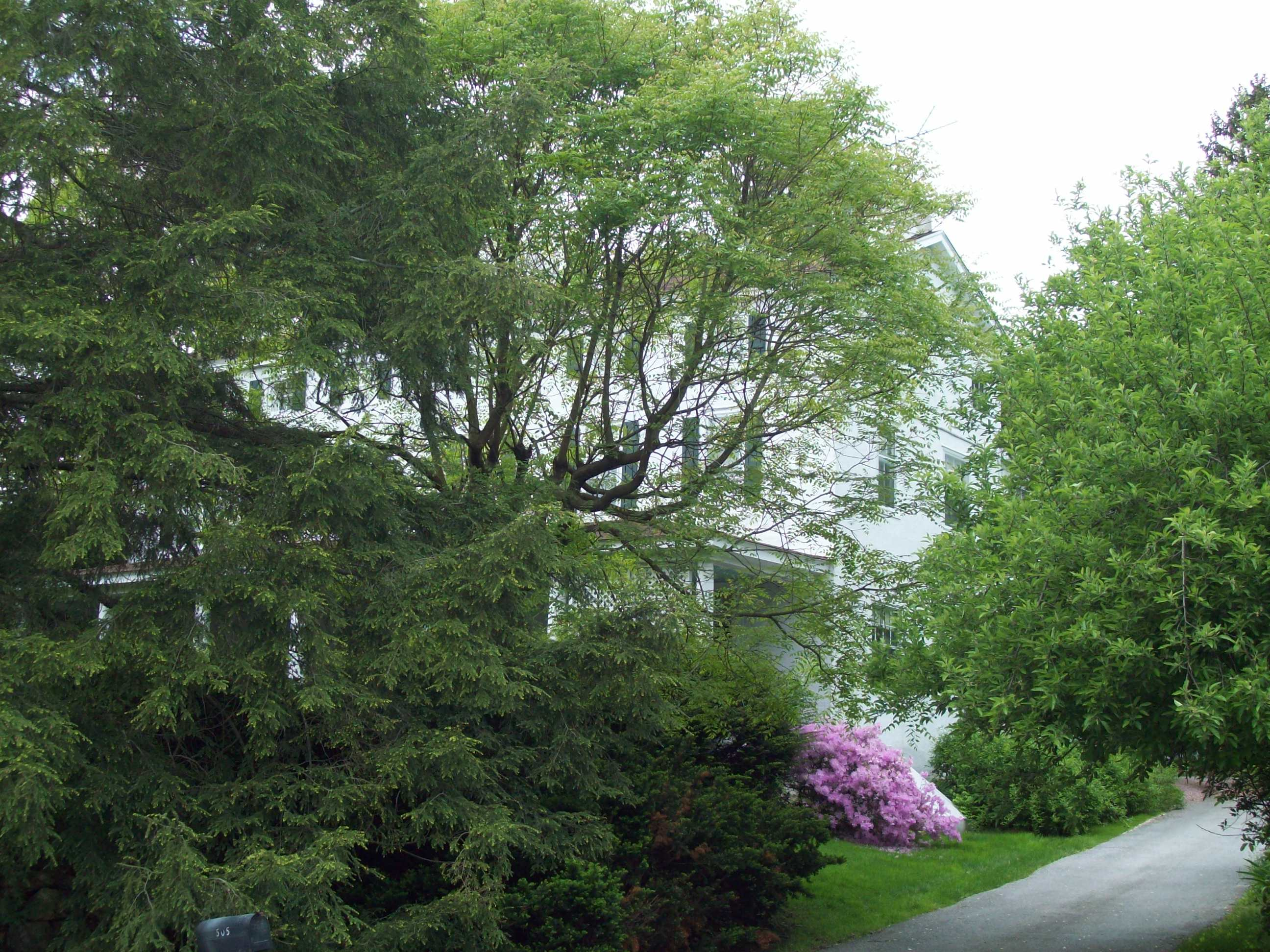
- Blue Hen Farm, April 2010

- Location within Delaware Location within the United States
- Location: 505 Stamford Dr., Newark, Delaware
- Coordinates: 39.695795°N 75.766449°W
- Area: 1 acre (0.40 ha)
- MPS: Newark MRA
- NRHP reference No.: 83001346
- Added to NRHP: February 24, 1983

Blue Hen Farm is a historic home located at Newark in New Castle County, Delaware. It is a stuccoed three story, six bay building built in four phases. The earliest part of the structure dates to the mid-19th century.

It was added to the National Register of Historic Places in 1983.

== See also ==
- National Register of Historic Places listings in Newark, Delaware
