= Baily House =

Historic house in Delaware, United States

- U.S. National Register of Historic Places
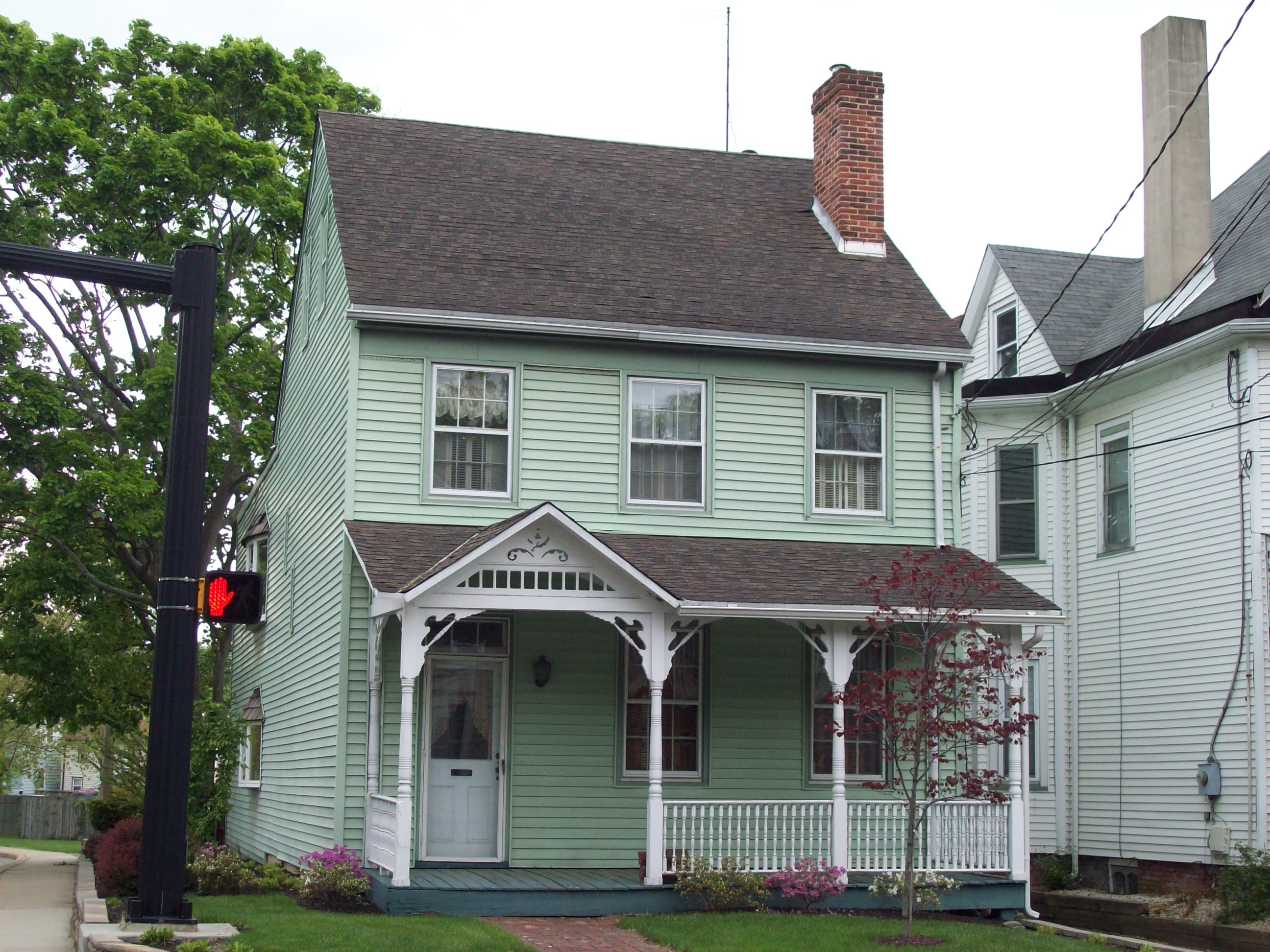
- Baily House, April 2010

- Location within Delaware Location within the United States
- Location: 166 W. Main St., Newark, Delaware
- Coordinates: 39.684181°N 75.758851°W
- Area: 0.2 acres (0.081 ha)
- Built: 1835
- Architectural style: Double-pile, side-hall Plan
- MPS: Newark MRA
- NRHP reference No.: 82002336
- Added to NRHP: May 7, 1982

Baily House is a historic home located at Newark in New Castle County, Delaware. It was built about 1835 and is a 2 1/2-story L-shaped frame dwelling with a three-bay front facade. It was probably constructed as a single-family dwelling that may have been formerly connected to a row of matching houses. Some believe that it was moved from Baltimore to Newark in the mid-19th century. It was the residence of Harriet Baily, who headed the Art Department of the University of Delaware from 1928 until 1956.

It was added to the National Register of Historic Places in 1982.

== See also ==
- National Register of Historic Places listings in Newark, Delaware
