= Building at 140 W. Main Street =

Historic house in Delaware, United States

- U.S. National Register of Historic Places
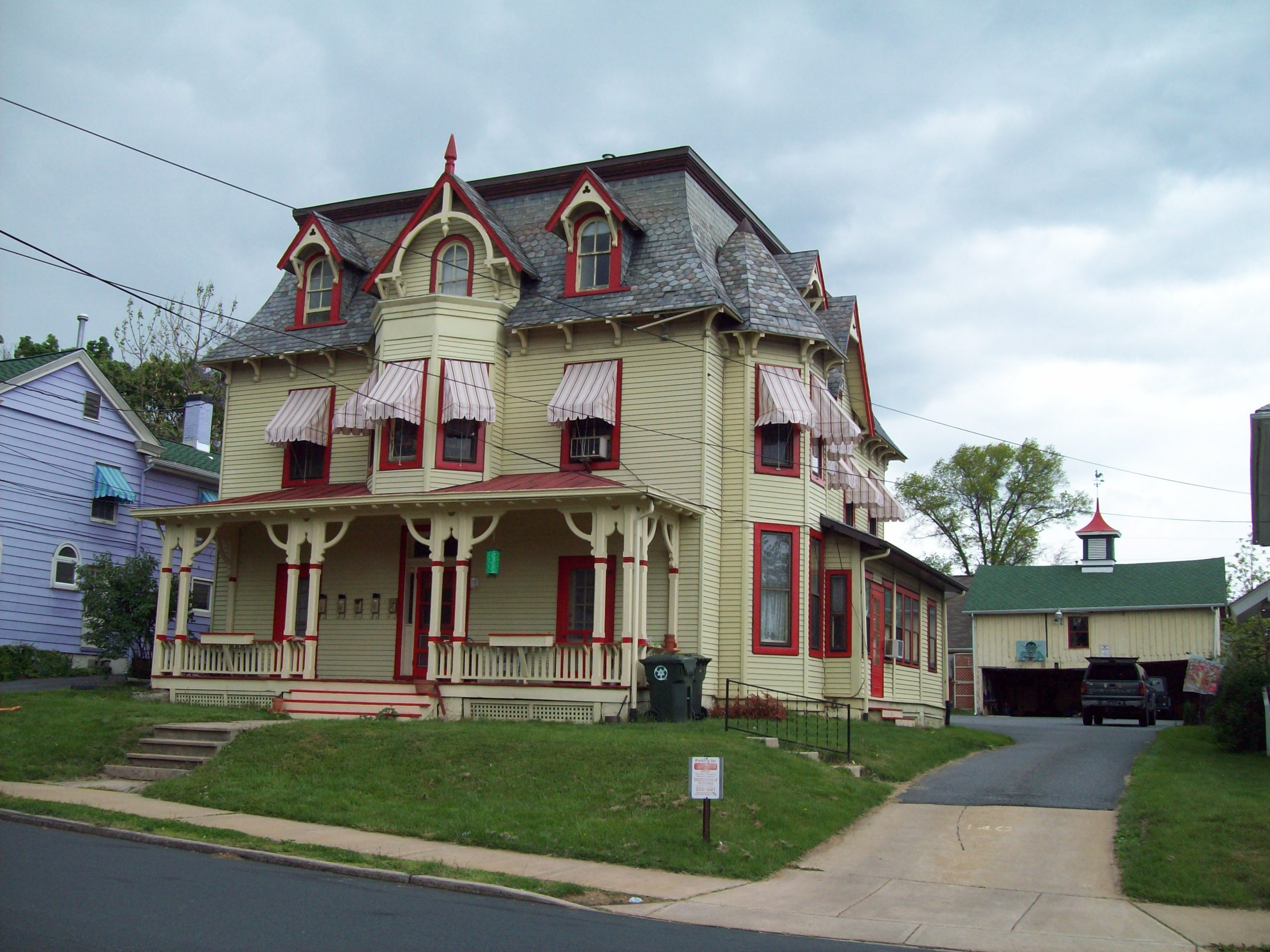
- Building at 140 W. Main Street, April 2010

- Location within Delaware Location within the United States
- Location: 140 Main St., Newark, Delaware
- Coordinates: 39.683813°N 75.757790°W
- Area: 0.2 acres (0.081 ha)
- Built: 1885
- Architectural style: Second Empire
- MPS: Newark MRA
- NRHP reference No.: 82002337
- Added to NRHP: May 7, 1982

Building at 140 W. Main Street is a historic home located at Newark in New Castle County, Delaware. It was built in 1885 and is a three-story, L-shaped frame residence in the Second Empire style. It was built as a single family home, but later divided into apartments. Also on the property is a carriage house.

It was added to the National Register of Historic Places in 1982.

== See also ==
- National Register of Historic Places listings in Newark, Delaware
