= Thomas Phillips Mill Complex =

- U.S. National Register of Historic Places
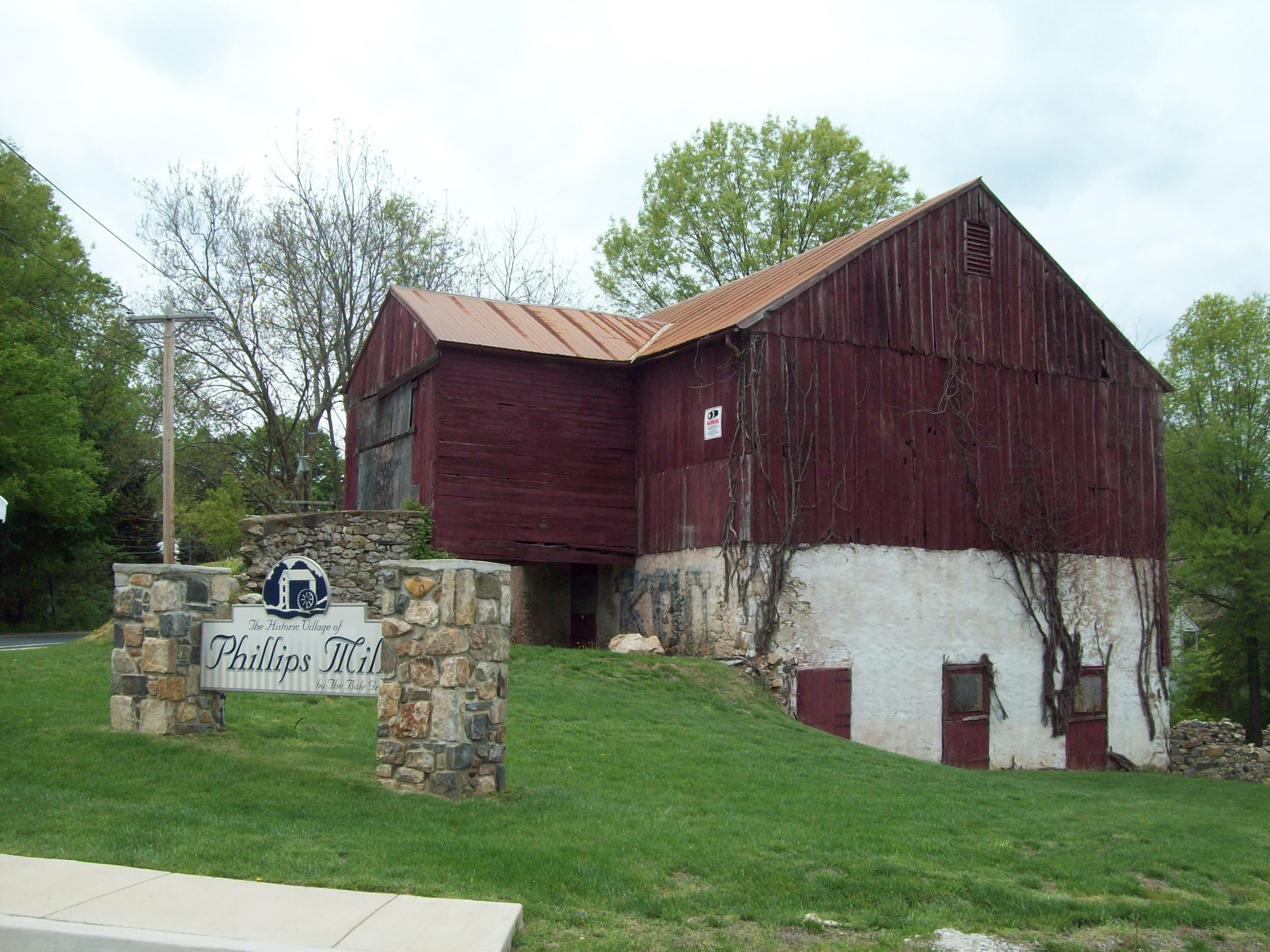
- Thomas Phillips Mill Complex, April 2010

- Location within Delaware Location within the United States
- Location: 708 and 712 Nottingham Rd., Newark, Delaware
- Coordinates: 39°41′29″N 75°46′40″W
- Area: 5.7 acres (2.3 ha)
- MPS: White Clay Creek Hundred MRA
- NRHP reference No.: 83001403
- Added to NRHP: August 19, 1983

Thomas Phillips Mill Complex is a historic mill complex located at Newark in New Castle County, Delaware. The complex includes a late 18th-century mill owner's house, a circa mid-19th-century miller's house, and a grist mill that was initially constructed in 1795. The mill is a banked, 2 1/2-story, gable-roofed building that is constructed of uncoursed rubble fieldstone at its basement and first floor levels, and of weatherboarded frame at its second story and attic levels.

It was added to the National Register of Historic Places in 1983.

== See also ==
- National Register of Historic Places listings in Newark, Delaware
