= Carswell House =

Historic house in Delaware, United States

- U.S. National Register of Historic Places
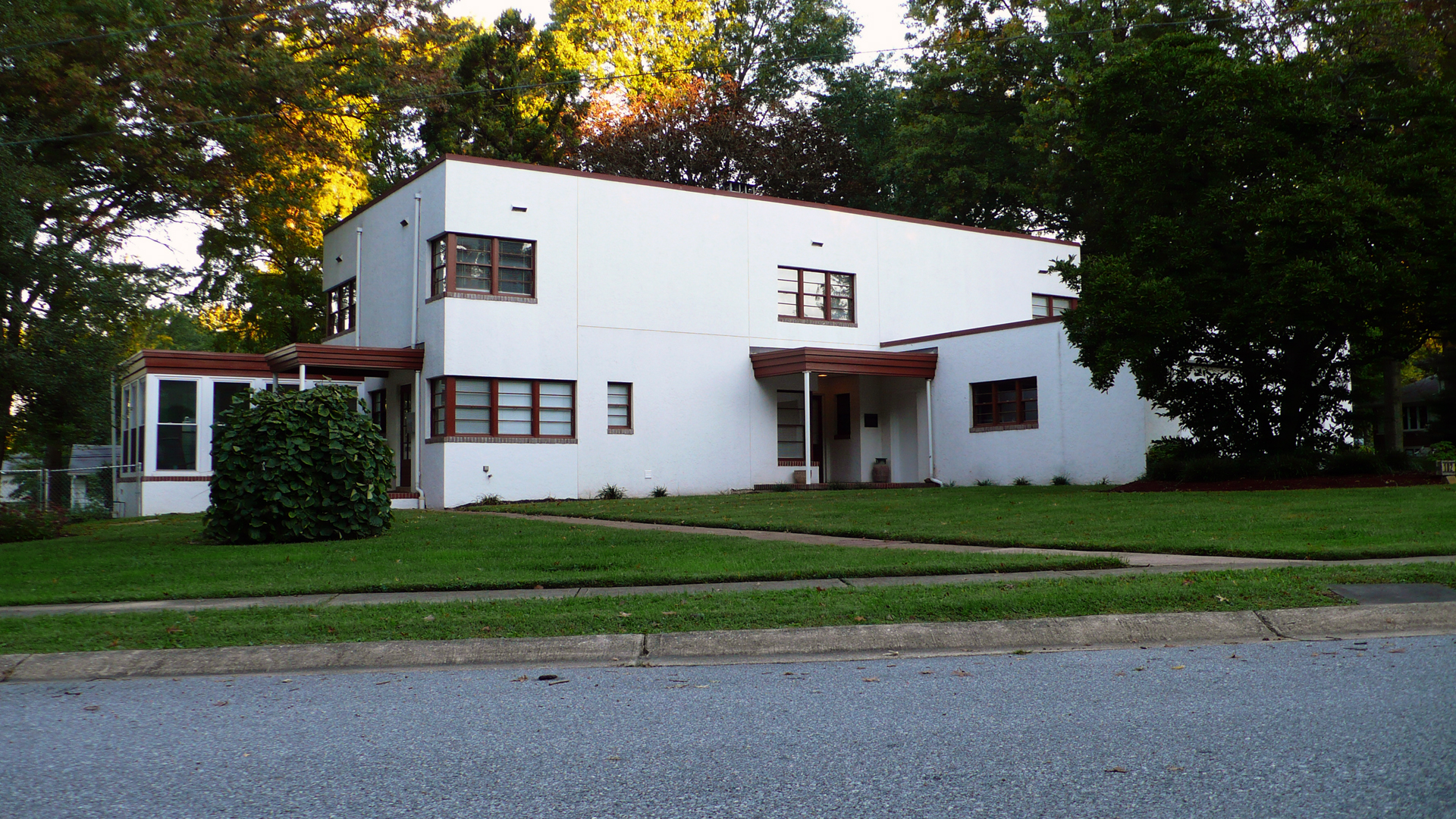
- The Carswell House in 2012

- Location within Delaware Location within the United States
- Location: 102 Briar Ln., Newark, Delaware
- Coordinates: 39°41′08″N 75°46′11″W
- Built: 1948
- Architect: Edward Durell Stone
- Architectural style: International style
- NRHP reference No.: 11000844
- Added to NRHP: November 22, 2011

The Stuart Randall and Priscilla Kellogg Carswell House is a historic house in Newark, Delaware. Built in 1948, it is an unusual example of International style architecture in Delaware.

The house was built by Stuart Carswell (1891–1949) and his wife Priscilla (1907–1991). Carswell, a Delaware native, was a career Army officer who fought in France during World War I. After seeing plans for an International style house in a 1936 issue of Collier's, the Carswells eventually decided they wanted to build a similar house for themselves. They commissioned an updated set of plans from Edward Durell Stone, the architect responsible for the design featured in Collier's, after Carswell's retirement from the military at the end of World War II. The house was completed in December 1948. Stuart Carswell died just six months later, and his widow sold the house in 1956.

Starting in 1999, the Carswell House was restored to its original appearance by its owners, both professors at the University of Delaware. The house was listed on the National Register of Historic Places in 2011 and the restoration project was completed the following year.

== See also ==
- National Register of Historic Places listings in Newark, Delaware
