= Meteer Store House =

- U.S. National Register of Historic Places
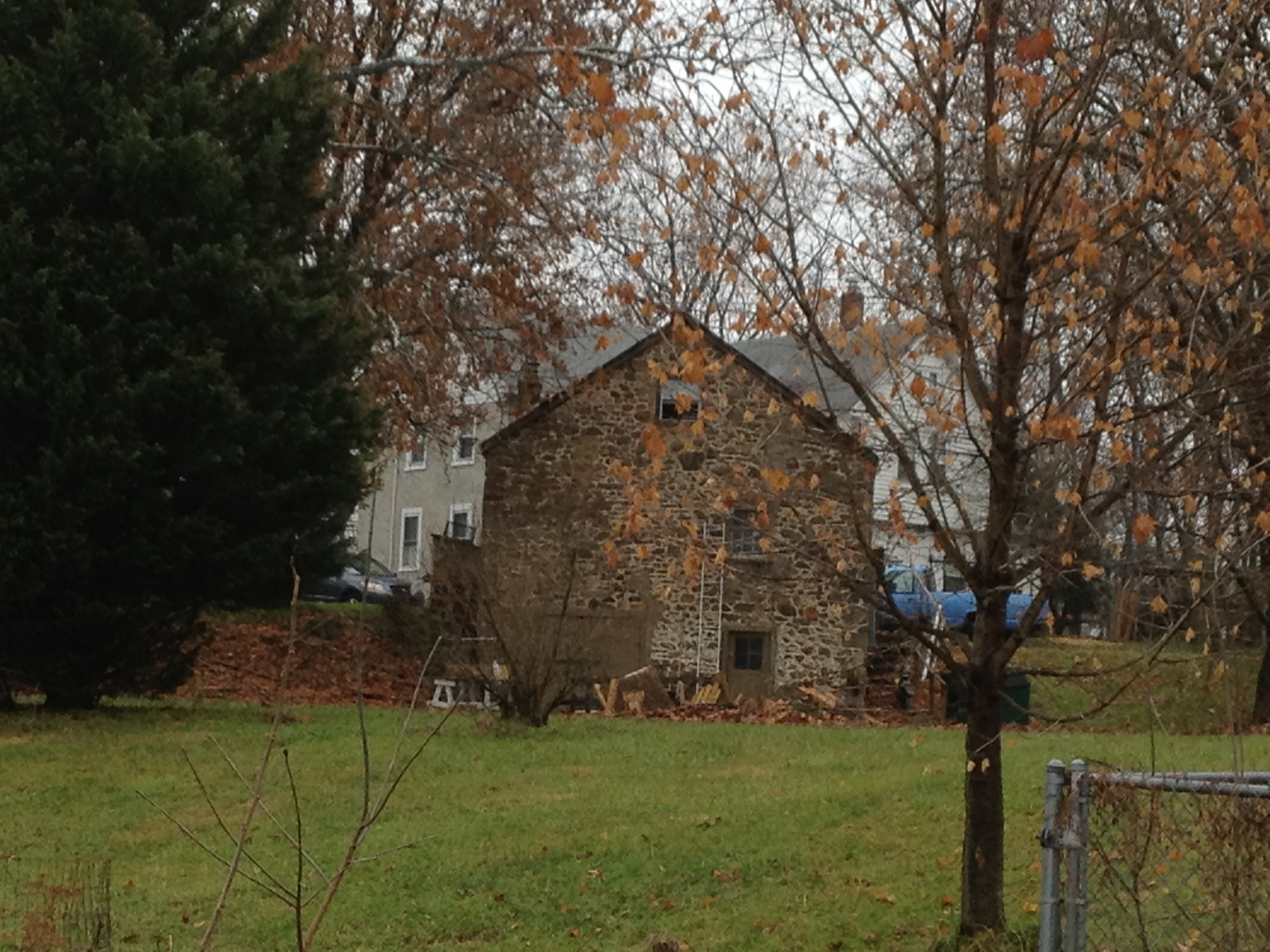

- Location within Delaware Location within the United States
- Location: 325 Paper Mill Rd., Newark, Delaware
- Coordinates: 39.691955°N 75.750082°W
- Area: 0.2 acres (0.081 ha)
- Built: 1808
- MPS: Newark MRA
- NRHP reference No.: 83001398
- Added to NRHP: February 24, 1983

Meteer Store House is a historic building located at Newark in New Castle County, Delaware. It was built in 1808 and is a one-story, rectangular structure built of uncoursed stone rubble. It was built as part of a paper manufacturing complex referred to as "Meteer's Mill."

It was added to the National Register of Historic Places in 1983. It is currently on private property.

== See also ==
- National Register of Historic Places listings in Newark, Delaware
