= Wright House (Newark, Delaware) =

Historic house in Delaware, United States

- U.S. National Register of Historic Places
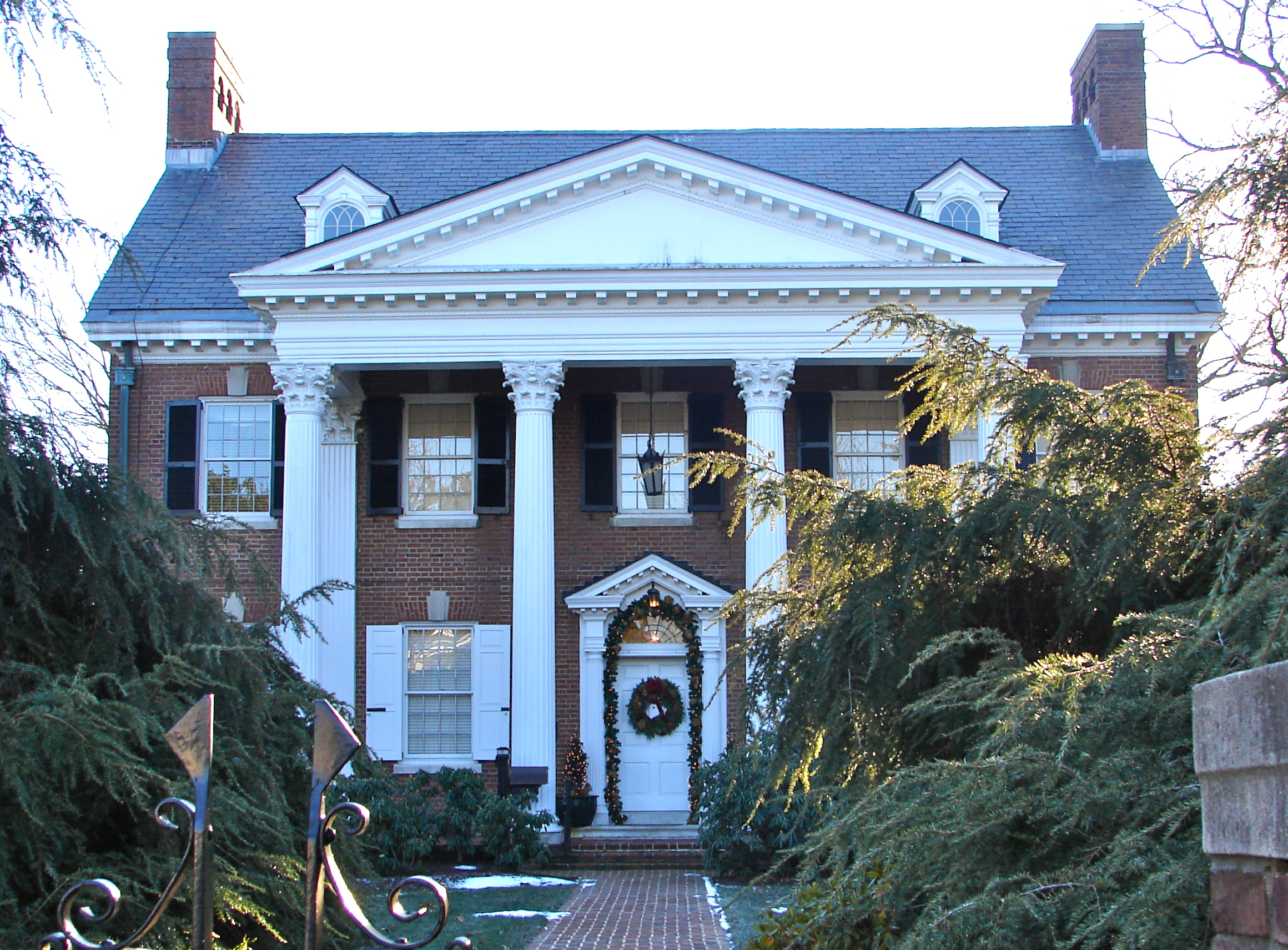
- Wright House, December 2010

- Location within Delaware Location within the United States
- Location: 47 Kent Way, Newark, Delaware
- Coordinates: 39.678910°N 75.755935°W
- Area: 2.5 acres (1.0 ha)
- Built: 1922
- Architectural style: Colonial Revival
- MPS: Newark MRA
- NRHP reference No.: 82002352
- Added to NRHP: May 7, 1982

Wright House is a historic home located at Newark, New Castle County, Delaware. It was built in 1922 and is a 2 1/2-story E-shaped brick dwelling with a five-bay front facade. It is in the Colonial Revival style. It features a three-bay main portico with fluted Corinthian order columns and a frame porte cochere. The house was purchased by the University of Delaware after 1950 and serves as the home of the University President.

It was added to the National Register of Historic Places in 1982.

== See also ==
- National Register of Historic Places listings in Newark, Delaware
