= Andrew Fisher House =

Historic house in Delaware, United States

- U.S. National Register of Historic Places
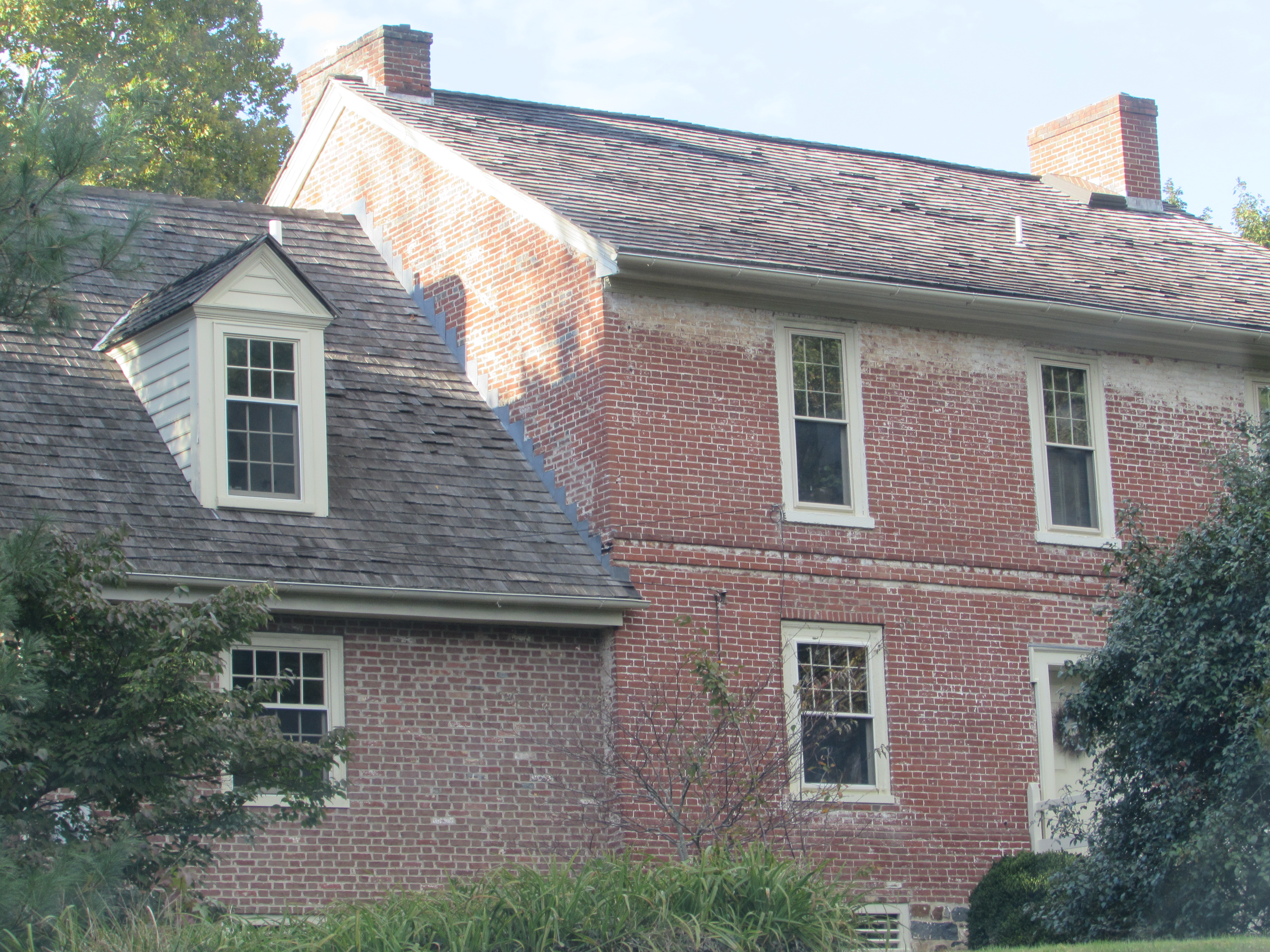
- The original house with its distinctive brickwork is on the right, while a later one-story addition with dormer is on the left.

- Location within Delaware Location within the United States
- Location: 725 Art Lane, Newark, Delaware
- Coordinates: 39.655172°N 75.755408°W
- Area: less than one acre
- Built: c. 1777
- NRHP reference No.: 73000525
- Added to NRHP: May 8, 1973

Andrew Fisher House is a historic home located at Newark, New Castle County, Delaware, United States. It was built about 1777, and is a two-story, three-bay, gable roofed brick dwelling. It has a one-story rear wing.

It was added to the National Register of Historic Places in 1972.

== See also ==
- National Register of Historic Places listings in Newark, Delaware
