= Edward R. Wilson House =

Historic house in Delaware, United States

- U.S. National Register of Historic Places
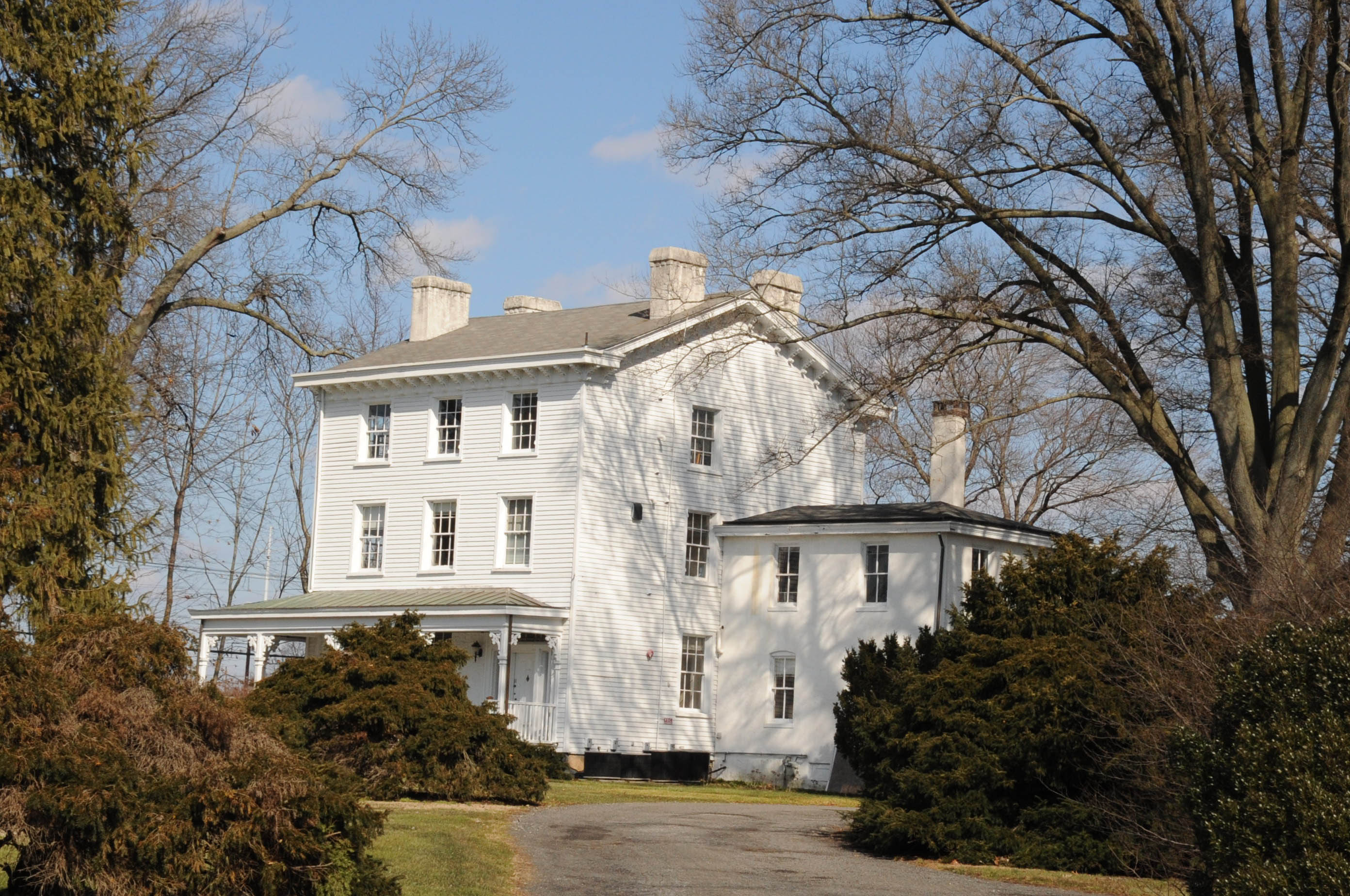

- Location within Delaware Location within the United States
- Location: 521 S. College Ave, Newark, Delaware
- Coordinates: 39.66900°N 75.75099°W
- Area: 0.1 acres (0.040 ha)
- Built: c. 1860
- Architectural style: Greek Revival, Italianate
- MPS: Newark MRA
- NRHP reference No.: 83001408
- Added to NRHP: April 25, 1983

Edward R. Wilson House, also known as the W. H. Schultz House, is a historic home located at Newark, New Castle County, Delaware. It was built about 1860, and is a three-story, gable-roofed frame dwelling with a porch running across its facade, north endwall, and rear elevation. It has a two-story brick wing built about 1900, and a later frame wing extending from the rear of the brick addition. It is in the Greek Revival / Italianate style. Since 1907, the house is part of the University of Delaware Farm, an agricultural experiment station managed by its College of Agriculture. The house was used as a dormitory during the 1980s and has since been repurposed to serve as offices for the College of Agriculture and Natural Resources at the University of Delaware.

It was listed on the National Register of Historic Places in 1983.

== See also ==
- National Register of Historic Places listings in Newark, Delaware
