= Charles and Edith Liedlich House =

Historic house in Delaware, United States

- U.S. National Register of Historic Places
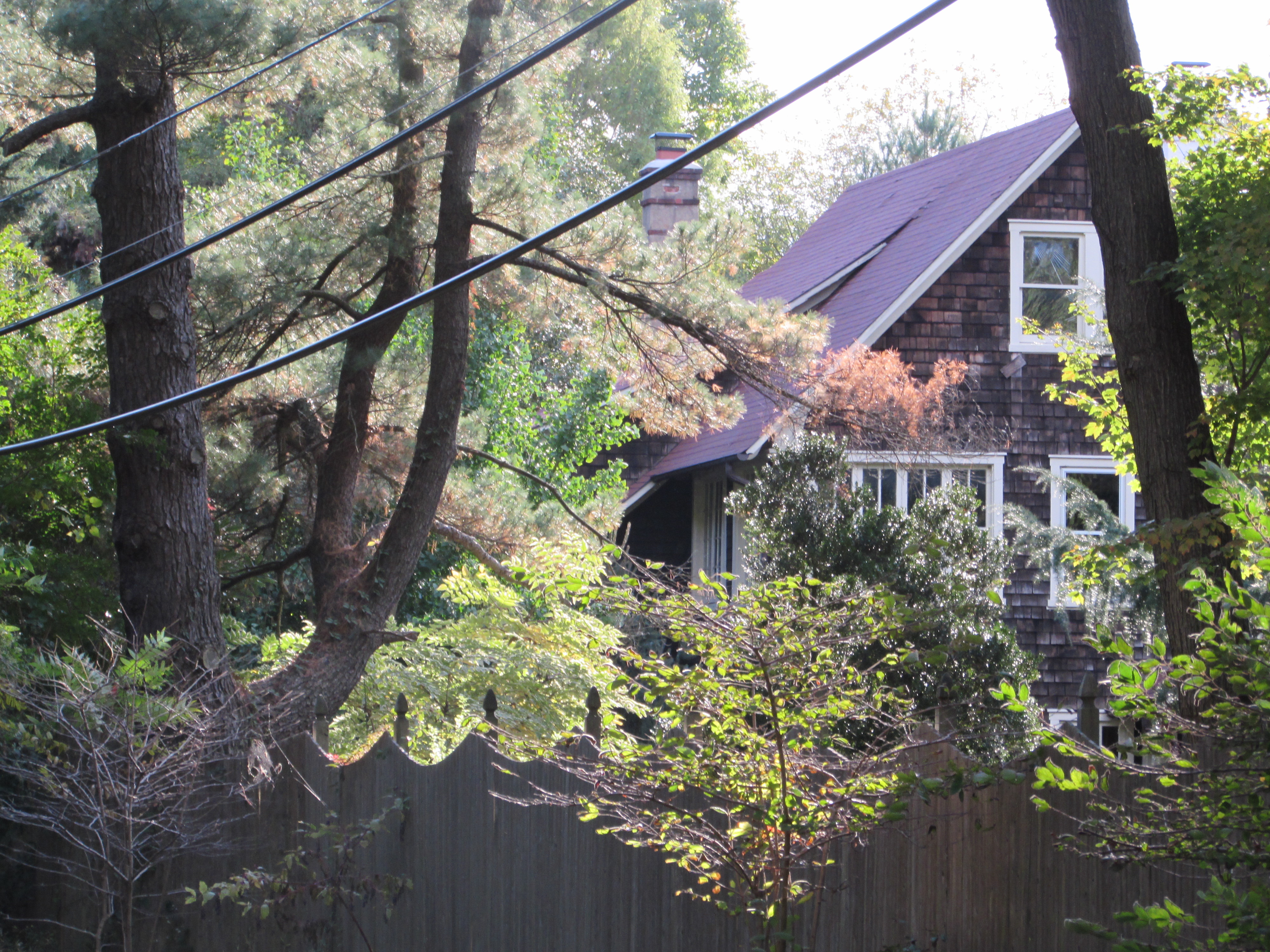
- Side of the Liedlich House, showing the roof of the dormer.

- Location within Delaware Location within the United States
- Location: 180 Welsh Tract Rd., Newark, Delaware
- Coordinates: 39.64421°N 75.76148°W
- Area: 5 acres (2.0 ha)
- Built: c. 1919
- Built by: Leidlich, Charles
- Architectural style: Bungalow/craftsman
- NRHP reference No.: 06000283
- Added to NRHP: April 19, 2006

Charles and Edith Liedlich House is a historic home located near Newark, New Castle County, Delaware. It was built about 1919, and is a 2 1/2-story, rectangular wood frame dwelling in the American Craftsman / Bungalow style. It sits on a rubble stone foundation and has a side gable roof with dormers. It has an enclosed porch with sleeping porch above. Also on the property is a contributing 1 1/2-story stucco and shingled garage.

It was added to the National Register of Historic Places in 2006.

== See also ==
- National Register of Historic Places listings in Newark, Delaware
