= Bell Farmhouse =

Historic house in Delaware, United States

- U.S. National Register of Historic Places
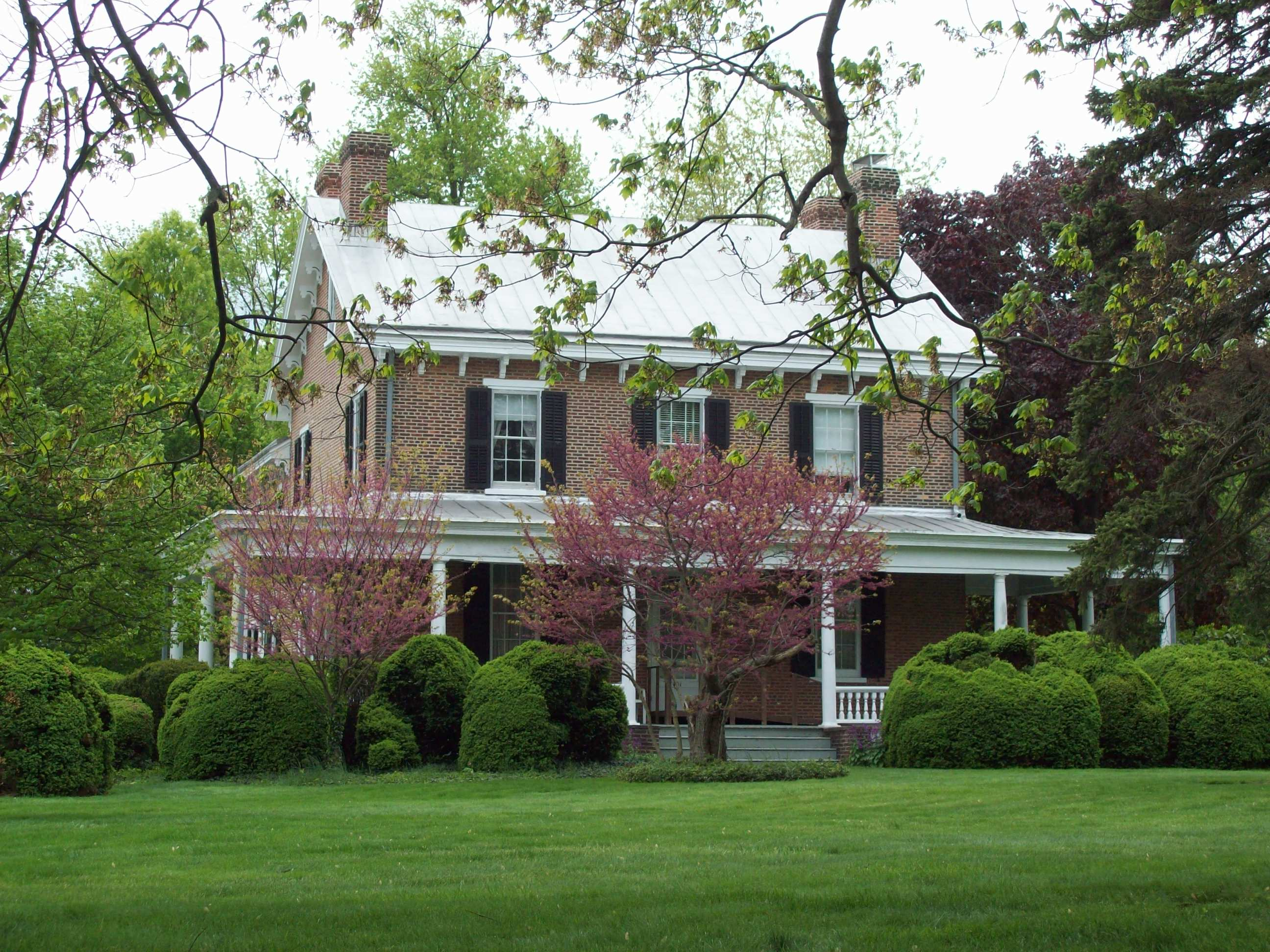
- Bell Farmhouse, April 2010

- Location within Delaware Location within the United States
- Location: 401 Nottingham Rd., Newark, Delaware
- Coordinates: 39.687628°N 75.770127°W
- Area: 1.4 acres (0.57 ha)
- Built: 1845
- Architectural style: Georgian
- MPS: Newark MRA
- NRHP reference No.: 83001344
- Added to NRHP: February 24, 1983

Bell Farmhouse is a historic home located at Newark in New Castle County, Delaware. The farmhouse was built about 1845 and is a two-story, gable-roofed brick building with an original two-story ell in the rear. It features a massive Doric columned wrap-around porch. Also on the property is a smokehouse, carriage house, and shed.

It was added to the National Register of Historic Places in 1983.

== See also ==
- National Register of Historic Places listings in Newark, Delaware
