= Chambers House (College Avenue, Newark, Delaware) =

Historic house in Delaware, United States

- U.S. National Register of Historic Places
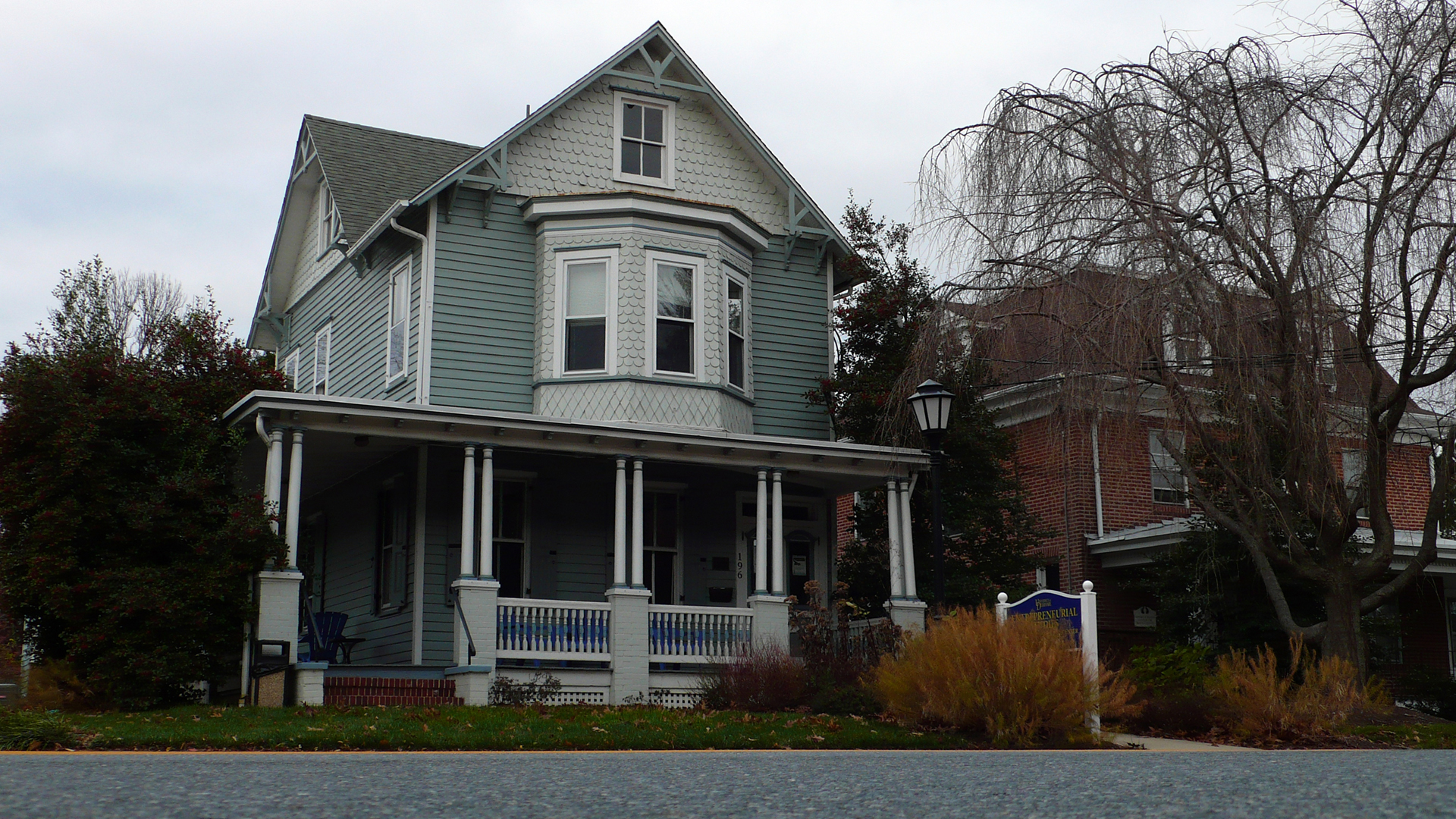
- Chambers House, November 2012

- Location within Delaware Location within the United States
- Location: 196 South College Avenue, Newark, Delaware
- Coordinates: 39.678280°N 75.753880°W
- Area: 0.2 acres (0.081 ha)
- Built: 1890
- Built by: Chambers, Gilbert W.
- Architectural style: Queen Anne
- MPS: Newark MRA
- NRHP reference No.: 83001389
- Added to NRHP: February 24, 1983

Chambers House is a historic home located at Newark in New Castle County, Delaware. It was built in 1890 and is a two-story, frame dwelling in the Queen Anne style. It features cross gables, bay windows, and a wrap-around porch. Also on the property is a contributing carriage house. It was the home of the Chambers family until 1980, after which it was purchased by the University of Delaware. It currently serves as the University's Venture Development Center, which is a laboratory for students and faculty developing new businesses.

It was added to the National Register of Historic Places in 1983.

== See also ==
- National Register of Historic Places listings in Newark, Delaware
