= R. Walker Barn =

- U.S. National Register of Historic Places
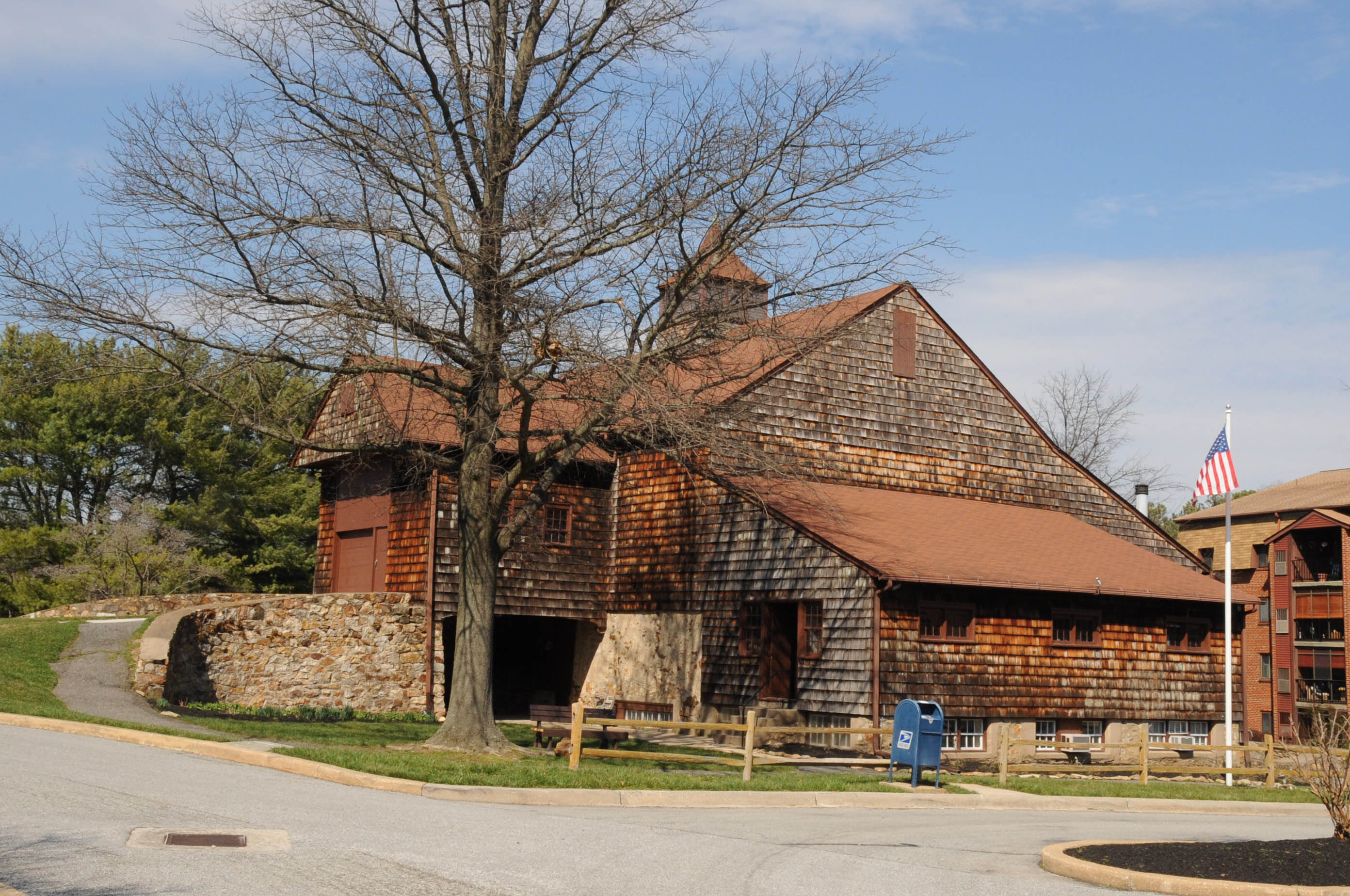
- The barn in 2016

- Location within Delaware Location within the United States
- Location: Rustic Ln., near Newark, Delaware
- Coordinates: 39°44′16″N 75°41′47″W
- Area: 0.5 acres (0.20 ha)
- Built: c. 1835
- Architectural style: Tri-level barn
- MPS: Agricultural Buildings and Complexes in Mill Creek Hundred, 1800-1840 TR
- NRHP reference No.: 86003082
- Added to NRHP: November 13, 1986

R. Walker Barn is a historic barn located near Newark, New Castle County, Delaware. It was built about 1835, and is a tri-level or double decker, frame structure on a stuccoed stone foundation with an original straw shed and bridge house. It has a two level shed-roofed addition and a gable-roofed, two level wing. It features a gable roof with a late-19th century louvered cupola.

It was added to the National Register of Historic Places in 1986.

== See also ==
- National Register of Historic Places listings in Newark, Delaware
