= Bank of Newark Building =

- U.S. National Register of Historic Places
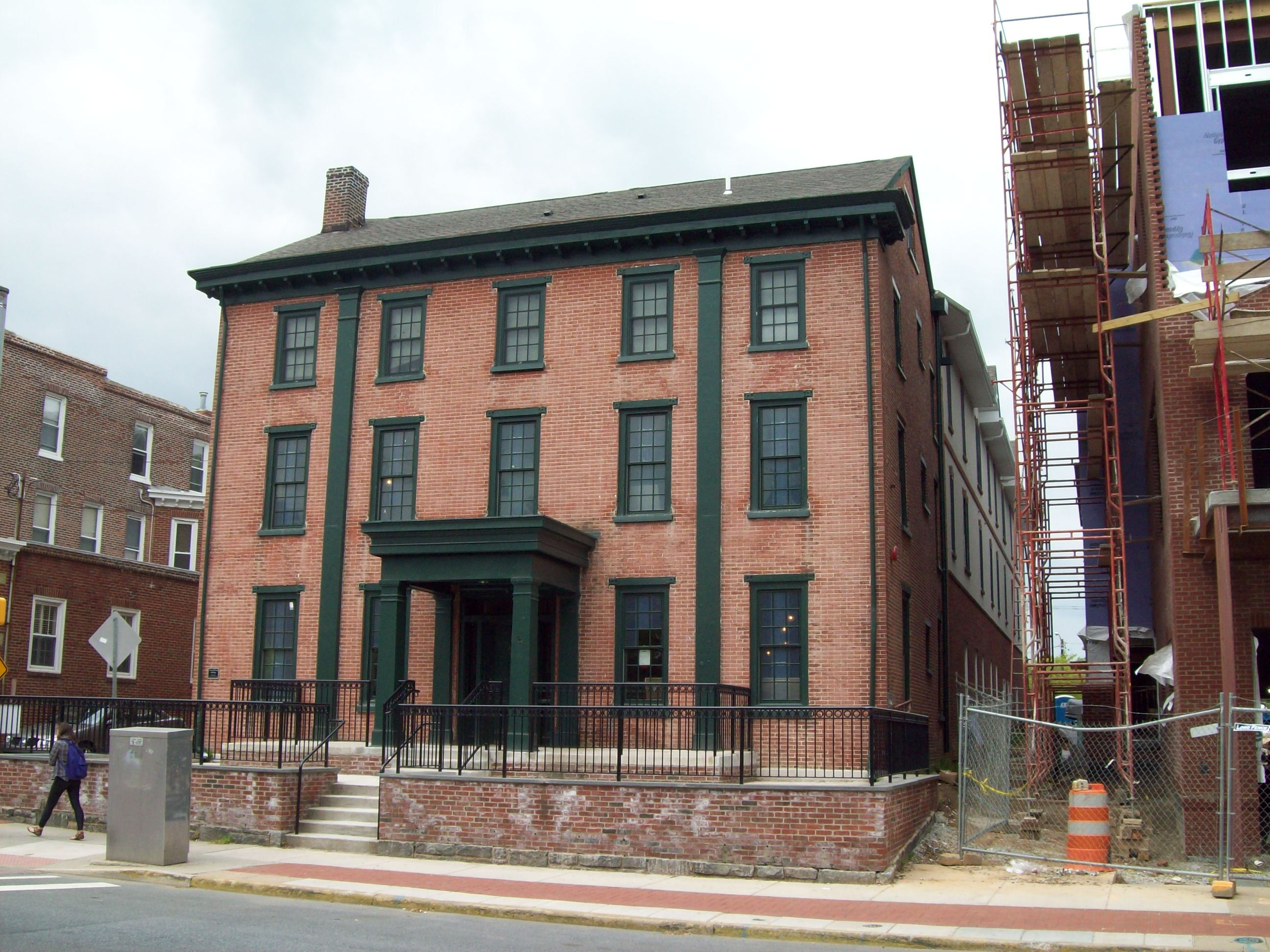
- Bank of Newark Building, April 2010

- Location within Delaware Location within the United States
- Location: 102 E. Main St., Newark, Delaware
- Coordinates: 39°41′0.6″N 75°44′57.2″W
- Area: 0.4 acres (0.16 ha)
- Built: 1845
- Architectural style: Greek Revival
- MPS: Newark MRA
- NRHP reference No.: 83001345
- Added to NRHP: February 24, 1983

Bank of Newark Building is a historic bank building located at Newark in New Castle County, Delaware. It was built about 1845 and is a three-story, gable-roofed brick building with a symmetrical five-bay facade and a three-story ell to the rear. It is in a restrained form of the Greek Revival style. The front facade features a portico and massive pilasters added sometime after 1929.

In 2010, a second location of the popular Wilmington, DE restaurant Catherine Rooney's moved into the original section of this building. As of 2025, this space is now occupied by the Greenhouse Gastropub.

It was added to the National Register of Historic Places in 1983.

== See also ==
- National Register of Historic Places listings in Newark, Delaware
