= Rotheram Mill House =

Historic house in Delaware, United States

- U.S. National Register of Historic Places
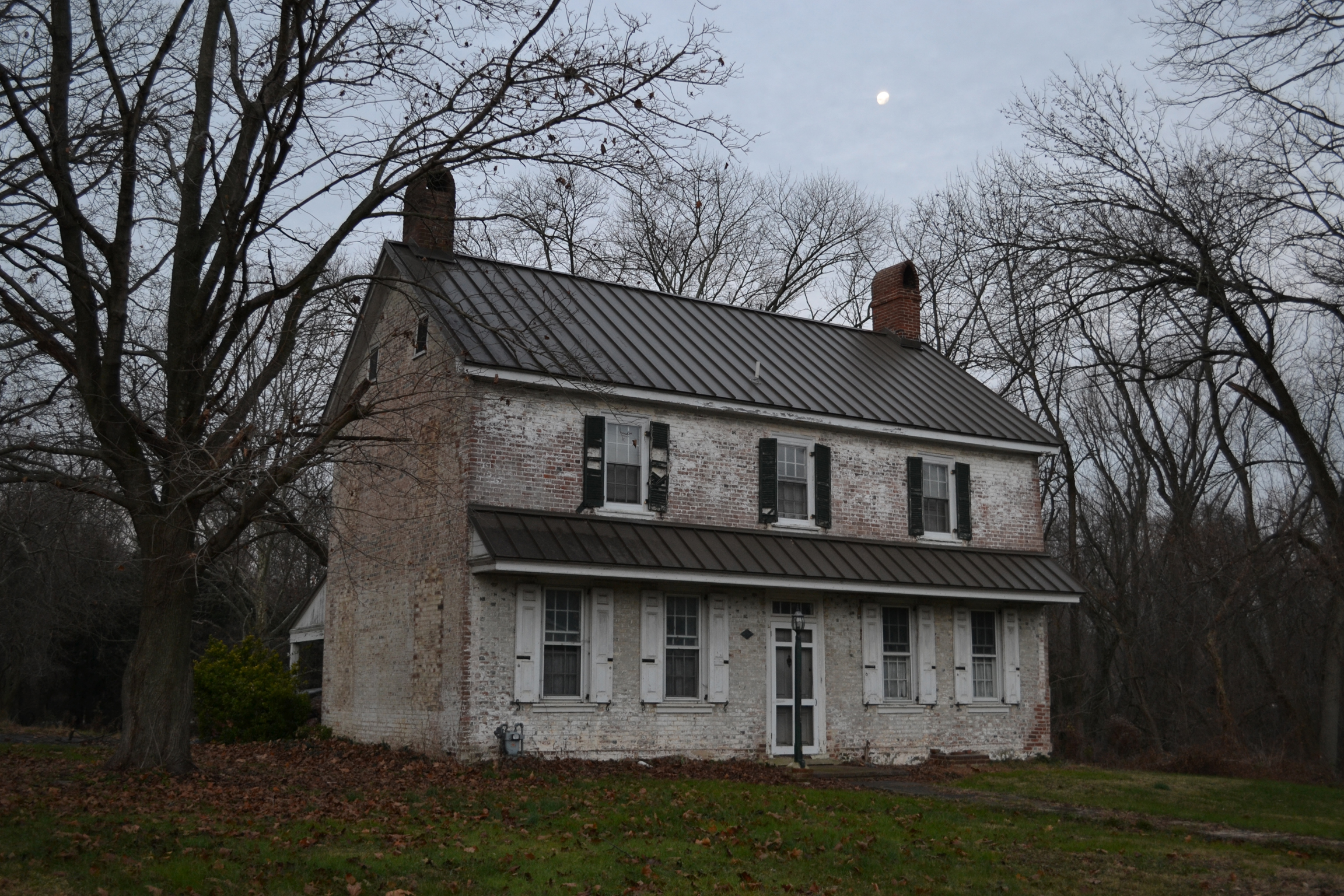
- Rotheram Mill House, December 2012

- Location within Delaware Location within the United States
- Location: 318 Harmony Rd., Newark, Delaware
- Coordinates: 39.696867°N 75.694502°W
- Area: 4 acres (1.6 ha)
- Built: c. 1740
- NRHP reference No.: 72000287
- Added to NRHP: January 4, 1972

Rotheram Mill House, also known as Harmony Mills, is a historic home located at Newark, New Castle County, Delaware. The house was built about 1740, as a 1 1/2-story, five-bay, gambrel roofed brick dwelling. Before 1775, the roof was raised to a full three-bay second story with a gable roof. It has a two-story rear kitchen wing.

It was added to the National Register of Historic Places in 1972.

== See also ==
- National Register of Historic Places listings in Newark, Delaware
