= Joseph Dean & Son Woolen Mill =

- U.S. National Register of Historic Places
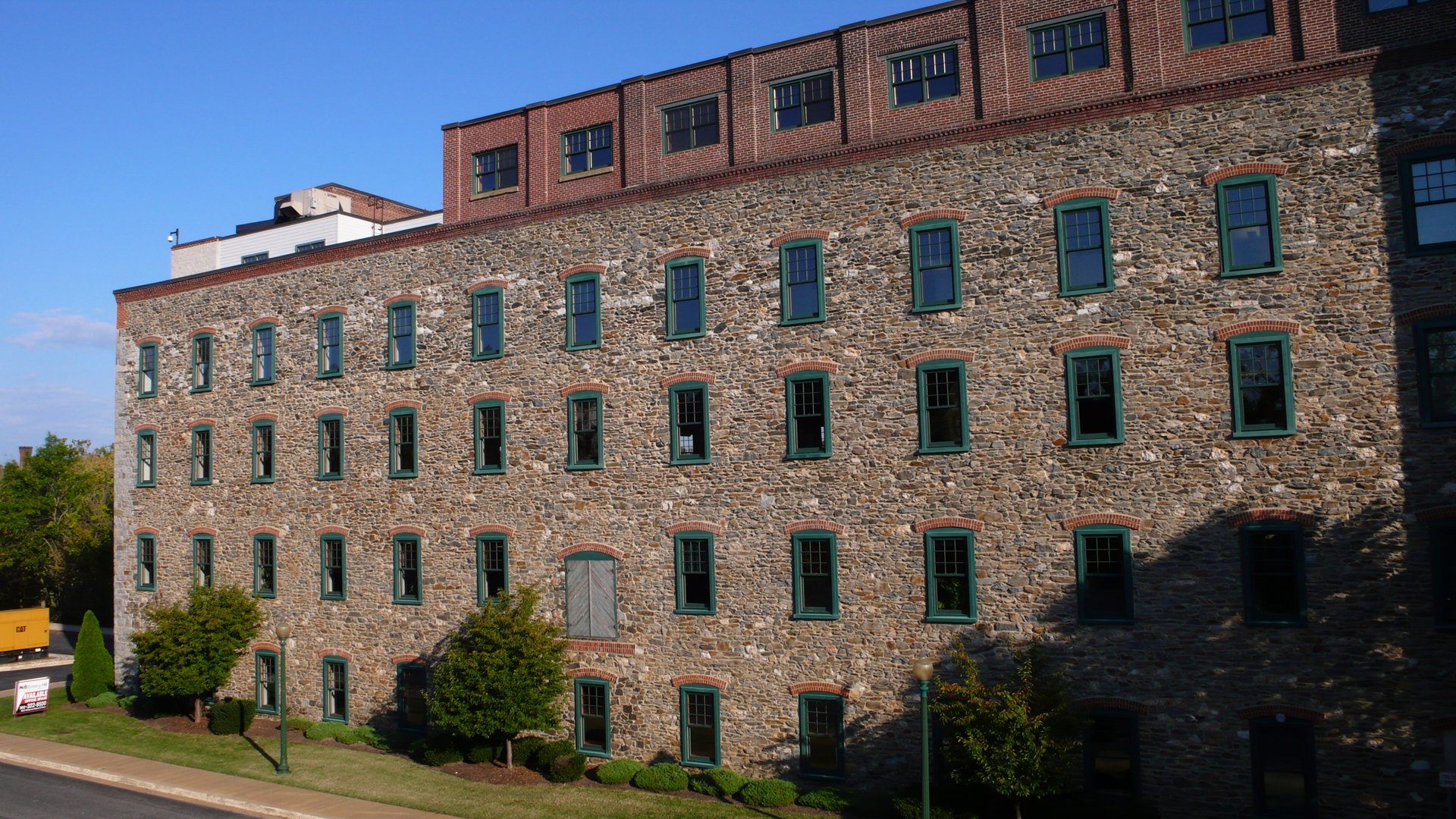
- Joseph Dean & Son Woolen Mill, September 2012

- Location within Delaware Location within the United States
- Location: 500 Creek View Rd., Newark, Delaware
- Coordinates: 39.689508°N 75.745507°W
- Area: 8 acres (3.2 ha)
- Built: 1845
- NRHP reference No.: 78000901
- Added to NRHP: May 22, 1978

Joseph Dean & Son Woolen Mill, also known as NVF Company, Newark Fibre Plant, is a historic woolen mill located at Newark in New Castle County, Delaware. The property includes seven contributing buildings and one contributing site. The oldest mill structure is a four-story stone structure with a corbelled brick cornice and flat roof. It is approximately 200 feet (61 m) by 62 feet (19 m) and has a brick fifth story over half its length.

It was added to the National Register of Historic Places in 1982.

== See also ==
- National Register of Historic Places listings in Newark, Delaware
