= George Evans House =

Historic house in Delaware, United States

- U.S. National Register of Historic Places
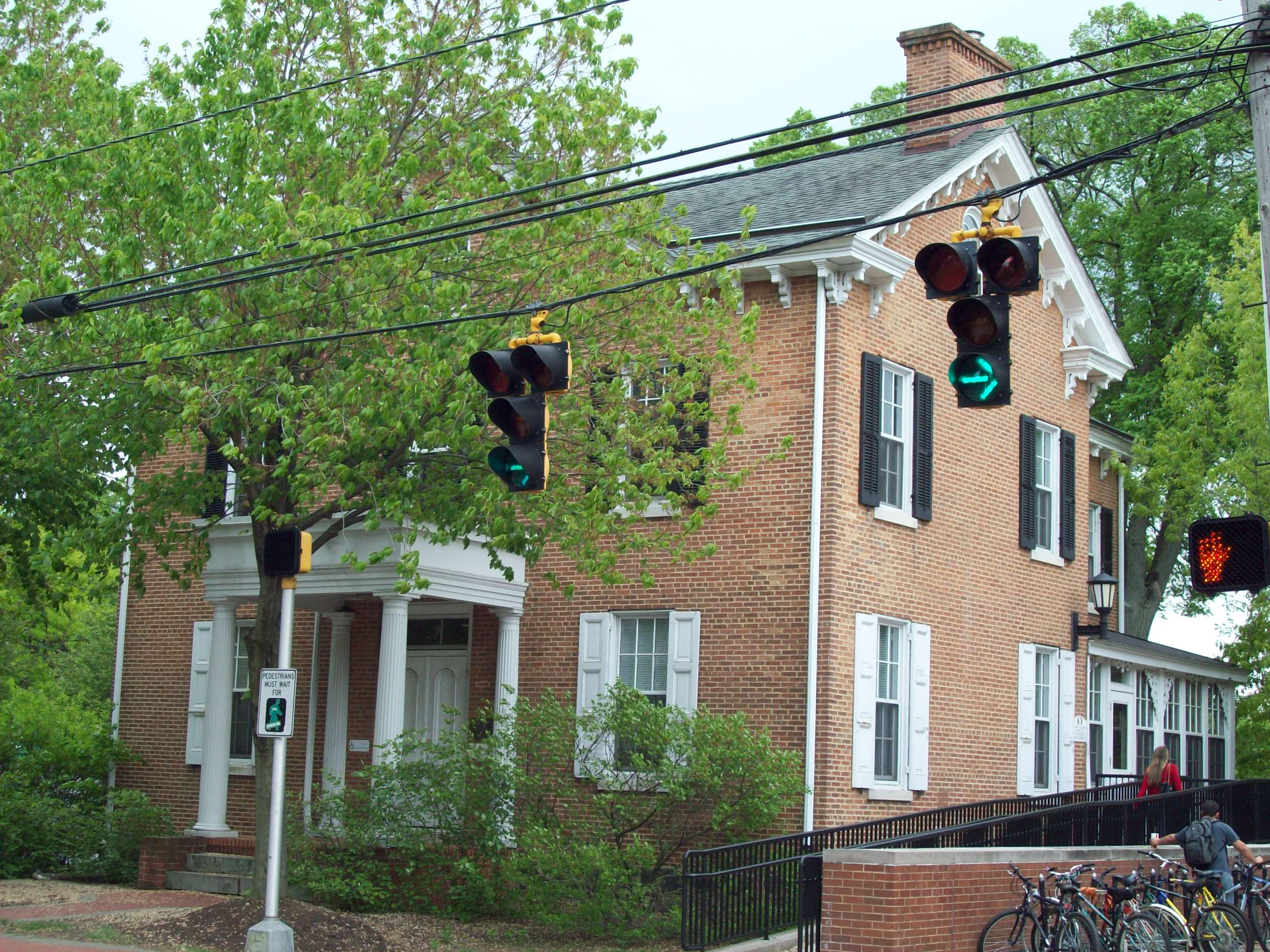
- George Evans House, April 2010

- Location within Delaware Location within the United States
- Location: 5 W. Main St., Newark, Delaware
- Coordinates: 39.682828°N 75.753951°W
- Area: 1 acre (0.40 ha)
- Built: 1856
- Architectural style: Italianate
- MPS: Newark MRA
- NRHP reference No.: 82002342
- Added to NRHP: May 7, 1982

George Evans House, owned by the University of Delaware, is a historic home located at Newark in New Castle County, Delaware. It was completed in 1863 and is a 2 1/2-story, brick structure with a stone foundation, T-shaped plan, and cross-gable roof. The main facade is three bays, featuring a one-bay portico supported by Doric order columns. Its builder, George Gillespie Evans served as Secretary of the Board of Trustees of the University of Delaware from 1856 to 1903.

It was added to the National Register of Historic Places in 1982.

== See also ==
- National Register of Historic Places listings in Newark, Delaware
