= Exchange Building (Newark, Delaware) =

- U.S. National Register of Historic Places
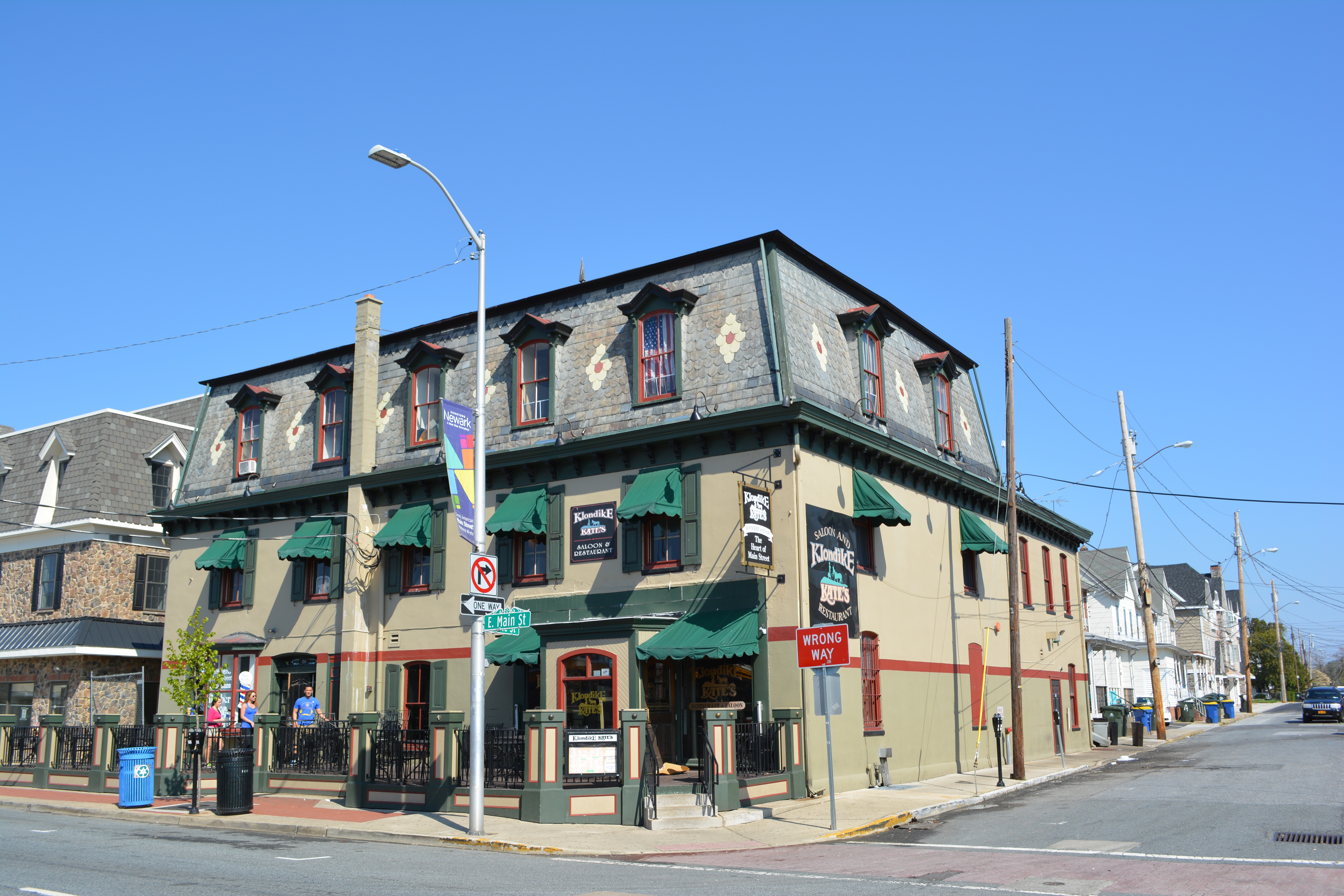
- Exchange Building, April 2014

- Location within Delaware Location within the United States
- Location: 154-158 E. Main St., Newark, Delaware
- Coordinates: 39°41′01″N 75°44′49″W
- Area: 0.2 acres (0.081 ha)
- Built: 1880
- Architectural style: Second Empire, Mansard
- MPS: Newark MRA
- NRHP reference No.: 82002343
- Added to NRHP: May 7, 1982

Exchange Building, also known as Center Building, Center Hall, and the Grange Building is a historic commercial building located at Newark in New Castle County, Delaware. It was built in 1880 and is a three-story rectangular, stucco coated building with a five bay facade. It features a deep mansard roof enclosing the third floor and covered in slate in the Second Empire style. A prison cell dated to about 1905 is located in the building's basement when, reportedly, a courthouse was located at this address. A barber shop has operated in the same location on the first floor of the Exchange Building for over 100 years. Klondike Kate's, a restaurant, occupies the rest of the ground floor.

It was added to the National Register of Historic Places in 1982.

== See also ==
- National Register of Historic Places listings in Newark, Delaware
