= Building at 28–34½ Academy Street =

- U.S. National Register of Historic Places
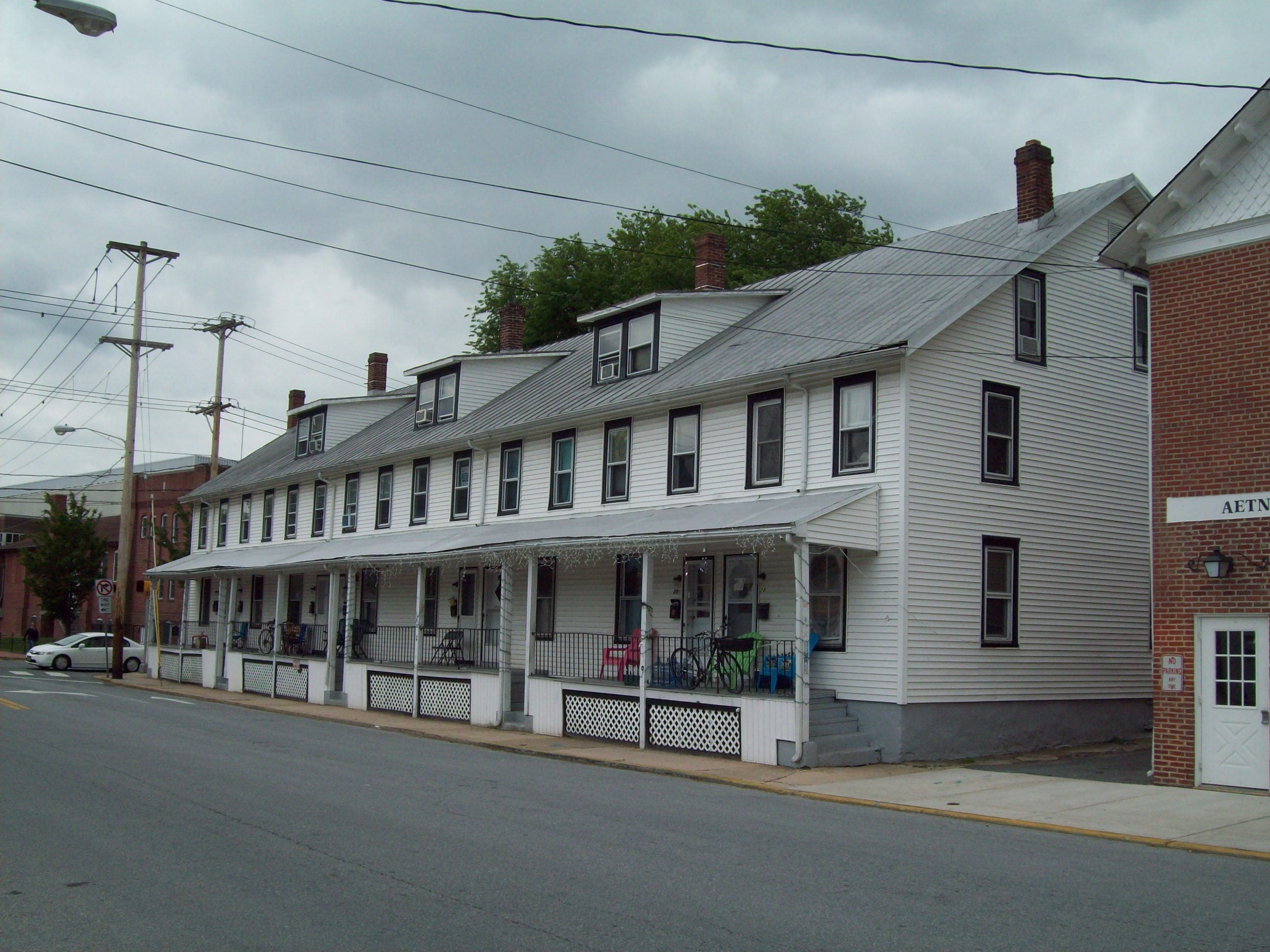
- April 2010

- Location within Delaware Location within the United States
- Location: 28–34½ Academy St., Newark, Delaware
- Coordinates: 39.682194°N 75.749610°W
- Area: 0.2 acres (0.081 ha)
- Built: 1888
- MPS: Newark MRA
- NRHP reference No.: 82002338
- Added to NRHP: May 7, 1982

Building at 28–34½ Academy Street is a historic apartment building located at Newark in New Castle County, Delaware. It was built in 1888 and is a 2 1/2-story frame structure with 16 bays at the east main facade. It was built as an eight unit row house.

It is commonly known as "Skid Row" to Newark residents and is a popular housing location for University of Delaware students. For many years, twice a year, a major music event named "Skidfest" was held in the rear yard of the structure.

It was added to the National Register of Historic Places in 1982.

== See also ==
- National Register of Historic Places listings in Newark, Delaware
