= National Register of Historic Places listings in Newark, Delaware =

This is intended to be a complete list of the properties and districts on National Register of Historic Places in Newark, Delaware. The locations of National Register properties and districts for which the latitude and longitude coordinates are included below, may be seen in a map.

For reasons of size, the listings in New Castle County are divided into four lists: those in Wilmington, those in Newark, other listings in northern New Castle County (north of the Chesapeake and Delaware Canal), and those in southern New Castle County (south of the Chesapeake and Delaware Canal).

There are 402 properties and districts listed on the National Register in the county. Of those, 49 sites are listed here.

This National Park Service list is complete through NPS recent listings posted May 1, 2026.

Contents: Counties and municipalities in Delaware
Newark (New Castle) | Wilmington (New Castle) | Northern New Castle | Southern New Castle | Kent | Sussex

== List ==
	Name on the Register	Image	Date listed	Location	City or town	Description
1	Academy of Newark	Academy of Newark	May 24, 1976 (#76000573)	105 E. Main St. 39°40′58″N 75°44′57″W	Newark	University of Delaware
2	Aetna Hose, Hook and Ladder Company Fire Station No. 1	Aetna Hose, Hook and Ladder Company Fire Station No. 1	May 7, 1982 (#82002335)	26 Academy St. 39°40′57″N 75°44′59″W	Newark	
3	Aetna Hose, Hook and Ladder Company, Fire Station No. 2	Aetna Hose, Hook and Ladder Company, Fire Station No. 2	May 7, 1982 (#82002334)	31 Academy St. 39°40′56″N 75°44′57″W	Newark	
4	Anderson House	Anderson House	February 24, 1983 (#83001384)	50 W. Park Pl. 39°40′30″N 75°45′22″W	Newark	
5	Baily House	Baily House	May 7, 1982 (#82002336)	166 W. Main St. 39°41′03″N 75°45′32″W	Newark	
6	Bank of Newark Building	Bank of Newark Building	February 24, 1983 (#83001345)	102 E. Main St. 39°41′01″N 75°44′57″W	Newark	
7	Bell Farmhouse	Bell Farmhouse	February 24, 1983 (#83001344)	401 Nottingham Rd. 39°41′15″N 75°46′12″W	Newark	
8	Belmont Hall	Belmont Hall	February 24, 1983 (#83001386)	302 W. Main St. 39°41′02″N 75°45′39″W	Newark	University of Delaware
9	Blue Hen Farm	Blue Hen Farm	February 24, 1983 (#83001346)	505 Stamford Dr. 39°41′45″N 75°45′59″W	Newark	
10	Building at 28–34½ Academy Street	Building at 28–34½ Academy Street	May 7, 1982 (#82002338)	28–34½ Academy St. 39°40′56″N 75°44′59″W	Newark	
11	Building at 140 W. Main Street	Building at 140 W. Main Street	May 7, 1982 (#82002337)	140 W. Main St. 39°41′02″N 75°45′28″W	Newark	
12	Building at 34 Choate Street	Building at 34 Choate Street	February 24, 1983 (#83001387)	34 Choate St. 39°41′05″N 75°44′49″W	Newark	
13	Stuart Randall & Pricilla Kellogg Carswell House	Stuart Randall & Pricilla Kellogg Carswell House	November 22, 2011 (#11000844)	102 Briar Ln. 39°41′08″N 75°46′11″W	Newark	
14	Chambers House	Chambers House	February 24, 1983 (#83001389)	196 S. College Ave. 39°40′42″N 75°45′14″W	Newark	University of Delaware
15	Curtis Mansion	Curtis Mansion	May 7, 1982 (#82002339)	183 W. Main St. 39°41′02″N 75°45′37″W	Newark	English Language Institute of the University of Delaware
16	Curtis Paper Mill Workers' Houses	Curtis Paper Mill Workers' Houses	May 7, 1982 (#82002340)	Curtis Lane; 39°41′27″N 75°44′56″W	Newark	
17	Joseph Dean & Son Woolen Mill	Joseph Dean & Son Woolen Mill	May 22, 1978 (#78000901)	500 Creek View Rd. 39°41′22″N 75°44′44″W	Newark	
18	Deer Park Farm	Deer Park Farm	February 24, 1983 (#83001347)	48 W. Park Pl. 39°40′30″N 75°45′21″W	Newark	Demolished
19	Deer Park Hotel	Deer Park Hotel	May 7, 1982 (#82002341)	108 W. Main St. 39°40′59″N 75°45′22″W	Newark	
20	George Evans House	George Evans House	May 7, 1982 (#82002342)	5 W. Main St. 39°40′58″N 75°45′14″W	Newark	University of Delaware
21	John Evans House	John Evans House	February 24, 1983 (#83001392)	14 W. Main St. 39°40′59″N 75°45′15″W	Newark	Raub Hall of the University of Delaware
22	Exchange Building	Exchange Building	May 7, 1982 (#82002343)	154–158 E. Main St. 39°41′01″N 75°44′49″W	Newark	Klondike Kate's
23	Andrew Fisher House	Andrew Fisher House	May 8, 1973 (#73000525)	725 Art Ln. 39°39′19″N 75°45′19″W	Newark	
24	Granite Mansion	Granite Mansion	February 24, 1983 (#83001394)	292 W. Main St. 39°41′11″N 75°45′50″W	Newark	Demolished, photo shows church on the site
25	Green Mansion	Green Mansion	February 24, 1983 (#83001395)	94–96 E. Main St. 39°41′01″N 75°44′58″W	Newark	
26	Andrew Kerr House	Andrew Kerr House	August 19, 1983 (#83001342)	812 Elkton Rd. 39°40′16″N 75°46′13″W	Newark	
27	Charles and Edith Liedlich House	Charles and Edith Liedlich House	April 19, 2006 (#06000283)	180 Welsh Tract Rd. 39°38′39″N 75°45′41″W	Newark	
28	Memorial Hall	Memorial Hall	May 7, 1982 (#82002344)	University of Delaware campus 39°40′44″N 75°45′08″W	Newark	University of Delaware
29	Meteer Store House	Meteer Store House	February 24, 1983 (#83001398)	325 Paper Mill Rd. 39°41′31″N 75°45′00″W	Newark	
30	Mitchell-Biden House	Mitchell-Biden House	July 28, 2025 (#100012038)	228 North Star Road; 39°45′32″N 75°43′21″W	Newark vicinity	
31	Newark Opera House	Newark Opera House	May 7, 1982 (#82002345)	95 E. Main St. 39°40′59″N 75°44′59″W	Newark	
32	Newark Passenger Station	Newark Passenger Station	May 7, 1982 (#82002346)	429 S. College Ave. 39°40′13″N 75°45′11″W	Newark	Newark History Museum
33	Old College Historic District	Old College Historic District	June 4, 1973 (#73000526)	Main and College Sts. on the University of Delaware campus 39°41′03″N 75°45′10″W	Newark	University of Delaware
34	Old First Presbyterian Church	Old First Presbyterian Church	May 7, 1982 (#82002347)	17 W. Main St. 39°40′58″N 75°45′17″W	Newark	University of Delaware
35	Old Newark Comprehensive School	Old Newark Comprehensive School	May 7, 1982 (#82002348)	83 E. Main St. 39°41′00″N 75°44′58″W	Newark	University of Delaware
36	Thomas Phillips Mill Complex	Thomas Phillips Mill Complex	August 19, 1983 (#83001403)	708 and 712 Nottingham Rd. 39°41′29″N 75°46′40″W	Newark	
37	Poplar Hall	Poplar Hall	January 26, 1988 (#87002434)	3176 Denny Rd. 39°33′22″N 75°46′28″W	Newark	
38	Rhodes Pharmacy	Rhodes Pharmacy	February 24, 1983 (#83001404)	36 E. Main St. 39°41′00″N 75°45′07″W	Newark	
39	Rotheram Mill House	Rotheram Mill House	January 4, 1972 (#72000287)	318 Harmony Rd. 39°41′49″N 75°41′40″W	Newark	
40	St. John the Baptist Roman Catholic Church	St. John the Baptist Roman Catholic Church	May 7, 1982 (#82002349)	200 E. Main St. 39°41′02″N 75°44′43″W	Newark	
41	St. Thomas Episcopal Church	St. Thomas Episcopal Church	May 7, 1982 (#82002350)	21 S. Main St. 39°40′56″N 75°45′24″W	Newark	University of Delaware
42	State Theater	State Theater	February 24, 1983 (#83001405)	39 E. Main St. 39°40′59″N 75°45′07″W	Newark	The State Theater was demolished in 1989.
43	J. Stinson Farm	J. Stinson Farm	November 13, 1986 (#86003080)	750 Corner Ketch Rd. 39°44′39″N 75°43′52″W	Newark	
44	John C. Vansant House	John C. Vansant House	February 16, 1989 (#89000007)	110 Possum Hollow Rd. 39°42′50″N 75°43′37″W	Newark	Tri-State Bird Rescue
45	R. Walker Barn	R. Walker Barn	November 13, 1986 (#86003082)	Rustic Ln. 39°44′16″N 75°41′47″W	Newark	
46	White Clay Creek Presbyterian Church	White Clay Creek Presbyterian Church	March 20, 1973 (#73000531)	1311 Capitol Trail; 39°41′56″N 75°42′36″W	Newark	
47	Wilmington Trust Company Bank	Wilmington Trust Company Bank	May 7, 1982 (#82002351)	82 E. Main St. 39°41′01″N 75°45′00″W	Newark	
48	Edward R. Wilson House	Edward R. Wilson House	April 25, 1983 (#83001408)	521 S. College Ave; 39°40′08″N 75°45′04″W	Newark	
49	Wright House	Wright House	May 7, 1982 (#82002352)	47 Kent Way; 39°40′44″N 75°45′21″W	Newark	University of Delaware president's house

== See also ==
- National Register of Historic Places listings in Delaware
- National Register of Historic Places listings in northern New Castle County, Delaware
- List of National Historic Landmarks in Delaware
