= Building at 34 Choate Street =

Historic house in Delaware, United States

- U.S. National Register of Historic Places
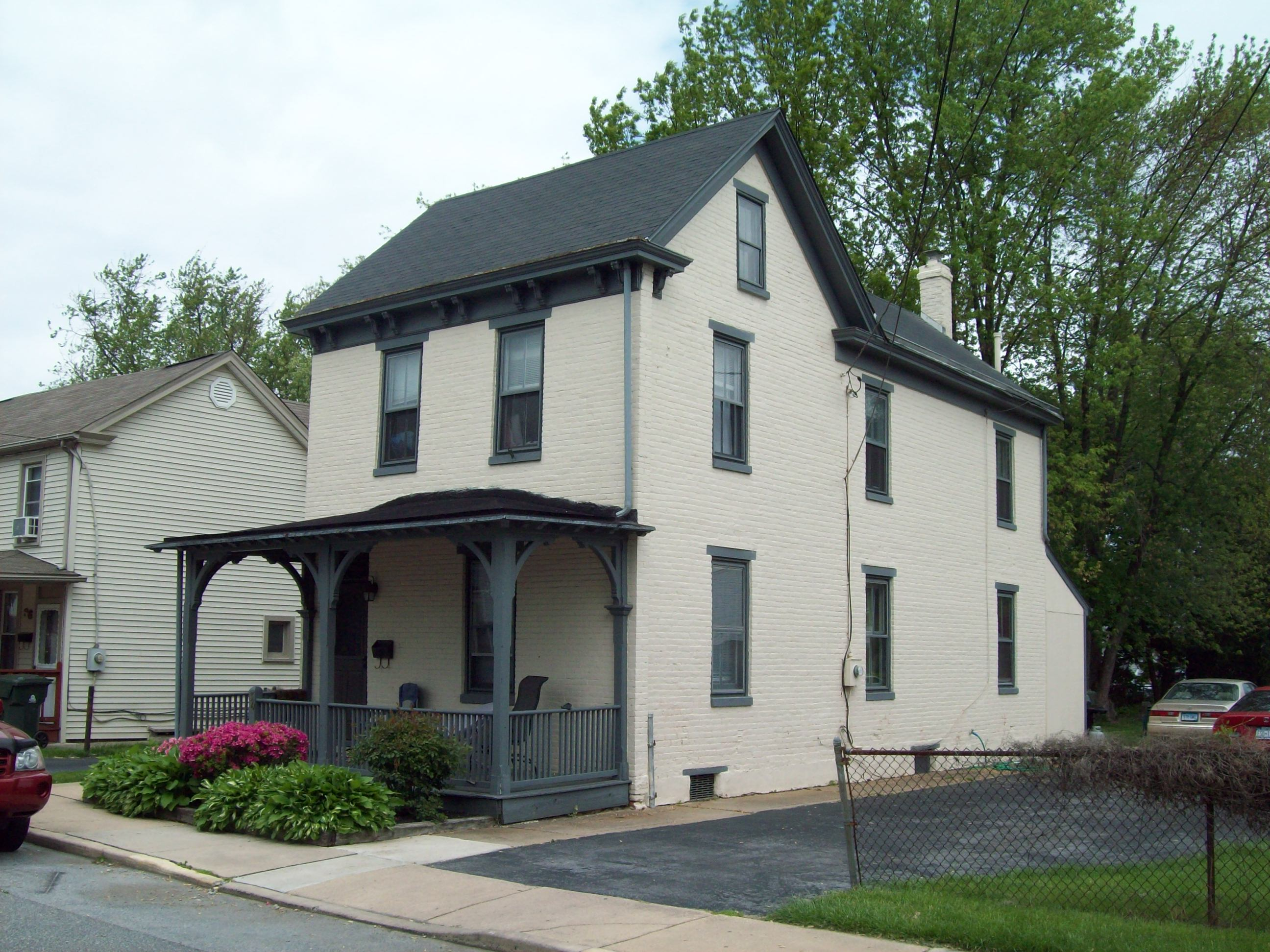
- Building at 34 Choate Street, April 2010

- Location within Delaware Location within the United States
- Location: 34 Choate St., Newark, Delaware
- Coordinates: 39.684776°N 75.746808°W
- Area: 0.2 acres (0.081 ha)
- Built: 1893
- MPS: Newark MRA
- NRHP reference No.: 83001387
- Added to NRHP: February 24, 1983

Building at 34 Choate Street is a historic home located at Newark in New Castle County, Delaware. It was built in 1893 and is a two-story, gable roofed brick single family residence with original trim and front porch still intact. It has a one-story, shed roofed frame rear wing.

It was added to the National Register of Historic Places in 1983.

== See also ==
- National Register of Historic Places listings in Newark, Delaware
