= White Clay Creek Presbyterian Church =

Historic church in Delaware, United States

- U.S. National Register of Historic Places
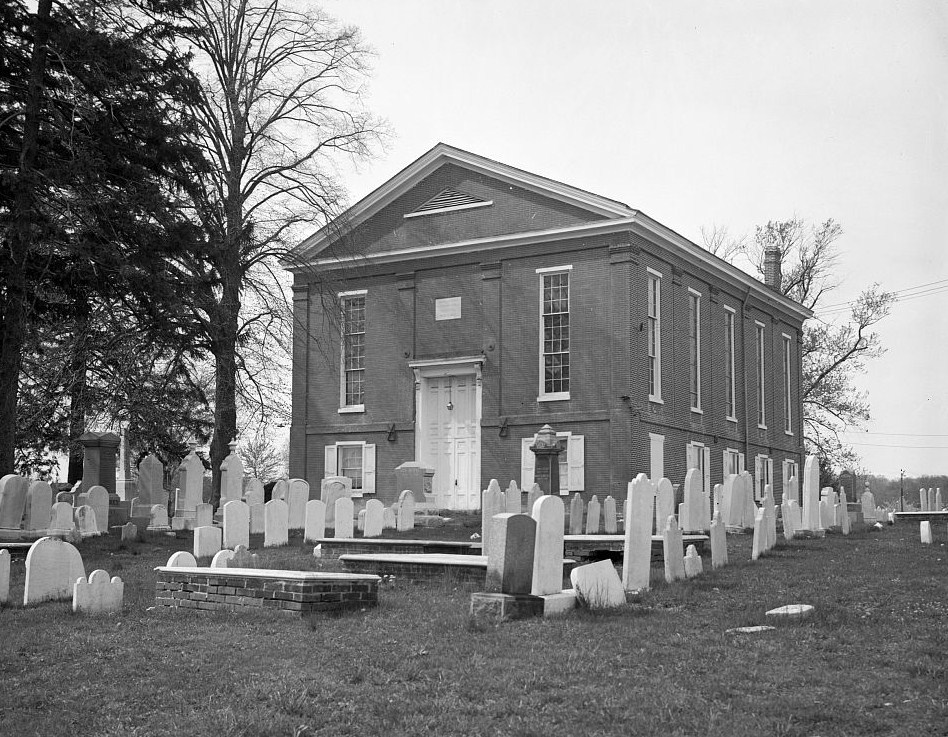
- White Clay Creek Presbyterian Church in 1958

- Location within Delaware Location within the United States
- Location: 15 Polly Drummond Hill Rd, Newark, Delaware
- Coordinates: 39.698841°N 75.709964°W
- Area: 1 acre (0.40 ha)
- Built: 1855
- NRHP reference No.: 73000531
- Added to NRHP: March 20, 1973

White Clay Creek Presbyterian Church is a historic Presbyterian church located near Newark, New Castle County, Delaware. The current structure was built in 1855, and is a two-story brick structure, nearly as tall (about 40 feet) as it is wide (45 feet). The building measures 63 feet deep. The exterior features brick pilasters and tall stained glass windows. A 1996 addition to the front of the building contains an elevator to the second floor sanctuary and is topped by a steeple. It was preceded by a structure built in 1752. The church was organized as early as 1709 to serve Scotch-Irish Presbyterians at White Clay Creek. The original White Clay Creek Presbyterian Church was built in 1721 about a mile north on the NW Corner of Dewalt Rd and Old Coach Rd.

It was added to the National Register of Historic Places in 1973.

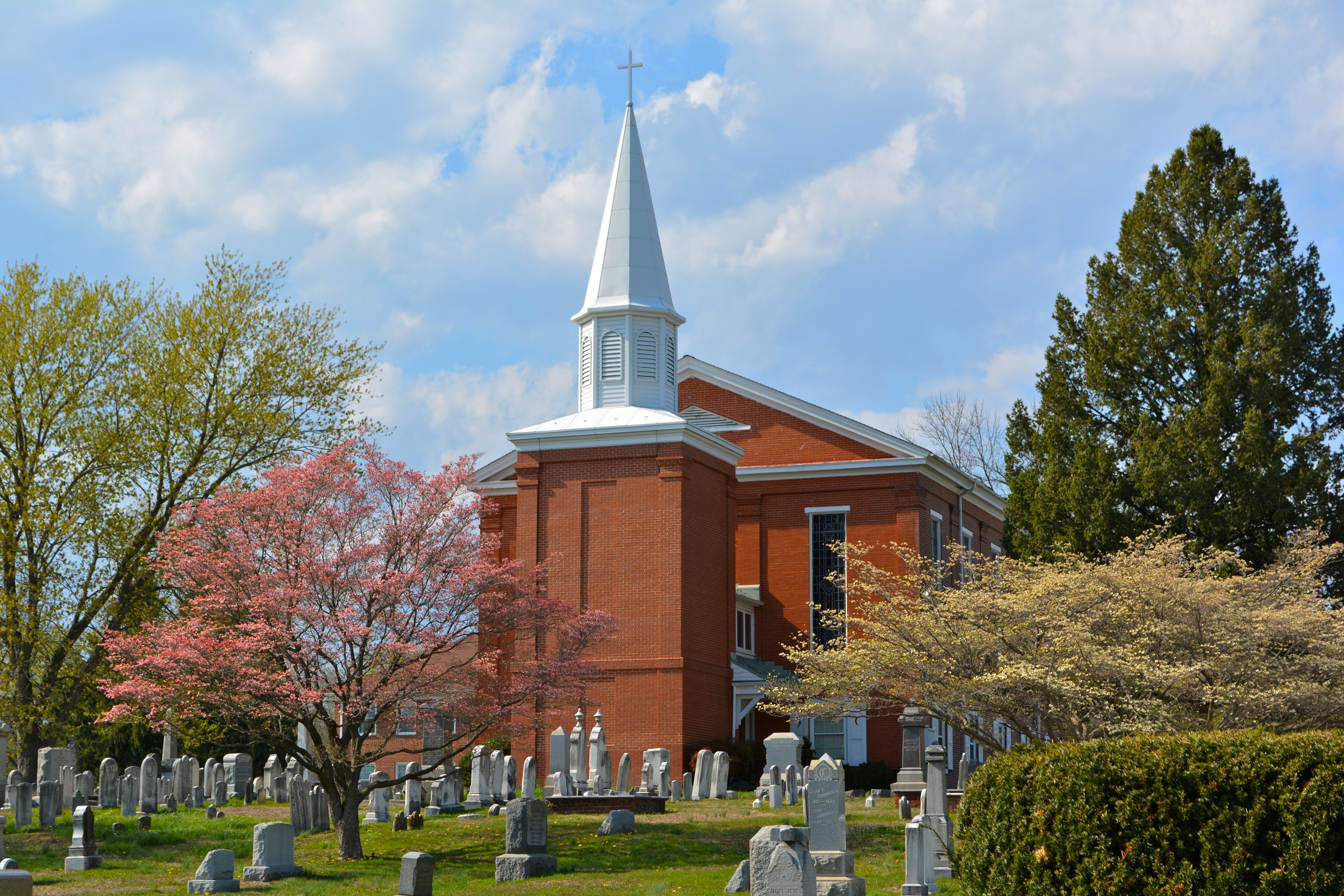
April, 2014

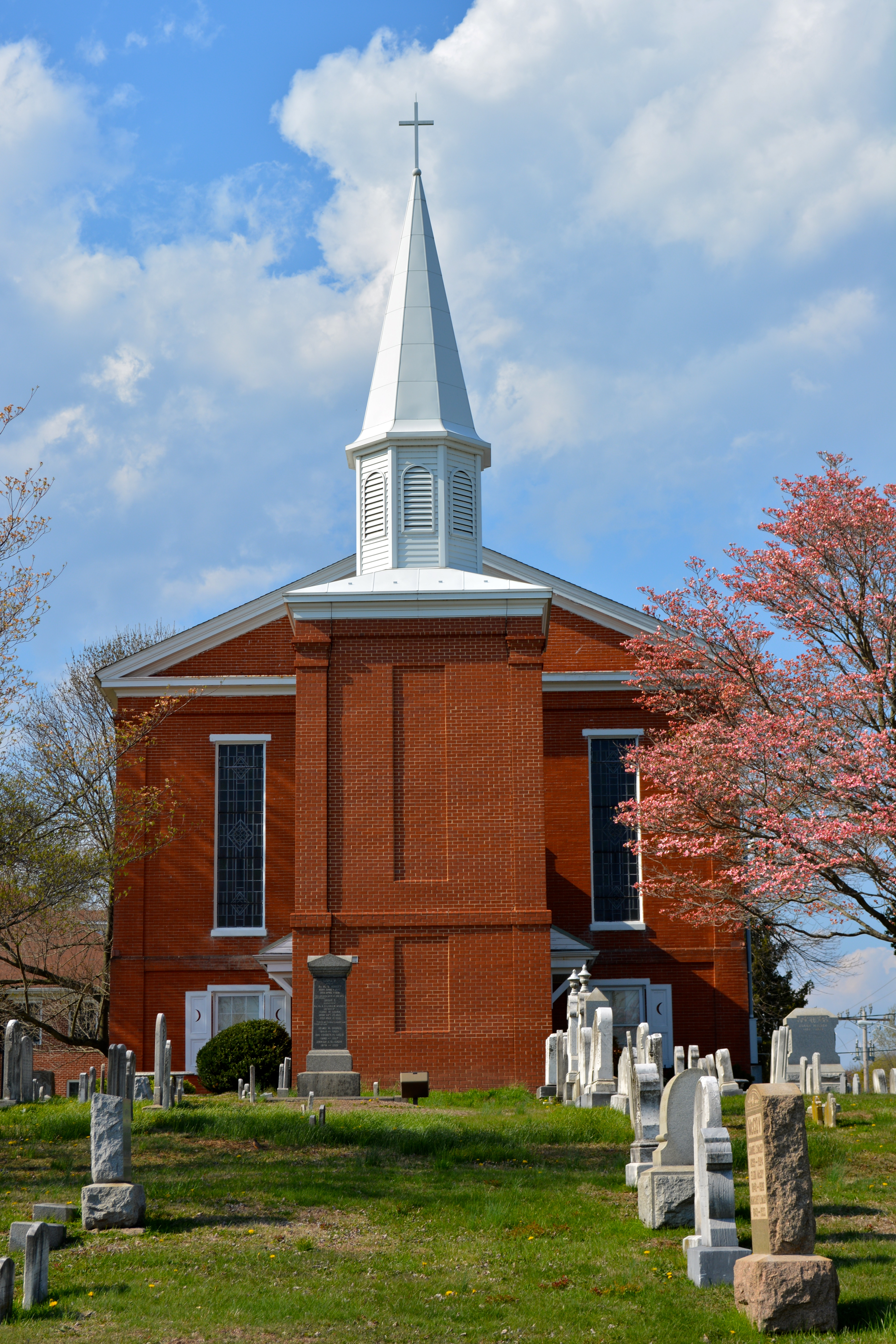

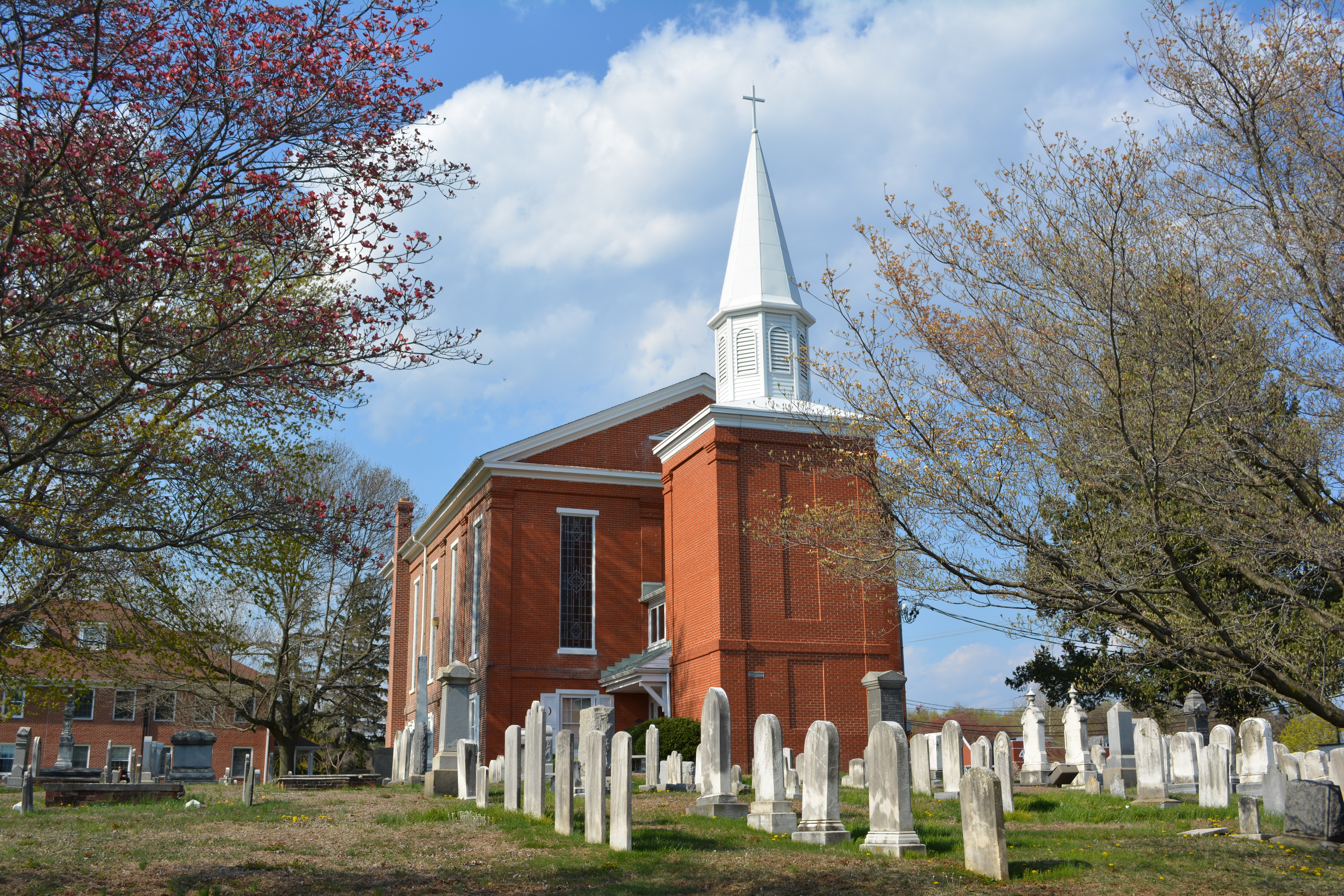

== See also ==
- National Register of Historic Places listings in Newark, Delaware
