= J. Stinson Farm =

- U.S. National Register of Historic Places
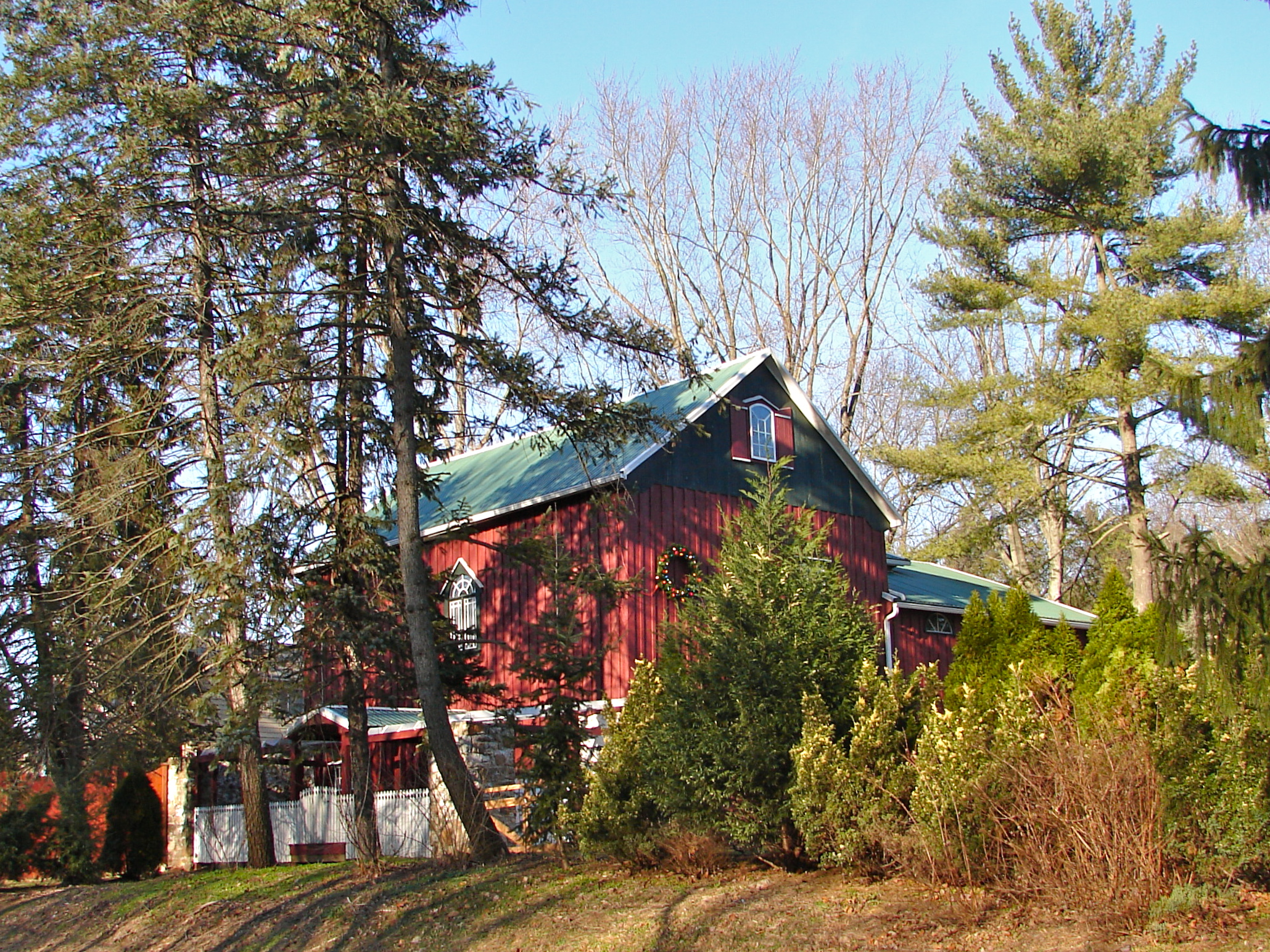
- J. Stinson Barn, December 2010

- Location within Delaware Location within the United States
- Location: 750 Corner Ketch Rd., near Newark, Delaware
- Coordinates: 39°44′39″N 75°43′52″W
- Area: 2.2 acres (0.89 ha)
- Built: 1810
- Architectural style: Georgian, Bi-level barn
- MPS: Agricultural Buildings and Complexes in Mill Creek Hundred, 1800-1840 TR
- NRHP reference No.: 86003080
- Added to NRHP: November 13, 1986

J. Stinson Farm is a historic farm located near Newark, New Castle County, Delaware. The property includes three contributing buildings. They are a stone and frame bank barn (c. 1810), an early 19th-century stuccoed masonry house with an addition dated to about 1900, and a late-19th century, frame implement shed. The house is a two-story, three-bay, gable-roofed, stuccoed stone building. It has a Georgian form and the addition has Queen Anne style detailing.

It was added to the National Register of Historic Places in 1986.

== See also ==
- National Register of Historic Places listings in Newark, Delaware
