= State Theater (Newark, Delaware) =

- U.S. National Register of Historic Places
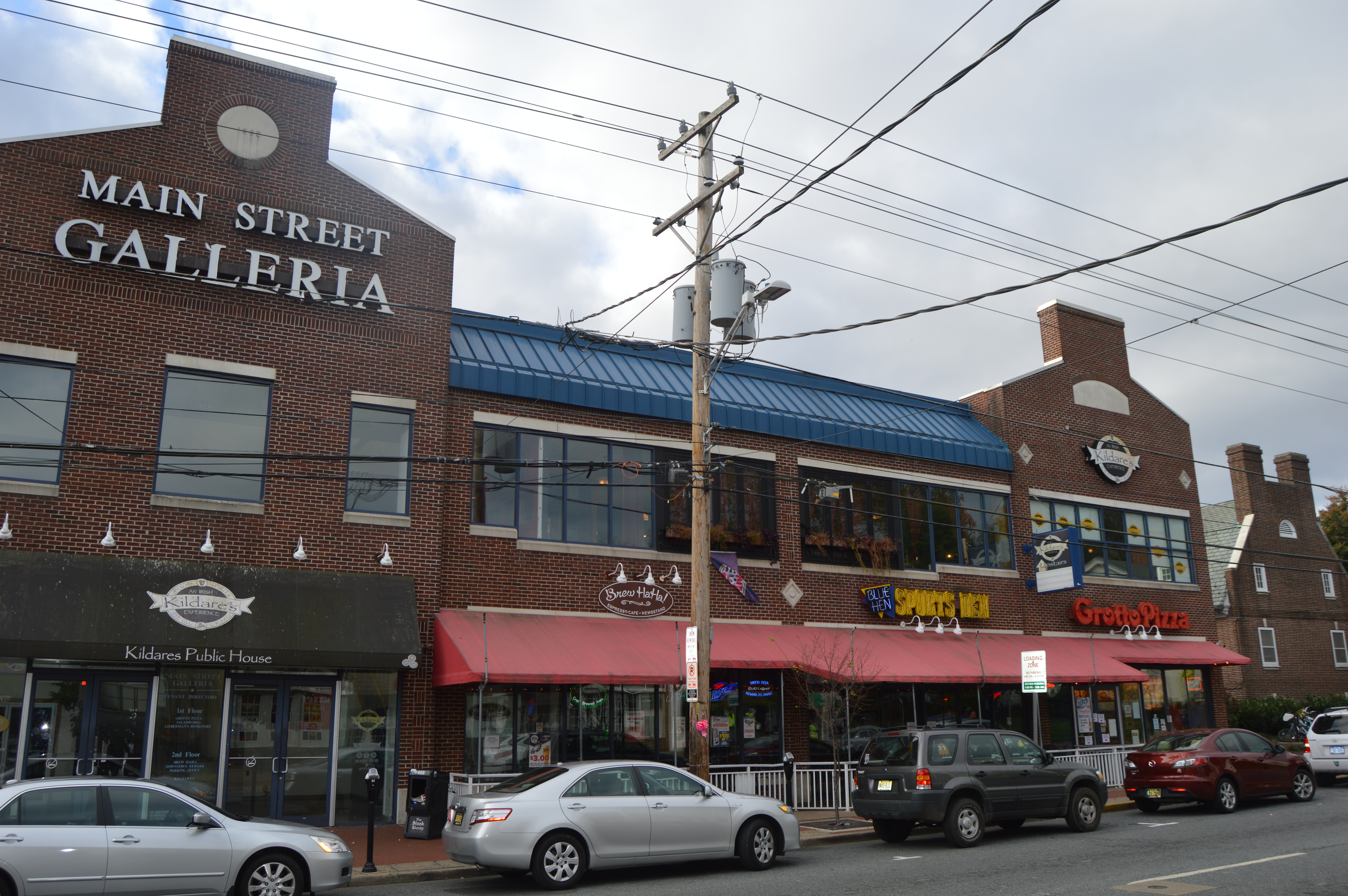
- Building occupying the theater's site

- Location within Delaware Location within the United States
- Location: 39 E. Main St., Newark, Delaware
- Coordinates: 39.683014°N 75.751905°W
- Area: 0.4 acres (0.16 ha)
- Built: 1929
- Architectural style: Classical Revival
- MPS: Newark MRA
- NRHP reference No.: 83001405
- Added to NRHP: February 24, 1983

State Theater was an historic theater located at Newark in New Castle County, Delaware. It was built about 1929 and was a Neoclassical style, rectangular brick structure with one of the narrow ends oriented toward the street. The theater occupied most of the building, with two small store spaces located at either end of the facade. It was closed near the end of the 1980s, and it was demolished in 1989.

It was added to the National Register of Historic Places in 1983.

== See also ==
- National Register of Historic Places listings in Newark, Delaware
