= Granite Mansion =

Historic house in Delaware, United States

- U.S. National Register of Historic Places
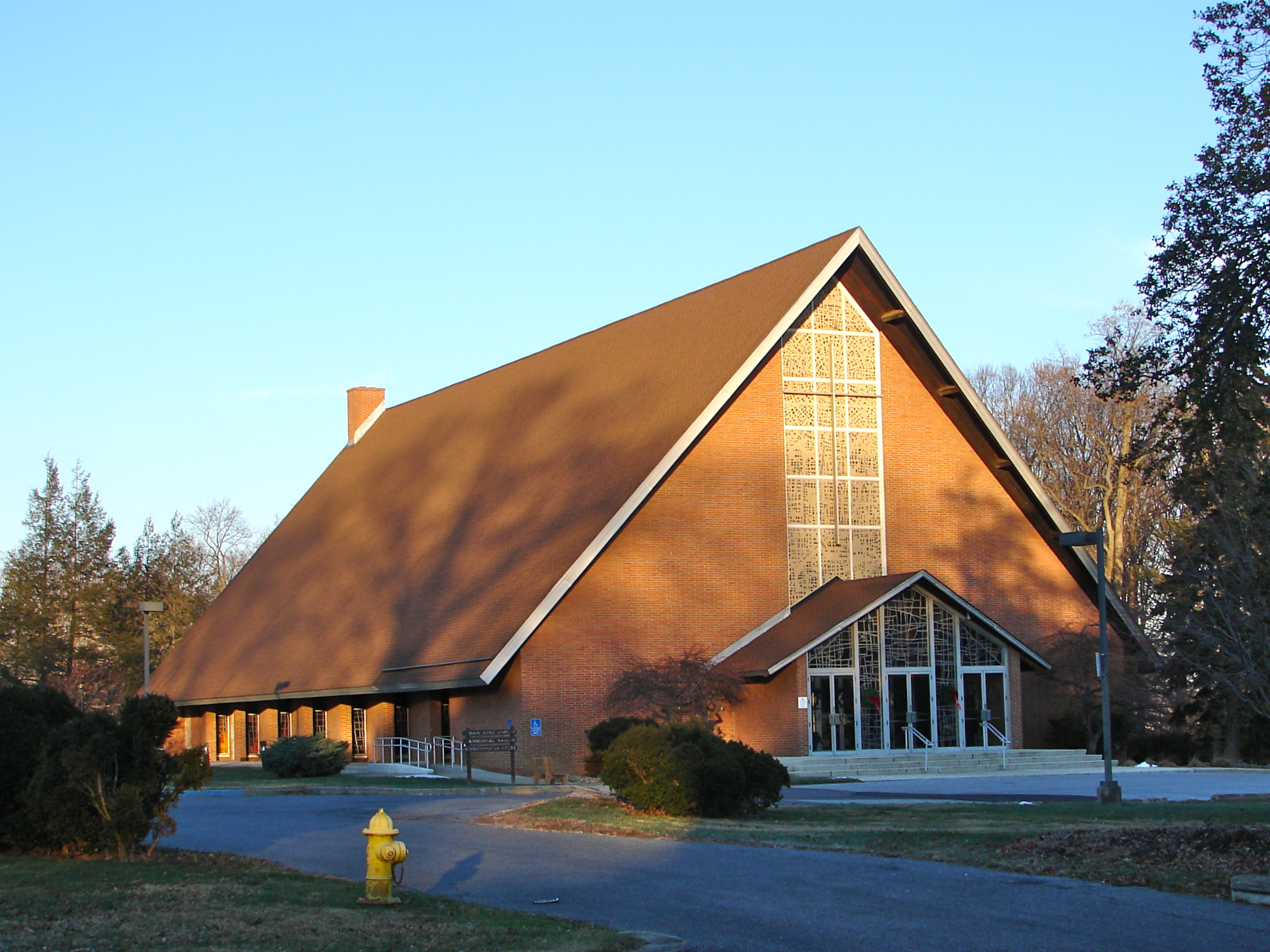
- Granite Mansion property, December 2010

- Location within Delaware Location within the United States
- Location: 292 W. Main St., Newark, Delaware
- Coordinates: 39.686336°N 75.763793°W
- Area: 0.3 acres (0.12 ha)
- Built: 1844
- Architect: Johnson, Isaac; Multiple
- Architectural style: Greek Revival
- MPS: Newark MRA
- NRHP reference No.: 83001394
- Added to NRHP: February 24, 1983

Granite Mansion was a historic home located at Newark in New Castle County, Delaware. It was built in 1844, and was a three-story, three-bay, cubic stuccoed stone building with a flat roof in the Greek Revival style. It had a rear kitchen wing. The house was renovated in 1924 in the Neoclassical style, to add a two-tiered Corinthian porch on the east elevation and a Doric Porte-Cochere on the west elevation. Also on the property were a small stuccoed spring house and one-and-a-half-story frame and stucco building dated to 1924. The house has been demolished and the property occupied by the First Presbyterian Church of Newark.

It was added to the National Register of Historic Places in 1983.

== See also ==
- National Register of Historic Places listings in Newark, Delaware
