= Rhodes Pharmacy =

- U.S. National Register of Historic Places
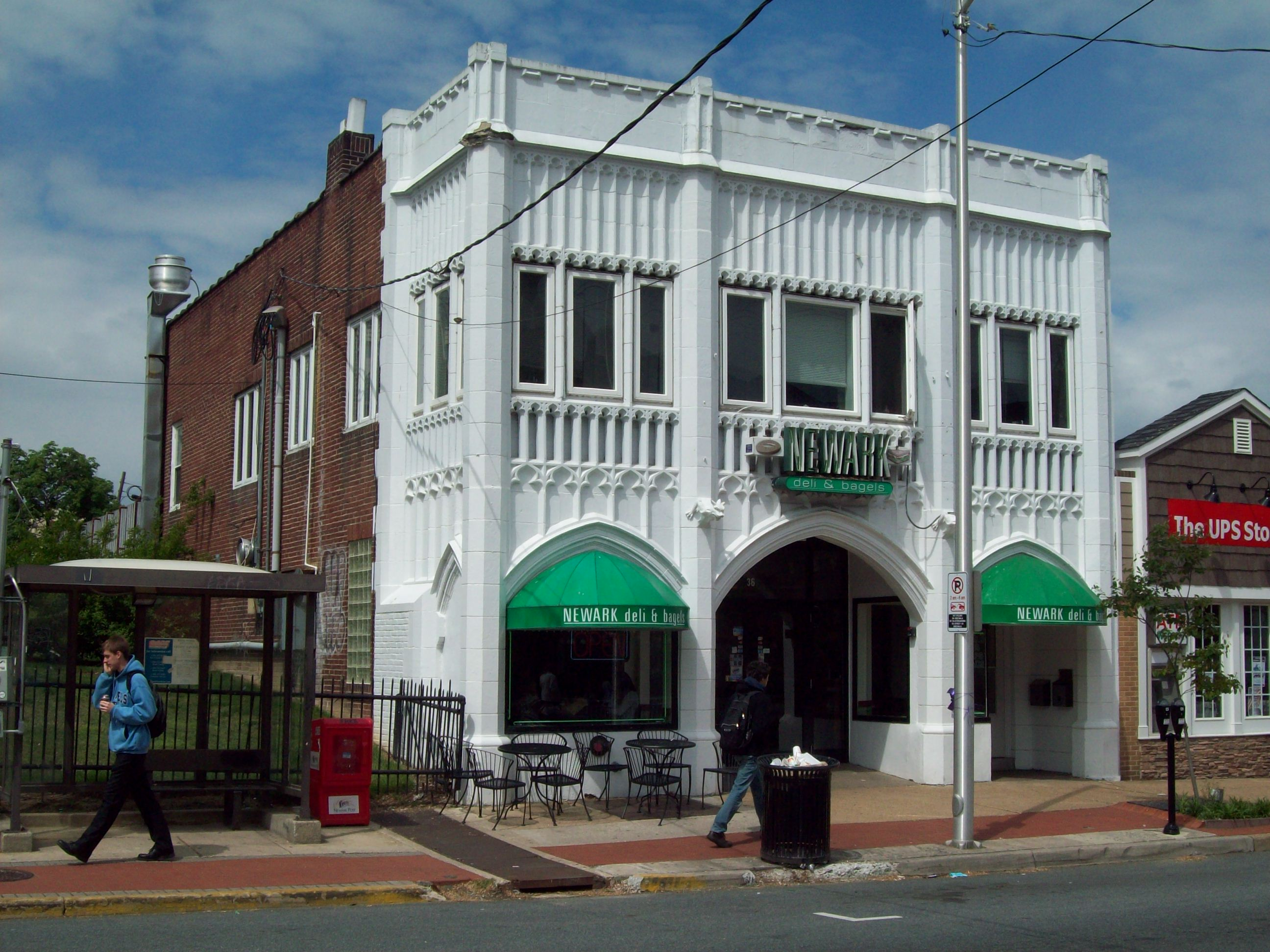
- Rhodes Pharmacy, April 2010

- Location within Delaware Location within the United States
- Location: 36 E. Main St., Newark, Delaware
- Coordinates: 39.683302°N 75.752056°W
- Area: 0.1 acres (0.040 ha)
- Built: 1917
- Architect: Whittingham, Richard A.
- Architectural style: Early Commercial, Gothic Revival
- MPS: Newark MRA
- NRHP reference No.: 83001404
- Added to NRHP: February 24, 1983

Rhodes Pharmacy is a historic pharmacy building located at Newark in New Castle County, Delaware. It was built in 1917 and is a two-story, rectangular brick commercial building with a concrete Gothic Revival facade.

It was added to the National Register of Historic Places in 1983.

== See also ==
- National Register of Historic Places listings in Newark, Delaware
