= Belmont Hall (Newark, Delaware) =

Historic house in Delaware, United States

- U.S. National Register of Historic Places
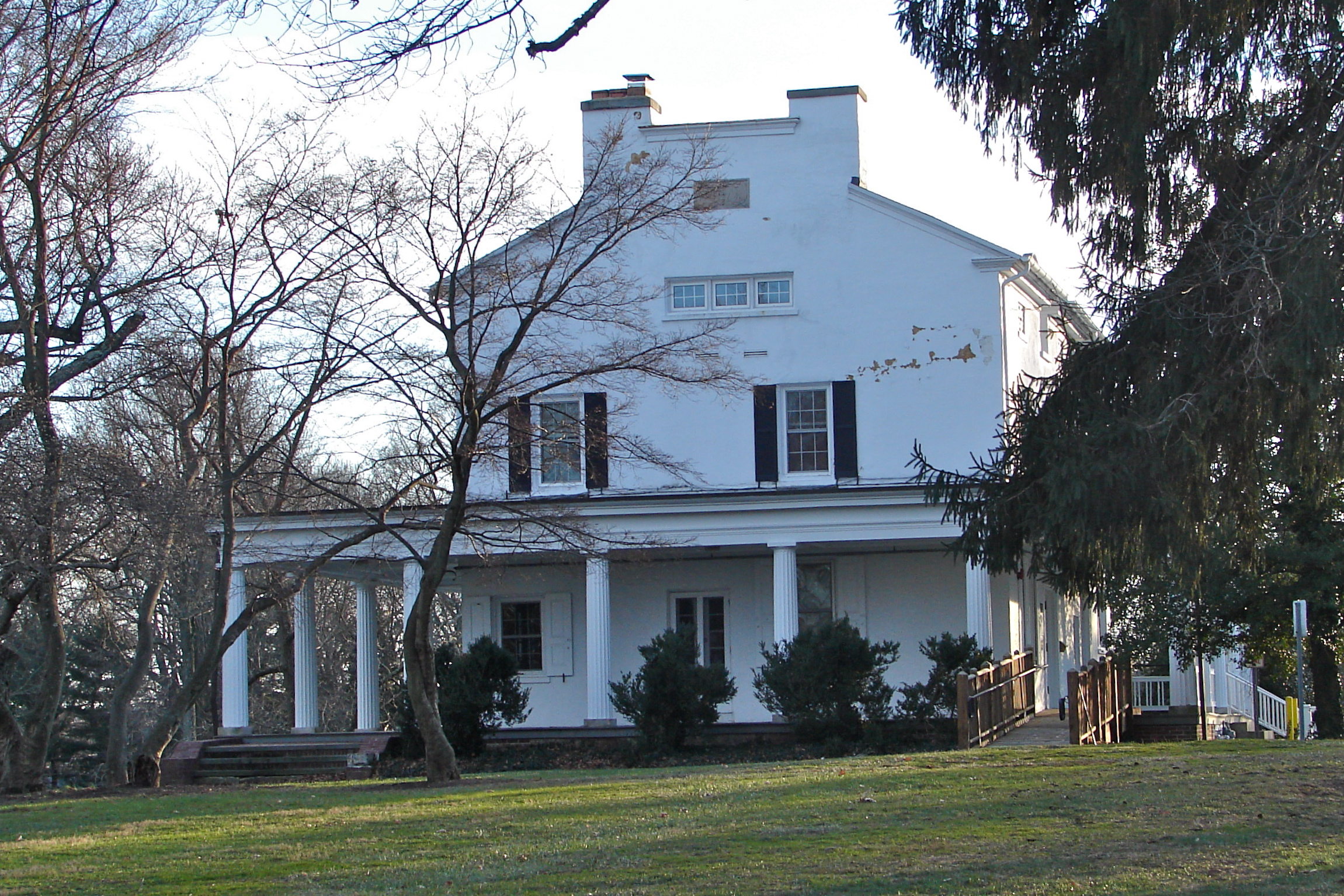
- Belmont Hall, December 2010

- Location within Delaware Location within the United States
- Location: 203 W. Main St., Newark, Delaware
- Coordinates: 39.683809°N 75.760755°W
- Area: 2.6 acres (1.1 ha)
- Built: 1838-1844
- MPS: Newark MRA
- NRHP reference No.: 83001386
- Added to NRHP: February 24, 1983

Belmont Hall is a historic home located at Newark in New Castle County, Delaware. It was built between 1838 and 1844 and is a 2 1/2-story, gable-roofed, stuccoed brick building. It features a porch on three sides supported by Doric order columns. The building was renovated in 1911 in the Classical Revival style. It was built as a private dwelling, In 1950, the University of Delaware purchased the building as a home for its president. It was later used as a dormitory for honor students.

It was added to the National Register of Historic Places in 1983.

== See also ==
- National Register of Historic Places listings in Newark, Delaware
