= Head of Christiana Presbyterian Church =

Historic church in Delaware, United States

- U.S. National Register of Historic Places
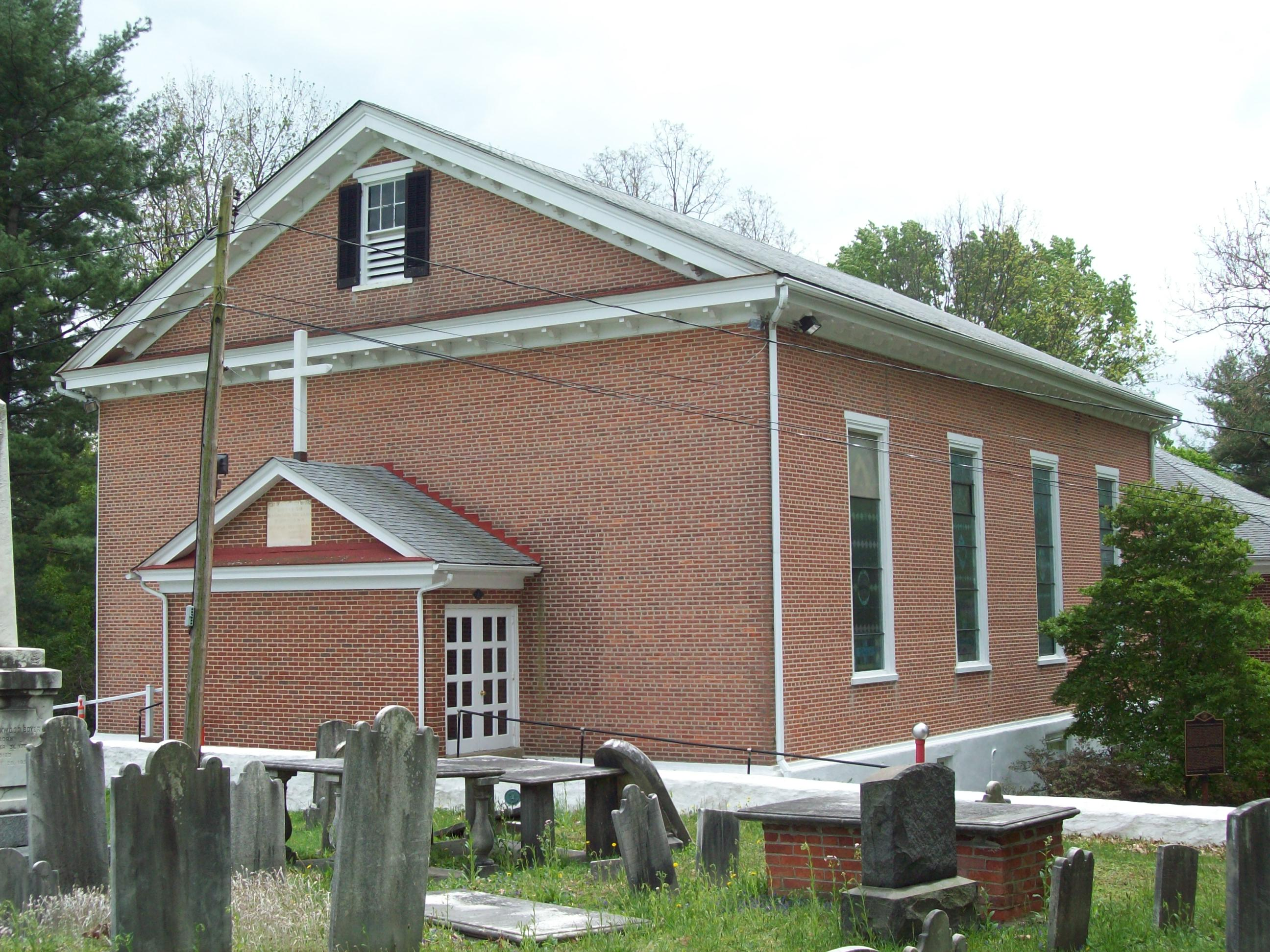
- Head of Christiana Presbyterian Church, April 2010

- Location within Delaware Location within the United States
- Location: 1100 Church Rd., Newark, Delaware
- Coordinates: 39°41′31″N 75°47′12″W
- Area: 6.2 acres (2.5 ha)
- Built: 1859
- MPS: White Clay Creek Hundred MRA
- NRHP reference No.: 83001343
- Added to NRHP: August 19, 1983

Head of Christiana Presbyterian Church is a historic Presbyterian church and cemetery at 1100 Church Road in Newark, Delaware. It was built in 1859 and is a one-story, four bay gable roofed brick building. Adjacent to the church is a four and a half acre church cemetery with burials dating back to the mid-18th century. The church congregation was established in 1708 by Scotch-Irish immigrants.

It was added to the National Register of Historic Places in 1983.
