= Poplar Hall (Newark, Delaware) =

- U.S. National Register of Historic Places
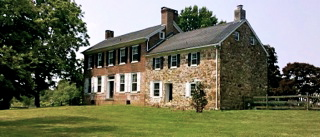

- Location within Delaware Location within the United States
- Location: 3176 Denny Rd., near Newark, Delaware
- Coordinates: 39.556066°N 75.774453°W
- Area: 21.9 acres (8.9 ha)
- Architectural style: Georgian, Vernacular Georgian, Greek Revival
- NRHP reference No.: 87002434
- Added to NRHP: January 26, 1988

Poplar Hall is a historic home and farm located near Newark, New Castle County, Delaware. The property includes six contributing buildings. They are an 18th-century brick dwelling with its stone wing and five associated outbuildings. The house is a 2 1/2-story, gable-roofed, brick structure with a 2 1/2-story, cobblestone, gable-roofed wing. It was substantially remodeled in the mid-19th century in the Greek Revival style. Also on the property are a contributing 2 1/2-story crib barn (c. 1850), frame smokehouse, frame dairy, implement shed, and cow barn.

It was added to the National Register of Historic Places on January 26, 1988. The farm later became a pumpkin patch.

== See also ==
- National Register of Historic Places listings in Newark, Delaware
