= Newbold House =

Newbold House may refer to:

- Taylor–Newbold House, listed on the NRHP in Burlington County, New Jersey
- Barzillai Newbold House, listed on the NRHP in Burlington County, New Jersey
- William and Susannah Newbold House, listed on the NRHP in Burlington County, New Jersey
- Newbold–White House, listed on the NRHP in Perquimans County, North Carolina

== See also ==
- Newbold Revel
