= Stokes House =

Stokes House may refer to:

- Stokes House (Evening Shade, Arkansas)
- Fremont Stokes House, Clarksville, Arkansas
- Taylor-Stokes House, Marcella, Arkansas
- Dr. Ella Stokes House, Oskaloosa, Iowa
- Stokes Castle, Austin, Nevada
- Stokes–Lee House, Collingswood, New Jersey
- Stokes–Evans House, Marlton, New Jersey
- Charles Stokes House, Willingboro Township, New Jersey
- Benjamin A. Stokes House, Lebanon, Ohio, listed on the NRHP in Warren County
- Francis Marion Stokes Fourplex, Portland, Oregon
- Stokes-Mayfield House, Rock Hill, South Carolina
- Oliver O. Stokes House, Harding, South Dakota
