= Thomas Hollinshead House =

- U.S. National Register of Historic Places
- New Jersey Register of Historic Places
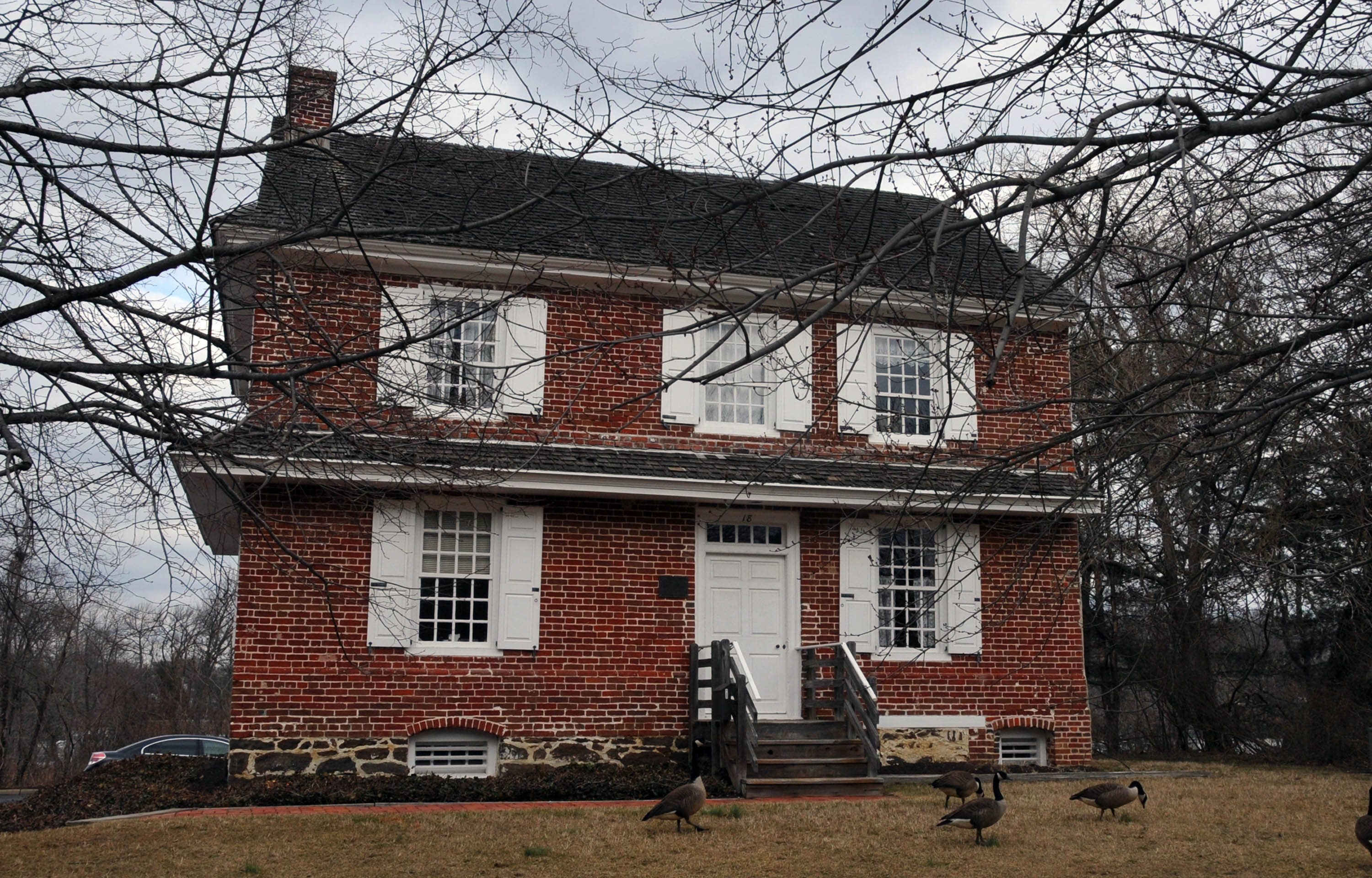

- Location within Burlington County, New Jersey Location within New Jersey Location within the United States
- Location: 18 West Stow Road, Marlton, New Jersey
- Coordinates: 39°54′47″N 74°55′26″W
- Built: 1776
- Architectural style: Georgian, Delaware Valley Vernacular
- MPS: Historic Resources of Evesham Township MPDF
- NRHP reference No.: 92000977
- NJRHP No.: 804

Significant dates
- Added to NRHP: August 14, 1992
- Designated NJRHP: June 25, 1992

The Thomas Hollinshead House, also known as the Eves House and the Stow House, is located at 18 West Stow Road near the Marlton section of Evesham Township in Burlington County, New Jersey, United States. The historic Georgian house was built in 1776 and was added to the National Register of Historic Places on August 14, 1992, for its significance in architecture. It was listed as part of the Historic Resources of Evesham Township, New Jersey, Multiple Property Submission (MPS).

The two and one-half story brick house was built in 1776 by Thomas Hollinshead, on land his grandfather, Thomas Eves, gave to him. According to the multiple property submission, it is possibly the oldest known surviving house in the township. During the American Revolutionary War, British soldiers leaving Philadelphia encamped here on the night of June 19, 1778.

== See also ==
- National Register of Historic Places listings in Burlington County, New Jersey
