= Ivins–Conover House =

- U.S. National Register of Historic Places
- New Jersey Register of Historic Places
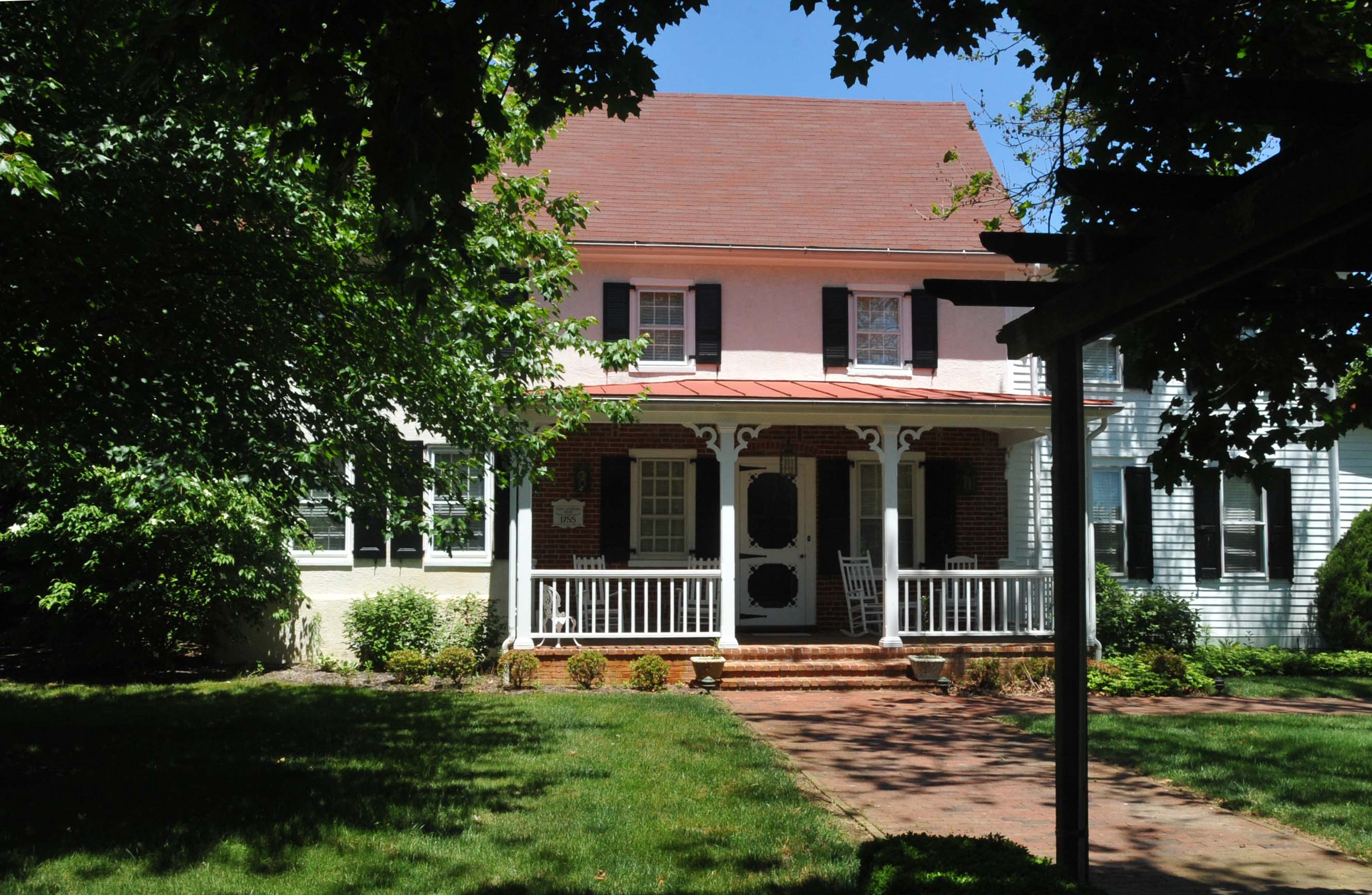

- Location within Burlington County, New Jersey Location within New Jersey Location within the United States
- Location: Cox Road, east of Hartford Road, Moorestown, New Jersey
- Coordinates: 40°00′10″N 74°55′07″W
- Area: 3 acres (1.2 ha)
- Built: 1775
- Built by: Samuel Ivins; William Ivins
- Architectural style: Georgian
- NRHP reference No.: 77000852
- NJRHP No.: 834

Significant dates
- Added to NRHP: April 29, 1977
- Designated NJRHP: January 7, 1976

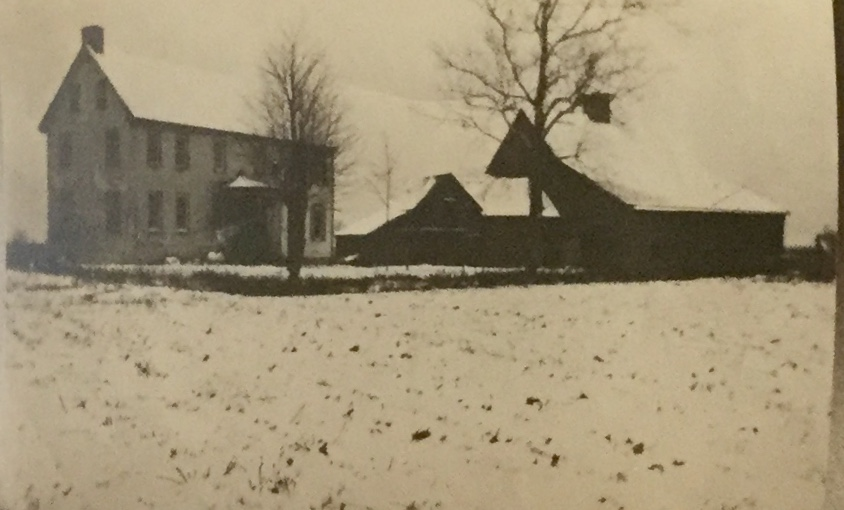
Ivins-Conover house and barn

The Ivins–Conover House is a historic Quaker farmhouse located on Cox Road, east of Hartford Road, in the township of Moorestown in Burlington County, New Jersey, United States. The oldest section was built in 1775 by Samuel and William Ivins. The house was added to the National Register of Historic Places on April 29, 1977, for its significance in architecture.

The two-story brick house was expanded in 1820 and 1905. According to the nomination form, the Ivins family lived here from 1775 to 1831 and the Conover family lived here from 1853 to 1926.

== See also ==
- National Register of Historic Places listings in Burlington County, New Jersey
