= Willingboro School House =

- U.S. National Register of Historic Places
- New Jersey Register of Historic Places
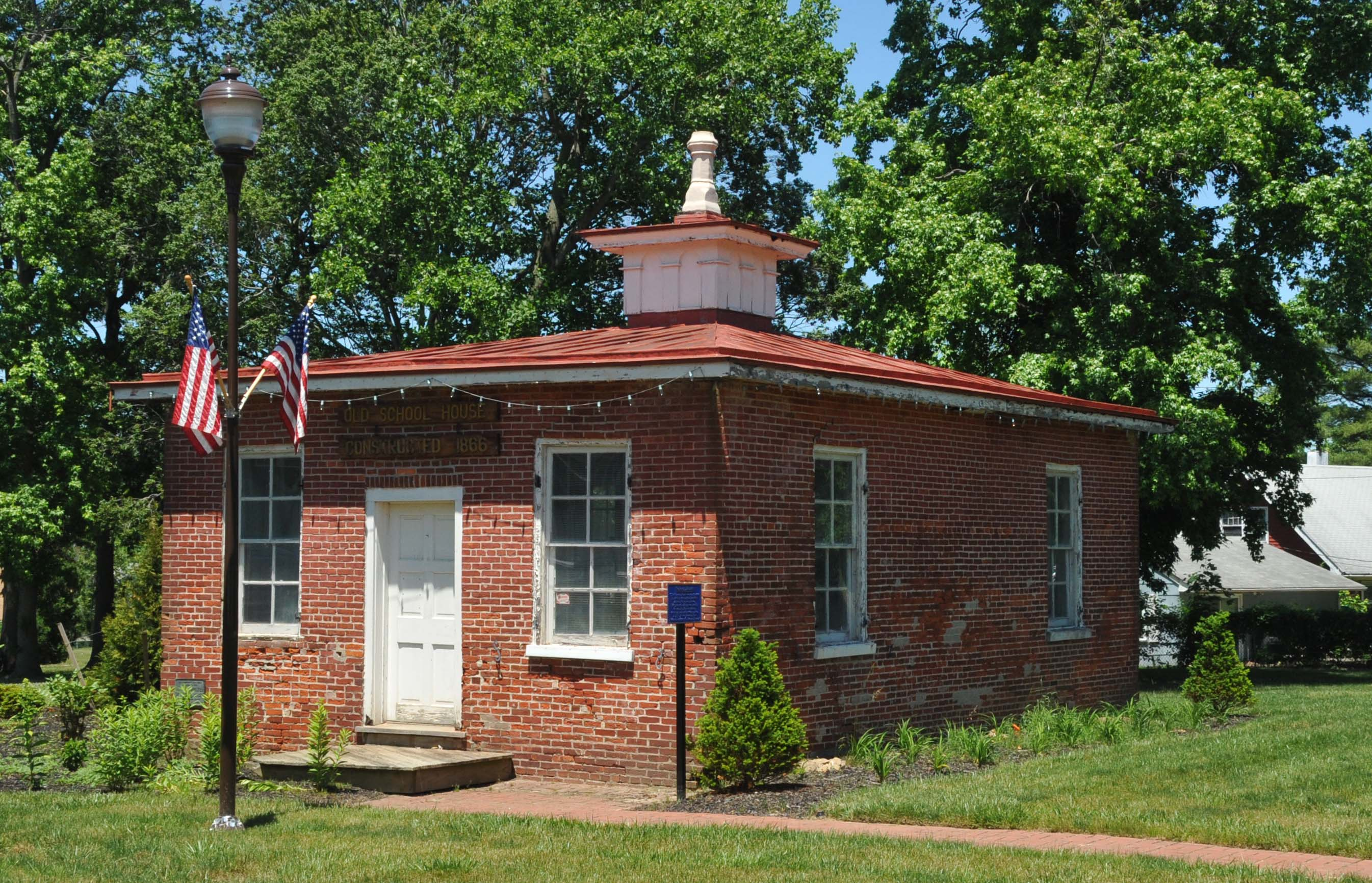

- Location within Burlington County, New Jersey Location within New Jersey Location within the United States
- Location: Salem Road, Willingboro Township, New Jersey
- Coordinates: 40°01′50.6″N 74°53′44.1″W
- Built: 1866
- NRHP reference No.: 75001123
- NJRHP No.: 881

Significant dates
- Added to NRHP: April 21, 1975
- Designated NJRHP: November 26, 1973

The Willingboro School House is a historic one-room schoolhouse located on Salem Road in Willingboro Township in Burlington County, New Jersey, United States. Built in 1866, the brick building was added to the National Register of Historic Places on April 21, 1975, for its significance in education and politics/government. After the school closed in the 1920s, it was used as the town hall and community meeting place.

== See also ==
- National Register of Historic Places listings in Burlington County, New Jersey
