= Main Street Friends Meeting House =

- U.S. National Register of Historic Places
- New Jersey Register of Historic Places
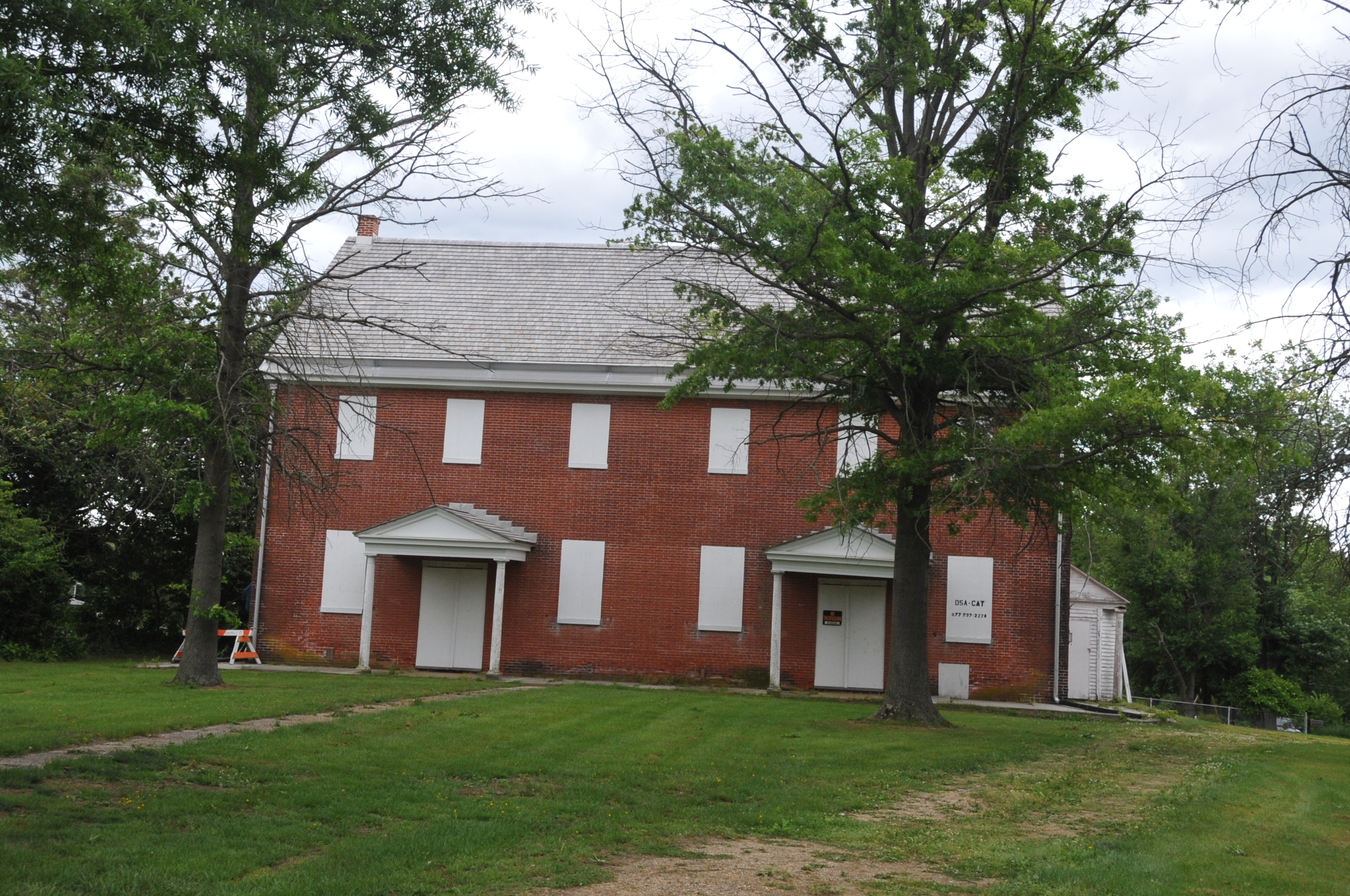

- Location within Burlington County, New Jersey Location within New Jersey Location within the United States
- Location: 19 South Street, Medford, New Jersey
- Coordinates: 39°53′51″N 74°49′19.8″W
- Built: 1843
- NRHP reference No.: 11000589
- NJRHP No.: 4348

Significant dates
- Added to NRHP: August 24, 2011
- Designated NJRHP: June 2, 2011

The Main Street Friends Meeting House, also known as the Medford Hicksite Meeting House, is a historic Quaker meeting house located in the township of Medford in Burlington County, New Jersey, United States. It was built from 1842 to 1843 by the Hicksite Sect of the Medford Friends. The brick building was added to the National Register of Historic Places on August 24, 2011, for its significance in architecture.

== History and description ==
The Society of Friends in Medford, then known as Upper Evesham, was organized in 1759. They built a new meeting house in 1814. The Friends split into two branches in 1827, Orthodox and Hicksite, followers of Elias Hicks. In 1823, the Hicksite sect in Medford built a new meeting house, now known as the Main Street Friends Meeting House, matching the 1814 building. It is a two-story brick building featuring modest architecture and a simple interior. In 1955, the two groups reunited, named Medford United Monthly Meeting.

The Medford Friends Hicksite Cemetery adjoins the property to the northeast.

== See also ==
- National Register of Historic Places listings in Burlington County, New Jersey
