= Moorestown Friends School and Meetinghouse =

Historic church in New Jersey, United States

- U.S. National Register of Historic Places
- New Jersey Register of Historic Places
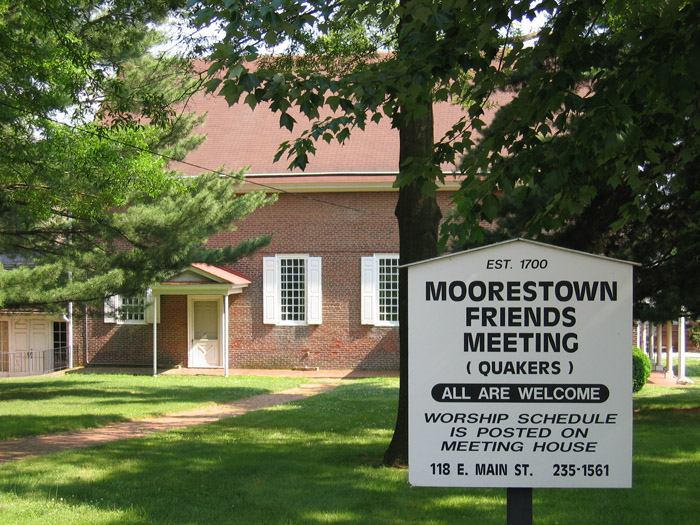
- The welcome sign in front of the meeting house

- Location within Burlington County, New Jersey Location within New Jersey Location within the United States
- Location: Main Street at Chester Avenue, Moorestown Township, New Jersey
- Coordinates: 39°57′49″N 74°56′30″W
- Area: 40 acres (16 ha)
- Built: 1802
- Architectural style: Colonial Revival, Georgian Revival
- NRHP reference No.: 86003796
- NJRHP No.: 837

Significant dates
- Added to NRHP: July 22, 1988
- Designated NJRHP: June 16, 1986

Moorestown Friends School and Meetinghouse is a historic Quaker school and meeting house on Main Street at Chester Avenue in Moorestown Township, Burlington County, New Jersey, United States. The Friends Meeting hosts Quaker worship every Sunday in the meetinghouse, as well as a variety of events, including Christmas Eve meetings for worship and youth activities.

The meetinghouse was built in 1802 and added to the National Register of Historic Places in 1988.

== See also ==
- National Register of Historic Places listings in Burlington County, New Jersey
