= Amos Evans House =

- U.S. National Register of Historic Places
- New Jersey Register of Historic Places
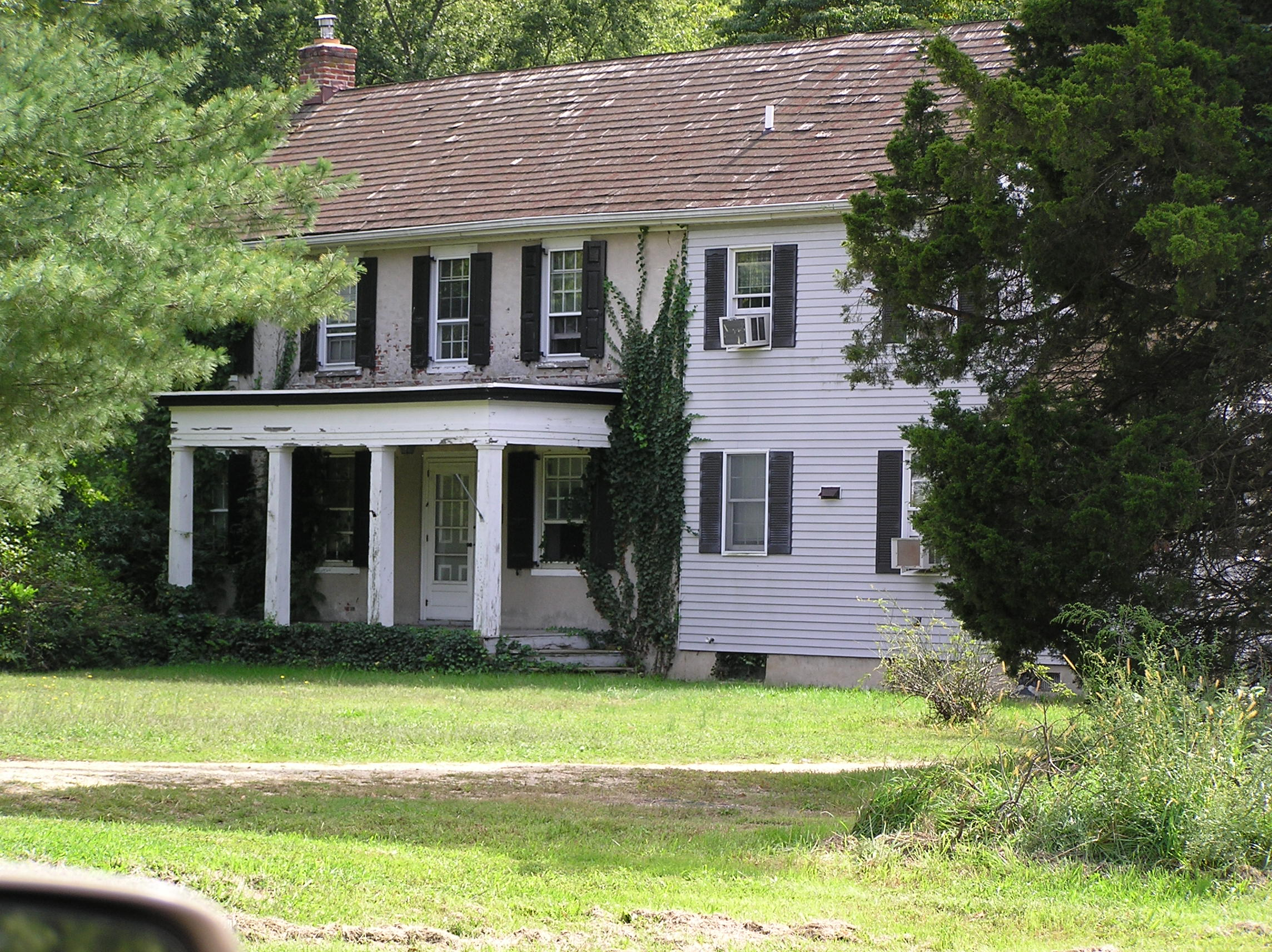

- Location within Burlington County, New Jersey Location within New Jersey Location within the United States
- Location: 501 East Main Street, Marlton, New Jersey
- Coordinates: 39°53′05″N 74°53′49″W
- Area: 3.3 acres (1.3 ha)
- Built: 1785
- Architectural style: Federal, Georgian
- MPS: Historic Resources of Evesham Township MPDF
- NRHP reference No.: 94001008
- NJRHP No.: 797

Significant dates
- Added to NRHP: September 2, 1994
- Designated NJRHP: June 28, 1994

The Amos Evans House is located at 501 East Main Street near the Marlton section of Evesham Township in Burlington County, New Jersey, United States. The oldest part of the house was built in 1785. The historic brick house was added to the National Register of Historic Places on September 2, 1994, for its significance in architecture. It was listed as part of the Historic Resources of Evesham Township, New Jersey, Multiple Property Submission (MPS).

According to the nomination form, the first house built here was for William Evans around 1740. The current house was built for Enoch Evans in 1785. Amos Evans inherited it in 1839 and expanded the house with Federal and Georgian architectural features in 1840. The property also includes a frame shed and a windmill, which is said to be the only one surviving in the township.

== See also ==
- National Register of Historic Places listings in Burlington County, New Jersey
