= William R. Allen School =

- U.S. National Register of Historic Places
- New Jersey Register of Historic Places
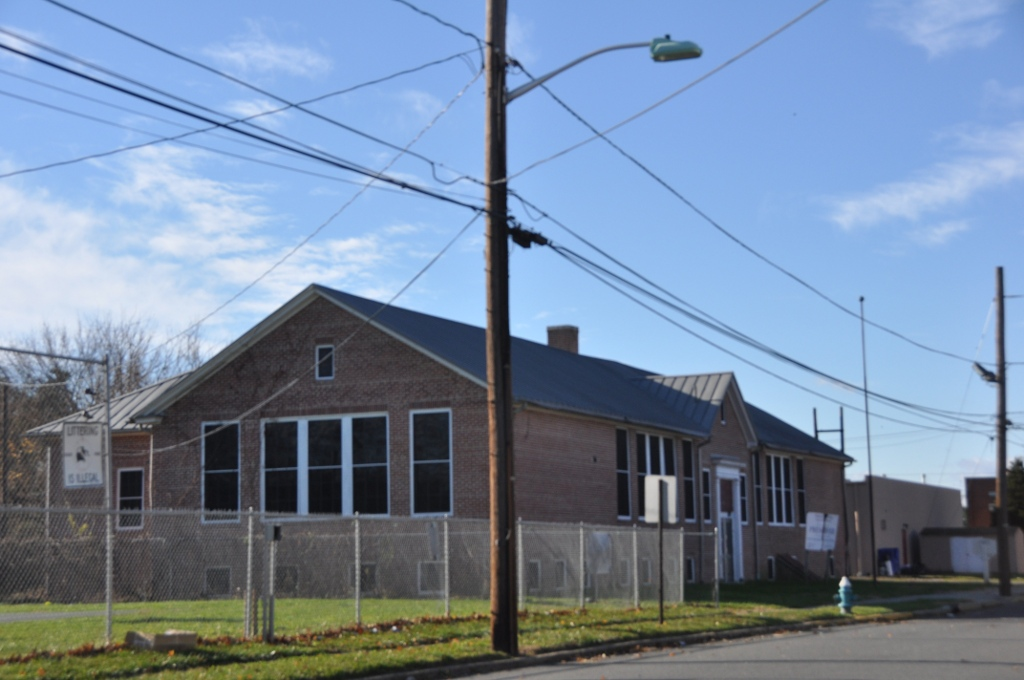

- Location within Burlington County, New Jersey Location within New Jersey Location within the United States
- Location: Junction of Mitchell Avenue and E. Federal Street, Burlington, New Jersey
- Coordinates: 40°04′26″N 74°51′05″W
- Area: 4 acres (1.6 ha)
- Built: 1900
- Architectural style: Colonial Revival
- NRHP reference No.: 90001450
- NJRHP No.: 755

Significant dates
- Added to NRHP: August 8, 1991
- Designated NJRHP: August 10, 1990

The William R. Allen School is located on Mitchell Avenue in the city of Burlington in Burlington County, New Jersey, United States. The historic brick schoolhouse was built in 1900 and was added to the National Register of Historic Places on August 8, 1991, for its significance in education and social history.

== See also ==
- National Register of Historic Places listings in Burlington County, New Jersey
