= National Register of Historic Places listings in Burlington County, New Jersey =

Location of Burlington County in New Jersey

Contents: Counties and communities in New Jersey
Atlantic – Bergen (Closter, Franklin Lakes, Ridgewood, Saddle River, Wyckoff) – Burlington – Camden – Cape May – Cumberland – Essex – Gloucester – Hudson – Hunterdon – Mercer – Middlesex – Monmouth – Morris – Ocean – Passaic – Salem – Somerset – Sussex – Union – Warren

Burlington County, New Jersey, has 100 properties and districts listed on the National Register of Historic Places.

Latitude and longitude coordinates of the sites listed on this page may be displayed in an online map.

This National Park Service list is complete through NPS recent listings posted November 6, 2026.

	Name on the Register	Image	Date listed	Location	City or town	Description
1	Abbott Farm Archeological Site	Abbott Farm Archeological Site	December 8, 1976 (#76001158)	Hamilton-Trenton-Bordentown Marsh, other nearby public and private lands 40°11′10″N 74°43′37″W	Bordentown and Bordentown Township	Extends into Mercer County.
2	William R. Allen School	William R. Allen School	August 8, 1991 (#90001450)	Junction of Mitchell Avenue and East Federal Street; 40°04′26″N 74°51′05″W	Burlington	
3	Arney's Mount Friends Meetinghouse and Burial Ground	Arney's Mount Friends Meetinghouse and Burial Ground	January 18, 1973 (#73001083)	Junction of Mount Holly-Juliustown and Pemberton-Arney's Mount Roads; 40°00′33″N 74°41′50″W	Arney's Mount	
4	Arneytown Historic District	Arneytown Historic District	December 12, 1977 (#67451850)	Province Line Road (Ellisdale-Arneytown Road) and Chesterfield-Arneytown Road; 40°06′07″N 74°34′07″W	Arneytown	Extends into Monmouth County
5	Atsion Village	Atsion Village	October 22, 1974 (#74001154)	US 206; 39°44′27″N 74°43′29″W	Atsion	Includes Atsion Mansion
6	Batsto Village	Batsto Village	September 10, 1971 (#71000495)	10 miles (16 km) east of Hammonton on CR 542; 39°38′28″N 74°38′49″W	Batsto Village	
7	Bead Wreck Site	Bead Wreck Site	October 18, 1988 (#88001899)	Address Restricted	New Gretna	
8	Beverly National Cemetery	Beverly National Cemetery	October 15, 1997 (#97001201)	Bridgeboro Road, junction of Mt. Holly, and Bridgeboro Roads; 40°03′16″N 74°55′14″W	Edgewater Park Township	
9	Birmingham School	Birmingham School	December 31, 1992 (#92001683)	Birmingham Road, north of North Branch Rancocas Creek; 39°58′47″N 74°42′40″W	Birmingham	Destroyed by fire in July 1993
10	Bishop–Irick Farmstead	Bishop–Irick Farmstead	August 4, 1992 (#92000975)	17 Pemberton Road; 39°56′23″N 74°44′44″W	Vincentown	
11	Bordentown Historic District	Bordentown Historic District	June 14, 1982 (#82003264)	In an irregular pattern within the city limits 40°08′47″N 74°42′41″W	Bordentown	Boundary increase 2014-09-03.
12	Breidenhart	Breidenhart	December 22, 1977 (#77000851)	255 East Main Street; 39°58′09″N 74°56′08″W	Moorestown Township	
13	J. F. Budd Baby Shoe Factory	J. F. Budd Baby Shoe Factory	December 13, 2000 (#00001525)	231 Penn Avenue; 40°04′51″N 74°51′15″W	Burlington	
14	Burlington County Prison	Burlington County Prison	June 24, 1986 (#86003558)	High Street; 39°59′47″N 74°47′23″W	Mount Holly Township	
15	Burlington Historic District	Burlington Historic District	March 13, 1975 (#75001124)	Roughly L-shaped, bounded by the Delaware River and High, West Broad, Talbot, and Reed Streets; 40°04′43″N 74°51′50″W	Burlington	
16	Burlington's Lost Burial Ground	Burlington's Lost Burial Ground	November 26, 2004 (#04001260)	Address Restricted; 40°04′44″N 74°51′37″W	Burlington	
17	Buzby's General Store	Buzby's General Store	March 25, 2004 (#04000222)	3959 CR 563; 39°49′09″N 74°32′08″W	Woodland Township	
18	Chesterford School	Chesterford School	December 23, 2009 (#09001155)	415 W. Main St. 39°57′19″N 75°00′32″W	Maple Shade	
19	Cinnaminson Avenue and Spring Garden Street Schools	Cinnaminson Avenue and Spring Garden Street Schools	May 29, 1992 (#92000635)	Spring Garden Street between Cinnaminson and Parry Avenues; 39°59′49″N 75°01′15″W	Palmyra	
20	Isaac Collins House	Isaac Collins House	July 24, 1992 (#92000926)	201 Broad Street; 40°04′42″N 74°52′01″W	Burlington	
21	Benjamin Cooper Farm	Benjamin Cooper Farm	December 12, 1978 (#78001744)	Address Restricted	Moorestown Township	Known also as Savich Farm, no buildings on site.
22	Coopertown Meetinghouse	Coopertown Meetinghouse	May 22, 1978 (#78001750)	Cooper Street at US Route 130, Cooperstown; 40°02′52″N 74°54′15″W	Edgewater Park Township	
23	Cropwell Friends Meeting House	Cropwell Friends Meeting House	August 14, 1992 (#92000976)	810 Cropwell Road; 39°53′36″N 74°55′32″W	Evesham Township	Part of the Historic Resources of Evesham Township Multiple Property Submission (MPS)
24	Crosswicks Historic District	Crosswicks Historic District	May 3, 1976 (#76001146)	Roughly bounded by Bordentown-Crosswicks and Ellisdale Roads; 40°09′07″N 74°38′47″W	Crosswicks	
25	Crosswicks Creek Site III	Crosswicks Creek Site III	November 26, 1990 (#87001795)	Address Restricted	Bordentown	Extends into Mercer County
26	Eayres Plantation and Mill Site	Eayres Plantation and Mill Site	August 13, 1986 (#86001501)	Eayrestown-Red Lion and East Bella Bridge Roads; 39°56′48″N 74°47′41″W	Lumberton Township	
27	Amos Evans House	Amos Evans House	September 2, 1994 (#94001008)	501 East Main Street, Marlton; 39°53′05″N 74°53′49″W	Evesham Township	Part of the Historic Resources of Evesham Township MPS
28	William and Susan Evans House	William and Susan Evans House	August 14, 1992 (#92000978)	2 Bill's Lane, Marlton; 39°52′24″N 74°54′12″W	Evesham Township	Part of the Historic Resources of Evesham Township MPS
29	Evans–Cooper House	Evans–Cooper House	August 26, 1993 (#93000868)	North Elmwood Road between NJ 70 and Marlton Pike, Pine Grove; 39°53′22″N 74°53′07″W	Evesham Township	Part of the Historic Resources of Evesham Township MPS
30	Thomas and Mary Evens House	Thomas and Mary Evens House	August 26, 1993 (#93000867)	South Elmwood Road, Pine Grove; 39°52′51″N 74°53′19″W	Evesham Township	
31	Evesham Friends Meeting House	Evesham Friends Meeting House	April 22, 1982 (#82003268)	Moorestown-Mt. Laurel and Hainesport-Mt. Laurel Roads (Evesboro Road); 39°56′05″N 74°53′32″W	Mount Laurel Township	
32	Farmer's Hall	Farmer's Hall	August 1, 1979 (#79003248)	Moorestown-Mt. Laurel and Hainesport-Mt. Laurel Roads (Evesboro Road); 39°56′02″N 74°53′32″W	Mount Laurel Township	
33	Fenwick Manor	Fenwick Manor	October 25, 1990 (#90001549)	15 Springfield Road; 39°57′53″N 74°37′44″W	Pemberton Township	
34	Fernbrook Historic District	Fernbrook Historic District	July 7, 2022 (#100007873)	142-150 Bordentown-Georgetown Road; 40°06′14″N 74°40′37″W	Chesterfield Township	Known as Fernbrook Farms
35	Florence Public School No. 1	Florence Public School No. 1	June 8, 2015 (#15000321)	203 W. 2nd St. 40°07′19″N 74°48′27″W	Florence Township	
36	Thomas French Jr. House	Thomas French Jr. House	January 9, 1978 (#78001745)	512 Camden Avenue; 39°57′29″N 74°58′00″W	Moorestown Township	
37	Gen. Edward S. Godfrey House	Gen. Edward S. Godfrey House	February 28, 1997 (#97000064)	27 Main Street; 40°02′50″N 74°33′52″W	Cookstown	
38	Green Hill Farm	Green Hill Farm	July 8, 1982 (#82003265)	Oxmead and Deacon Roads; 40°02′43″N 74°48′54″W	Burlington Township	
39	Jonathan Haines House	Jonathan Haines House	June 16, 1976 (#76001147)	Fostertown Road, north of Church Road; 39°55′24″N 74°48′32″W	Medford	Also known as Friendship Farm
40	Hanover Furnace	Hanover Furnace	March 1, 1974 (#74001155)	Address Restricted	Browns Mills	
41	High Street Historic District	High Street Historic District	December 15, 1993 (#93001386)	Roughly, High Street from Pearl Street to Federal Street; 6 West Pearl Street; 40°04′38″N 74°51′31″W	Burlington	Boundary increased 8/25/14.
42	Thomas Hollinshead House	Thomas Hollinshead House	August 14, 1992 (#92000977)	18 West Stow Road, Marlton; 39°54′47″N 74°55′26″W	Evesham Township	Part of the Historic Resources of Evesham Township MPS
43	James and Charles B. Holloway Farm Complex	James and Charles B. Holloway Farm Complex	July 8, 1982 (#82003266)	Newbold Lane; 40°06′47″N 74°38′59″W	Chesterfield Township	
44	Francis Hopkinson House	Francis Hopkinson House	July 17, 1971 (#71000496)	101 Farnsworth Avenue at Park Avenue; 40°08′54″N 74°42′50″W	Bordentown	
45	John Inskeep Homestead	John Inskeep Homestead	August 26, 1993 (#93000866)	70 North Locust Ave; 39°53′50″N 74°55′00″W	Marlton	Part of the Historic Resources of Evesham Township MPS
46	John Irick House	John Irick House	September 16, 1977 (#77000849)	East of Burlington, off of the New Jersey Turnpike, Jacksonville; 40°03′02″N 74°45′48″W	Springfield Township	
47	Ivins–Conover House	Ivins–Conover House	April 29, 1977 (#77000852)	North of Moorestown off U.S. 130 on Cox Road; 40°00′10″N 74°55′07″W	Moorestown Township	
48	Jacob's Chapel A.M.E. Church	Jacob's Chapel A.M.E. Church	November 10, 2015 (#13000137)	311-313 Elbo Ln. 39°55′47″N 74°53′07″W	Mount Laurel vicinity	
49	Benjamin Jones House	Benjamin Jones House	November 30, 1982 (#82001042)	Pemberton-Browns Mills Road; 39°58′12″N 74°37′31″W	Pemberton	
50	Kirby's Mill	Kirby's Mill	August 12, 1971 (#71000497)	Northeast of Medford at Church and Fostertown Roads; 39°55′00″N 74°48′22″W	Medford	
51	Log Cabin Lodge	Log Cabin Lodge	April 12, 1982 (#82003267)	Stokes and Tabernacle Roads; 39°51′49″N 74°48′21″W	Medford Lakes	Burned down in 1998, photo is of replacement building
52	Main Street Friends Meeting House	Main Street Friends Meeting House	August 24, 2011 (#11000589)	19 South Street; 39°53′51″N 74°49′20″W	Medford	Also known as the Medford Hicksite Meeting House
53	Moorestown Friends School and Meetinghouse	Moorestown Friends School and Meetinghouse	July 22, 1988 (#86003796)	Main Street at Chester Avenue; 39°57′49″N 74°56′30″W	Moorestown Township	
54	Moorestown Historic District	Moorestown Historic District	August 30, 1990 (#89002295)	Roughly bounded by Maple Avenue, Chestnust Avenue, Main Street from Zelley Avenue to Locust Street, and Mill Street; 39°57′58″N 74°56′13″W	Moorestown Township	
55	Morris Mansion and Mill	Morris Mansion and Mill	September 13, 1977 (#77000855)	Hanover Street; 39°58′15″N 74°41′04″W	Pemberton	
56	Mount Holly Historic District	Mount Holly Historic District	February 20, 1973 (#73001084)	Roughly bounded by Prospect, Elm and Top-E-Toy Streets, railroad tracks, Madison and Clifton Avenues; 39°59′37″N 74°47′16″W	Mount Holly Township	
57	New Jersey Manual Training and Industrial School for Colored Youth	New Jersey Manual Training and Industrial School for Colored Youth	January 5, 1998 (#97001563)	North of Burlington Road, west of I-295; 40°08′29″N 74°43′25″W	Bordentown	
58	New St. Mary's Episcopal Church	New St. Mary's Episcopal Church	May 31, 1972 (#72000770)	North side of Broad Street between Talbot and Wood Streets; 40°04′37″N 74°51′43″W	Burlington	
59	Barzillai Newbold House	Barzillai Newbold House	January 26, 1978 (#78001749)	East of Columbus on Columbus-Georgetown Road; 40°03′56″N 74°40′02″W	Mansfield Township	
60	William and Susannah Newbold House	William and Susannah Newbold House	September 29, 1980 (#80002472)	Corner of Herman Black and Sykesville roads, east of Georgetown; 40°04′54″N 74°37′38″W	Chesterfield Township	
61	North Pemberton Railroad Station	North Pemberton Railroad Station	May 23, 1978 (#78001746)	Hanover Street; 39°58′36″N 74°40′54″W	Pemberton	1892-built former Pennsylvania Railroad station
62	Oakwood	Oakwood	January 30, 1978 (#78001751)	West of Wrightstown on Springfield Meeting Road; 40°03′07″N 74°38′21″W	Springfield Township	Destroyed by fire July 20, 2002
63	Old Schoolhouse	Old Schoolhouse	November 26, 2008 (#08001108)	35 Brainerd Street; 39°59′41″N 74°47′12″W	Mount Holly Township	
64	Alice Paul Birthplace	Alice Paul Birthplace	July 5, 1989 (#89000774)	128 Hooton Road; 39°57′24″N 74°55′50″W	Mount Laurel Township	Also known as Paulsdale
65	Peachfield	Peachfield	June 19, 1973 (#73001085)	180 Burrs Road, north of Mount Holly; 40°02′06″N 74°48′09″W	Westampton	
66	Pearson-How, Cooper, and Lawrence Houses	Pearson-How, Cooper, and Lawrence Houses	April 26, 1978 (#78001743)	453–459 High Street; 40°04′33″N 74°51′27″W	Burlington	
67	Pemberton Historic District	Pemberton Historic District	March 22, 1989 (#88000688)	Roughly bounded by Budd Avenue, Budd's Run, Egbert and Cedar Road, and Rancocas Creek and NJ Central Power and Light Company; 39°58′12″N 74°41′01″W	Pemberton	Includes Morris Mansion and Mill
68	Perkins House	Perkins House	September 15, 1977 (#77000853)	Camden Avenue and King's Highway; 39°57′34″N 74°57′32″W	Moorestown Township	
69	Philadelphia Watch Case Company Building	Philadelphia Watch Case Company Building	January 31, 1978 (#78001747)	Pavilion and Lafayette Avenues; 40°02′24″N 74°57′34″W	Riverside Township	
70	Point Breeze	Point Breeze	August 10, 1977 (#77000848)	US 206 and Park Street; 40°09′22″N 74°42′30″W	Bordentown	Former estate of Joseph Bonaparte
71	The Protestant Community Church of Medford Lakes	The Protestant Community Church of Medford Lakes	July 3, 2017 (#100001263)	100 Stokes Road; 39°51′44″N 74°48′20″W	Medford Lakes	Also known as the Cathedral of the Woods
72	Providence Presbyterian Church of Bustleton	Providence Presbyterian Church of Bustleton	November 18, 1988 (#87000377)	Junction of Old York and Burlington-Bustleton Roads; 40°05′16″N 74°47′02″W	Roebling	
73	Quaker School	Quaker School	December 31, 1974 (#74001156)	York and Penn Streets; 40°04′48″N 74°51′22″W	Burlington	
74	Rancocas Historic Village	Rancocas Historic Village	June 5, 1975 (#75001126)	Irregular pattern bounded north and west by Willingboro line, east to Springside Road and south to 3rd Street; 40°00′37″N 74°52′01″W	Rancocas	
75	Recklesstown Historic District	Recklesstown Historic District	August 19, 1975 (#75001125)	Present town of Chesterfield along Chesterfield-Georgetown Road and CR 528; 40°06′49″N 74°38′15″W	Chesterfield	
76	Red Dragon Canoe Club	Red Dragon Canoe Club	February 2, 2001 (#01000041)	221 Edgewater Avenue; 40°04′11″N 74°53′53″W	Edgewater Park Township	
77	William Ridgway House	William Ridgway House	January 11, 2019 (#100003304)	149 Juliustown Road; 40°00′45″N 74°42′31″W	Springfield Township	
78	Riverton Historic District	Riverton Historic District	March 5, 1999 (#99000271)	Roughly bounded by the Delaware River, Park Avenue, Thomas Avenue, and Fulton Street; 40°00′33″N 75°00′50″W	Riverton	
79	Roebling Historic District	Roebling Historic District	May 22, 1978 (#78001748)	Roughly bounded by Roebling Park, South Street, 2nd and 8th Avenues, Roland Street, Alden, Norman Railroad, and Amboy Avenue; 40°07′01″N 74°46′30″W	Roebling	
80	Rosebud Farm	Rosebud Farm	August 17, 1979 (#79003249)	East of Jobstown on Springfield Meetinghouse Road; 40°02′19″N 74°39′42″W	Jobstown	
81	Shamong Hotel	Shamong Hotel	September 13, 1979 (#79001477)	Main Street; 39°49′05″N 74°32′08″W	Chatsworth	
82	Singleton-Lathem-Large House	Singleton-Lathem-Large House	March 7, 1979 (#79001478)	Northwest of Chesterfield on CR 528; 40°08′33″N 74°40′46″W	Chesterfield Township	
83	Smith Mansion	Smith Mansion	October 22, 1976 (#76001148)	12 High Street; 39°57′46″N 74°56′51″W	Moorestown Township	Also known as the Smith–Cadbury Mansion
84	Thomas Smith House	Thomas Smith House	September 27, 1990 (#90001437)	1645 Hainesport-Mt. Laurel Road; 39°55′08″N 74°54′58″W	Mount Laurel Township	
85	Smithville Historic District	Smithville Historic District	May 12, 1977 (#77000856)	Smithville Rd., Forest, Railroad, Park, and Maple Aves., River St., and Smithville Lake; 39°58′57″N 74°45′04″W	Smithville	
86	St. Mary of the Lakes Catholic Church	St. Mary of the Lakes Catholic Church	April 27, 2007 (#07000357)	108 Stokes Road; 39°51′45″N 74°48′19″W	Medford Lakes	
87	St. Stephens Episcopal Church	St. Stephens Episcopal Church	November 25, 1999 (#99001363)	158 Warren Street; 40°03′52″N 74°55′01″W	Beverly City	
88	Springside Public School	Springside Public School	March 17, 2015 (#15000091)	1508 Mount Holly Rd. 40°03′27″N 74°50′51″W	Burlington Township	
89	Dr. James Still Office	Dr. James Still Office	November 3, 1995 (#95001190)	209 Church Road; 39°54′56″N 74°49′29″W	Medford	
90	Charles Stokes House	Charles Stokes House	August 12, 1993 (#93000827)	600 Beverly-Rancocas Road; 40°00′47″N 74°52′32″W	Willingboro Township	
91	Stokes–Evans House	Stokes–Evans House	August 30, 1994 (#94001009)	52 East Main Street; 39°53′26″N 74°55′03″W	Marlton	
92	Taylor–Newbold House	Taylor–Newbold House	November 18, 1988 (#87001815)	Off Old York Road (CR 660); 40°06′57″N 74°39′58″W	Chesterfield Township	
93	Town Hall	Town Hall	August 10, 1977 (#77000854)	40 East Main Street; 39°57′51″N 74°56′42″W	Moorestown Township	
94	Upper Springfield Meetinghouse	Upper Springfield Meetinghouse	August 24, 1979 (#79001479)	West of Wrightstown; 40°02′40″N 74°38′30″W	Wrightstown	
95	Vincentown Historic District	Vincentown Historic District	September 21, 1988 (#87002107)	Roughly bounded by Mill, Church, Pleasant, Main, and Race Streets, and Red Lion Road; 39°56′05″N 74°45′02″W	Vincentown	
96	West Hill	West Hill	December 18, 2013 (#13000944)	1114 Oxmead Rd. 40°03′17″N 74°49′38″W	Burlington	
97	Whitesbog Historic District	Whitesbog Historic District	October 27, 1988 (#88002115)	North of NJ 70 and south of Fort Dix; 39°57′34″N 74°30′34″W	Browns Mills	Extends into Ocean County
98	Willingboro School House	Willingboro School House	April 21, 1975 (#75001123)	Salem Road; 40°01′51″N 74°53′44″W	Willingboro Township	
99	Jacob Wills House	Jacob Wills House	November 1, 1990 (#89002296)	Brick Road, west of Evans Road, Marlton; 39°52′46″N 74°54′02″W	Evesham Township	Part of the Historic Resources of Evesham Township MPS
100	Zurbrugg Mansion	Zurbrugg Mansion	August 28, 2009 (#09000651)	531 Delaware Avenue; 40°03′03″N 74°37′53″W	Delanco	

== See also ==
- List of National Historic Landmarks in New Jersey
- National Register of Historic Places listings in New Jersey
