= Evans–Cooper House =

- U.S. National Register of Historic Places
- New Jersey Register of Historic Places
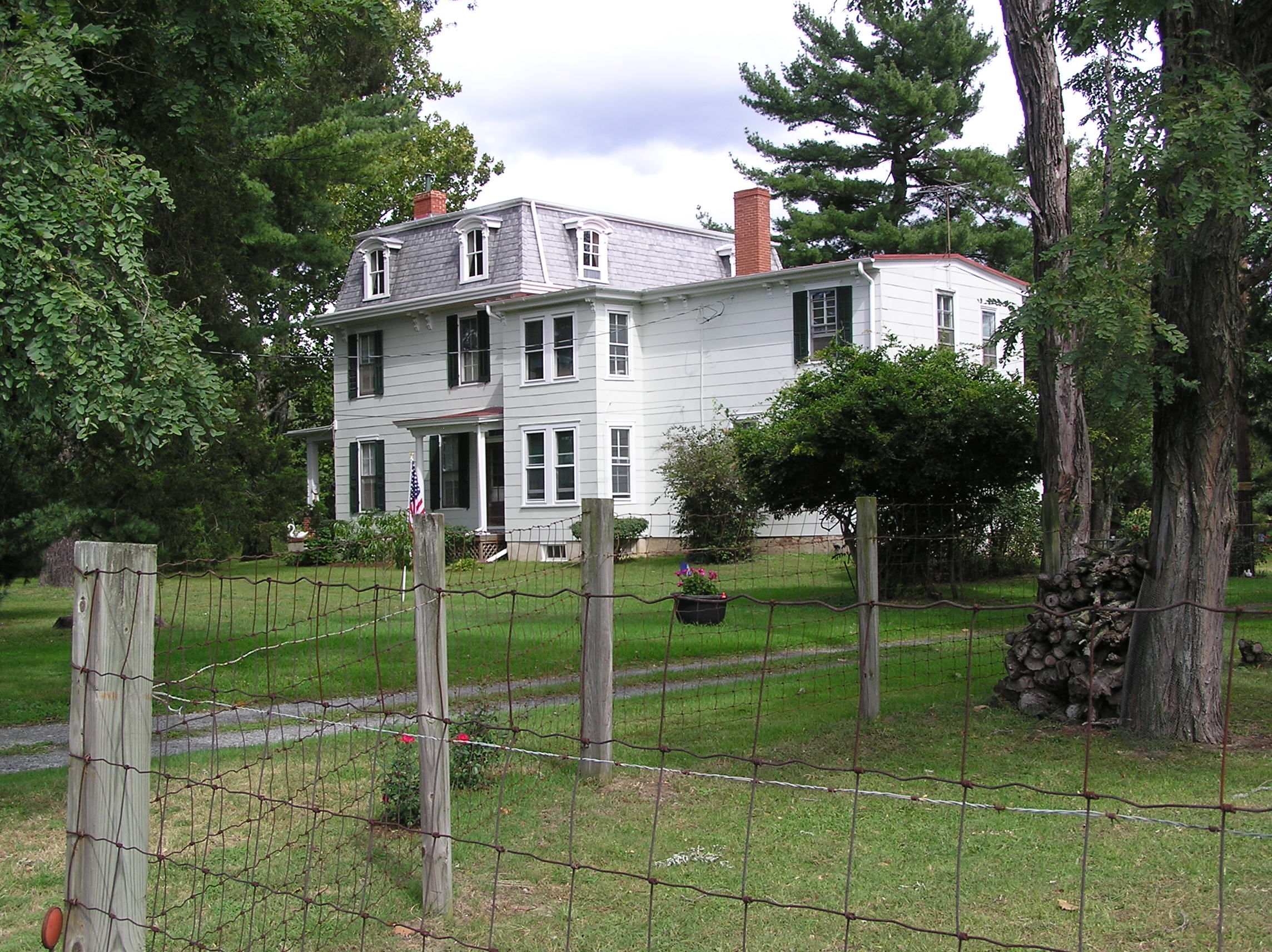

- Location within Burlington County, New Jersey Location within New Jersey Location within the United States
- Location: North Elmwood Road between NJ 70 and Marlton Pike, Pine Grove, New Jersey
- Coordinates: 39°53′22″N 74°53′07″W
- Area: 3 acres (1.2 ha)
- Built: c. 1800
- Architectural style: Second Empire, Federal
- MPS: Historic Resources of Evesham Township MPDF
- NRHP reference No.: 93000868
- NJRHP No.: 799

Significant dates
- Added to NRHP: August 26, 1993
- Designated NJRHP: April 27, 1992

The Evans–Cooper House, also known as the David Evans House, is located along North Elmwood Road in the Pine Grove section of Evesham Township in Burlington County, New Jersey, United States. The oldest part of the house was built around 1800 and features Federal architecture. The historic brick house was added to the National Register of Historic Places on August 26, 1993, for its significance in architecture. It was listed as part of the Historic Resources of Evesham Township, New Jersey, Multiple Property Submission (MPS).

The house was expanded in 1810 and in 1856, adding Second Empire features. The property also includes a wood frame barn. According to the nomination form, the house was likely built by John Evans. His son, David Evans, lived here. His daughter, Lydia Evans, married Benjamin Cooper in 1859. She later inherited the property. In 1975, the township purchased it.

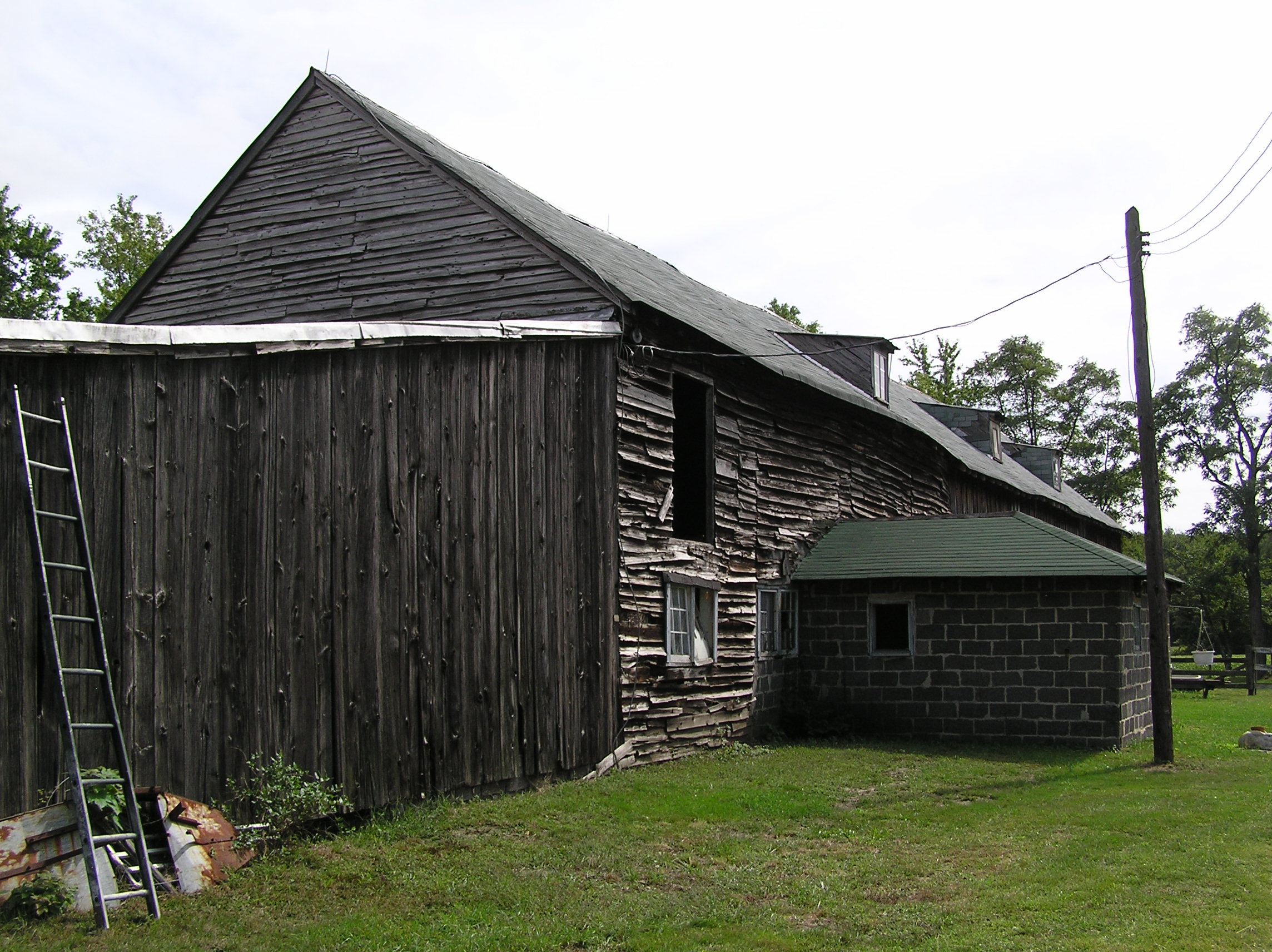
Wood frame barn

== See also ==
- National Register of Historic Places listings in Burlington County, New Jersey
