= Peachfield =

Historic house in New Jersey, United States

- U.S. National Register of Historic Places
- New Jersey Register of Historic Places
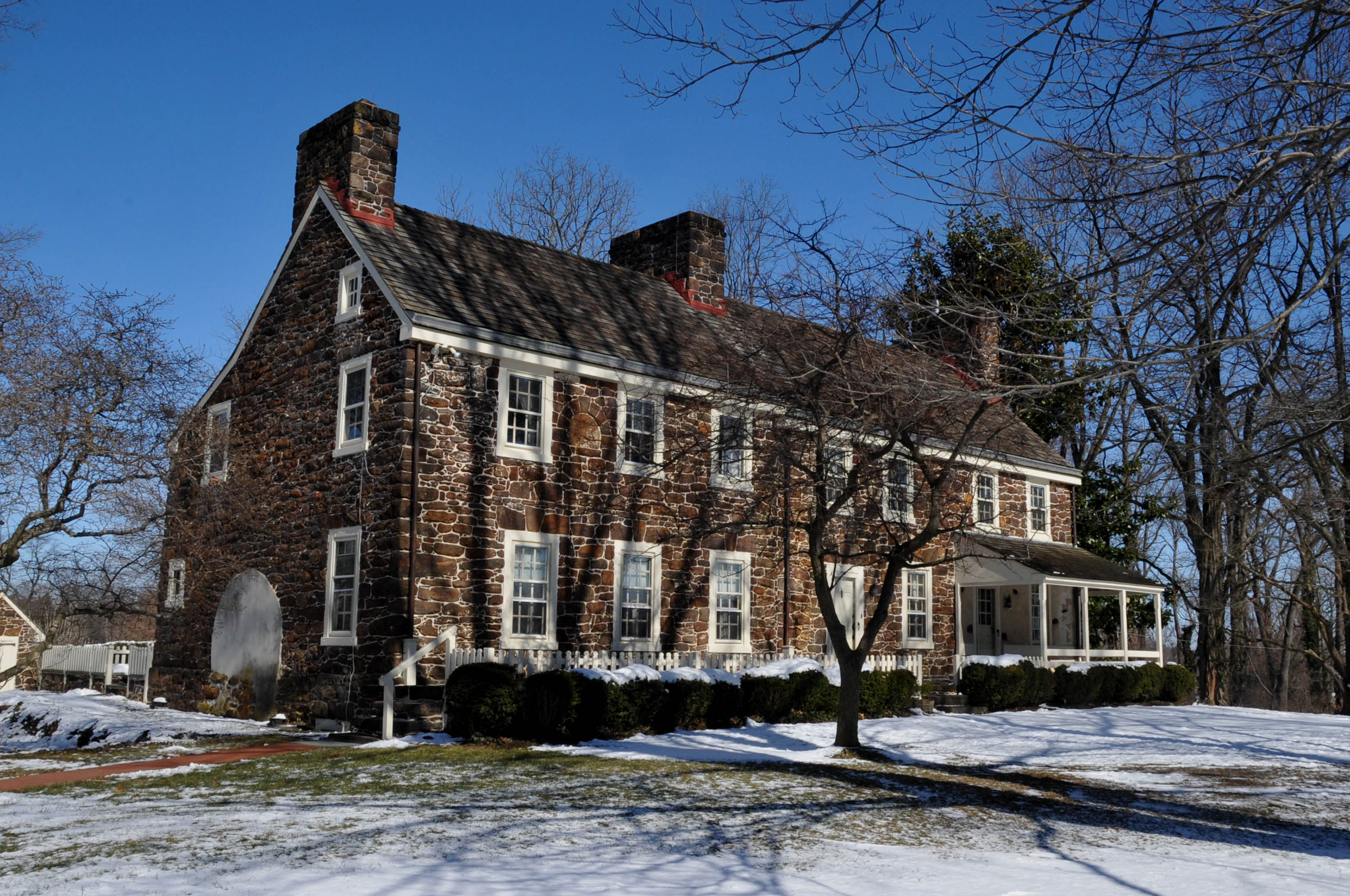

- Location within Burlington County, New Jersey Location within New Jersey Location within the United States
- Location: 180 Burrs Road, Westampton, New Jersey
- Coordinates: 40°2′6″N 74°48′9″W
- Built: 1725
- Built by: Henry Burr; John Burr
- NRHP reference No.: 73001085
- NJRHP No.: 879

Significant dates
- Added to NRHP: June 19, 1973
- Designated NJRHP: February 14, 1973

Peachfield is a historic mansion located at 180 Burrs Road, north of Mount Holly, in the township of Westampton in Burlington County, New Jersey, United States. The house was built in 1725 by Henry Burr and was added to the National Register of Historic Places on June 19, 1973, for its significance in architecture. It was expanded in 1732 by Henry's son, John Burr. According to the nomination form, the house remained in the Burr family for 201 years. It was renovated starting in 1931 under the supervision of the architect Brognard Oakie.

The house is owned by the National Society of The Colonial Dames of America in The State of New Jersey and is operated as a historic house museum that is open for special events and by appointment.

== See also ==
- National Register of Historic Places listings in Burlington County, New Jersey
- List of the oldest buildings in New Jersey
