= John Inskeep Homestead =

Historic house in New Jersey, United States

- U.S. National Register of Historic Places
- New Jersey Register of Historic Places
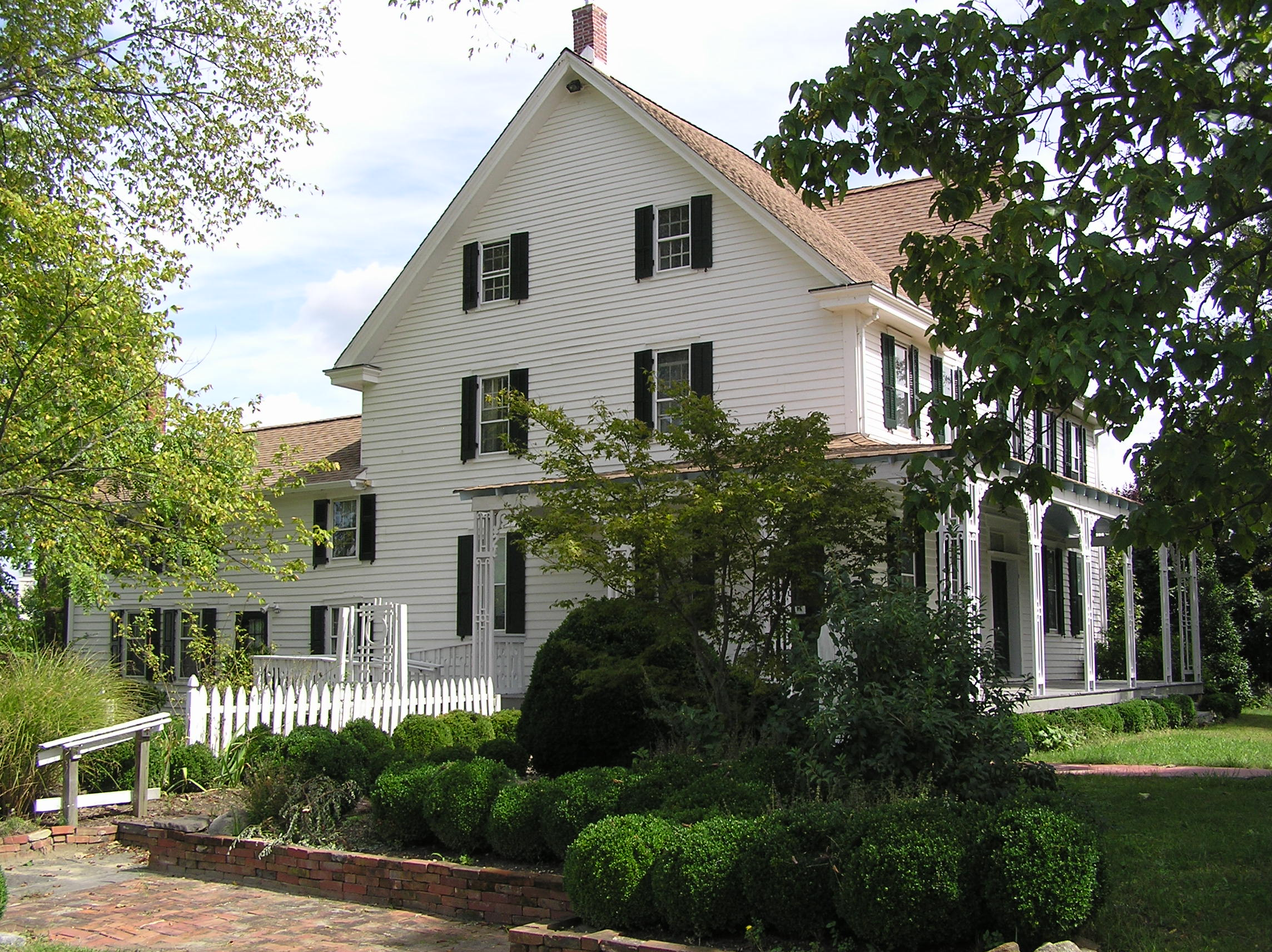

- Location within Burlington County, New Jersey Location within New Jersey Location within the United States
- Location: 70 North Locust Road, Marlton, New Jersey
- Coordinates: 39°53′50″N 74°55′00″W
- Area: less than one acre
- Built: 1771
- Architectural style: Georgian, Gothic Revival, Federal
- MPS: Evesham Township MPS
- NRHP reference No.: 93000866
- NJRHP No.: 2987

Significant dates
- Added to NRHP: August 26, 1993
- Designated NJRHP: July 20, 1993

The John Inskeep Homestead is a historic house located at 70 North Locust Road within the Marlton section of Evesham Township in Burlington County, New Jersey. It was added to the National Register of Historic Places on August 26, 1993, for its significance in architecture, commerce and community development from 1771 to 1810. The house is part of the Historic Resources of Evesham Township, New Jersey Multiple Property Submission (MPS).

== See also ==
- National Register of Historic Places listings in Burlington County, New Jersey
