= Jonathan Haines House =

- U.S. National Register of Historic Places
- New Jersey Register of Historic Places
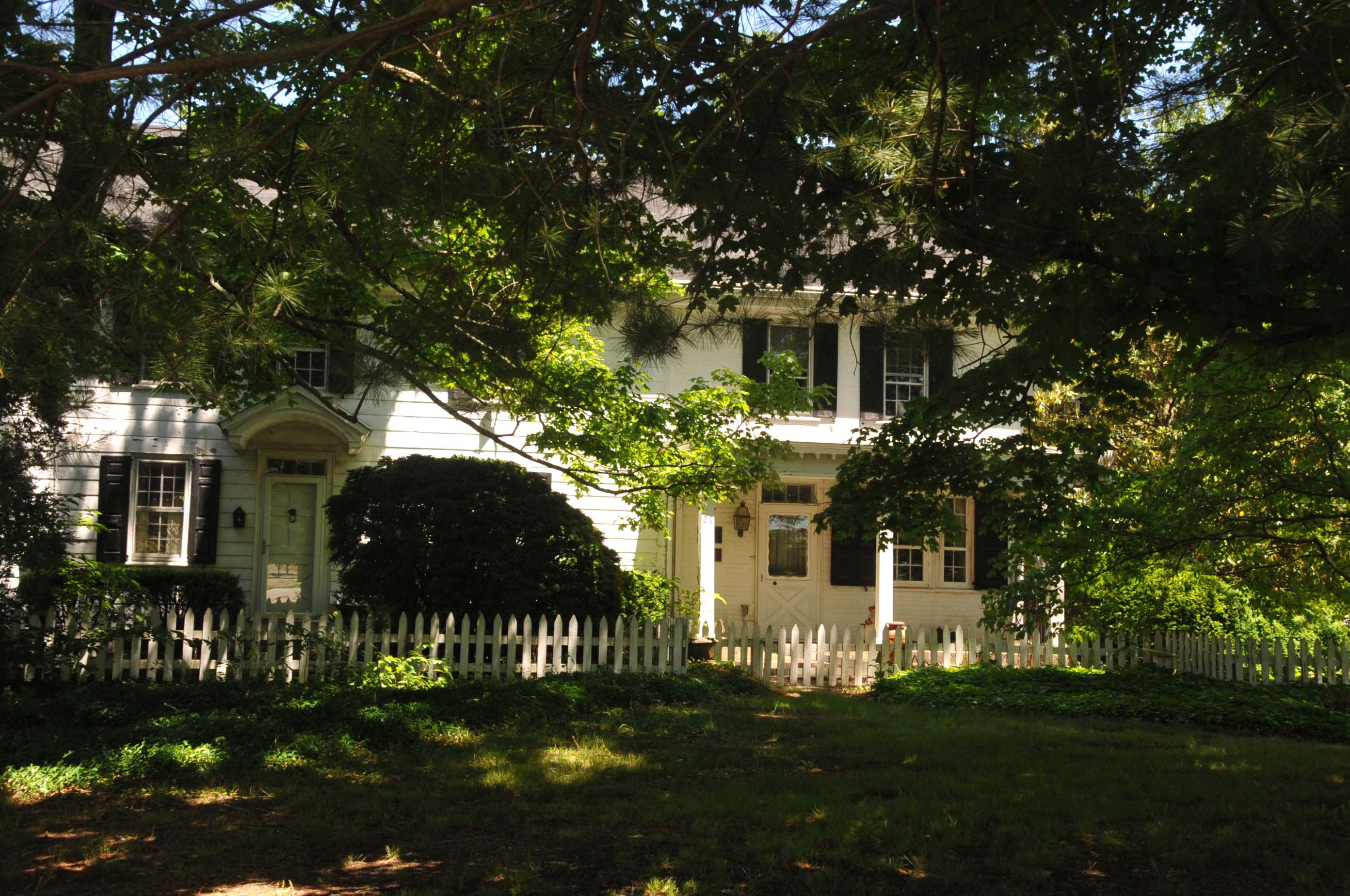

- Location within Burlington County, New Jersey Location within New Jersey Location within the United States
- Location: Fostertown Road, north of Church Road, Medford, New Jersey
- Coordinates: 39°55′24″N 74°48′32″W
- Area: 8 acres (3.2 ha)
- Built: c. 1690
- Built by: Haines Family
- NRHP reference No.: 76001147
- NJRHP No.: 827

Significant dates
- Added to NRHP: June 16, 1976
- Designated NJRHP: January 7, 1976

The Jonathan Haines House, also known as Friendship Farm, is located on Fostertown Road, north of Church Road, in the township of Medford in Burlington County, New Jersey, United States. The oldest section of the house was built around 1690 by John Haines. The historic Quaker farmhouse was added to the National Register of Historic Places on June 16, 1976, for its significance in agriculture and architecture.

The house was first expanded in 1720 by Jonathan Haines with a two-story frame wing. Joseph Haines expanded it in 1808. A two-story brick wing was added around 1850. The house was in the Haines family until 1919. The family also built Kirby's Mill, originally known as Haines' Mill, on the Southwest Branch Rancocas Creek.

== See also ==
- National Register of Historic Places listings in Burlington County, New Jersey
