= Green Hill Farm =

- U.S. National Register of Historic Places
- New Jersey Register of Historic Places
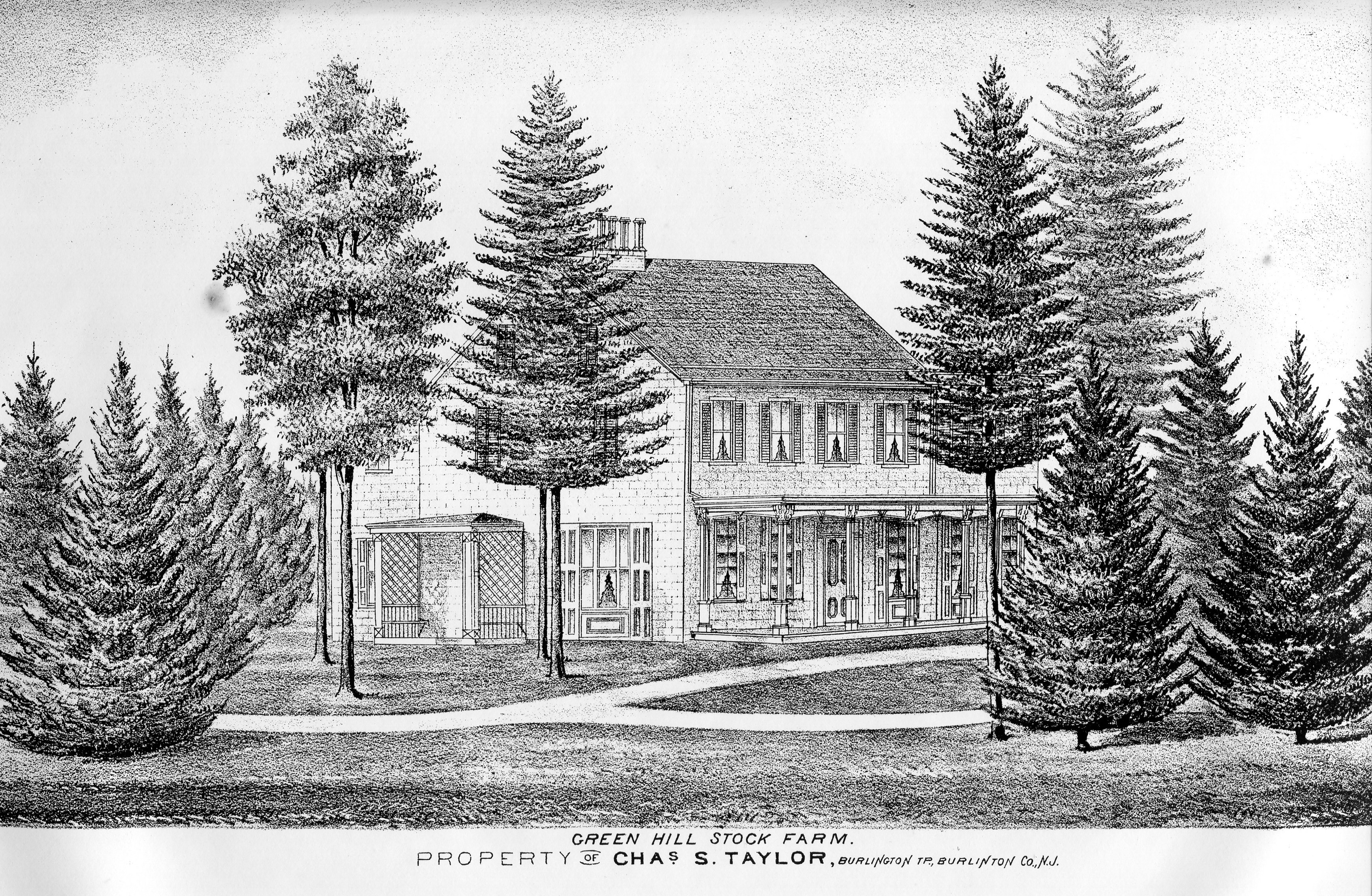
- 1876 Print of the main house at Green Hill Farm.

- Location within Burlington County, New Jersey Location within New Jersey Location within the United States
- Location: Oxmead and Deacon Roads, Burlington Township, New Jersey
- Coordinates: 40°2′42.5″N 74°48′50.4″W
- Area: 9.5 acres (3.8 ha)
- Built: 1800–1803
- Architectural style: Italianate, Gothic Revival, Federal
- NRHP reference No.: 82003265
- NJRHP No.: 774

Significant dates
- Added to NRHP: July 8, 1982
- Designated NJRHP: August 7, 1981

Green Hill Farm is a historic farmhouse located on a former 2,000-acre (8.1 km^{2}) horse farm in Burlington Township of Burlington County, New Jersey, United States. It was added to the National Register of Historic Places on July 8, 1982, for its significance in agriculture and architecture.

== History and description ==
The land was owned and operated by families out of Burlington and Philadelphia. First, Green Hill was owned by Samuel Jennings, the acting Governor of West Jersey. Jennings purchased the property in 1681 and gave it the name Green Hill. It is possible that he named it after Green Hill near Kenilworth, Evesham in Worcester, England though there is not conclusive proof of this. In 1791, John Smith bought 340 acres (1.4 km^{2}) of the Jennings property. The famous brick house located there was built between 1800 and 1803. The frame tenant house was the home of various families to work on the farm. The 9.5 acres that remain of Green Hill was purchased by Stephen and Helen Matlaga in 1973. The Matlagas and their extended family painstakingly restored the main house along with two tenant houses and converted the 1867 barn into a medical office. Dr. Stephen Matlaga still owns and operates Green Hill Chiropractic out of this space.

== See also ==
- National Register of Historic Places listings in Burlington County, New Jersey
