= William and Susan Evans House =

- U.S. National Register of Historic Places
- New Jersey Register of Historic Places
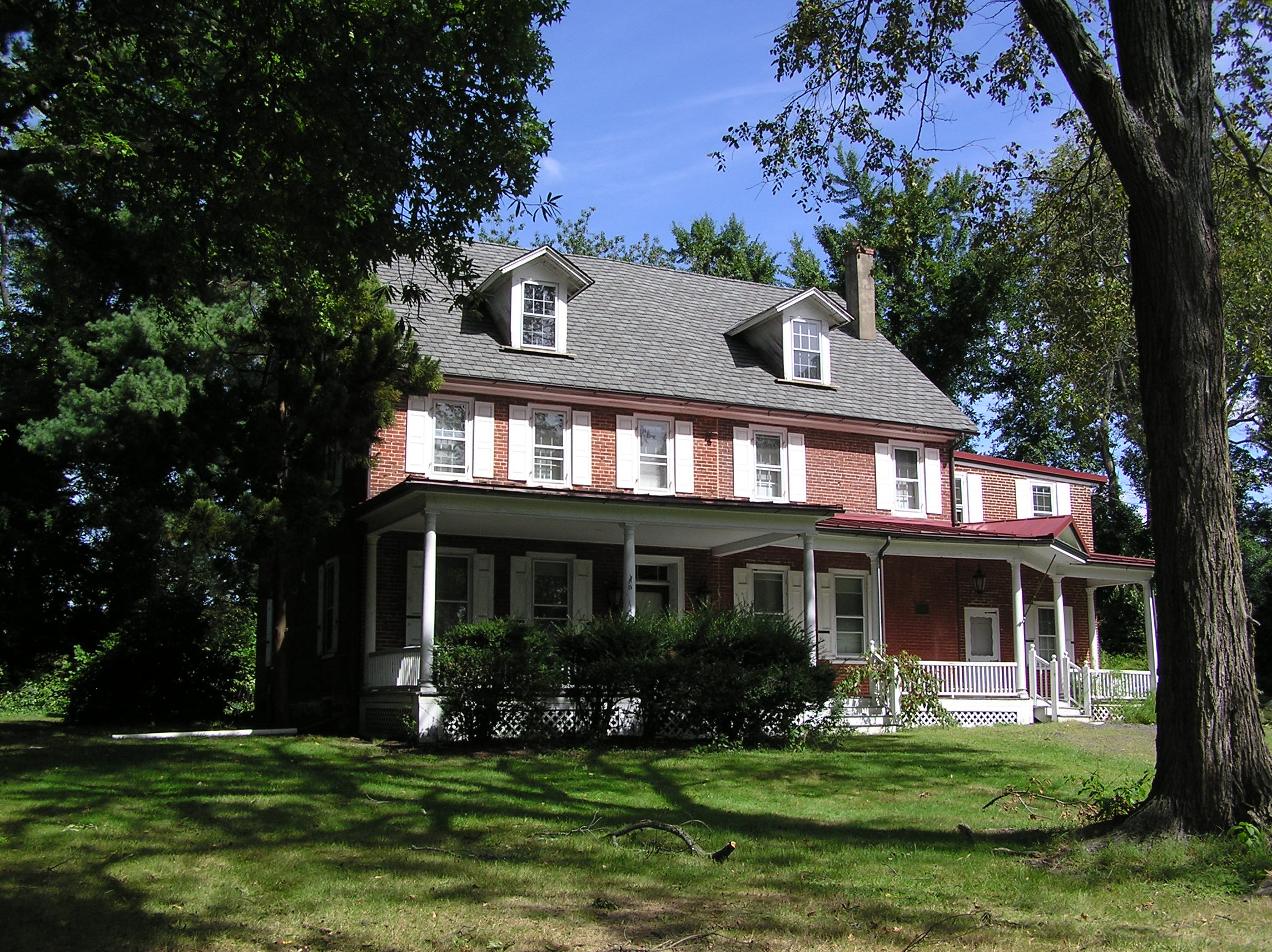

- Location within Burlington County, New Jersey Location within New Jersey Location within the United States
- Location: 2 Bills Lane, Marlton, New Jersey
- Coordinates: 39°52′24″N 74°54′12″W
- Area: 11.9 acres (4.8 ha)
- Built: 1822
- Built by: Joseph Buzby; Francis Haines
- Architectural style: Federal
- MPS: Historic Resources of Evesham Township MPDF
- NRHP reference No.: 92000978
- NJRHP No.: 801

Significant dates
- Added to NRHP: August 14, 1992
- Designated NJRHP: June 25, 1992

The William and Susan Evans House, also known as Hillside Farm, is located at 2 Bills Lane near the Marlton section of Evesham Township in Burlington County, New Jersey, United States. The oldest part of the Quaker farmhouse was built in 1822. The historic brick house was added to the National Register of Historic Places on August 14, 1992, for its significance in agriculture, architecture, and politics/government. It was listed as part of the Historic Resources of Evesham Township, New Jersey, Multiple Property Submission (MPS).

According to the nomination form, John Evans married Rebecca Cowperthwaite in 1799 and later built the earliest part of the house. After his death in 1841, the property was inherited by his son William Evans, who had married Susan Evens in 1834. After his death in 1864, it passed to his son Joseph Evans and wife Lydia Wills, who named the farm Hillside.

== See also ==
- National Register of Historic Places listings in Burlington County, New Jersey
