= Smith Mansion =

Historic house in New Jersey, United States

- U.S. National Register of Historic Places
- New Jersey Register of Historic Places
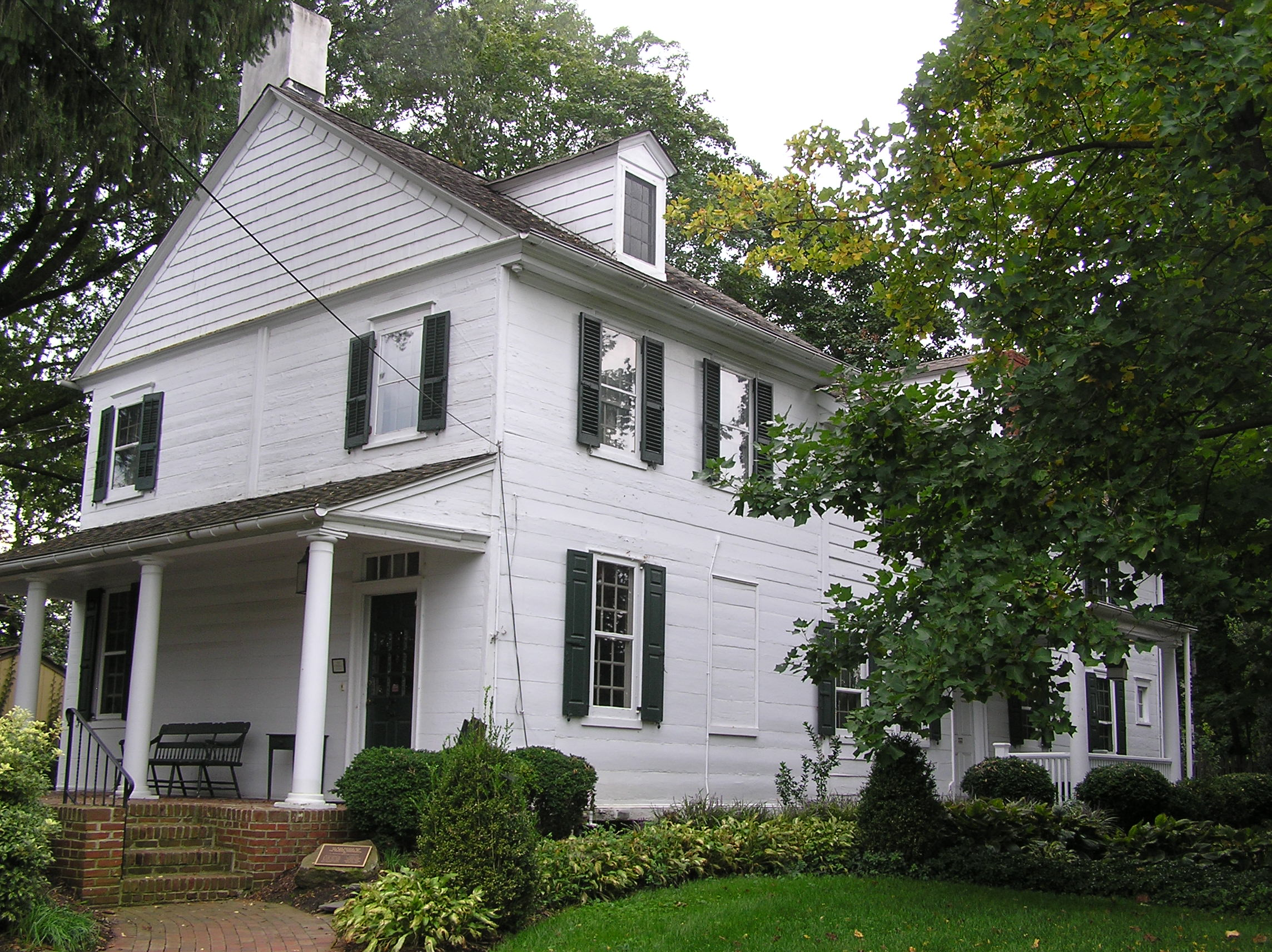

- Location within Burlington County, New Jersey Location within New Jersey Location within the United States
- Location: 12 High Street, Moorestown, New Jersey
- Coordinates: 39°57′46″N 74°56′51″W
- Built: 1738
- NRHP reference No.: 76001148
- NJRHP No.: 840

Significant dates
- Added to NRHP: October 22, 1976
- Designated NJRHP: August 10, 1973

The Smith Mansion, also known as the Smith–Cadbury Mansion, is located at 12 High Street in the township of Moorestown in Burlington County, New Jersey, United States. The historic house was built in 1738 and was added to the National Register of Historic Places on October 22, 1976, for its significance in architecture and military history.

The oldest section of the house was built in 1738 by Joshua Humphries. It was extended in the late 1760s. Samuel Smith, treasurer of the Province of West Jersey, purchased the property in 1766. His son, Richard S. Smith, inherited it in 1775. During the American Revolutionary War, General Wilhelm von Knyphausen and his Hessian troops occupied the property on the night of June 19, 1778, while retreating from Philadelphia. British merchant Edward Harris Sr. purchased the property in 1798. His son, Edward Harris Jr., inherited it in 1822. He was a friend and benefactor of John James Audubon. The house was purchased by John and Rachael Cadbury in 1924. The Historical Society of Moorestown purchased it in 1970.

The Smith–Cadbury Mansion serves as the headquarters of the Historical Society of Moorestown.

== See also ==
- National Register of Historic Places listings in Burlington County, New Jersey
- List of museums in New Jersey
