= William Ridgway House =

- U.S. National Register of Historic Places
- New Jersey Register of Historic Places
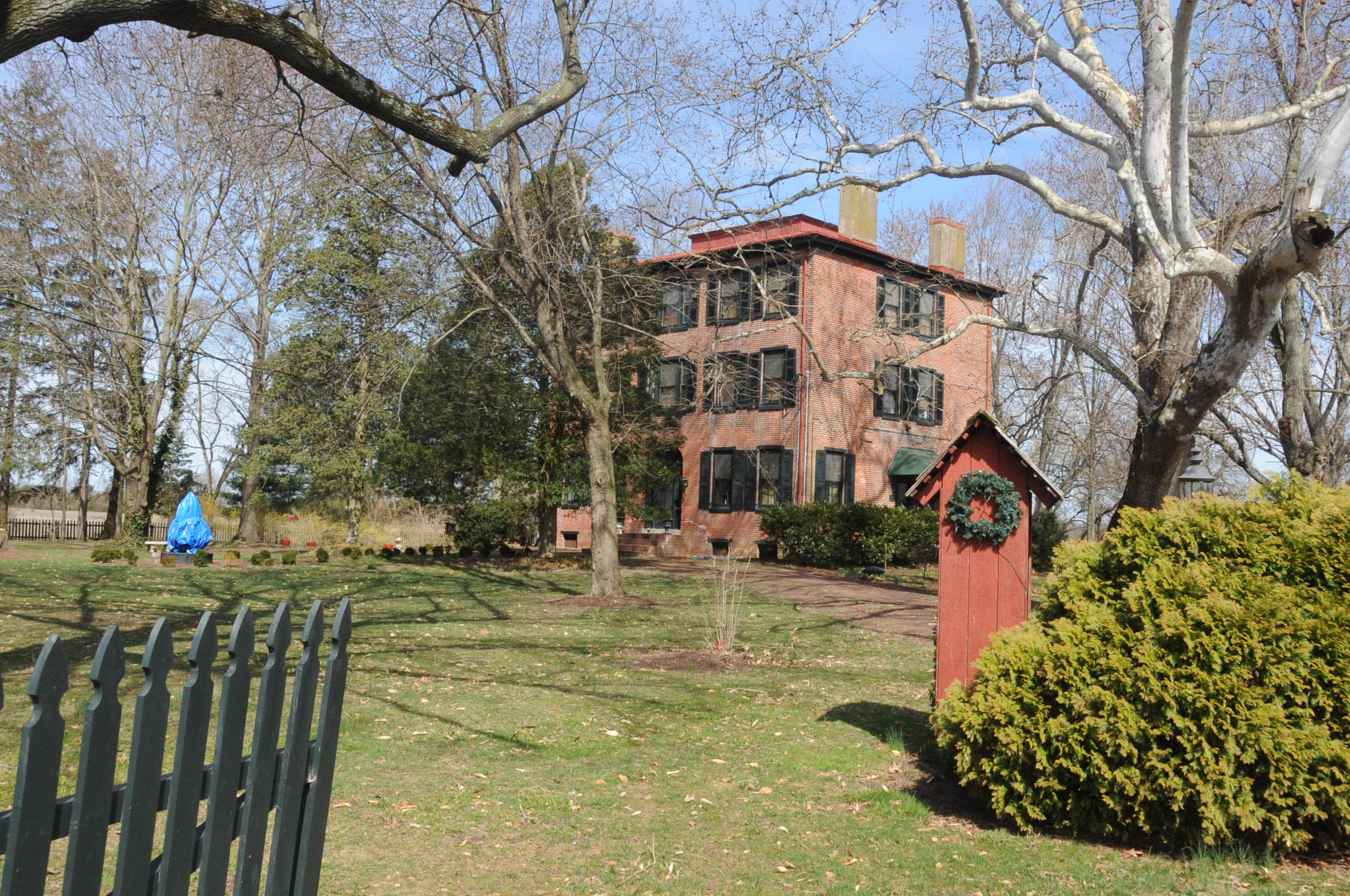

- Location within Burlington County, New Jersey Location within New Jersey Location within the United States
- Location: 149 Juliustown Road, Springfield Township, Burlington County, New Jersey
- Coordinates: 40°00′44.8″N 74°42′31.2″W
- Built: c. 1840
- Architectural style: Federal
- NRHP reference No.: 100003304
- NJRHP No.: 5661

Significant dates
- Added to NRHP: January 11, 2019
- Designated NJRHP: October 29, 2018

The William Ridgway House, also known as the J.B. Deacon House, is located at 149 Juliustown Road in the Arneys Mount section of Springfield Township in Burlington County, New Jersey, United States. The brick house was built around 1840 and was added to the National Register of Historic Places on January 11, 2019, for its significance in architecture.

== History and description ==
Caleb Shinn purchased the farmland in 1809. At his death in 1835, his adopted daughter, Mary Wright Rossell, inherited the property. She married William Ridgway in 1836, but died after their daughter, Elizabeth Ridgway, was born. Elizabeth inherited the property and lived with her father William. According to the nomination form, he likely built the house, which dates to around 1840 based on architectural evidence. Elizabeth married John B. Deacon in 1857. The three-story building features Federal architecture. The listing also includes a Louden dairy barn built around 1920.

== See also ==
- National Register of Historic Places listings in Burlington County, New Jersey
