= Providence Presbyterian Church of Bustleton =

Historic church in New Jersey, United States

- U.S. National Register of Historic Places
- New Jersey Register of Historic Places
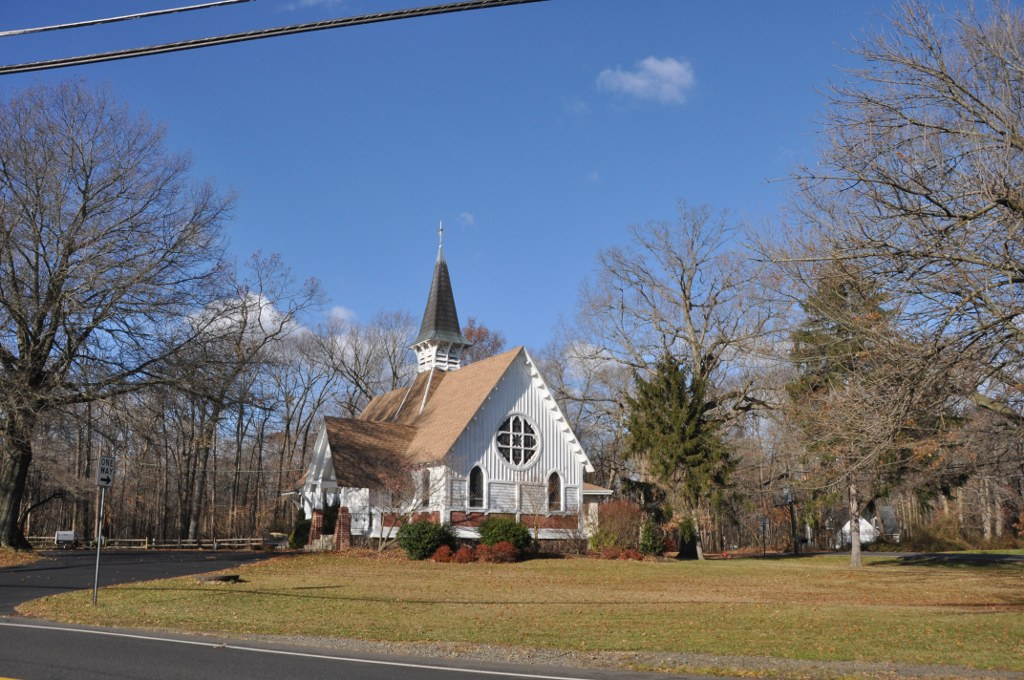

- Location within Burlington County, New Jersey Location within New Jersey Location within the United States
- Nearest city: Roebling, New Jersey
- Coordinates: 40°5′16″N 74°47′2″W
- Area: 1.7 acres (0.69 ha)
- Built: 1863
- Architect: Hewitt, William; Miller & Estelow
- Architectural style: Late Victorian, Gothic, Carpenter Gothic
- NRHP reference No.: 87000377
- NJRHP No.: 812

Significant dates
- Added to NRHP: November 18, 1988
- Designated NJRHP: January 5, 1987

Providence Presbyterian Church of Bustleton is an historic church in the Bustleton section of Florence Township, Burlington County, New Jersey, United States.

It was built in 1863 and added to the National Register of Historic Places in 1988.

== See also ==
- National Register of Historic Places listings in Burlington County, New Jersey
