= Jacob Wills House =

- U.S. National Register of Historic Places
- New Jersey Register of Historic Places
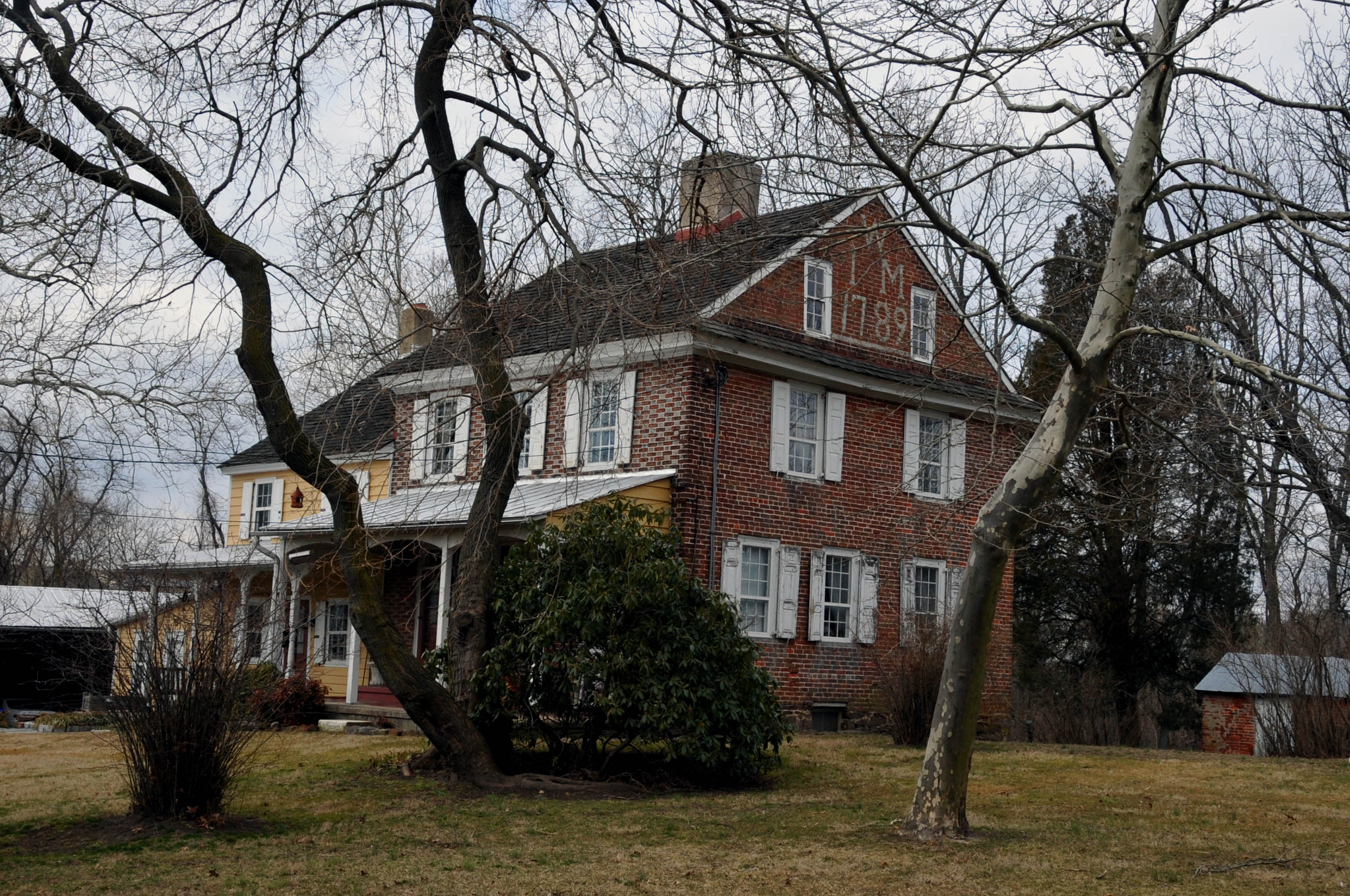
- The Jacob Wills House in 2013

- Location within Burlington County, New Jersey Location within New Jersey Location within the United States
- Location: Brick Road, west of Evans Road, Evesham Township, New Jersey
- Coordinates: 39°52′46″N 74°54′02″W
- Built: 1789
- Built by: Jacob Wills
- Architectural style: Georgian, Corner Passage Plan, Delaware Valley Vernacular
- MPS: Historic Resources of Evesham Township MPDF
- NRHP reference No.: 89002296
- NJRHP No.: 809

Significant dates
- Added to NRHP: November 1, 1990
- Designated NJRHP: November 29, 1989

The Jacob Wills House is an eighteenth-century Flemish "checkerboard" brick farmhouse, located on Brick Road, west of Evans Road, near the Marlton section of Evesham Township in Burlington County, New Jersey, United States. It was built in 1789 and added to the National Register of Historic Places on November 1, 1990, for its significance in architecture. It was listed as part of the Historic Resources of Evesham Township, New Jersey, Multiple Property Submission (MPS).

Jacob Wills was a descendant of Dr. Daniel Wills, a Quaker, who had purchased the land in 1676 from William Penn. The brickwork in the gable of the house has the initial I, M, and W for Jacob and Mary Wills, and the date 1789.

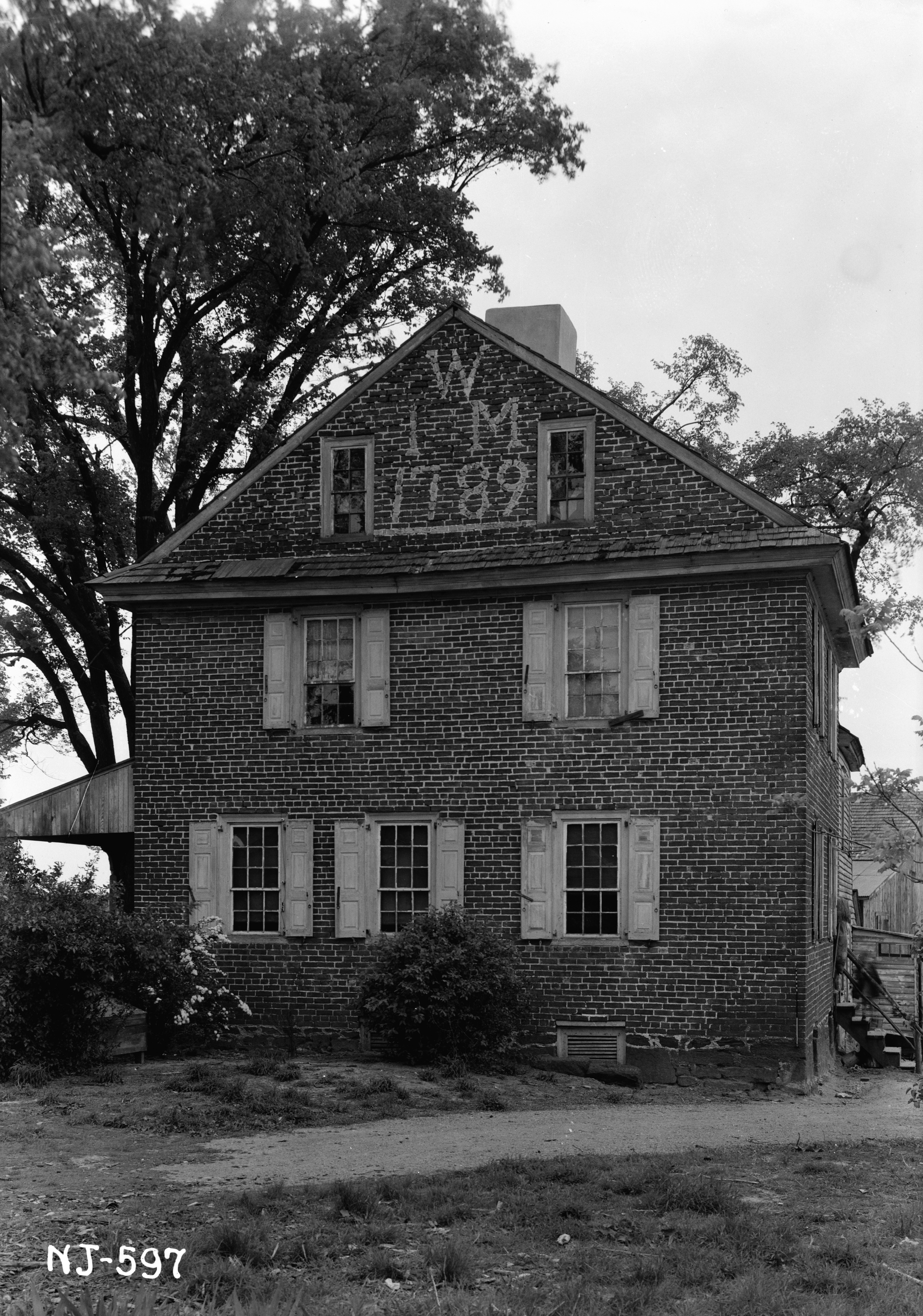
HABS photo from 1939 showing initials and date

== See also ==
- National Register of Historic Places listings in Burlington County, New Jersey
