= Thomas and Mary Evens House =

- U.S. National Register of Historic Places
- New Jersey Register of Historic Places
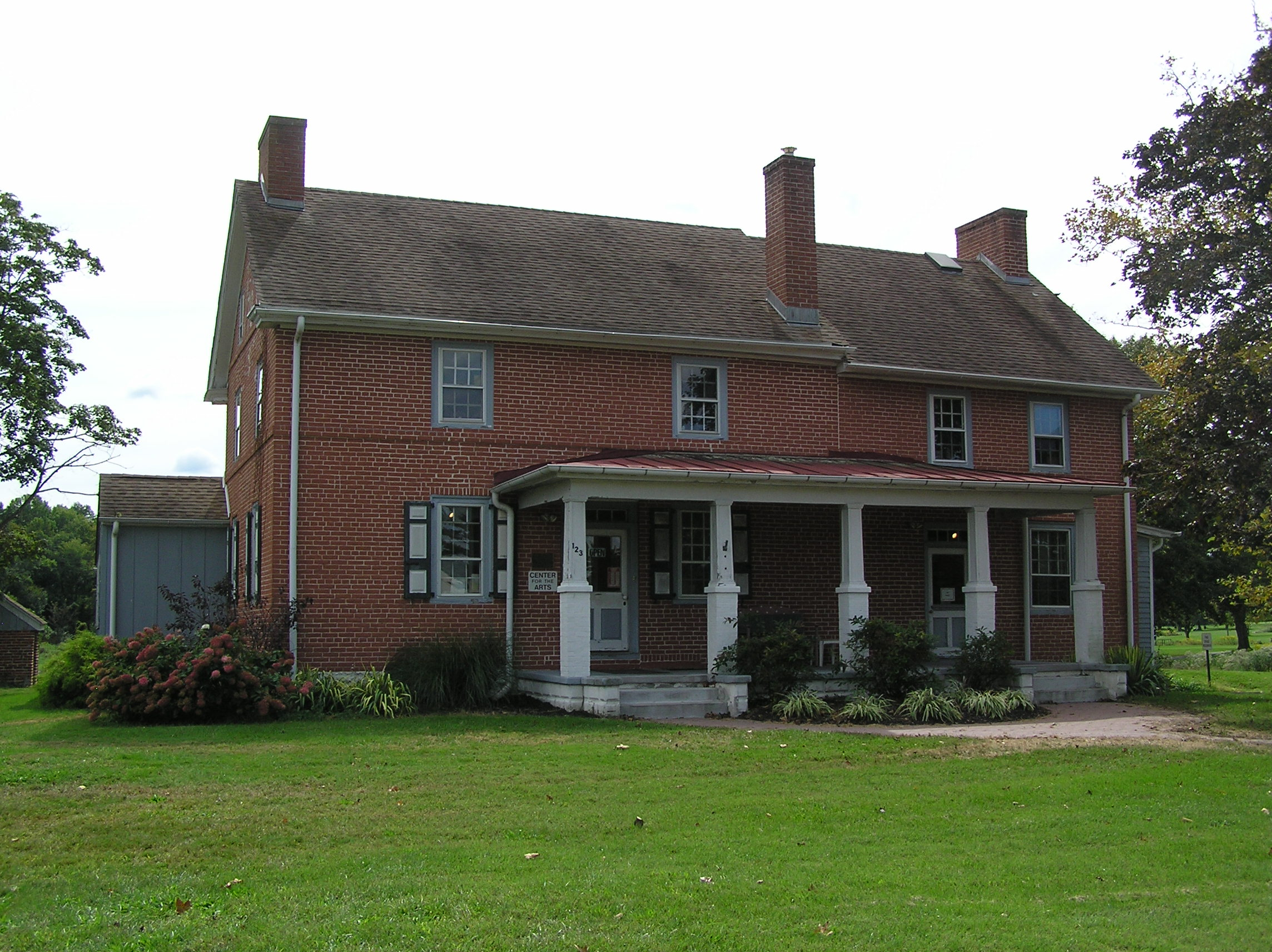

- Location within Burlington County, New Jersey Location within New Jersey Location within the United States
- Location: S. Elmwood Road, Pine Grove, New Jersey
- Coordinates: 39°52′51″N 74°53′19″W
- Built: 1785
- Architectural style: Colonial, Georgian
- NRHP reference No.: 93000867
- NJRHP No.: 802

Significant dates
- Added to NRHP: August 26, 1993
- Designated NJRHP: July 20, 1993

The Thomas and Mary Evens House, also known as the Jaggard House, is located along South Elmwood Road in the Pine Grove section of Evesham Township in Burlington County, New Jersey, United States. The oldest part of the house was built in 1785. The historic brick house was added to the National Register of Historic Places on August 26, 1993, for its significance in architecture.

The two and one-half story Georgian house features the initials T, M, and E and the date 1785 in the gable, done with glazed brick headers. The house was expanded around 1790 and again around 1900. It was purchased by the township in 1974 and is located in the township's Indian Spring golf course.

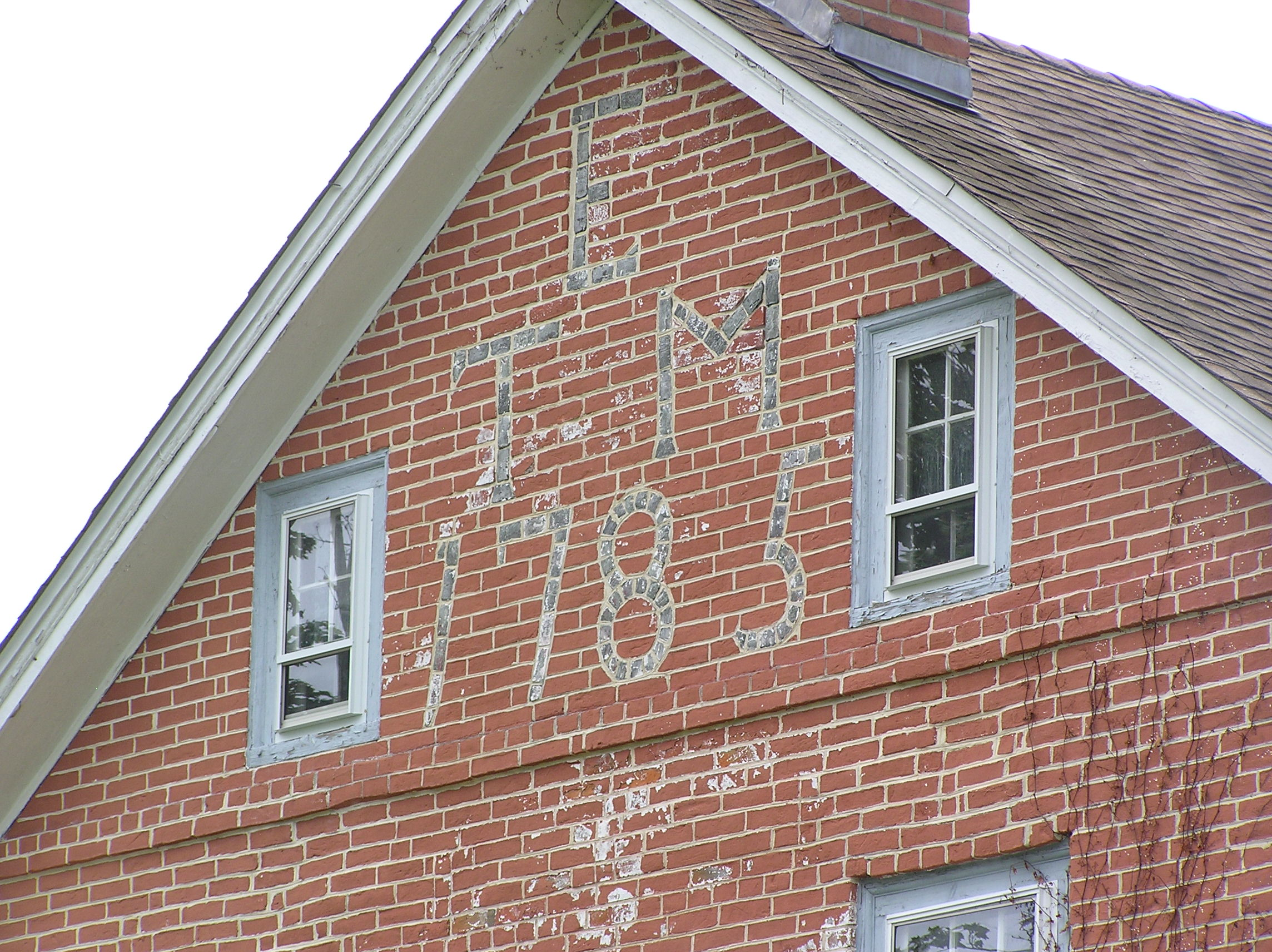
Gable detail

== See also ==
- National Register of Historic Places listings in Burlington County, New Jersey
