= Oakwood (Wrightstown, New Jersey) =

- U.S. National Register of Historic Places
- New Jersey Register of Historic Places
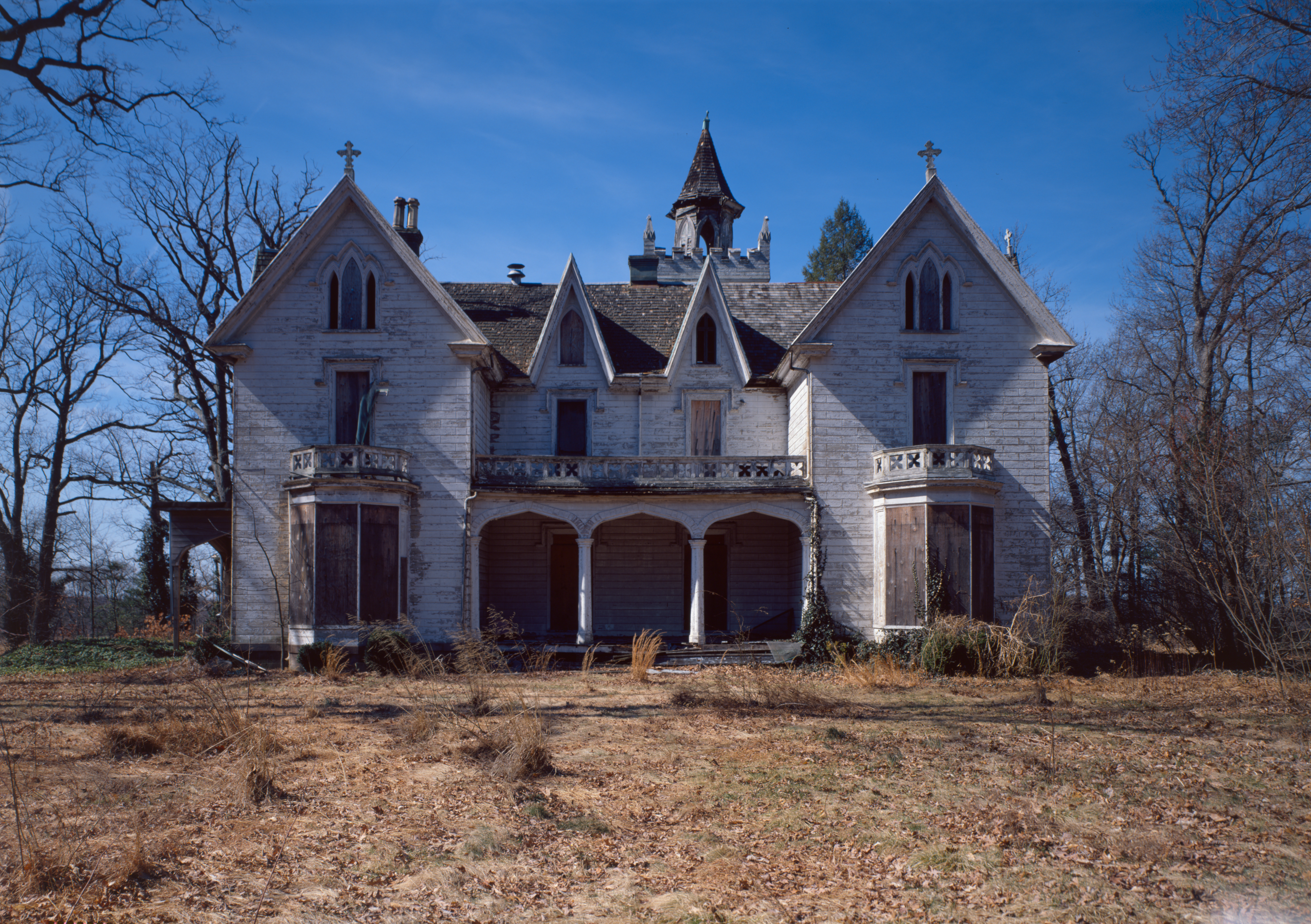
- HABS photo from 1999

- Location within Burlington County, New Jersey Location within New Jersey Location within the United States
- Location: West of Wrightstown on Springfield Meeting Road, Springfield Township, New Jersey
- Nearest city: Wrightstown, New Jersey
- Coordinates: 40°03′07″N 74°38′21″W
- Area: 5 acres (2.0 ha)
- Built: 1853
- Architect: Samuel Sloan
- Architectural style: Gothic Revival
- NRHP reference No.: 78001751
- NJRHP No.: 873

Significant dates
- Added to NRHP: January 30, 1978
- Designated NJRHP: April 15, 1977

Oakwood, also known as the Newbold–Hutchinson House, was located on Springfield Meeting Road, west of Wrightstown, in Springfield Township of Burlington County, New Jersey, United States. The historic Gothic Revival house was built in 1853 and was added to the National Register of Historic Places on January 30, 1978, for its significance in agriculture, architecture, and industry. It was documented by the Historic American Buildings Survey (HABS) in 1999. The house was destroyed by fire on July 20, 2002.

According to the nomination form, the house was built for Michael Earl Newbold in 1853. After his death, the property was purchased by John P. Hutchinson, who was married to Newbold's daughter.

== See also ==
- National Register of Historic Places listings in Burlington County, New Jersey
