= William and Susannah Newbold House =

- U.S. National Register of Historic Places
- New Jersey Register of Historic Places
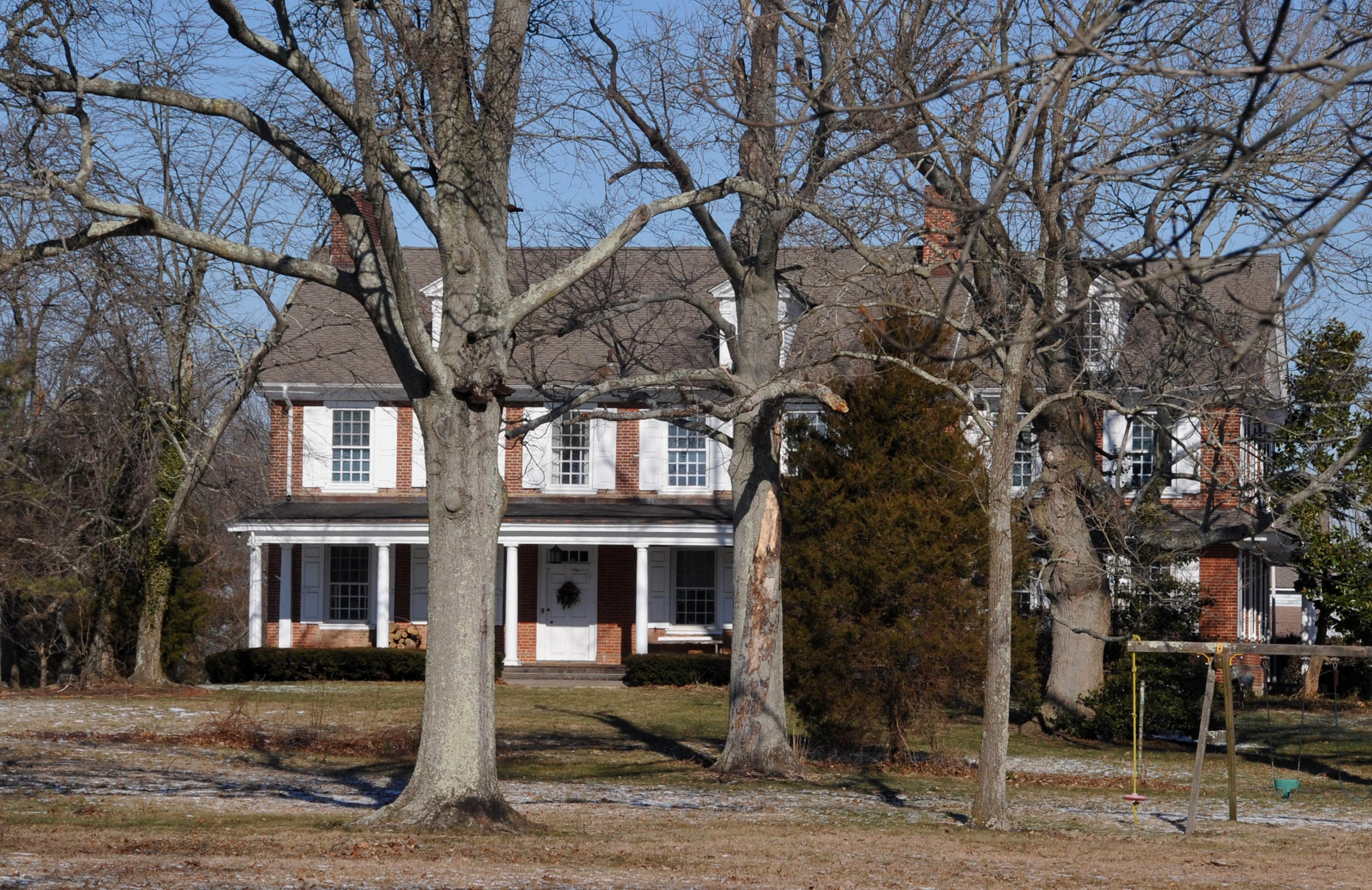

- Location within Burlington County, New Jersey Location within New Jersey Location within the United States
- Location: Corner of Herman Black and Sykesville roads, Chesterfield Township, New Jersey
- Coordinates: 40°4′54″N 74°37′38.5″W
- Area: 12 acres (4.9 ha)
- Built: c. 1740
- Architectural style: Georgian
- NRHP reference No.: 80002472
- NJRHP No.: 780

Significant dates
- Added to NRHP: September 29, 1980
- Designated NJRHP: February 1, 1980

The William and Susannah Newbold House, also known as The Locusts, is located at the corner of Herman Black and Sykesville roads, east of Georgetown, in Chesterfield Township of Burlington County, New Jersey, United States. The Georgian style brick house was built around 1740 and was added to the National Register of Historic Places on September 29, 1980, for its significance in architecture, exploration/settlement, and invention. It is also noted in the Traditional Patterned Brickwork Buildings in New Jersey Multiple Property Submission (MPS).

== History and description ==
William and Susannah Newbold expanded the house in 1769, more than doubling its size. Glazed headers in the west gable display the initials WSN and the date 1769. Percival Fowler added a Colonial Revival style section in 1908.

== See also ==
- National Register of Historic Places listings in Burlington County, New Jersey
