= Barzillai Newbold House =

- U.S. National Register of Historic Places
- New Jersey Register of Historic Places
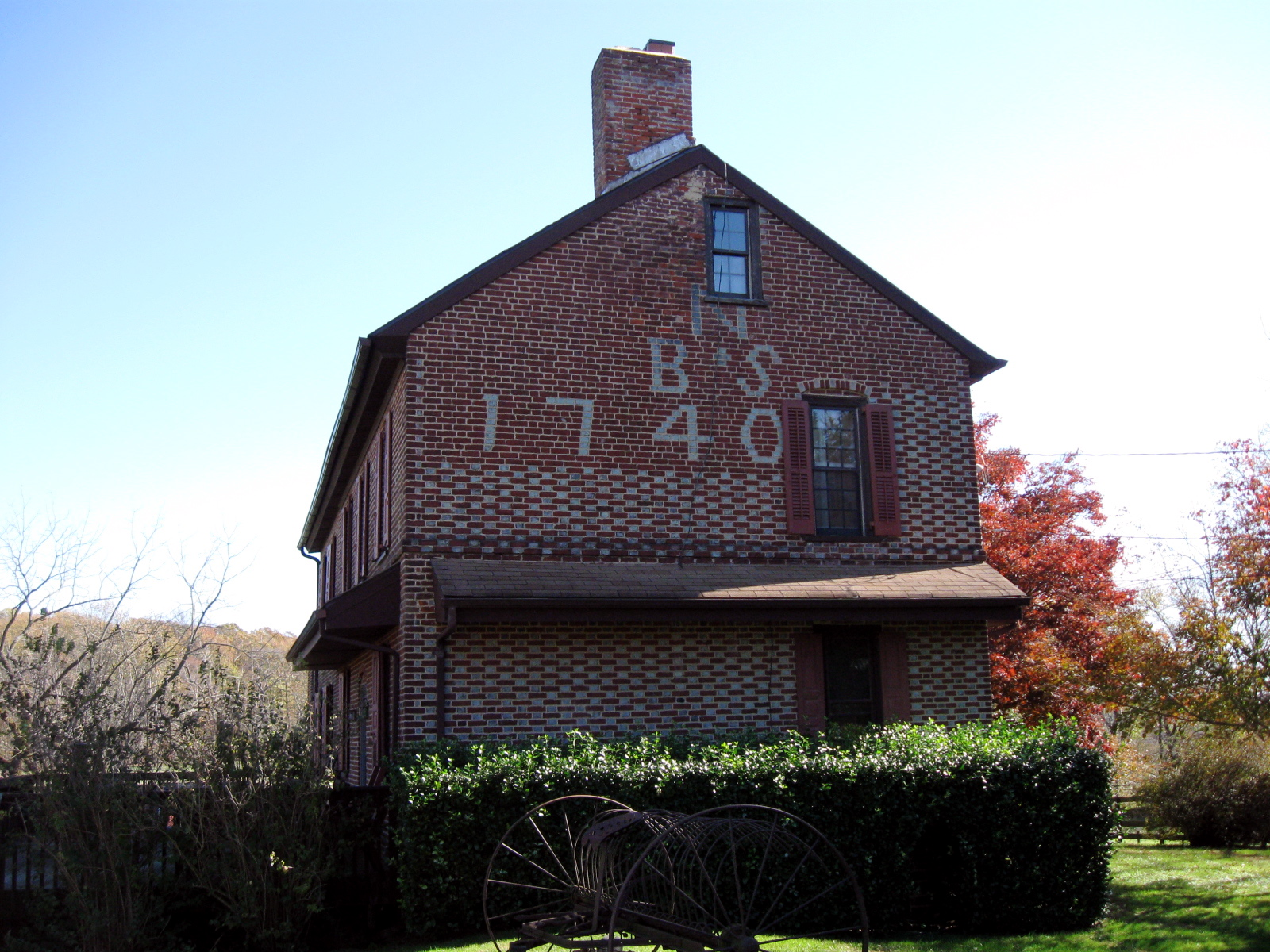

- Location within Burlington County, New Jersey Location within New Jersey Location within the United States
- Location: Columbus-Georgetown Road and Gaunt's Bridge Road, Mansfield Township, Burlington County, New Jersey
- Coordinates: 40°3′56.4″N 74°40′2.2″W
- Area: 2.8 acres (1.1 ha)
- Built: 1740
- NRHP reference No.: 78001749
- NJRHP No.: 823

Significant dates
- Added to NRHP: January 26, 1978
- Designated NJRHP: April 15, 1977

The Barzillai Newbold House, also known as the Bowne House, is located at the corner of Columbus–Georgetown and Gaunt's Bridge roads, east of Columbus, in Mansfield Township of Burlington County, New Jersey, United States. The historic brick house was built in 1740 and was added to the National Register of Historic Places on January 26, 1978, for its significance in agriculture and architecture. It is also noted in the Traditional Patterned Brickwork Buildings in New Jersey Multiple Property Submission (MPS).

== History and description ==
The house features the initials BNS, for Barzillai and Sarah Newbold, and the date, 1740, in glazed brickwork in the west gable. According to the nomination form, it is "an early and fine example of a patterned brickwork rural Quaker house that has never undergone appreciable alteration." It was extended with an addition built around 1840. The house remained in the same family until 1975, when owner Walter Bowne died.

== See also ==
- National Register of Historic Places listings in Burlington County, New Jersey
- List of the oldest buildings in New Jersey
