= Taylor–Newbold House =

- U.S. National Register of Historic Places
- New Jersey Register of Historic Places
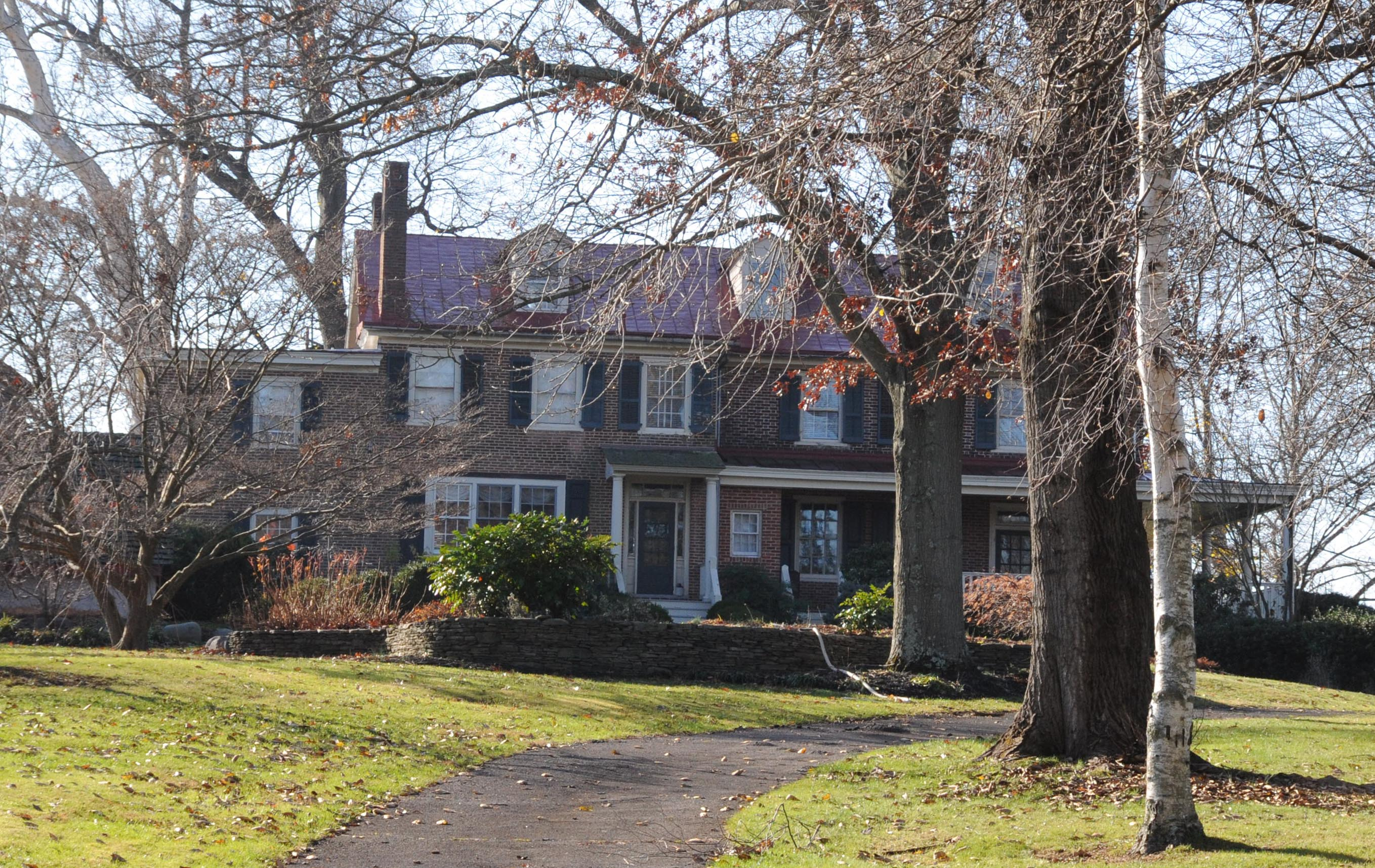

- Location within Burlington County, New Jersey Location within New Jersey Location within the United States
- Location: Off Old York Road (CR 660), Chesterfield Township, New Jersey
- Coordinates: 40°6′57.2″N 74°39′58.2″W
- Area: 160 acres (65 ha)
- Built: 1766
- NRHP reference No.: 87001815
- NJRHP No.: 783

Significant dates
- Added to NRHP: November 18, 1988
- Designated NJRHP: August 31, 1987

The Taylor–Newbold House, also known as Brookdale Farm, is located off Old York Road (CR 660) in Chesterfield Township of Burlington County, New Jersey, United States. The oldest section of the brick house was built in 1766. It was added to the National Register of Historic Places on November 18, 1988, for its significance in architecture and politics/government.

== History and description ==
The patterned brick house consists of two interlocking L-shaped sections. One was built in 1766 for Anthony Taylor and his wife, Ann Newbold Taylor, and the other around 1850, built for William Augustus Newbold. The brickwork features the initials ATA in the west gable, for Anthony and his wife. The farm was the site of the "Battle of Brookdale" during the period of the American Revolutionary War.

== See also ==
- National Register of Historic Places listings in Burlington County, New Jersey
- List of the oldest buildings in New Jersey
