= Charles Stokes House =

- U.S. National Register of Historic Places
- New Jersey Register of Historic Places
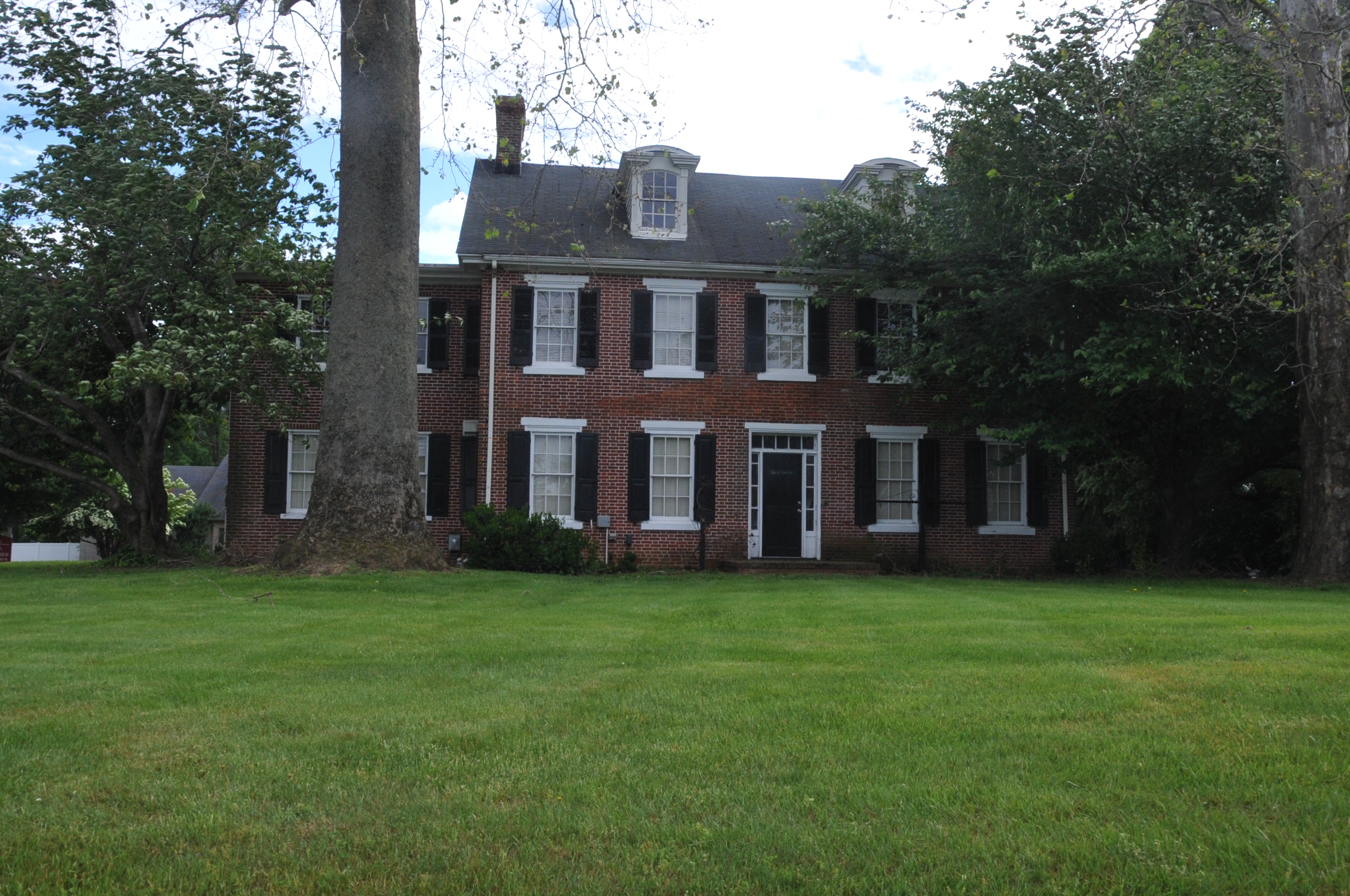

- Location within Burlington County, New Jersey Location within New Jersey Location within the United States
- Location: 600 Beverly-Rancocas Road, Willingboro, New Jersey
- Coordinates: 40°00′46.8″N 74°52′32.2″W
- Built: 1815
- Architectural style: Federal
- NRHP reference No.: 93000827
- NJRHP No.: 882

Significant dates
- Added to NRHP: August 12, 1993
- Designated NJRHP: July 2, 1993

The Charles Stokes House is located at 600 Beverly-Rancocas Road in Willingboro Township in Burlington County, New Jersey, United States. The two-story brick building was built in 1815 and was added to the National Register of Historic Places on August 12, 1993, for its significance in architecture and politics/government.

== History and description ==
According to the nomination form, the house is a locally significant example of Federal architecture. It was the home of Charles Stokes (1791–1882), a surveyor, politician, and prominent Quaker.

== See also ==
- National Register of Historic Places listings in Burlington County, New Jersey
