= Stokes–Evans House =

- U.S. National Register of Historic Places
- New Jersey Register of Historic Places
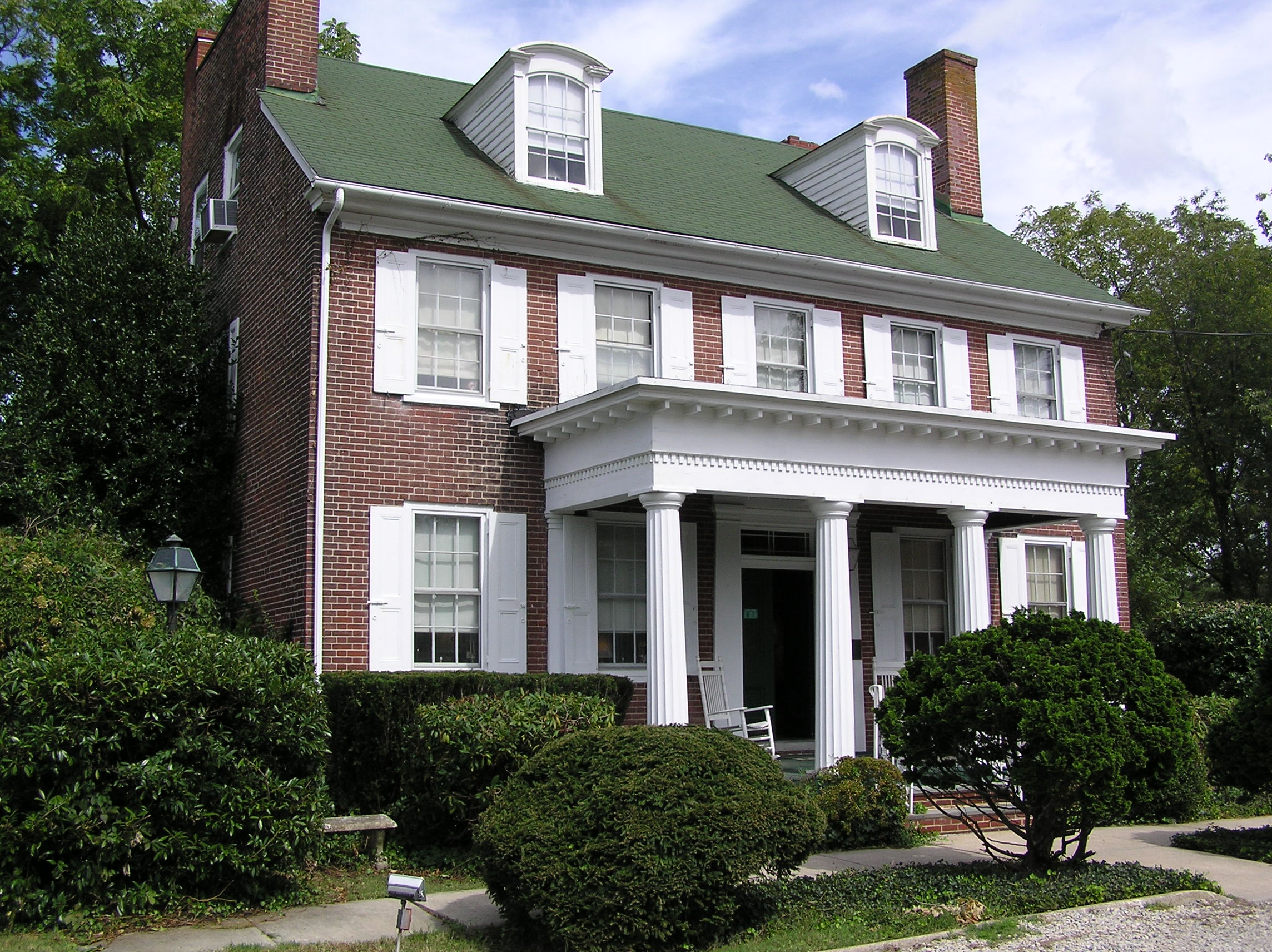
- The Stokes–Evans House in 2012

- Location within Burlington County, New Jersey Location within New Jersey Location within the United States
- Location: 52 East Main Street, Marlton, New Jersey
- Coordinates: 39°53′26″N 74°55′03″W
- Built: 1842
- Built by: Isaac Stokes
- Architectural style: Federal, Greek Revival
- NRHP reference No.: 94001009
- NJRHP No.: 808

Significant dates
- Added to NRHP: August 30, 1994
- Designated NJRHP: June 28, 1994

The Stokes–Evans House, also known as the Harvest House Mansion, is located at 52 East Main Street in the Marlton section of Evesham Township in Burlington County, New Jersey, United States. The brick structure was built in 1842 by Isaac Stokes and features Federal and Greek Revival architecture. Three other prominent Quaker citizens of Marlton, Ezra Evans and Henry and Mark Lippincott, also owned and occupied this house. It was added to the National Register of Historic Places on August 30, 1994, for its significance in architecture, commerce, and politics/government.

== See also ==
- National Register of Historic Places listings in Burlington County, New Jersey
