= Lott (surname) =

Lott is a surname, and may refer to:

- Andre Lott (born 1979), American football player
- Annika Lott (born 1999), German handball player
- Barbara Lott (1920–2002), British actress
- Bernice Lott (1930–2022), American social psychologist
- Billy Lott (1934–1995), American football player
- Bret Lott (born 1958), American novelist and academic
- Bushrod W. Lott (1826–1886), American Minnesota Territory politician
- Charles Fayette Lott (1824–1918), American politician and judge in California
- Charles Francis Lott (1781–1866), American physician
- Charlie Lott, New Zealand army officer
- Colton Lott (born 1995), Canadian curler
- Cornelius P. Lott (1798–1850), American LDS leader
- David Lott, British politician
- Dawn Lott, American applied mathematician
- Derek Lott (1953–2011), British entomologist and museum curator
- Derrick Lott (born 1990), American gridiron football player
- Edson Schuyler Lott II (1905–1992), American football player
- Elisha Everett Lott (1820–1864), American politician
- Emmeline Lott (fl.1866), British travel writer
- Eric Lott (born 1959), American cultural historian and academic
- Eric J. Lott (born 1934), English religious scholar
- Felicity Lott (1947–2026), English soprano
- George Lott (1906–1991), American tennis player and coach
- Hank Lott (born 1974), American politician
- Hans-Peter Lott (born 1969), German long jumper
- Harry Lott (American politician) (fl.1870), African-American politician in Louisiana
- Harry Lott (rower) (1880–1949), American rower
- Harry Baines Lott (1781–1833), English politician
- Henrique Teixeira Lott (1954–1960), Brazilian military officer and politician
- Honey Lott (Benjamin Lott; 1925–1980), American baseball player
- Hiram R. Lott (1829–1895), American politician
- Jack Lott (1920–1993), American big game hunter
- Jalen Lott, American football player
- James Lott (born 1965), American high jumper and football player
- Jeremy Lott (born 1978), American writer and pundit
- Jerry Lott (1938–1983), American rockabilly musician
- Jesse Lott (1943–2023), American artist
- Jodi Lott (born 1971), American politician from Georgia
- Johannes Lott (1930–2024), Estonian lawyer and politician
- John Lott (born 1958), American economist and commentator
- John A. Lott (1806–1878), American judge and politician from New York State
- John Lott (American football, born 1964) (born 1964), American football player and coach
- John Lott (mathematician) (born 1959), American mathematician
- Joseph B. Lott (fl.1873), American politician in Louisiana
- Juanita Tamayo Lott (born 1948), Filipina-American demographer, policy analyst and author
- Kadriana Lott (born 1999), Canadian curler
- Karl Lott (1901–1922), Swiss footballer
- Lafayette Joseph Lott (1863–1952), American politician from Mississippi
- Leon Lott (born 1953), American police officer
- Loren Lott (born 1992), American actress and singer
- Lucy Beall Lott (born 1998), American-British academic, activist and model
- Lyn Lott (1950–2018), American golfer
- Maria-Elisabeth Lott (born 1987), German violinist
- Mike Lott, American politician from Mississippi
- Milton Lott (1916–1996), American writer
- Nic Lott (born 1979), American politician
- Omarr Norman-Lott (born 2002), American football player
- Pixie Lott (Victoria Louise Pixie; born 1991), English singer
- Plummer Lott (born 1945), American basketball player and judge
- Ronnie Lott (born 1959), American football player
- Ryan Lott (born 1979), American musician
- Steve Lott (1950–2021), American boxing manager
- Steve Lott (politician) (born 1966), American politician
- Thaddeus S. Lott Sr. (1934–2015), American educator
- Thomas Lott (born 1957), American football player
- Tiffany Lott-Hogan (born 1975), American heptathlete
- Tim Lott (born 1956), British author
- Trent Lott (born 1941), American lawyer and politician from Mississippi
- Uriah Lott (1842–1915), American engineer
- Werner Lott (1907–1997), German U-boat commander
- William S. Lott (1918–2009), American judge

== See also ==
- Murder of Nadine Lott
- Lot (surname)
