= Lot (surname) =

Lot is a surname, and may refer to:

- David Obadiah Lot (1907–1995), Nigerian politician
- Ferdinand Lot (1866–1952), French historian
- Ghulam Mohammad Lot (c.1929–2019), Pakistani politician
- Gul Muhammad Lot, Pakistani politician
- Myrrha Lot-Borodine (1882–1954), Russian-French scholar of medieval literature
- Philippe Lot (born 1967), French rower

== See also ==
- Lott (surname)
