= Charles Lott =

Charles Lott may refer to:

- Charles Fayette Lott (1824–1918), California judge and state legislator
- Charles Francis Lott (1781–1866), New Jersey physician and surgeon in the War of 1812
- Charlie Lott (fl. 1978–2020s), New Zealand army officer
- Charles "Chuck" Lott, Jr, fictional character in the TV series Between
