= John Lott (disambiguation) =

John Lott (born 1958) is an American economist, political commentator, and gun rights advocate.

John Lott may also refer to:

- John A. Lott (1806–1878), American lawyer and politician
- John Lott (American football, born 1905) (1905–1992), American football tackle
- John Lott (American football, born 1964), American football offensive tackle and coach
- John Lott (mathematician) (born 1959) known for his contributions to differential geometry
