= Harry Lott =

Harry Lott may refer to:

- Harry Lott (rower) (1880–1949), American Olympic rower
- Harry Lott (American politician), member of the Louisiana House of Representatives
- Harry Baines Lott (1781–1833), English politician
