= Payal Kumar =

Multidisciplinary artist and activist

Payal Kumar (/pə.jəl/ PAA-YAL, Hindi: [पायल], better known by her pen name payal kumar) is an Indian-origin multidisciplinary cultural worker, sexual and reproductive health justice advocate, abortion doula, and organizer. Their (Note: kumar uses they/them pronouns.) work explores the in-between spaces of coloniality, trauma, queerness, and embodiment, through illustrations, zines, spoken word pieces, and workshops that invoke the power of intergenerational community building.

Currently based on Massachusett, Pawtucket, and Wampanoag territories, Kumar's visual work alchemizes Madhubani folk art from their ancestral villages in Bihar with traditional Americana motifs to amplify grassroots movements. They were 2021 recipient of the Boston Foundation's LAB grant and part of the 2024-25 cohort of Harvard Ed Portal's Artist Pipeline Program.

== Early life, education, and activism ==
Kumar graduated from University of Chicago in 2017 with a major in biology (Neuroscience specialization) and Philosophy. During this time, they were a board member of the PanAsia Solidarity Coalition, community leader with Asian Americans Advancing Justice, collective member of Chicago Desi Youth Rising (winner of National Queer Asian Pacific Islanders Alliance's 2017 Community Catalyst Award), and coalition organiser with R3 Chicago. Kumar volunteered for DisO-Aides, a student-organized set of programs and resources, contributing a chapter on Intersectionality for the 2016 UChicago Disorientation Book. They were part of Apsara, an Indian Classical Dance student-collective, that collaborated with University Theater (UT) for Nari, exploring aspects of worship, femininity, struggles, and the dichotomy between goddesses and women in South Asia. They also performed Buchaechum, a traditional Korean fan dance, for UChicago Korean Student Organization's 35th Annual Culture Show.

Kumar briefly worked as a neurobiology researcher at Harvard Medical School, co-authoring a peer-reviewed paper entitled Caveolae in CNS arterioles mediate neurovascular coupling that sheds light on how the brain communicates with its arteries to ensure adequate blood flow to areas of heightened neural activity. The experiment, conducted by Department of Neurobiology's Gu Lab of which Kumar was a member, found that vasodilation or the widening of blood vessels, is largely mediated by endothelial cells that actively relay signals to smooth muscle cells (SMCs) from the central nervous through a caveolae-dependent pathway.

Kumar advocated for the 2018 amendment of Illinois SB0035, known as the Immigration Safe Zones Act, that prohibits law enforcement from assisting or supporting immigration enforcement operations without a valid criminal warrant, and removes citizenship or immigration status questions from forms related to benefits, opportunities, or services provided by the state or public schools.

At the weekly scheduled meeting of the Cambridge City Council in the Sullivan Chamber, they voiced support for the council's resolution on the 2019 Citizenship Amendment Act (CAA) of India. The resolution, which passed unanimously, identified CAA as a "racist" and “repressive” policy “inconsistent with Cambridge’s values as a city that welcomes South Asian communities of all castes and religions.” It called upon the Indian Parliament to repeal CAA and abolish the National Register of Citizens (NRC) to “uphold the constitution.” During the public comment section of the Council meeting, Kumar, then Cambridge resident, said: “This city is the home of illustrious institutions like Harvard and MIT, the upcoming internationally renowned Harvard India Conference, incredible community leaders, and a legacy of innovation.”

Kumar signed an Ambedkar King Study Circle solidarity statement supporting the legal proceedings initiated by the State of California’s Department of Fair Employment and Housing (DFEH) against Cisco Systems for discriminating against a Dalit engineer. The statement urged American companies, including those in Silicon Valley, to integrate caste-based discrimination as unfair and punishable in their Human Resource policies.

While managing health equity at Planned Parenthood League of Massachusetts (PPLM) in 2022, Kumar was involved in the unionizing effort to help ensure that "[PPLM] frontline staff were respected, and that management did not hold a monopoly on decision-making." Nearly 200 workers at four PPLM clinics in Boston, Worcester, Marlborough, Springfield and the Telehealth unit voted to join the 1199SEIU United Healthcare Workers East union that summer. “It feels more important than ever now that the Roe v. Wade decision [which previously guaranteed the right to abortion in the U.S.] has been overturned," Kumar said, "We are also seeing an alarming number of attacks on trans rights around the country, including restricting access to such mainstream treatments as HRT [hormone replacement therapy].” At PPLM, they rallied for equitable healthcare access within the organization, including helping new 1199SEIU members negotiate a contract which ensures more time with each patient to improve the clinicians’ ability to build trust and dispense appropriate treatment.

== Career ==
=== Exhibitions ===
Kumar's mixed-media painting there is no here / there is no there was part of Liberation Ties: Stories from the Diaspora (2024), an exhibition featuring local artists, culture workers, community organizers, and activists from New England and New York. The exhibition, mounted at Trade Gallery (Nottingham, NH) in partnership with Stay Silent PVD, Peter Crowley, and Trade Providence, focused on "connecting global decolonial struggles between communities of the diaspora" through the "collective reimagining of justice and liberation." It was accompanied by events to foster community building, learning, organizing, and engagement, including art-making workshops and panels.

Kumar was one of the featured artists for Call and Response: Illustration in Uncertain Times (2023) curated by Leslie Condon for Pao Arts Center. The exhibition brought together posters, cartoons, and other print media by seven local Asian American and Pacific Islanders (AAPI) artists, underscoring the need for radical community care. Three of Kumar's prints, including bite the hand that feeds you, we keep us safe and collective intention were on display. The originals were created using watercolour, ink, acrylic, and chai on a cotton rag, with accompanying text in bold and serifed font reminiscent of revolutionary block print. Kumar was inspired by "the wisdom of communities on the margins" who survived racism and colonialism. "I was really thinking about how we could unearth and excavate a lot of our ancestral memories of collective care and survival and power," they shared, "and put them into practice and alchemize mutual aid."

Kumar's meditations on misgendering was part of Trans* Futures Archive (2021), an international showcase of trans and nonbinary artists from across the Global South curated by After Party Collective and hosted at International Studio in Brooklyn, NY.

In 2020, six of Kumar's works, Decolonize Yr Thirst, kulfi, white supremacy is a weapon of mass destruction (after james baldwin and tony morrison), dowry, haanji, and bite, were displayed at Not Your Model Minority Pandemic, Proximity, and Power curated by Marjorie Lee at STAMP Gallery-University of Maryland. The mixed-media art exhibition was a response to rise in anti-Asian rhetoric and violence, particularly the xenophobic Chinese virus narratives that became commonplace during the pandemic. The exhibition also shed light on the "critical self-evaluation of Asian-American positionality in the movement for Black Lives and earlier histories of Black and Asian solidarities."

Using acrylic, watercolor, and ink, Kumar created Rituals of Joy for In-Between Spaces (2019), an inaugural popup exhibition curated by Creatives of Color Boston and hosted at Make Shift Boston. The exhibition featured six visual artists, including Kumar, who explored the theme of code-switching and cultural identity through their work.

Kumar was the featured visual artist at Melanin Pride Festival (2020), a renaissance in celebration and recognition of LGBTQI+ people of color in film and visual arts. The event was curated by Shaunya Thomas of Lesbians of Color Symposium (LOCS) Collective and co-hosted by the Museum of Fine Arts (Boston, MA), ArtsEmerson, Brattle Theatre, Roxbury Innovation Center, and Wicked Queer. Three of Kumar's works, Decolonize Yr Thirst, Suraj/Chaand, and colonialism only loosens its hold when the knife is at its throat (for kashmir), were displayed at the venue.

For their exhibition body of work (2025) hosted by Harvard Ed Portal at Crossings Gallery, Kumar uses a combination of paintings, textiles, zines, and poetry to explore "care, medicalization, and the limits of bodily autonomy in a world shaped by capitalism, colonialism, and generational trauma." Inspired by North Indian folk traditions and protective talismans, Kumar's work braids together their journey as both caregiver and patient, and invites viewers to reimagine "our bodies as vessels of connection rather than limitation."

=== Spoken word performances ===
In 2017, Alphawood Gallery Chicago, in conjunction with the exhibition Then They Came for Me: Incarceration of Japanese Americans during WWII and the Demise of Civil Liberties, organized a series of public programs, including panel discussions, teach-ins, live performances, film screenings, workshops, and hands-on activist activities. On June 29, as part of the Art, Now. Act, Now: Know Your Rights segment of Then They Came for Me, Kumar performed an abolitionist spoken word poetry. Between 2018 and 2023, their spoken word performances exploring tradition and transformation were part of a Museum of Fine Arts in Boston showcase.

ForThey Watch You Thrive (2021), a collaborative series supported by a Live Arts Boston grant from the Boston Foundation, Arts Connect International, Pao Arts Center, and The Theatre Offensive, Kumar showcased a durational performance exploring queer lineage through folkloric monsters and ancestral spirits. Their multimedia performance on diasporic ritual and memory, featuring spoken word, scent, and musical accompaniment, was part of Visions/Voices (2022), an outdoor performance series in partnership with the Rose Kennedy Greenway Conservancy and Pao Arts Center. Kumar also performed for Harvard Ed Portal's feelings are data (2022) community celebration.

For Outspoken Saturdays (2023), a televised community spoken word showcase held at the Boston Public Library through GBH Studios, Kumar performed A Poem for Aunties. Their multimedia and multilingual spoken word set focusing on decolonial dreams and cultural resistance grounded in Kashmir was featured in First Thursday (2024) at the Isabella Stewart Gardner Museum.

=== Zines, illustrations, and other projects ===
In 2015, Kumar's illustration biological essentialism is violence was featured in Midway Journal Volume 18, Issue 1 to fundraise for Brave Space Alliance. For Creatives of Colour's inaugural pop-up exhibition In-Between Spaces at Makeshift Boston, Kumar was one of the featured artists interpreting "the theme of code-switching in a myriad of interesting ways." They conducted a workshop Speculative Fashion: building new worlds through what we wear alongside Xilli Rose at No Nation Chicago. Kumar created an illustration for Everything Is Going Wrong! Comics on Punk and Mental Illness, a comic anthology edited by Mark Bouchard featuring more than forty comics and essays. The anthology tackled themes of suicide and suicide ideation, alcoholism and drug dependence, anxiety, abuse, claustrophobia, and physical illness at the nexus of gender, sexuality, and bodily autonomy. It was successfully funded on Kickstarter in May 2018. Proceeds from the book support The Trevor Project. The same year, they conducted a workshop, Imagination as a research tool, alongside educator, visual artist, and cultural organizer Nina Bhattacharya at Allied Media Conference in Detroit, MI.

In their 2019 presentation showcase Our Ancestors were Cyborgs and so are We for The Augment the Human Party event, Kumar focused on electronic- and non-electronic technology as a way to augment the human. They "explored the idea that the categories of human, technology, posthuman and cyborg may be more complex than we thought and that perhaps we have always been cyborgs." They designed the EP cover for singer Ava Sophia's To See and Hear Hxrself.

Kumar was the keynote speaker for the Fuel: The Revolution event organized by Asian American Student Union at the University of Maryland, College Park (UMCP AASU) in 2020. They also conducted a workshop entitled Reclaiming Imagination: An Exploration Into the Worlds We Want for School of Arts and Social Justice at Make Shift Boston.

They were a panellist on Northeastern University Writing Center's roundtable #WhyIWrite. Kumar, alongside United Front Against Displacement organiser Ryan Costello, delivered Writing the Worlds We Want, a two-part workshop at Northeastern University's College of Social Sciences and Humanities. They were invited by Los Angeles County African American Infant and Maternal Mortality Prevention Initiative for a panel on racial healing through wellness and activism, and Association of Latino Professionals for America (ALPFA) for a panel on health advocacy. Kumar worked on Guiding Lights, a window installation with Melody Hsu for Experience Chinatown at Boston Chinatown Neighborhood Center.

In 2022, Kumar created cover design and graphics for Boston Compass newspaper issue No. 148 presented by Creatives of Color Boston. They also created the cover image for Duke University Press' Journal of Lesbian and Gay Studies (2023), and designed the flyer for Subdrift Boston x Dunamis JP Porchfest (2023) Community Stage.

In 2023, Kumar donated postcard-sized artworks for A Solidarity Reading & Art Auction for Palestine in support of Palestine Legal; organised by Global Feminists for Palestine and Asian American Writers’ Workshop. They were a panellist for two events that year:

- Feminist Utopias organized by The Consortium for Graduate Studies in Gender, Culture, Women, and Sexuality (GCWS) at Massachusetts Institute of Technology and;
- Articulating Abortion organised in collaboration with My Sister’s Keeper, Hermana Unidas, LBGTQ+ ERG, MIT History, Libraries, Office of Minority Education, The Creative Women of Knowledge, Institute Community & Equity Office, The Women & Gender Services Program and the Women & Gender Studies Program. Kumar also conducted workshop on Medical Abolition for Boston Children’s Hospital at Lucy Parson Center.

Kumar was a consultant for the community engagement vertical of City of Boston's Un-monument | Re-monument | De-monument: Transforming Boston (2024), a multi-year program, funded by a $3 million grant from the Mellon Foundation. Kumar developed strategies to encourage continued citizen dialogue about Boston's monuments, public art, democracy, and culture. The same year, they were a featured speaker for Museum of Fine Arts Boston's The City Talks: South Asian Representation. They also designed a t-shirt for National Network on Cuba's 17th International May Day Brigade, and temporary tattoo and sticker sheets for Global Grassroots Justice Alliance.

In 2025, Kumar created Radical Timeline of South Asians in the U.S., a collaborative timeline documenting moments of radical growth and identity formation of South Asian history in the United States.

== Awards and recognition ==
- Recipient of 2024 Harvard Ed Portal Artist Pipeline Program grant, a program for early-career artists who live and/or work in the Allston-Brighton neighborhood to gain boots-on-the-ground skills and receive individualized support.
- Recipient of 2021 Boston Foundation's Live Arts Boston (LAB) grant.
- 2020 Mango and Marigold Press artist-in-residence.
