= Juanita Tamayo Lott =

Filipina-American demographer, policy analyst and author (born 1948)

Juanita Tamayo Lott (born 1948) is a Filipina-American author and activist. A chronicler of the Filipino experience in America, Lott has authored several popular and scholarly works on Asian Americans. She has also contributed to the establishment of several Asian American studies departments. As a college student in 1969, Lott co-founded the first U.S. Filipino American Studies Program at San Francisco State; in 2007, she developed the Filipino American Studies Program at the University of Maryland, College Park. Trained as a statistician and demographer, she spent her career as a policy analyst for the federal government.

== Education and life ==
Juanita Tamayo Lott moved to San Francisco from the Philippines on June 20, 1951, with her mother, Anicia Lucas Tamayo, and sister, Veronica. Lott's father, Lazaro Lorenza Tamayo, had moved to San Francisco from the Philippines in 1922 as a Filipino national. Lott's brother, William Robert, was born in San Francisco after her family's arrival.

Lott attended San Francisco State College and participated in the 1968 Third World Liberation Front Strikes, which resulted in the establishment of the School of Ethnic Studies. In 1969, still a student, Lott co-founded the first U.S. Filipino American Studies Program at San Francisco State. She graduated with a degree in Sociology in 1970 and went on to graduate school at the University of Chicago.

In 1973 she married Robert Henry Lott (1948-2008) and moved to Washington, D.C. They had two children, David Tamayo Lott and Joseph Henry Lott III.

== Career ==
From 1969 to 1971, she was a member of the planning committee for the School of Ethnic Studies at San Francisco State College, co-chair of the Filipino Studies Program, and special assistant to the Dean.

In 1973, Lott took a job with the United States Census Bureau as an analyst. From 1974 to 1977, she directed the Asian American Affairs Division of the United States Department of Health, Education, and Welfare (DHEW) and was that Department's representative to the Office of Management and Budget (OMB) Federal Agency Council for the 1980 United States census. Later, from 1978 to 1982, she worked for the U.S. Commission on Civil Rights as deputy director of the Women's Rights Program Unit and director of the Program Analysis Division. From 1986 to 1987, Lott chaired the Census Bureau Advisory Committee on Asian and Pacific Islander Populations for the 1990 United States census. Lott was also appointed as a special assistant to Director Martha Farnsworth Riche of the Census Bureau.

Since 1976, Lott has written numerous publications on democratic shifts. In 2007, she developed the Filipino American Studies Program at the University of Maryland, College Park. She retired from her government positions in 2008.

== Publications ==
In addition to a number of reports, articles, conference proceedings, and government studies and publications, Lott authored the following books:

- Juanita Tamayo Lott, Asian Americans: From Racial Category to Multiple Identities (London: SAGE, 1989).
- Juanita Tamayo Lott, Common Destiny: Filipino American Generations (Lanham, MD: Rowman & Littlefield, 2006).
- Rita M. Cacas and Juanita Tamayo Lott, Filipinos in Washington, D.C. (Charleston, SC: Arcadia Pub, 2009).
- Juanita Tamayo Lott, Golden Children: Legacy of Ethnic Studies, SF State (Berkeley: Eastwind Books of Berkeley, 2018).
