= Rex Marshall =

American actor and announcer (1919–1983)

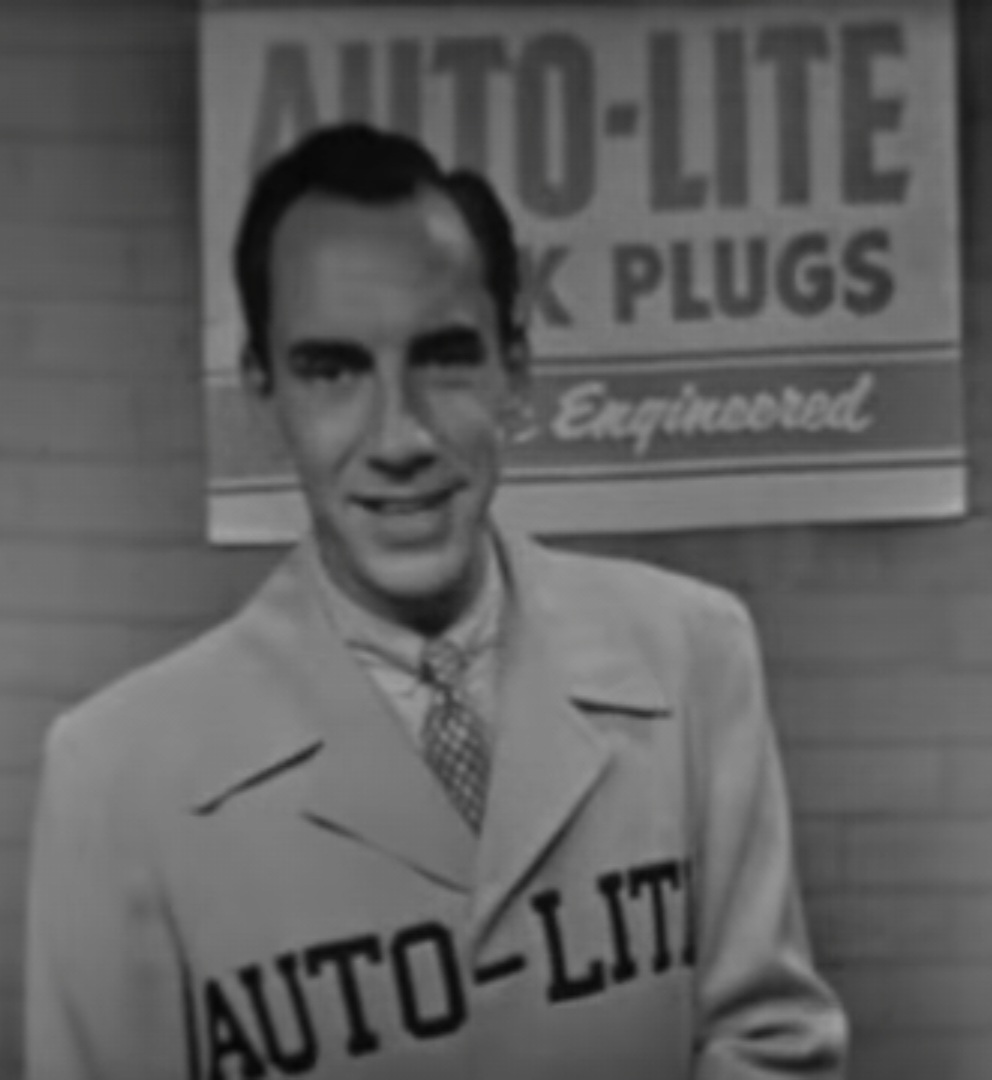
- Marshall in Suspense (1952)
- Born: Marshall Bingeman Shantz, Jr. January 10, 1919; Pemberton, New Jersey, U.S.
- Died: March 9, 1983 (aged 64); White River Junction, Vermont, U.S.
- Occupations: Actor, Announcer
- Years active: 1937–1983
- Political party: Republican
- Spouse: Barbara Dykeman Marshall
- Children: 4

Rex Marshall (born Marshall Bingeman Shantz, Jr. January 10, 1919 – March 9, 1983) was an American actor, television announcer, and a radio personality for 46 years. His career began in Boston, Massachusetts, as a reporter for a radio station and ended in White River Junction, Vermont, as the owner of his own radio station.

Marshall's most memorable role was as the host and announcer of the anthology television drama series Suspense from 1949–1954. He was also remembered as an announcer on the radio, spokesman for the Reynolds Aluminum Company for 25 years and as the spokesman for the Maxwell House coffee brand.

== Early life and career ==
Marshall was born on January 10, 1919, in Pemberton, New Jersey, to parents Marshall Bingeman Shantz, Sr. and Hermione Shantz. Marshall was the oldest of four children. He had a younger brother, George T. Shantz, and two younger sisters: Valrie and Hermione. Drafted into the Army, Marshall was a pilot instructor for the Army Air Corps at the beginning of World War II; later in the war, he flew the amphibious PBY in the Pacific theater, attaining the rank of captain.

=== Radio ===
Marshall began his career as an announcer for a Boston radio station in 1937.

=== Television ===
In 1948, Marshall helped to erect WPIX-TV (Channel 11) in New York. He was also the first staff announcer for the station. That same year, Marshall hosted the Republican National Convention. In 1949, Marshall left his employment at WPIX-TV to work as a freelance advertising spokesman. He returned to the station in 1967 to anchor its 10 O'Clock Evening News. He left the next year.

==== Suspense ====
In 1949, Marshall became the host of a new television anthology drama titled Suspense. It was based on the radio program of the same name. The series broadcast a new suspense-drama every week. The show was sponsored by the Auto-Lite Corporation. It aired on the CBS Television Network for six seasons and 260 episodes, between January 6, 1949 – August 17, 1954. Of the 260 episodes, Marshall appeared in only 75, but Suspense is regarded as his most memorable appearance.

==== Other works ====
Throughout the 1950s, Marshall did other work in television, principally as an announcer.

During 1950–51, Marshall was the second announcer on the game show Blind Date, (also known as Your Big Moment). He was also the announcer for the sports broadcast The Herman Hickman Show during its one-season run in 1952–53. Marshall was announcer for the Easter Parade of the Stars Auto Show. In 1957, he was an announcer on The Jack Paar Show.

== Later years ==
=== WNHV ===
In 1965, Marshall purchased an existing AM radio property, WVTR, licensed to operate at White River Junction, Vermont. He had the call letters changed to WNHV 910 AM Radio. Marshall actively managed WNHV until his death.

The station used to play music but in 2000, the station changed its format and the station became an ESPN Radio affiliate. It remained a sports station until its operations ceased on May 5, 2010. Its license was deleted by the Federal Communications Commission on September 12, 2011.

=== Endorsements ===
Marshall did many endorsements for several different products and companies.

During the run of Suspense, Marshall endorsed Auto-Lite spark plugs, which sponsored the program.

For 25 years, Marshall was the spokesperson for the Reynolds Aluminum Company. He was seen in live network television commercials in Reynolds-sponsored programs such as Mister Peepers, which ran between 1952 and 1955.

Marshall was the first spokesman for Gleem toothpaste starting from its product release in 1954. He also endorsed coffee for the Maxwell House Coffee brand, and gasoline for the Standard Oil Corporation.

== Personal life ==
Marshall married Barbara Dykeman in 1942. They had four children; two sons: Peter and Jeffrey, and two daughters: Pamela and Jamie.

== Death ==
On Tuesday, March 8, 1983, Marshall was sitting at his desk at WNHV, the station that he had owned for 18 years, in White River Junction, Vermont, when, suddenly, he suffered a heart attack. He was rushed to the Veterans Administration hospital in White River where he died on March 9, 1983. He was 64 years old.

== Filmography ==
Year	Title	Role	Notes
1949–1953	Suspense	Presenter	Appeared in 75 episodes
1949	Blind Date	Announcer	
1950	Kuda Bux, Hindu Mystic	Announcer	
1950	Tom Corbett, Space Cadet	Lieutenant Saunders	3 episodes
1950–1952	The Adventures of Ellery Queen	Announcer	Announced 47 episodes
1951	Circuit Rider	Narrator	
1952	Tales of Tomorrow	Host / Pitchman	
1952	Mister Peepers	Pitchman	
