= Suspense (American TV series) =

American anthology TV series

- Genre: Anthology drama
- Directed by: Robert Mulligan (1952–54); Byron Paul (1953); John Peyser (1950); Robert Stevens (1949–52)
- Presented by: Rex Marshall
- Composers: Henry (Hank) Sylvern; Bernard Herrmann
- Country of origin: United States
- Original language: English
- No. of seasons: 6
- No. of episodes: 260

Production
- Executive producer: William Dozier (1953)
- Producers: Robert Stevens (1949–52); John Peyser (1950); Martin Manulis (1952–54); David Heilweil (1954)
- Running time: 25 min. (1949 pilot episode); 30 min. (March 1, 1949–Aug. 17, 1954)

Original release
- Network: CBS
- Release: 6 January 1949 – 17 August 1954

Suspense is an American television anthology series that ran on CBS Television from 1949 to 1954. It was adapted from the radio program of the same name which ran from 1942 to 1962. A short-lived revival was then televised briefly on CBS in 1964.

== Series overview ==
The show was broadcast live from New York City to stations on CBS's eastern and midwestern networks. Kinescope recordings were made for transmission via KTTV in Hollywood. It was sponsored by the Auto-Lite corporation, and each episode was introduced by host Rex Marshall, who promoted Auto-Lite spark plugs, car batteries, headlights, and other car parts.

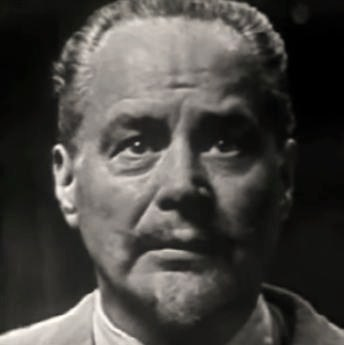
Romney Brent in the episode "A Cask of Amontillado" (1949)

Some of the early scripts were adapted from Suspense radio scripts, while others were original for television. Like the radio program, many scripts were adaptations of literary classics by well-known authors. Classic authors such as Edgar Allan Poe, Agatha Christie, and Charles Dickens all had stories adapted for the series, while contemporary authors such as Roald Dahl and Gore Vidal also contributed. Many notable actors appeared on the program, including Bela Lugosi, Boris Karloff, Cloris Leachman, Brian Keith, Franchot Tone, Robert Emhardt, Leslie Nielsen, Felicia Montealgre Bernstein and Lloyd Bridges.

The ninety existing episodes are available today on three DVD box sets. Tubi is also streaming episodes of the show.

In 1949, Marvel Comics began publishing Suspense comics licensed from CBS; a box on the cover of the first eleven issues (out of 29 total issues) read "Based on gripping CBS radio - television series".

== Critical response ==
A review in The New York Times of the program's premiere episode, "Revenge", commended the "great technical skill" of mixing filmed segments with live studio shots, a technique that the review labeled a "novel aspect". Beyond that, however, reviewer Jay Gould found little to like about the episode, which he wrote was "a badly contrived piece of trivia", described elsewhere in the review as having "a drab story and an inexcusably poor supporting cast". Even so, he wrote that with improvements "the mystery show should be a serviceable staple on video."

The trade publication Variety commented in a review of the same episode that "Suspense made an inauspicious debut" on television, comparing the episode to a B film. The reviewer blamed a "weakly motivated" adaptation for causing the direction and acting to suffer. Robert Stevens, who produced and directed, was cited for failing to add excitement to an already weak script.

== Episodes ==
=== Season 1 (1948–1949) ===
No. in series	No. in season	Title	Writer	Guest Stars	Original air date	Notes
1	1	"Goodbye New York"	Cornell Woolrich	Meg Mundy	January 6, 1949	
Departing New York by train, Mary Gardner (Meg Mundy), worries that a mysterious man (Gage Clarke) is following her while she waits for her husband, Ray. In a flashback, Mary returns to her apartment, and runs into the superintendent (Philip Coolidge), who demands the back rent. She manages to stall for time, but smells gas as she enters the apartment. Mary discovers Ray collapsed on the floor, but revives him. Ray cannot find work and has been blacklisted by his former employer. Wondering where Mary has gotten money for groceries, she reveals that she has pawned her wedding ring. Ashamed, Ray hurriedly leaves the apartment. Mary follows him but stops when she sees a suspicious-looking man eyeing her. Ray returns later that evening with $500. The next morning, the couple read about the murder of Ray's boss in the newspaper, and Mary, realizing what has happened, decides that they must leave the city. At Grand Central Station they board the train separately to avoid suspicion. Flashing forward to the present, Ray catches up with Mary on the train. The mysterious man is then revealed to be sitting in front of them, and as the tickets are being collected, he flashes a badge to the conductor.
2	2	"Revenge"	Cornell Woolrich	Eddie Albert; Margo	March 1, 1949	based on the 1943 novel The Black Path of Fear
3	3	"Suspicion"	Sylvia Berger & Dorothy L. Sayers	Ernest Truex; Sylvia Field; Ruth McDevitt	March 15, 1949	previously adapted for Suspense radio show on 12 August 1942, 10 February 1944, & 3 April 1948.
A couple has separate health issues. One of them is arsenic.
4	4	"Cabin B-13"	John Dickson Carr	Charles Korvin; Eleanor Lynn	March 29, 1949	previously adapted for Suspense radio on 13 March 1943 & 9 November 1943. In 1948 it inspired its own short-lived radio program.
5	5	"The Man Upstairs"	Cornell Woolrich	Mildred Natwick; Anthony Ross	April 5, 1949	
6	6	"After Dinner Story"	Cornell Woolrich	Otto Kruger	April 12, 1949	previously adapted for Suspense radio on 26 October 1943.
7	7	"The Creeper"	Frank Gabrielson & Joseph Ruscoll	Nina Foch; Anthony Ross	April 19, 1949	
8	8	"A Night at an Inn"	Lord Dunsany & Halsted Welles	Boris Karloff; Anthony Ross; Jack Manning; Barry Macollum; Joan Stanley	April 26, 1949	
A pilot flies unknown shipments to a mystery spot in the Arctic.						
9	9	"Dead Ernest"	Reginald Denham, Seeleg Lester, & Mary Orr	Margaret Phillips; Tod Andrews; Will Hare; Patricia Jenkins	May 3, 1949	previously performed on Suspense radio on 8 August 1946, 8 May 1947, & 24 March 1949.
Ernest Bowers suffers an attack of catalepsy while crossing the street, lapsing into a coma that resembles death. Believing he was killed by a passing car, his body is sent to the city morgue. His coat, with a note in the pocket describing his medical condition, is taken by the owner of a secondhand clothing store and quickly sold. The couple who purchase the jacket finds the note and begins a race to save Ernest from a premature embalming.
10	10	"Post Mortem"	Cornell Woolrich & Frank Gabrielson	Sidney Blackmer; Peggy Conklin; Richard Coogan; Julian Noa	May 10, 1949	previously performed on Suspense radio program on 4 April 1946.
Following the sudden death of her husband, Josie marries Doc Archer, the man named beneficiary of her husband's life insurance policy. Investigator Westcott is suspicious after learning the doctor has a history of collecting such payouts. Westcott informs Josie that she is in danger of becoming her husband's next heavily insured "accident." She doesn't believe him—until she's almost killed when Doc "accidentally" knocks a sunlamp into the tub while she's bathing.
11	11	"The Monkey's Paw"	Frank Gabrielson & W.W. Jacobs	Boris Karloff; Mildred Natwick	May 17, 1949	
12	12	"Murder Through the Looking Glass"	Reginald Denham, Mary Orr, & Craig Rice	William Prince; Peter von Zerneck	May 24, 1949	performed for Suspense radio program 17 March 1949.
13	13	"The Doors on the Thirteenth Floor"	Edward Mabley & Marie Rodell	Louisa Horton Hill; Anthony Ross; Russell Collins; Nell Harrison; Douglass Watson	May 31, 1949	
Elderly Agatha Leighton returns from a trip to find her apartment on the thirteenth floor has been robbed. As she attempts to call the police, someone grabs her. Sally, who lives down the hall, attempts to visit the old lady as she'd promised, but finds she's been locked in her apartment and the phone is dead. Through the door's peephole, she sees the building's desk clerk leaving Agatha's apartment. Sally realizes something bad has happened to the old lady.
14	14	"The Yellow Scarf"	Thomas Burke & Halsted Welles	Boris Karloff; Felicia Montealegre; Russell Collins; Douglass Watson	June 7, 1949	
15	15	"Help Wanted"	Reginald Denham, Stanley Ellin, & Mary Orr	Otto Kruger; D.A. Clarke-Smith; Peggy French; George Mathews; Ruth McDevitt	June 14, 1949	later adapted as an episode of Alfred Hitchcock Presents on 1 April 1956.
16	16	"Stolen Empire"	James Sheehan & Halsted Welles	Audrey Christie; Ken Lynch	June 21, 1949	
17	17	"The Hands of Mr. Ottermole"	Thomas Burke & Frank Gabrielson	Ralph Bell	June 28, 1949	

=== Season 2 (1949–1950) ===
- 6 Sep. 1949 - "Lunch Box"
- 13 Sep. 1949 - "Collector's Item"
- 20 Sep. 1949 - "Dr. Jekyll and Mr. Hyde"
- 27 Sep. 1949 - "The Comic Strip Murder"
- 4 Oct. 1949 - "Dr. Violet"
- 11 Oct. 1949 - "A Cask of Amontillado" starring Bela Lugosi
- 18 Oct. 1949 - "The Serpent Ring"
- 25 Oct. 1949 - "The Murderer"
- 1 Nov. 1949 - "Black Passage" based on the story "Olalla" by Robert Louis Stevenson
- 8 Nov. 1949 - "Suspicion"
- 15 Nov. 1949 - "The Thin Edge of Violence" starring George Reeves
- 22 Nov. 1949 - "The Third One"
- 29 Nov. 1949 - "Man in the House"
- 6 Dec. 1949 - "The Scar"
- 13 Dec. 1949 - "The Gray Helmet"
- 20 Dec. 1949 - "The Seeker and the Sought"
- 27 Dec. 1949 - "The Case of Lady Sannox"
- 3 Jan. 1950 - "Morning Boat to Africa"
- 10 Jan. 1950 - "The Bomber Command" starring George Reeves
- 17 Jan. 1950 - "Summer Storm"
- 24 Jan. 1950 - "The Horizontal Man"
- 31 Jan. 1950 - "The Distant Island"
- 7 Feb. 1950 - "Escape This Night"
- 14 Feb. 1950 - "The Suicide Club" based on the stories by Robert Louis Stevenson
- 21 Feb. 1950 - "Roman Holiday"
- 28 Feb. 1950 - "The Man Who Talked in His Sleep"
- 7 Mar. 1950 - "The Ledge"
- 14 Mar. 1950 - "The Parcel"
- 21 Mar. 1950 - "My Old Man's Badge"
- 28 Mar. 1950 - "The Second Class Passenger"
- 4 Apr. 1950 - "1000 To One"
- 11 Apr. 1950 - "Steely, Steely Eyes"
- 18 Apr. 1950 - "Murder at the Mardi Gras" starring George Reeves
- 25 Apr. 1950 - "The Gentleman from America"
- 2 May 1950 - "Death of a Dummy"
- 9 May 1950 - "Red Wine"
- 16 May 1950 - "One and One's a Lonesome"
- 23 May 1950 - "Photo Finish"
- 30 May 1950 - "Listen, Listen" Mildred Natwick
- 6 Jun. 1950 - "Black Bronze" Franchot Tone
- 13 Jun. 1950 - "I'm No Hero"
- 27 Jun. 1950 - "Wisteria Cottage" Conrad Janis, Marjorie Gateson

=== Season 3 (1950–1951) ===
- 29 August 1950 - "Poison"
- 5 September 1950 - "A Pocketful of Murder"
- 12 September 1950 - "Edge of Panic"
- 19 September 1950 - "Dark Shadows"
- 26 September 1950 - "Six to One"
- 3 October 1950 - "The Monkey's Paw"
- 10 October 1950 - "Criminals Mark" Catherine McLeod
- 17 October 1950 - "The Man Who Would Be King" Francis L. Sullivan
- 24 October 1950 - "Breakdown"
- 31 October 1950 - "Halloween Hold-Up"
- 7 November 1950 - "Nightmare"
- 14 November 1950 - "The Brush Off" George Reeves, Leslie Nielsen, Mary Sinclair
- 21 November 1950 - "The Death Cards"
- 28 November 1950 - "The Hands of Mr. Ottermole"
- 5 December 1950 - "The Guy from Nowhere"
- 12 December 1950 - "The Mallet"
- 19 December 1950 - "Dancing Dan's Christmas"
- 26 December 1950 - "The Tip"
- 2 January 1951 - "Death in a River"
- 9 January 1951 - "Tough Cop"
- 16 January 1951 - "The Fool's Heart" starring George Reeves
- 23 January 1951 - "Dead Fall"
- 30 January 1951 - "The Rose Garden"
- 6 February 1951 - "Night Break"
- 13 February 1951 - "Double Entry"
- 20 February 1951 - "The Victims"
- 27 February 1951 - "Margin for Safety"
- 6 March 1951 - "Dr. Jekyll and Mr. Hyde"
- 13 March 1951 - "On a Country Road"
- 20 March 1951 - "Telephone Call"
- 27 March 1951 - "The Three of Silence"
- 3 April 1951 - "Go Home Dead Man"
- 10 April 1951 - "The Foggy Night Visitor"
- 17 April 1951 - "The Juiceman" - Cloris Leachman, Robert Webber, Robert Emhardt
- 24 April 1951 - "Murderers' Meeting"
- 1 May 1951 - "No Friend Like an Old Friend"
- 8 May 1951 - "Murder in the Ring"
- 15 May 1951 - "Too Hot to Live"
- 22 May 1951 - "Escape This Night"
- 29 May 1951 - "Vamp Till Dead"
- 5 June 1951 - "The Call"
- 12 June 1951 - "De Mortuis"
- 19 June 1951 - "A Killing in Abilene"
- 26 June 1951 - "The Greatest Crime"
- 3 July 1951 - "Blood on the Trumpet"
- 10 July 1951 - "Tent on the Beach"
- 17 July 1951 - "Wisteria Cottage"
- 24 July 1951 - "The Incident at Story Point"
- 31 July 1951 - "A Vision of Death"
- 7 August 1951 - "Killers of the City"
- 14 August 1951 - "Death Sabre"
- 21 August 1951 - "This Is Your Confession: Part 1"
- 28 August 1951 - "This Is Your Confession: Part 2"
- 4 September 1951 - "This Way Out"
- 11 September 1951 - "Strange for a Killer"

=== Season 4 (1951–1952) ===
- 18 Sep. 1951 - "Merryman's Murder"
- 25 Sep. 1951 - "Doctor Anonymous"
- 2 Oct. 1951 - "Santa Fe Flight"
- 9 Oct. 1951 - "High Street"
- 16 Oct. 1951 - "The Fifth Dummy"
- 23 Oct. 1951 - "The Train from Czechoslovakia"
- 30 Oct. 1951 - "Court Day"
- 6 Nov. 1951 - "Moonfleet: Part 1"
- 13 Nov. 1951 - "Moonfleet: Part 2"
- 20 Nov. 1951 - "Frisco Payoff"
- 27 Nov. 1951 - "Mikki"
- 4 Dec. 1951 - "The Far-Off House"
- 11 Dec. 1951 - "Mediation in Mexico"
- 18 Dec. 1951 - "Pier 17"
- 25 Dec. 1951 - "The Lonely Place"
- 1 Jan. 1952 - "Routine Patrol"
- 8 Jan. 1952 - "Flare Week"
- 15 Jan. 1952 - "The Spider"
- 22 Jan. 1952 - "The Red Signal"
- 29 Jan. 1952 - "Death Drum" (starring Herbert Berghof & Maria Riva)
- 5 Feb. 1952 - "Betrayal in Vienna"
- 12 Feb. 1952 - "North of Shanghai"
- 19 Feb. 1952 - "Summer Night"
- 26 Feb. 1952 - "Night Drive"
- 4 Mar. 1952 - "Day of Infamy"
- 11 Mar. 1952 - "Four Days to Kill"
- 18 Mar. 1952 - "The Mystery of Edwin Drood: Part 1"
- 25 Mar. 1952 - "The Mystery of Edwin Drood: Part 2"
- 8 Apr. 1952 - "Black Panther"
- 15 Apr. 1952 - "Night of Evil"
- 22 Apr. 1952 - "Alibi Me"
- 29 Apr. 1952 - "The Purloined Letter"
- 6 May 1952 - "The Mandarin Murders"
- 13 May 1952 - "The Corsage"
- 20 May 1952 - "Hunted Down"
- 27 May 1952 - "The Debt"
- 3 Jun. 1952 - "Murder of Necessity"
- 10 Jun. 1952 - "House of Masks"
- 17 Jun. 1952 - "Phantom of the Riveria"
- 24 Jun. 1952 - "Night of Reckoning"
- 1 Jul. 1952 - "Fifty Beautiful Girls"
- 15 Jul. 1952 - "For the Love of Randi"
- 29 Jul. 1952 - "The Crooked Frame"
- 5 Aug. 1952 - "Death Cargo"
- 12 Aug. 1952 - "Remember Me?"
- 19 Aug. 1952 - "Her Last Adventure"
- 26 Aug. 1952 - "Woman in Love"
- 2 Sep. 1952 - "The Old Lady of Bayeux"
- 9 Sep. 1952 - "Call from a Killer"
- 16 Sep. 1952 - "The Return of Dr. Bourdette"
- 23 Sep. 1952 - "Set-Up for Death"
- 30 Sep. 1952 - "The Beach of Falesa"
- 7 Oct. 1952 - "The Man in the Mirror"

=== Season 5 (1952–1953) ===
- 14 October 1952 - "The Blue Panther" Phyllis Brooks, Michael Strong, Erik Rhodes, Gene Anton Jr., Bruce Gordon, Michael Garrett, Tom Avera, Gina Petrushka
- 21 October 1952 - "The Man Who Had Seven Hours" Robert Sterling, Gaby Rodgers, Walter Kohler, Ludie Claire, Susan Caubet, Marcel Hillaire, MacLean Savage
- 28 October 1952 - "All Hallow's Eve" - Franchot Tone, Francis Compton, Romney Brent, Patricia Byrd, Penny Hays, Douglas Jay, Bobby Catanio
- 11 November 1952 - "The Moving Target" Jason Smith, Irja Jensen, Joseph Anthony, Wolfe Barzell, Rudy Bond, Kalle Ruusumen, Jan DeRuth, Nina Hansen
- 18 November 1952 - "Monsieur Vidocq"
- 25 November 1952 - "The Whispering Killer"
- 2 December 1952 - "A Time of Innocence"
- 9 December 1952 - "The Girl Who Saw Tomorrow"
- 16 December 1952 - "The Tortured Hand"
- 23 December 1952 - "The Deadly Lamb"
- 30 December 1952 - "The Invisible Killer"
- 6 January 1953 - "Little Camorra"
- 13 January 1953 - "Mr. Matches" Warren Stevens, Henry Jones, Eleanor Wilson
- 20 January 1953 - "Vacancy for Death"
- 27 January 1953 - "Career"
- 3 February 1953 - "Mutiny Below"
- 10 February 1953 - "A Study in Stone"
- 17 February 1953 - "The Quarry"
- 24 February 1953 - "They Haven't Killed Me Yet"
- 3 March 1953 - "The Kiss-Off"
- 10 March 1953 - "The Legend of Lizzie"
- 17 March 1953 - "The Black Prophet"
- 24 March 1953 - "Portrait of Constance"
- 31 March 1953 - "Death in the Cave"
- 14 April 1953 - "Kiss Me Again, Stranger"
- 21 April 1953 - "The Duel"
- 28 April 1953 - "F.O.B. Vienna"
- 5 May 1953 - "The Suitor"
- 12 May 1953 - "The Death of an Editor"
- 19 May 1953 - "Come Into My Parlor"
- 26 May 1953 - "The Adventure of the Black Baronet"
- 2 June 1953 - "The Queen's Ring"
- 9 June 1953 - "The Man Who Cried Wolf"
- 16 June 1953 - "See No Evil"
- 23 June 1953 - "The Signal Man" - Boris Karloff, Alan Webb; based on the story by Charles Dickens
- 30 June 1953 - "The Fury of Señorita Gomez"
- 7 July 1953 - "The Mascot"
- 14 July 1953 - "The Dutch Schultz Story"
- 21 July 1953 - "Pigeons in the Cave"
- 28 July 1953 - "The Dance"
- 4 August 1953 - "Vial of Death"
- 11 August 1953 - "Point Blank"
- 18 August 1953 - "Nightmare at Ground Zero" by Rod Serling with O.Z. Whitehead, Louise Larabee, Pat Hingle
- 25 August 1953 - "Death in the Passing"
- 1 September 1953 - "Paradise Junction"
- 8 September 1953 - "Reign of Terror"
- 15 September 1953 - "The Darkest Night"
- 22 September 1953 - "The Riddle of Mayerling"

=== Season 6 (1953–1954) ===
- 29 September 1953 - "The Sister"
- 6 October 1953 - "Death at Skirkerud Pond"
- 13 October 1953 - "The Accounting"
- 20 October 1953 - "The Valley of the Kings"
- 27 October 1953 - "The Others"
- 3 November 1953 - "The Interruption"
- 10 November 1953 - "Needle in a Haystack"
- 17 November 1953 - "The Newcomer"
- 24 November 1953 - "My Short Walk to Freedom"
- 1 December 1953 - "Laugh It Off"
- 8 December 1953 - "The Dance"
- 15 December 1953 - "Cagliostro and the Chess Player"
- 22 December 1953 - "The Gift of Fear"
- 29 December 1953 - "Mr. Nobody"
- 5 January 1954 - "Diamonds in the Sky"
- 12 January 1954 - "The Scrap Iron Curtain"
- 19 January 1954 - "The Haunted"
- 26 January 1954 - "An Affair with a Ghost"
- 2 February 1954 - "The Man Who Wouldn't Talk"
- 9 February 1954 - "The Moonstone"
- 16 February 1954 - "The Execution"
- 23 February 1954 - "Death on the Screen"
- 2 March 1954 - "I Do Solemnly Swear"
- 9 March 1954 - "Before the Act"
- 16 March 1954 - "The Fourth Degree"
- 23 March 1954 - "The Tenth Reunion"
- 30 March 1954 - "Torment"
- 6 April 1954 - "Open Transom"
- 13 April 1954 - "Operation: Barracuda"
- 20 April 1954 - "The Return Journey"
- 27 April 1954 - "The Terror Begins"
- 4 May 1954 - "Smoke"
- 11 May 1954 - "Operation Nightmare"
- 18 May 1954 - "Breakout"
- 25 May 1954 - "Fingerprints"
- 1 June 1954 - "Race Against Murder"
- 8 June 1954 - "North Side"
- 15 June 1954 - "The Pistol Shot"
- 22 June 1954 - "String"
- 29 June 1954 - "The Hunted"
- 6 July 1954 - "The Girl in Car Thirty-two"
- 13 July 1954 - "Conversation at an Inn"
- 20 July 1954 - "Once a Killer"
- 27 July 1954 - "Main Feature: Death"
- 3 August 1954 - "The Last Stand"
- 10 August 1954 - "The Iron Cop"
- 17 August 1954 - "Barn Burning"

== 1964 version ==
A new filmed version of the show premiered on CBS in March 1964. This version, hosted by Sebastian Cabot, ran until September 9, 1964. However the episodes broadcast from July until the end were simply reruns from the Schlitz Playhouse of the Stars.
