= Charles Francis Lott =

American physician (1781–1866)

Dr. Charles Francis Lott

Charles Francis Lott (1781 – July 8, 1866) was a New Jersey medical doctor and surgeon. He served in the War of 1812, for which he raised a company of light horse cavalry and became a medical director and assistant adjutant general.

== Life and career ==
Born in Princeton, New Jersey, Lott was the only child of Peter and Mary (Heyer) Lott. His father served in the Continental Army during the American Revolutionary War, and Lott "remembered the battle of Princeton as well as that of Trenton" from his childhood. He studied medicine with Dr. Moses Scott, and graduated in Philadelphia in 1805 and settled in New Mills, New Jersey (later Pemberton) in 1806 or 1807. Overall, he practiced medicine there for thirty years.

When the War of 1812 began, Lott raised a company of "light horse" and "while he would not accept the captaincy, he served as lieutenant of the company of patriots". During the war, he was an assistant surgeon, with the rank of captain in the regiment of Major Samuel Joseph Read. Over the course of his service, he became medical director and assistant adjutant general, and "occupied a military station near the mouth of the Delaware river, at Red Bank, where he also held the position of divisional medical director".

Returning to New Jersey, "his practice was quite extensive", and included the furnaces in Speedwell, Hanover and Batsto, and to the County almshouse. During this time, Lott "also he became a director in the Farmers' and Mechanics' bank, located at Mount Holly". He was listed as a county commissioner of Burlington County, New Jersey, in 1818, and again in 1822. In 1819, Lott was a charter member of St. John's Commandery No. 4, Knights Templar. Lott retired from the practice of medicine in New Jersey in 1835, and lived in Trenton until the spring of 1836, when Lott and his family moved to Quincy, Illinois. In 1837 he went to St. Louis, Missouri, where he practiced medicine and "engaged in the whole sale drug business for several years". He returned to the East, residing for a time in Philadelphia before moving to Bethlehem, Pennsylvania, and finally moving in 1849 to Quakertown, Pennsylvania, where he remained until his death.

== Personal life and death ==
On November 5, 1809, Lott married Edith N. Lamb, a daughter of Colonel Jacob Lamb, with whom Lott had six sons and two daughters. One of his sons, Charles Fayette Lott, born July 1, 1824, became a state legislator and judge in Butte County, California. When Charles Fayette sought to travel to California, Lott opposed it and cut off funds to the son, who then mortgaged property to be able to make the journey. Lott's youngest son, Bushrod W. Lott, born May 1, 1826, went on to become a political figure in Minnesota, and the first mayor of Saint Paul, Minnesota.

Edith died in October 1827. In July 1848, while living in Philadelphia, Lott married a second time to Eliza Bewley, widow of Nathan Bewley. From this marriage, a daughter, Annie, was born. Lott died of paralysis at the age of in the 85, and was buried in the Moravian Cemetery at Bethlehem, Pennsylvania. Eliza Lott, having then been twice widowed, survived Lott by 32 years, dying in Quakertown in 1898, at the age of 89.
