= Ghulam Mohammad Lot =

Pakistani politician (c.1929–2019)

Provincial Assembly of Sindh
- In office 18 October 1993 – 7 November 1996
- Constituency: PS-57 (Badin-III)

Personal details
- Born: c. 1929
- Died: 25 October 2019 (aged 90)
- Party: Pakistan Peoples Party
- Relatives: Gul Muhammad Lot (son)

Ghulam Mohammad Lot (c.1929–2019) was a Pakistani politician belonging to the Pakistan Peoples Party. He was a member of the Provincial Assembly of Sindh. His son Gul Muhammad Lot was a senator.

== Biography ==
Lot was elected as a member of the Provincial Assembly of Sindh from PS-57 (Badin-III) in 1993.

Lot died of cardiac arrest on 25 October 2019 at the age of 90.
