= Oscar Hallam =

American judge

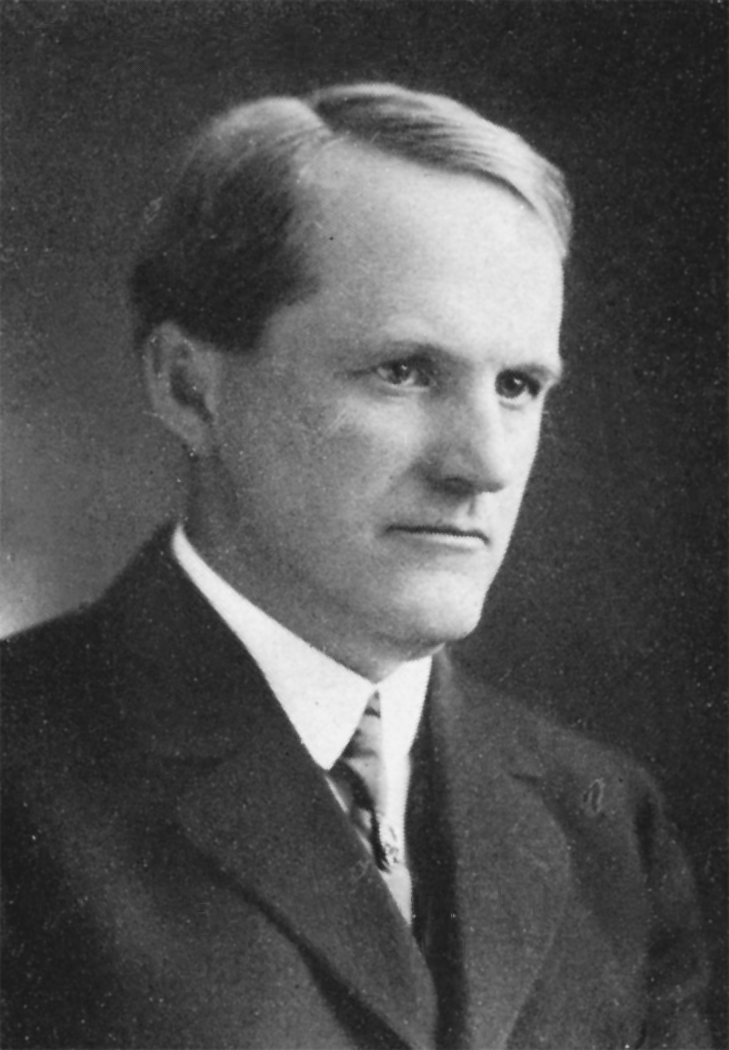
Oscar Hallam

Oscar Hallam (October 19, 1865 – September 23, 1945) was an American lawyer, judge, and academic from Minnesota. He served as a justice of the Minnesota Supreme Court from 1912 to 1924, and served as a Minnesota state Second District Court judge from 1905 to 1912. Hallam was a member of the faculty (1901–1945), dean (1919–1941) and president until 1945, of William Mitchell College of Law.

In 1924, Hallam was a candidate in the Minnesota state primary election for the office of United States Senator. He was also Chairman of the Section on Criminal Law of the American Bar Association. In 1926, he served as Chairman of the Minnesota Crime Commission and originated the Minnesota State Department of Criminal Apprehension and established the full-time Minnesota Board of Parole. He also served as President of the Ramsey County Bar Association, was chairman of the Board of Governors of the Twin City Unit of the Shriners Hospital for Children, and Chairman of the 4-Minute Men of Minnesota during World War I.

Born on a farm, in the town of Linden, Iowa County, Wisconsin, Hallam received his Bachelor of Arts in 1887 and Bachelor of Laws in 1887 from the University of Wisconsin.

In 1892, Hallam married Edith Lamb Lott (1870 – 17 July 1942) in St. Paul; their daughter, Mrs. Corneila Hallam Miller (16 April 1893 – 20 February 1975) served as President of the St. Paul Women City Club and writer for the St. Paul Pioneer Press. In 1933, Hallam sent his grandson, Stanley F. Miller, Jr. (3 October 1916 – 21 September 1991) to represent Minnesota in the Boy Scouts of America contingent to the World Jamboree in Gödöllő, Hungary.

Image: Oscar Hallam Minnesota Historical Society Photograph Collection ca. 1932 |

Image: Edith Lott Hallam (Mrs. Oscar Hallam) Minnesota Historical Society Photograph Collection ca. 1930

Memorial from volume 220 of Minnesota Reports for Associate Justice Oscar Hallam...p. 1 of 4

A few years before his death in 1946, Judge Oscar Hallam of St. Paul wrote a series of stories about his youth on a Midwest farm of the 1870s and assembled them in a manuscript volume which he called "Bloomfield and Number Five". The original manuscript, "Bloomfield and Number Five" [by] Oscar Hallam was presented to the Minnesota Historical Society by the author's daughter, Mrs. Cornelia Hallam Miller of St. Paul in 1946
