= Blind Date (American game show) =

- Also known as: Your Big Moment
- Created by: Bernard Schubert
- Presented by: Arlene Francis; Melvyn Douglas; Jan Murray
- Announcer: Walter Herlihy; Rex Marshall
- Country of origin: United States

Production
- Running time: 25 minutes

Original release
- Network: ABC (1949–1951); NBC (1952); DuMont (1953)
- Release: May 5, 1949 – September 15, 1953

Blind Date (also known as Your Big Moment) is an American television game show which aired on ABC, NBC, and then DuMont after many years on radio.

== Radio version ==
In this version, the six men (initially local servicemen) sat on one side of a wall, and the three women sat on the other side. Two men each would have about two minutes to explain by telephone their best points to one woman. After they both had their turn, the woman chose the date she found more interesting, with the winners escorted through swinging doors to meet their blind dates.

== Television version ==
=== Format #1 ===
Six men vied for dates with three unseen women by having conversations with them, in a show similar to the future The Dating Game. The men, who were typically either servicemen or college students, were known as the "Hunters" and tried to win a date with the women, known as the "Hunted," for an expense-paid date on the town, which included an invitation to a popular local nightclub.

Winners received a night on the town, which on the premiere episode included a nightclub invitation to the Stork Club, $5 in pocket money, and a chaperoned ride home. The losers received a friendly kiss from Francis, $15 in cash, and tickets to a popular local theater production as consolation prizes. And the women were each paid $50 for their appearances.

In this version, two men (college students or servicemen) were seated on one side of a wall and telephoned one of the women sitting on the other side. They attempted to talk her into accepting a date with one of them. On the basis of voice and specially prepared questions, she chose the most impressive one of the two for her affections. Those two people became a couple. This process continued until three couples were formed.

At the end of the show, the audience determined which couple would receive the romantic night on the town by means of applause.

=== Format #2 ===
In 1953, the television format was changed to viewers writing to the show, and asking about a date with a type of person, or to go on a date to a special event.

== Broadcast history ==
Blind Date started on the stage of the Hollywood Theatre in Sioux Falls, South Dakota, as G.I. Blind Date, a radio show designed to entertain servicemen at the Army Radio Technical Training School in town. The first show was broadcast on KELO radio in January 1943. G.I. Blind Date was created by Joe Floyd, Cliff Gill and Vera Thomson as a between-movie entertainment feature. Seeing its success, Floyd peddled the idea around to other markets, eventually selling it to NBC radio where it first aired July 8, 1943, hosted by Arlene Francis.

The radio show grew into a television show. This version originally aired on ABC from May 5, 1949, to September 20, 1951, moved to NBC from June 7 to July 15, 1952, then ran on DuMont (originally as Your Big Moment) from May 19 to September 15, 1953. The ABC version aired Fridays at 8:30pm EST during the start of the 1949–50 TV season, and Thursdays at 9:30pm EST during the 1950–51 season.

Arlene Francis was the host of the ABC and NBC versions, and had hosted the radio version since 1943. Melvyn Douglas became host when the show moved to DuMont, but was replaced after the third show by Jan Murray.

== Episode status ==
One episode with Francis from 1950 is held among collectors, while the August 25, 1953, show with Murray is held by the Paley Center for Media.

== Critical reception ==
Media critic Jack Gould wrote in The New York Times, "Blind Date does not seem very real." He explained that the show had a "forced and contrived nature", with the participants appearing to have been rehearsed.

== See also ==
- List of programs broadcast by the DuMont Television Network
- List of surviving DuMont Television Network broadcasts

== Bibliography ==
- David Weinstein, The Forgotten Network: DuMont and the Birth of American Television (Philadelphia: Temple University Press, 2004) ISBN 1-59213-245-6
- Alex McNeil, Total Television, Fourth edition (New York: Penguin Books, 1996) ISBN 0-14-024916-8
- Brooks, Tim; Marsh, Earle F. (2009). The Complete Directory to Prime Time Network and Cable TV Shows 1946–Present. Random House Publishing Group. p. 154. ISBN 9780307483201.
