= Morris Mansion and Mill =

Historic house in New Jersey, United States

- U.S. National Register of Historic Places
- New Jersey Register of Historic Places
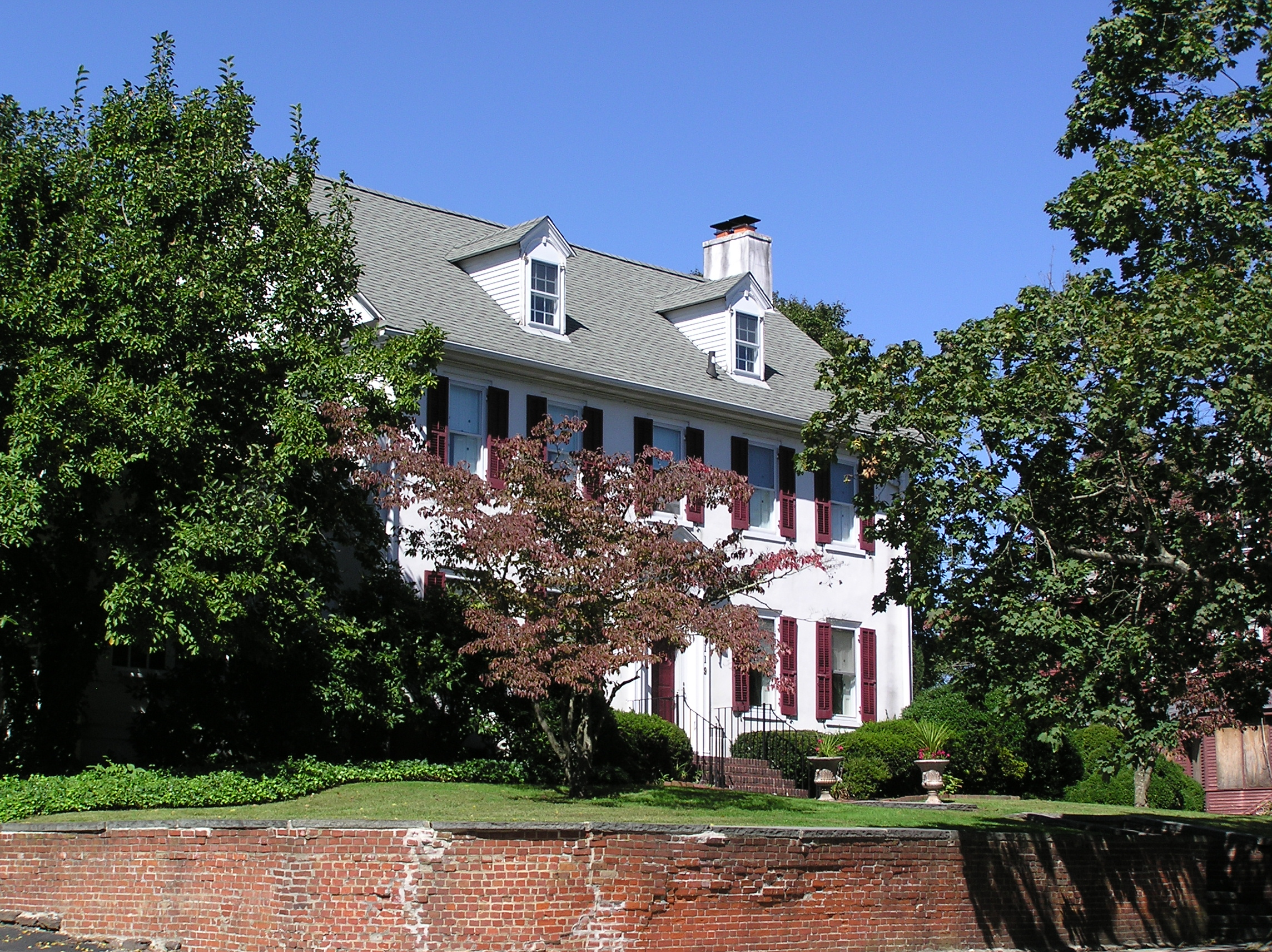

- Location within Burlington County, New Jersey Location within New Jersey Location within the United States
- Location: Hanover Street, Pemberton, New Jersey
- Coordinates: 39°58′15″N 74°41′4″W
- Area: 1 acre (0.40 ha)
- Architectural style: Greek Revival, Federal
- NRHP reference No.: 77000855
- NJRHP No.: 856

Significant dates
- Added to NRHP: September 13, 1977
- Designated NJRHP: November 26, 1973

The Morris Mansion and Mill is located in Pemberton, Burlington County, New Jersey, United States. The building was added to the National Register of Historic Places on September 13, 1977.

== See also ==
- National Register of Historic Places listings in Burlington County, New Jersey
