= Filipino Cultural Association =

Student association at the University of Maryland, College Park

The Filipino Cultural Association (FCA) is one of the first Filipino American collegiate/student associations to be formed in the Metro Washington, DC area. It is the resident Fil-Am student group at The University of Maryland, College Park.

== History ==
The student network organization was originally designed to increase awareness of Filipino culture, as well as strengthen the unity among its members through cultural, academic, athletic, and social programs. Formed in 1978-79 under the leadership of Lito Sison, several Filipino students sought to unite other Filipinos in the University of Maryland, much in the same way that other Fil-Am student groups started in colleges/universities on the West Coast United States, and elsewhere. Originally called "Samahang Pilipino," the organization adopted the name "Filipino Cultural Association (FCA)" in 1981. It then reached its arms out to welcome friends of other nationalities interested in discovering the beauty and excitement of the Filipino culture and history.

== Filipino American Studies ==
The Filipino American Studies Program (FAST) began as a direct result of a request from the newly appointed Director of Asian American Studies, Larry Hajime Shinagawa. During the Fall of 2006, he asked Jonathan Sterlin and the executive board of the Filipino Cultural Association, who played a substantial role in the establishment of the University of Maryland's Asian American Studies Department, to lead this endeavor with the following three goals in mind:

1. To enhance the diversity of the University's course offerings by educating the campus community about the role Filipino Americans have played throughout the history of the United States and examining the culture, societal contributions, and contemporary experiences of Filipino Americans;
2. To partner with the Asian American Studies Department and representatives from the greater Filipino American community to develop the curriculum; and
3. To serve as a model for other ethnic groups to follow in the future development of diversity offerings at this University as well as other post-secondary institutions throughout the country.

The Filipino American Studies Program is integrally linked to the Asian American Studies Department at the University of Maryland, College Park whose mission is to provide students with the opportunity to study the experiences of Asian Americans critically.

== Philippine Culture Night (PCN) ==
FCA has a 42-year-old history of hosting its annual PCN – Philippine Culture Night – every Spring semester. The organization showcased their 42nd annual show on Saturday, April 12, 2025 at 5PM in the Stamp Student Union Grand Ballroom. The event started out as a simple showcase of Filipino culture; highlighting cultural and modern dancing, singing, and comedy skits. Often, the organization would bring in local talent (singers/singing groups, folk dance troupes, martial artists, etc.) to perform, but as the years progressed, FCA began to pull resources from within their growing membership – many of whom had participated in their local community Fil-Am organizational dance troupes and schools. During the 1994-1995 PCN, the show took on a form that was modeled after the PCN of UC Berkeley after then president, Paolo Macabenta, got the idea from one of his home visits to San Francisco. The show incorporated cultural (ethnic and pop-cultural) dances and songs into a full-length production in the form of a play. Often the topics of its plays depict the true-to-life experiences of Fil-Am youth, and how they clash-but-learn with the culture of their parents.

== Campus Activities ==
Aside from the yearly PCN, FCA participates in a number of events including the student fairs sponsored by the university, Cultural Explosion, many of the events sponsored by the Asian American Student Union, as well as inter-organizational events with other student groups. An example would be the annual FACES Fashion Extravaganza/Party. FACES started in 1995 as a social event between FCA and the Chinese Culture Club (CCC). The organization auditioned students to model fashions from local designers and/or retail stores. The event would end with a party for its audience and the participants themselves. For the second annual event, the Korean Student Association (KSA) joined both FCA and CCC as the third-sponsoring student organization for the event. FACES was named after a nightclub of the same name in Manila, Philippines. FACES continues to strive for excellence and takes pride in showcasing local talent to the community abroad.

== Involvement with FIND/D6 ==
FCA is also a founding-member organization of the Filipino Intercollegiate Networking Dialogue's sixth district. More popularly known as "D6," the group comprises Fil-Am student groups from University of Maryland, College Park, University of Maryland, Baltimore County, Towson University, Johns Hopkins University, and George Mason University. D6 encompasses the Mid-Atlantic Region of FIND, and is the sixth of eight districts that span from Maine down to Florida. In addition to FIND, D6 schools participate in sports such as George Mason University's Turkeybowl and D6 Basketball, where they all have a chance to compete with each other. They also have picnics where they can meet other members of the other Filipino clubs in the district.

== Executive Board ==
2025-2026 Executive Board
Position	Name
President	Troy Rementina
Vice President	Izzy Vallar
Treasurer	Matthew Reyes
Treasurer	Devyn Nguyen
Cultural Chair	Nathan Castelo
Cultural Chair	Hermione Tabeta
Secretary	Aaron Atayan
Director of Public Relations	Gabriel Pasahol-Copeland
Director of Public Relations	Bea Montances
Community Service Chair	Michaela Raqueno
FIND-D6 Representative	Gabby Garcia
FIND-D6 Representative	Timothy Calahatian
Sports Coordinator	Aenon Denaque
Sports Coordinator	Olivia Vallar
Design and Publication Editor	Jahniya Isabel Braga
Historian	Katelyn Bowman
Historian	Isaiah Dalisay
Webmaster	Sebastian Busog
Freshman Representative	Katelyn Hipolito
Freshman Representative	Toni Tan

== Past Presidents ==
Past FCA Presidents
School Year	Name(s)
2025-2026	Psalmy Lacson
2024-2025	Eman Bautista
2023-2024	Brandon Price
2022-2023	Andrea Cagurangan
2021-2022	Enzo Regala
2020-2021	Dominic Escobal
2019-2020	Noemi Arquero
2018-2019	Pamela Tarectecan
2017-2018	Eric Flores
2016-2017	Alexis Flores
2015-2016	Joel Vazquez
2014-2015	Jonathan Reyes
2013-2014	Krystle Canare
2012-2013	Andrew Aggabao
Spring 2012	Jitter Garcia
Fall 2011	Nicole Calaro
2010-2011	Jeanine Reyes
2009-2010	Jose Alejandro N Almario
2008-2009	Steve Encomienda
2007-2008	Maricel Hernandez
2006-2007	Jonathan Sterlin
2005-2006	Ryan Herrera
2004-2005	Bianca Viray
2003-2004	Catherine Cervantes
2002-2003	Brandon Feráren
2001-2002	Greg de Guzman
2000-2001	Cezar Lopez
1999-2000	Angela Ly
1998-1999	Marnie Mataac
1997-1998	Wendel Ladringan (Julie Chua, Co-President Fall 1997)
1996-1997	Pete Murray
1995-1996	Noel Barrion
1994-1995	Paolo Macabenta
1993-1994	Maria Elena (Bow) Salientes
1992-1993	Cesar Padua Cube
