= Steve Lott (politician) =

American politician (born 1966)

Member of the Mississippi House of Representatives from the 107th district
- Incumbent
- Assumed office January 2, 2024
- Preceded by: Doug McLeod

Personal details
- Born: April 4, 1966 (age 60) Tylertown, Mississippi
- Party: Republican
- Spouse: Sandy Lott
- Education: University of Southern Mississippi (BS, MS)
- Occupation: Politician
- Profession: Manufacturing

Steve Lott (born 1966) is an American politician, He serves as a member of the Mississippi House of Representatives for the 107th District, affiliating with the Republican Party, a position he has held since 2024.
