= Murder of Nadine Lott =

2019 murder in Ireland

Nadine Lott
- Died: 17 December 2019
- Cause of death: Hypoxic ischaemic encephalopathy due to traumatic head, neck, and chest injuries
- Resting place: St Gabriel's Cemetery, Arklow, County Wicklow, Ireland
- Known for: Murder victim
- Parent: Claire Lott

Nadine Lott was an Irishwoman who was murdered by her ex-partner, Daniel Murtagh, in December 2019. On 14 December, Lott, who was 30 years old at the time, was subjected to a "sustained and violent attack", in which Murtagh, a trained boxer, caused severe blunt force trauma with his bare hands, as well as stabbing Lott repeatedly.

On 17 December, Lott died as a result of the injuries she sustained in the assault. Her injuries were so severe that she never regained consciousness before her death, and had received 42 pints of blood in her first 24 hours in hospital.

== Background ==
In June 2012, Lott had travelled to Darwin in Australia, where she worked in a beauty salon. It was here that she had what prosecution counsel John O’Kelly called the "dreadful misfortune" of meeting Daniel Murtagh. They first initiated a relationship there but did not last. Lott returned to Ireland in mid-2013, and Murtagh followed shortly afterward. Around this time, she gave birth to her only child, a daughter whom she named Kya. Lott and Murtagh reportedly had an on-again, off-again relationship for several years. In August 2016, Lott and Murtagh planned to move into a house together in Arklow, County Wicklow. When Murtagh did not arrive on the day they were to move into the house, Lott ended the relationship for the final time. After the murder, Murtagh claimed that he and Nadine had been seeing each other again in secret for a few weeks before the murder. This statement was refuted by Superintendent Declan McCarthy, who headed the murder investigation. McCarthy said that Murtagh was “clearly deluded about the status of his relationship with Nadine” and that the two had been “separated for quite a long time” before Murtagh's attack. On the date of the assault, Murtagh lived with his parents in Clondalkin, County Dublin, and Lott lived in her apartment in Wicklow.

Murtagh had trained in boxing for a number of years before the assault. During the trial, jurors were shown a number of WhatsApp messages exchanged between Lott and Murtagh. On 5 December, Lott sent Murtagh a message that read "Nothing is ever going to happen between us again, I want to make that clear." In reply to messages Murtagh sent her about whether she had had another man in her apartment, Lott sent him message saying "Don't threaten me either." On 9 December, Lott had sent Murtagh a message telling him that she was planning to go for drinks to celebrate her aunt's birthday on the 13 December. On 14 December, a few hours before the attack, Murtagh messaged Lott asking her to "Please come home soon". He tried to call her at 12.57 a.m. and 1.26 a.m. but could not get through to her.

== Attack on Lott ==
On 14 December 2019, Murtagh subjected Lott to a serious and sustained assault. During the attack, Murtagh beat Lott with his hands, kicked her, stabbed her, and beat her with a charger for a tyre-pump. She lost consciousness and was admitted to hospital. Between 3:30 a.m. and 4.00 a.m., Lott's neighbour, Amela Kulenovic, heard banging and noises. At first, she thought it was early festive celebrations, but later realised she could hear someone crying. Kulenovic went to investigate and entered Lott's apartment after finding the door open and the hall light on. She found Lott lying face down on the ground, with Murtagh crouched on top of her in the midst of the assault. Kulenovic described Murtagh as being like a "wild animal" that was "vicious with rage", and although she exclaimed "Oh my God, what the fuck is going on?", Murtagh did not appear to register that she was even there. Kulenovic described Lott as only being capable of making a weeping or gurgling noise. Kulenovic retreated to her own apartment, where she alerted Lott's family.

Upon arriving at the scene, Nadine's sister Phoebe noticed the broken glass around the apartment. Garda Linda Butler, along with Garda Ben Silverlock, arrived shortly after Nadine's family, and noted the "really intense smell of blood" on their way in the door. Butler noted that a large pool of blood had formed around Lott's head, which she described as being "grotesque and swollen". Butler, along with Lott's mother Claire tried to resuscitate her. While trying to clear Lott's airways, Butler discovered that she was missing several teeth. Claire Lott described the effort as futile as Nadine was unable to stop "gurgling". Ian Clarke, one of four paramedics who attempted to save Lott, said that broken furniture was scattered everywhere. Due to the sheer amount of blood and debris, Clarke said that it "was difficult so see where all of the injuries were".

A paramedic who attended the scene described it as one of the most “horrendous scenes” he had ever witnessed. Murtagh had inflicted "extreme and grotesque" facial injuries, which separated Lott's flesh from her skull. Lott's injuries were so severe that Claire Lott, Nadine's mother, who found Nadine, was unable to recognise her daughter. An intensive care nurse echoed both the paramedic and Claire, in describing Lott's injuries as the worst she had ever seen, saying that Lott was “completely unrecognizable”. Garda Butler, who had attended the scene, described Lott as having been "beaten to a pulp". A senior Garda was quoted as saying that he never had seen "such a level of violence" inflicted on an individual.

Upon arrival at St Vincent's Hospital in Dublin, it was noted that Lott had fragments of wood and a dinner plate matted into her bloodied hair. Nurses were unable to wash her hair, for fear of worsening the bleeding. In her first 24 hours in hospital, Lott received 42 pints of blood.

Driving away from the scene later that morning, Murtagh crashed the car he was driving into a ditch. Murtagh was found staggering a short distance away by a passerby who called him an ambulance. Murtagh told the passerby that he had "killed [his] wife", and later told the paramedic that he had killed his girlfriend. He was brought to Tallaght Hospital, where he was arrested.

On 17 December 2019, three days after she first entered hospital, Lott succumbed to her injuries and died.

== Trial ==
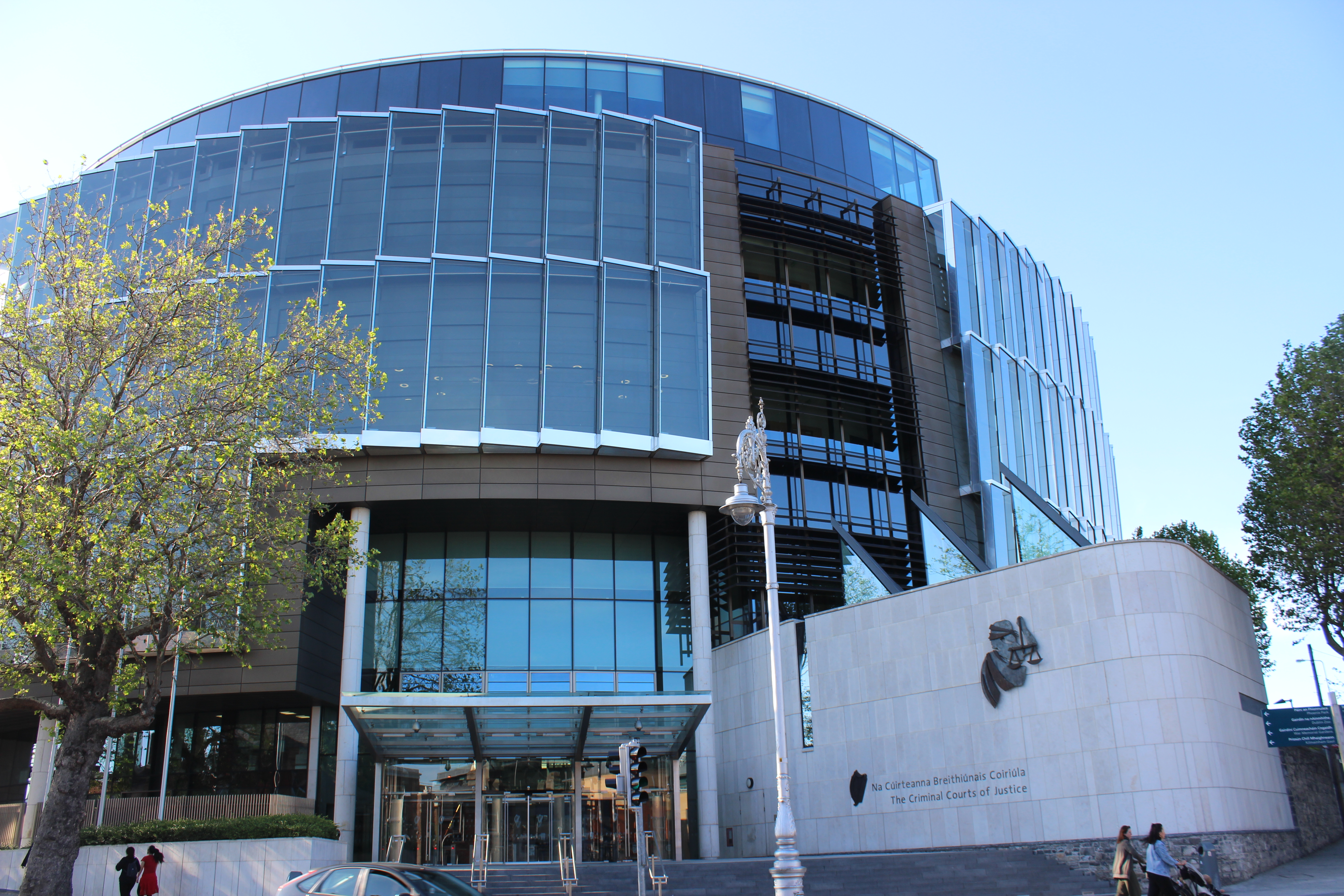
The Criminal Courts of Justice, Dublin, which hosts the Central Criminal Court.

On 16 December, Murtagh appeared before Bray District Court and was charged with serious assault of Lott. He was remanded in custody to appear before Cloverhill court.

On 17 December, Lott died due to the injuries she sustained during the assault, and as a result, on 14 January, at Cloverhill District Court, Murtagh was charged with the murder of Lott. Murtagh pleaded guilty to manslaughter but not guilty to murder, claiming to have been too intoxicated to formulate intent. According to Murtagh, he had smoked a joint, taken two pills, and drank 350ml of straight rum.

During the trial, Dr. Linda Mulligan, the Chief State Pathologist, told the court that Lott had suffered blunt force injuries caused by hands, fists, or feet, and that use of a weapon could not be ruled out. She explained that 64 individual injuries had been observed on Lott's body, but these could not be accounted for by medical intervention. The post-mortem revealed that alongside the blunt-force trauma, sharp-force trauma, and stab wound Lott suffered, she experienced multiple cardiac arrests and sustained traumatic brain injury.

On 5 August 2021, a jury at the Central Criminal Court found Murtagh guilty of the murder of Lott, unanimously rejecting his defence after almost six hours of deliberations over two days. On 4 October 2021, he received the mandatory sentence of life imprisonment. Claire Lott delivered a victim impact statement in which she said Lott's family are "haunted by Nadine's terror, fear, panic, cries on that night during the prolonged evil attack", and that the "family now sees traumatic counselling replace hobbies, night terrors and sleepless nights replace sleep, life replaced with existence." It was revealed in his sentencing hearing that Murtagh has nine previous convictions, including one from 2011 for "threatening and abusive behaviour".

== Aftermath ==
=== Memorial ===
A funeral service was held for Lott on 22 December at Sts Mary and Peter's Church in Arklow. The church was attended by almost 1,000 people, and hundreds more waited outside the church. She was buried in St Gabriel's Cemetery.

=== Legacy ===
==== Political response ====
Lott's murder, along with that of Anne Colomines and Natalia Karaczyn, prompted commentary on the issue of women being killed by their romantic partners in Ireland. The killing has been described as having had a similar effect on the Irish public's view on femicide as the murder of Sarah Everard did in the UK and the killing of Gabby Petito did in the U.S. It has since been compared to the murder of Ashling Murphy, and that of Ana Kriégel. Louise O'Neill, author of Asking for It, said in 2022 that events such as the murder of Nadine Lott made it clear that Ireland was not "a country for women".
