= Derek Lott =

British entomologist and museum curator (1953–2011)

- Born: 28 September 1953
- Died: 19 June 2011 (aged 57)
- Education: Balliol College Oxford, University of Warwick
- Known for: Coleoptera studies, biodiversity recording
- Scientific career
- Fields: Entomology
- Workplaces: Leicester Museums

Dr Derek Arthur Lott F.E.S. was a British entomologist and museum curator, known for his studies of Coleoptera and biodiversity recording.

Lott was born on 28 September 1953 in Middlesex, England. He was educated at Hampton Grammar School and went on to study chemistry at Balliol College, Oxford. After attaining a P.G.C.E. from Warwick University in 1977 Lott originally worked as a science teacher, then in 1983 applied for a place on the graduate trainee scheme for Leicester Museums. Lott first worked as an assistant Keeper of Entomology at Leicester Museum, rising through promotions to become the Curator of Natural Life in 1999. Lott later ran an entomology-focused consultancy company.

Lott's special interest areas in Coleoptera studies were Carabidae (ground beetles), Staphylinidae (rove beetles), water beetles, environmental monitoring and regional recording of species, especially from the U.K. and Ireland. Lott became a fellow of the Royal Entomological Society in the 1980s, as well as a member of the Amateur Entomologists Society and the British Entomological & Natural History Society.

Lott had a personal dataset of 61,366 records, comprising a lifetime of beetle occurrence observations, which he shared with the National Biodiversity Network in 2010. The National Biodiversity Network recognised Lott with an honorary fellowship for his dedication to biological recording and the high standards of his work. During his career Lott wrote or contributed to at least 84 natural history papers, a bibliography of which is recorded in Durden (2011).

== Select publications ==
- Lott, D.: Beetle recording in Leicestershire, Coleoptera Recording Scheme Newsletter, number 1 (February 1984)
- Lott, D.A.: Notes on Aromia moschata (L.) (Col., Cerambycidae) in Leicestershire. Entomologist's Monthly Magazine 123: p. 222 (1987)
- Durden, L.A.; Lott, D.A. & Ingram, B.: Fleas (Siphonaptera) from a dormouse nest in Devon. Entomologist's Monthly Magazine 124: p. 156. (1988)
- Foster, G.N. & Lott, D.A.: Modern Records of Upland Aquatic Coleoptera (Dytiscidae) in Ireland, The Irish Naturalists' Journal, volume 23, number 2, pp. 72–73 (April 1989)
- Lott, D. A.: The role of local museums in taxonomic support, British journal of entomology and natural history, volume 7, pp. 58–60 (1994)
- Eyre, Michael D.; Lott, Derek A. & Garside, Adam: Assessing the potential for environmental monitoring using ground beetles (Coleoptera: Carabidae) with riverside and Scottish data, Annales Zoologici Fennici, volume 33, number 1, pp. 157–163 (1996)
- Eyre, M.D.; Lott, D.A. & Luff, M.L.: The rove beetles (Coleoptera, Staphylinidae) of exposed riverine sediments in Scotland and northern England: Habitat classification and conservation aspects, Journal of Insect Conservation, volume 5, pp. 173–186 (2001)
- Lott, D.A.: A review of Staphylinidae doubtfully recorded from the British Isles. Coleopterist 11: pp. 33–38 (2002)
- Lott, D.A.: Riparian beetles from four river catchments in Northumberland and Durham. Coleopterist 15: pp. 35–42 (2006)
- Lott, Derek: The Leicestershire Coleopterists: 200 Years of Beetle Hunting (Loughborough Naturalists' Club) (2009)
