= Joseph B. Lott =

American politician in Louisiana (fl.1873)

Joseph B. Lott was an American state legislator in Louisiana. He served in the Louisiana House of Representatives. Harry Lott also represented the Parish.

Lott gave testimony in 1873 that the registrar of Rapides Parish refused to register African American voters.

Lott may have moved to Texas.
