= Bushrod W. Lott =

American Minnesota Territory politician (1826–1886)

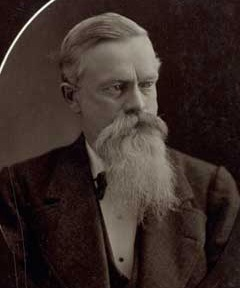

Mayor of Saint Paul

Personal details
- Born: May 1, 1826 Pemberton, New Jersey
- Died: September 24, 1886 (aged 60) Saint Paul, Minnesota
- Party: Democratic
- Occupation: Politician

Bushrod Washington Lott (May 1, 1826 – September 24, 1886) was an American politician in the Minnesota Territory in Saint Paul, Minnesota, who served as United States Consul (Tehuantepec, Mexico; Appointed by President Abraham Lincoln) from 1862 to 1865. An active Democrat, Lott was elected Chief Clerk of the Minnesota Territorial House of Representatives and served as a member of that body in 1853 and 1856; he also was elected mayor of Saint Paul, Minnesota in 1852.

== Early life ==
Bushrod W. Lott was born May 1, 1826, in Pemberton, New Jersey, to Dr. Charles Francis Lott (1781–1866) (a surgeon in the War of 1812) and Edith Newbold Lamb Lott (1788–1827). Bushrod W. Lott's family moved to St. Louis, Missouri in 1837. Lott and two of his brothers were educated at St. Louis University and studied law in Quincy, Illinois.

== Political career ==
Bushrod W. Lott was admitted to the practice of law in 1847. His brother, Peter Lott, served in the Mexican War, served as Judge of Courts in Quincy, Illinois, and was appointed by his personal friend, President Abraham Lincoln as United States Consul to Tehuantepec, Mexico, where Peter Lott died. His brother, Charles F. Lott traveled over the California Trail as California Gold Rush pioneer, lawyer, and judge who helped form California's government, started the first Citrus Exchange in California, and served as a California State Senator).

As one of the early pioneers of Saint Paul, Minnesota, in 1848, Bushrod W. Lott, accompanied Gen. Samuel Leech, who had been appointed Receiver of United States Land Office, St. Croix Falls, Wisconsin, where Bushrod W. Lott served as Clerk. In the fall of 1848, Lott settled in Saint Paul, Minnesota where he practiced law (his real estate holdings were valued at $3,000 in 1850); he was elected Justice of the Peace (Saint Paul, Minnesota) in 1851; and served as the third mayor of Saint Paul, Minn. from 1852 to 1854. In 1862, Bushrod Lott was appointed by President Lincoln to serve out his brother Peter Lott's term as U.S. Consul to Tehuantepec, Mexico, a post he held until 1865.

== Family life ==
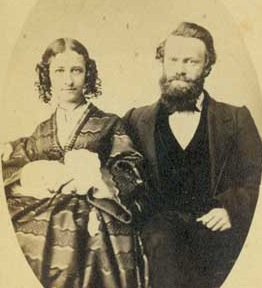
Bushrod Lott and Cornelia Friend Lott, c. 1860.

On February 14, 1860, Bushrod W. Lott married Corneila Friend, of Pittsburgh, Pennsylvania, with whom he had a son, Kennedy F. Lott (1866–1953) of Saint Paul, Minnesota; and a daughter, Edith Lamb Lott (1870 – 17 July 1942). Edith married Judge Oscar Hallam, a justice of the Minnesota Supreme Court, on July 27, 1892, in Saint Paul, Minnesota; through them Lott had a granddaughter, Corneila Hallam Miller (16 April 1893 – 20 February 1975) in Saint Paul, Minnesota.

== Death ==
Bushrod W. Lott died on September 24, 1886, in Saint Paul, Minnesota.

== See also ==
- List of mayors of Saint Paul, Minnesota

== References and sources ==
- Photo: Bushrod Washington Lott (ca. 1878) Minnesota Legislative Reference Library
- Minnesota Legislators Past & Present -Legislator Record - Lott, Bushrod Washington "B.W."
- Chief Clerks of the Minnesota House of Representatives, 1849-present
- The Minnesota law journal, Volume 5 By Minnesota State Bar Association
- The Lott Family in America by A.V. Phillips (1942)
