= Edson Schuyler Lott II =

American football player (1905–1992)

Profile
- Position: Tackle

Personal information
- Born: January 17, 1905; New York, New York, U.S.
- Died: June 28, 1992 (aged 87); Haverford, Pennsylvania, U.S.

Career information
- High school: Lawrenceville School (NJ)
- College: Columbia

Career history
- Orange Tornadoes (1929); Brooklyn Dodgers (1930)
- Stats at Pro Football Reference

Edson Schuyler Lott II (January 17, 1905 – June 28, 1992), referred to in one source as John Lott, was an American football player and officer in the U.S. Coast Guard.

Lott was born in 1905 in New York City. He was the grandson of Edson S. Lott, president of the United States Casualty Company. Lott attended the Horace Mann School, the New York Military Academy, and the Lawrenceville School. While at Lawrenceville, he played right tackle on the school football team, was captain of the track team, and won the school's heavyweight boxing championship. He broke a school record by appearing in every quarter of every football game for four consecutive years. He also played for the Columbia University junior varsity football team.

Lott also played at the tackle position in the National Football League (NFL) for the Orange Tornadoes in 1929 and for the Brooklyn Dodgers in 1930. He appeared in four NFL games.

Lott worked professionally as an agent for the United States Casualty Company. He was married to Broadway dancing star Clair Cole, but they were divorced in 1933. He married for a second time to Gloria Edgerton Heublein in December 1934.

Lott also attained the rank of lieutenant commander in the U.S. Coast Guard. He died in 1992 at age 87.
