= Charles Fayette Lott =

American politician and judge in California (1824–1918)

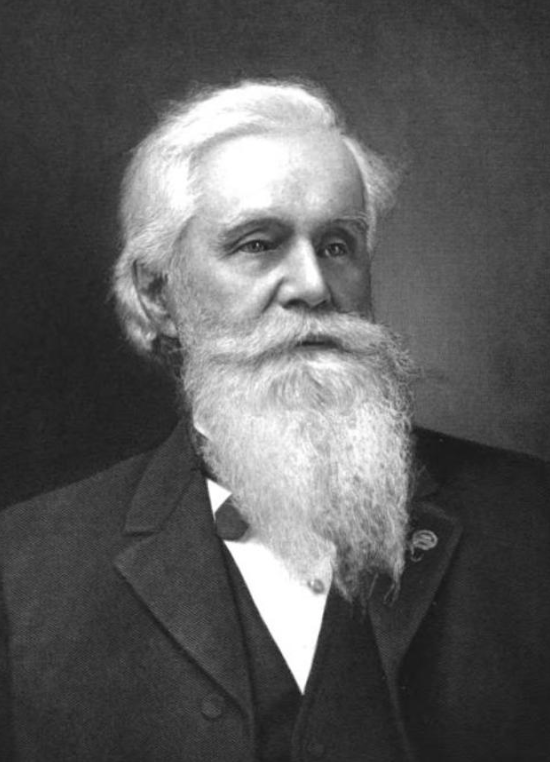
Judge Charles F. Lott

Charles Fayette Lott (July 1, 1824 – September 4, 1918) was an American judge who served one term in the California State Senate.

== Early life, education, and career ==
Born in Pemberton, New Jersey, Lott was the son of physician and War of 1812 hero Charles Francis Lott. He attended school at Pemberton as a child, and then he removed with the rest of the family to Trenton. There they settled on the old Clay Hill farm, the headquarters of General Washington during the winter at Valley Forge. At Trenton, Lott continued school until, in 1836, the family removed to Quincy, Illinois. The following spring they all established themselves on a farm on Darden Prairie, near St. Charles, Missouri. There, Lott attended the St. Charles College for a couple of years, and Saint Louis University. At the university he enjoyed the fellowship, as a classmate, of William Tell Coleman, the head of the Vigilantes in maintaining law and order in San Francisco. Lott considered following the medical profession of his father and "studied medicine a short time, but changed to law and completed the course", receiving a law degree in 1846.

Lott entered the law office of Williams and Johnson at Quincy, Illinois, having a brother, Judge Peter Lott, in that town in the office of Clerk of the Circuit Court, who had served as judge of that court, having succeeded judge Stephen A. Douglas. At the breaking out of the Mexican War, however, Peter joined the American Army as captain, after appointing Charles as his clerical substitute, and at the Battle of Buena Vista distinguished himself for brave and effective service. In later years, he was appointed superintendent of the San Francisco Mint. In 1848, Lott was admitted to practice at the Supreme Court in Illinois, and "from the first it was remarked that he was able to hold his own with the other members of the Quincy bar, among whom may be mentioned both Abraham Lincoln and Stephen A. Douglas".

== Travel to California ==
As he was establishing himself in his profession, Lott's health broke down. Stirred by a desire to participate in the gold rush, he joined a party of young men who were arranging to make an overland journey to California. His father seriously disapproved the step, and even withheld the necessary funds; but Lott obtained what he needed by mortgaging his property, and on April 1, 1849, set out from Quincy by mule teams laden with mining tools. At the Humboldt River, the party broke up and the younger and unmarried men under the captaincy of Lott moved on by the northern or Lassen route, passing by Rabbit Hole Springs, Mud Lake, High Rock Canyon, and going from Deer Creek to the Lassen Rancho on the Feather River. At Long's Bar the journey of the pioneers ended. Lott began to mine at Long's Bar with the customary pick, shovel and pan, and then he spent the winter at Sacramento recruiting his health, returning to branches of the Feather River for another trial with the miner's tools. Relief came in the autumn of 1850 when the County of Butte was organized and lawyers were found to be scarce. Lott decided to resume the practice of law and soon enjoyed a lucrative patronage. It was more or less of a teaching experience, however, for excepting the judges themselves, Lott was the only one acquainted with legal procedure, and therefore the one who was kept busy instructing the officers.

Although he had voted for Lewis Cass at the first election when he cast his ballot, Lott really sympathized with the Democrats, and in a short time he became both a leader and an organizer here. In 1851, he was elected to the California State Senate, and there found himself yoked with or pitted against such men as Broderick, Frank Soule, Jacob Fry and T. B. Vanburen. He showed commendable activity and effected improvements and reforms. He got the state printing let by contract and opposed the infamous Water Lots Bill, having to do with the water-fronts at San Francisco. Declining renomination despite the urgent appeals of a large constituency, Lott formed a partnership with Warren T. Sexton, and so continued the practice of law until 1858, when Sexton was elected judge of the Ninth District Court. When the seat of government was established at Oroville, Lott erected there the first brick office building in Butte County; and in that building he maintained his law office from 1856 on.

In 1869, Lott was elected judge in the Second Judicial District, which comprised the counties of Butte, Tehama, Plumas and Lassen, serving from 1870 to 1878. This extensive circuit gave him plenty to do. On his retirement from the bench he resumed the practice of law, and "exerted a wide, powerful and beneficial influence in civic affairs in the community". He was a Union Democrat and as such consistently supported the administration; but he was opposed to the extension of federal power.

In 1861 Lott had purchased on Big Butte Creek, twenty-seven hundred acres, which was a portion of the Neal or Esquon Grant, and going in for gravel-range mining he was rewarded with returns properly remunerative. In 1866, he located a range on the borders of Plumas and Butte Counties, and three years later located another at Willow Bar which was controlled by the Yellow Creek Canal and Mining Company. Eighty thousand dollars was spent to build a canal to convey the washings of Yellow Creek for hydraulic mining; but in the spring of 1887, when the task was completed, Lott was served with an injunction under the mining debris act, and sold his ranch on Big Butte Creek to be subdivided into small farms for state colonization and actual settlers. Lott also developed an interest in the citrus industry, and "instigated the first orange orchard in northern California". He was for many years a member of the Oroville Board of Trade and was president of the Oroville Citrus Association for twenty years.

== Personal life and death ==
In May, 1856, Lott married Susan F. Hyer, a native of Philadelphia, whose father was a well-known merchant there. Lott and his wife had two daughters (one of whom died in early childhood), and a son.

On July 1, 1918, Judge Lott celebrated his ninety-fourth birthday. On entering his ninety-fifth year he had the privilege and pleasure of entertaining many of his friends of long years' standing. He died on September 4, 1918. Lott's surviving daughter, Cornelia, had a noted romance with a farmhand named Jesse Sank, of which Lott disapproved. Cornelia and Sank therefore waited until after Lott's death, over twenty years after they became enamored, to marry.
