= Asian American Student Union =

American student organization

The Asian American Student Union is a student-led organization for Asian American and Pacific Islander students on the East Coast of America. It started in 1993 at the University of Florida. Its activities include organising vigils for incapacitated students, and 'fostering understanding of the current social climate' concerning its members.
