= Harry Lott (American politician) =

African-American politician in Louisiana (fl.1870)

Harry Lott was an African American Republican politician in Louisiana during Reconstruction. He was elected to the Louisiana House of Representatives, representing Rapides Parish, in 1868 and 1870.

Lott accused the registrar of Rapides Parish of refusing and omitting a large number of African Americans from the voter rolls.

Joseph B. Lott also represented Rapides Parish in the House. He and Harry Lott were among the "colored" legislators who appealed to U.S. President Ulysses S. Grant to intervene in a dispute with Governor Henry C. Warmoth.

He later worked as a night inspector at the United States Customs House.

His sister was allegedly a "Voudou queen".
