= Gul Muhammad Lot =

Pakistani politician

Member of the Pakistani Senate
- In office March 2009 – March 2015

Minister Environment
- In office 1993–1993

Member of Provincial Assembly
- In office 1990–1993

Personal details
- Education: London Business School and University of Sindh

Gul Muhammad Lot is a former member of the Senate of Pakistan.

He was born in Diplo area, Thar. He studied in London Business School and University of Sindh. He was elected as a Member of Provincial Assembly in 1990. He served as Minister of Environment in 1993, Member of Sindh Council in 2002 and Advisor to CM Sindh for Anti-Corruption in 2008. He served as a senator in Pakistan’s senate for a tenure of 6 years from March 2009 to March 2015. He was elected unopposed.

He is also the chairman of Mehran Group of Industries, a spice manufacturer.
