= Pemberton, New Jersey =

Borough in Burlington County, New Jersey, US

- Borough
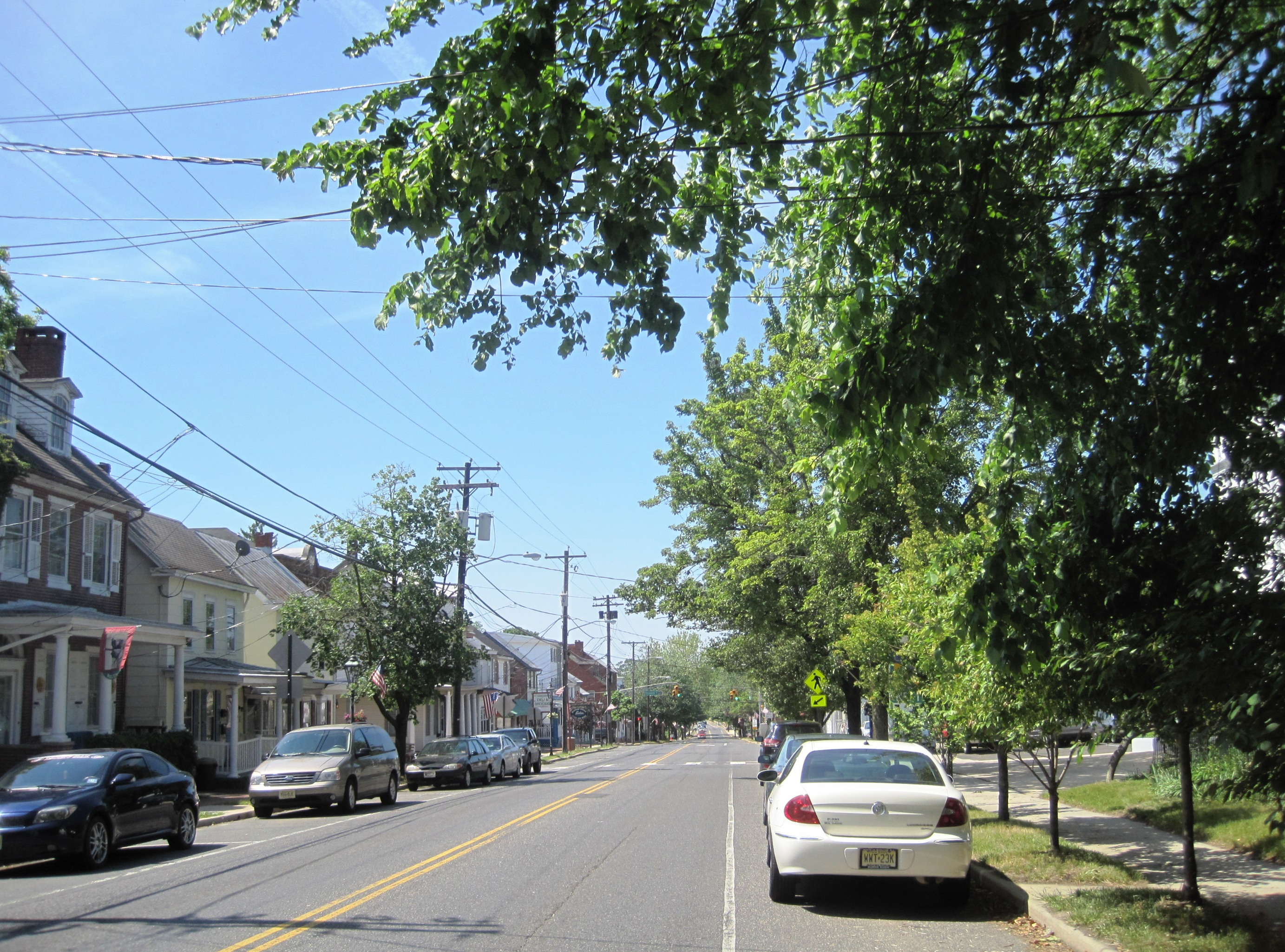
- Center of the Borough of Pemberton

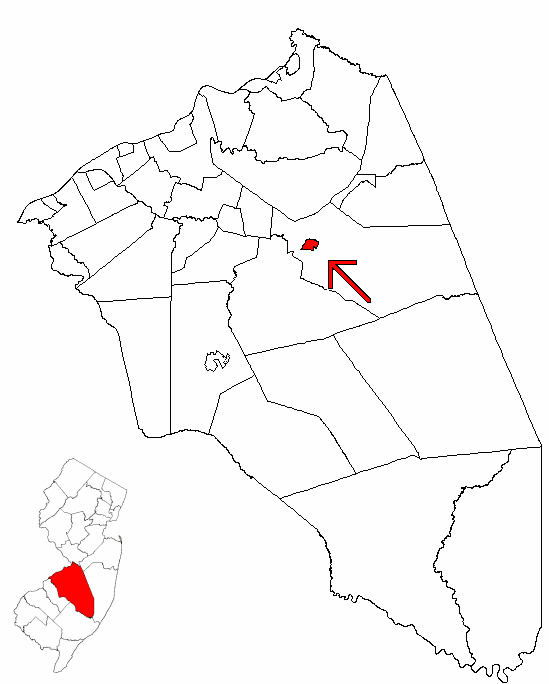
- Pemberton Borough highlighted in Burlington County. Inset map: Burlington County highlighted in the State of New Jersey.

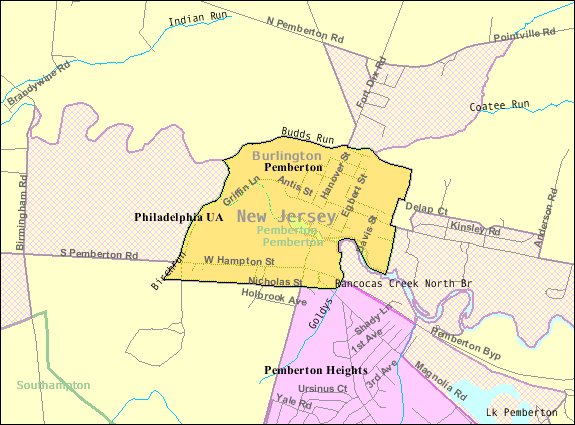
- Census Bureau map of Pemberton, New Jersey

- Location in Burlington County Location in New Jersey Location in the United States
- Coordinates: 39.97219°N 74.686558°W
- Country: United States
- State: New Jersey
- County: Burlington
- Incorporated: December 15, 1826

Government
  - Type: Borough
  - Body: Borough Council
  - Mayor: Harold Griffin (R, term ends December 31, 2023)
  - Municipal clerk: Kathy Smick

Area
  - Total: 0.61 sq mi (1.57 km^{2})
  - Land: 0.59 sq mi (1.53 km^{2})
  - Water: 0.015 sq mi (0.04 km^{2}) 2.79%
  - Rank: 540th of 565 in state 39th of 40 in county
- Elevation: 36 ft (11 m)

Population (2020)
  - Total: 1,371
  - Estimate (2023): 1,376
  - Rank: 518th of 565 in state 36th of 40 in county
  - Density: 2,325.2/sq mi (897.8/km^{2})
  - Rank: 268th of 565 in state 13th of 40 in county
- Time zone: UTC−05:00 (Eastern (EST))
  - Summer (DST): UTC−04:00 (Eastern (EDT))
- ZIP Code: 08068
- Area code: 609 exchanges: 726, 894
- FIPS code: 3400557480
- GNIS feature ID: 0885346
- Website: www.pembertonborough.us

Pemberton is a borough in Burlington County, in the U.S. state of New Jersey. As of the 2020 United States census, the borough's population was 1,371, a decrease of 38 (−2.7%) from the 2010 census count of 1,409, which in turn reflected an increase of 199 (+16.4%) from the 1,210 counted in the 2000 census. The township, and all of Burlington County, is a part of the Philadelphia metropolitan area.

Pemberton was incorporated as a borough by an act of the New Jersey Legislature on December 15, 1826, within portions of New Hanover Township and Northampton Township (now known as Mount Holly Township). Pemberton became an independent borough c. 1894. The borough is named for James Pemberton, a property owner in the area.

It is a dry community, where alcohol is not permitted to be sold legally, as affirmed by the most recent referendum which was held in 1980.

== Geography ==
According to the United States Census Bureau, the borough had a total area of 0.61 square miles (1.57 km^{2}), including 0.59 square miles (1.53 km^{2}) of land and 0.02 square miles (0.04 km^{2}) of water (2.79%).

Pemberton is an independent municipality within the boundaries of and completely surrounded by Pemberton Township, making it one of 21 pairs of "doughnut towns" in the state, where one municipality entirely surrounds another.

== Demographics ==
Historical population
Census	Pop.	Note	%±
1870	797		—
1880	799		0.3%
1890	834		4.4%
1900	771		−7.6%
1910	797		3.4%
1920	800		0.4%
1930	783		−2.1%
1940	906		15.7%
1950	1,194		31.8%
1960	1,250		4.7%
1970	1,344		7.5%
1980	1,198		−10.9%
1990	1,367		14.1%
2000	1,210		−11.5%
2010	1,409		16.4%
2020	1,371		−2.7%
2023 (est.)	1,376	▲	0.4%
Population sources: 1870–2000 1870–1920; 1870 1880–1890; 1890–1910 1910–1930; 1940–2000 2000; 2010 2020

=== 2010 census ===
The 2010 United States census counted 1,409 people, 581 households, and 404 families in the borough. The population density was 2,408.7 per square mile (930.0/km^{2}). There were 642 housing units at an average density of 1,097.5 per square mile (423.7/km^{2}). The racial makeup was 74.38% (1,048) White, 15.26% (215) Black or African American, 0.21% (3) Native American, 3.26% (46) Asian, 0.00% (0) Pacific Islander, 3.12% (44) from other races, and 3.76% (53) from two or more races. Hispanic or Latino of any race were 12.70% (179) of the population.

Of the 581 households, 25.1% had children under the age of 18; 51.3% were married couples living together; 13.1% had a female householder with no husband present and 30.5% were non-families. Of all households, 24.1% were made up of individuals and 6.9% had someone living alone who was 65 years of age or older. The average household size was 2.42 and the average family size was 2.79.

19.0% of the population were under the age of 18, 8.9% from 18 to 24, 25.2% from 25 to 44, 33.6% from 45 to 64, and 13.3% who were 65 years of age or older. The median age was 43.1 years. For every 100 females, the population had 90.7 males. For every 100 females ages 18 and older there were 90.5 males.

The Census Bureau's 2006–2010 American Community Survey showed that (in 2010 inflation-adjusted dollars) median household income was $65,568 (with a margin of error of +/− $9,899) and the median family income was $74,773 (+/− $17,679). Males had a median income of $44,750 (+/− $5,830) versus $46,406 (+/− $8,202) for females. The per capita income for the borough was $36,399 (+/− $6,078). About 2.8% of families and 6.0% of the population were below the poverty line, including 12.5% of those under age 18 and 1.8% of those age 65 or over.

=== 2000 census ===
As of the 2000 United States census there were 1,210 people, 470 households, and 316 families residing in the borough. The population density was 2,034.5 inhabitants per square mile (785.5/km^{2}). There were 513 housing units at an average density of 862.6 per square mile (333.1/km^{2}). The racial makeup of the borough was 78.43% White, 12.73% African American, 0.66% Native American, 2.40% Asian, 2.73% from other races, and 3.06% from two or more races. Hispanic or Latino of any race were 8.60% of the population.

There were 470 households, out of which 35.7% had children under the age of 18 living with them, 44.7% were married couples living together, 15.1% had a female householder with no husband present, and 32.6% were non-families. 26.4% of all households were made up of individuals, and 6.0% had someone living alone who was 65 years of age or older. The average household size was 2.56 and the average family size was 3.06.

In the borough the population was spread out, with 26.8% under the age of 18, 9.5% from 18 to 24, 34.7% from 25 to 44, 20.1% from 45 to 64, and 8.9% who were 65 years of age or older. The median age was 34 years. For every 100 females, there were 103.0 males. For every 100 females age 18 and over, there were 95.6 males.

The median income for a household in the borough was $44,063, and the median income for a family was $48,500. Males had a median income of $34,911 versus $25,474 for females. The per capita income for the borough was $18,909. About 7.2% of families and 7.8% of the population were below the poverty line, including 9.4% of those under age 18 and 1.0% of those age 65 or over.

== Government ==
=== Local government ===
Pemberton Borough is governed under the borough form of New Jersey municipal government, which is used in 218 municipalities (of the 564) statewide, making it the most common form of government in New Jersey. The governing body is comprised of a mayor and a borough council, with all positions elected at-large on a partisan basis as part of the November general election. A mayor is elected directly by the voters to a four-year term of office. The borough council includes six members elected to serve three-year terms on a staggered basis, with two seats coming up for election each year in a three-year cycle. The borough form of government used by Pemberton is a "weak mayor / strong council" government in which council members act as the legislative body with the mayor presiding at meetings and voting only in the event of a tie. The mayor can veto ordinances subject to an override by a two-thirds majority vote of the council. The mayor makes committee and liaison assignments for council members, and most appointments are made by the mayor with the advice and consent of the council.

As of 2023, the mayor of Pemberton Borough is Republican Harold Griffin, whose term of office ends December 31, 2023. Members of the Borough Council are Council President Terry Jerome (R, 2023), Karl "Nick" Conner (R, 2024), Diane Fanucci (R, 2025), Steven Fenster (D, 2025), Andrea Martin (R, 2024) and Melissa Tettemer (R, 2023; elected to serve an unexpired term).

In September 2020, Melissa Tettemer was chosen to fill the seat expiring in December 2023 that became vacant following the death of George Ward. Tettemer was elected in November 2020 to serve the rmaainedr of the term of office.

The borough council appointed Harold Griffin in January 2014 to fill the vacant seat of William Kochersperger, who had resigned from his seat as mayor that month.

=== Federal, state and county representation ===
Pemberton Borough is located in the 3rd Congressional District and is part of New Jersey's 8th state legislative district.

For the 119th United States Congress, New Jersey's 3rd congressional district is currently represented Herb Conaway (D, Delran Township). New Jersey is represented in the United States Senate by Democrats Cory Booker (Newark, term ends 2027) and Andy Kim (Moorestown, term ends 2031).

For the 2026–2027 session, the 8th legislative district of the New Jersey Legislature is represented in the New Jersey Senate by Latham Tiver (R, Southampton Township) and in the General Assembly by Anthony Angelozzi (D, Hammonton) and Andrea Katz (D, Chesterfield Township).

Burlington County is governed by a Board of County Commissioners comprised of five members who are chosen at-large in partisan elections to serve three-year terms of office on a staggered basis, with either one or two seats coming up for election each year; at an annual reorganization meeting, the board selects a director and deputy director from among its members to serve a one-year term. As of 2026, Burlington County's Commissioners are: Director Felicia Hopson (D, Willingboro Township, term as commissioner ends December 31, 2027; term as director ends 2026), Deputy Director Allison Eckel (D, Medford, term as commissioner ends 2028; term as deputy director ends 2026), Randy Brolo (D, Lumberton, 2026; elected to an unexpired term), Tyler Burrell (D, Delran Township, 2027) and Tom Pullion (D, Edgewater Park, 2026).

Burlington County's constitutional officers are Clerk Joanne Schwartz (D, Southampton Township, 2028), Sheriff James H. Kostoplis (D, Bordentown, 2028) and Surrogate Brian J. Carlin (D, Burlington Township, 2026).

=== Politics ===
United States presidential election results for Pemberton 2024 2020 2016 2012 2008 2004
Year	Republican		Democratic		Third party(ies)	
Year	No.	%	No.	%	No.	%
2024	320	46.24%	355	51.30%	17	2.46%
2020	330	47.62%	355	51.23%	8	1.15%
2016	302	47.26%	310	48.51%	27	4.23%
2012	294	45.65%	346	53.73%	4	0.62%
2008	295	42.94%	383	55.75%	9	1.31%
2004	259	56.92%	193	42.42%	3	0.66%

As of March 2011, there were a total of 883 registered voters in Pemberton, of which 250 (28.3% vs. 33.3% countywide) were registered as Democrats, 266 (30.1% vs. 23.9%) were registered as Republicans and 367 (41.6% vs. 42.8%) were registered as Unaffiliated. There were no voters registered to other parties. Among the borough's 2010 Census population, 62.7% (vs. 61.7% in Burlington County) were registered to vote, including 77.4% of those ages 18 and over (vs. 80.3% countywide).

In the 2012 presidential election, Democrat Barack Obama received 346 votes (52.9% vs. 58.1% countywide), ahead of Republican Mitt Romney with 294 votes (45.0% vs. 40.2%) and other candidates with 4 votes (0.6% vs. 1.0%), among the 654 ballots cast by the borough's 901 registered voters, for a turnout of 72.6% (vs. 74.5% in Burlington County). In the 2008 presidential election, Democrat Barack Obama received 383 votes (55.4% vs. 58.4% countywide), ahead of Republican John McCain with 295 votes (42.7% vs. 39.9%) and other candidates with 9 votes (1.3% vs. 1.0%), among the 691 ballots cast by the borough's 882 registered voters, for a turnout of 78.3% (vs. 80.0% in Burlington County). In the 2004 presidential election, Republican George W. Bush received 259 votes (56.9% vs. 46.0% countywide), ahead of Democrat John Kerry with 193 votes (42.4% vs. 52.9%) and other candidates with 3 votes (0.7% vs. 0.8%), among the 455 ballots cast by the borough's 591 registered voters, for a turnout of 77.0% (vs. 78.8% in the whole county).

Gubernatorial election results for Pemberton
Year	Republican		Democratic		Third party(ies)	
Year	No.	%	No.	%	No.	%
2025	252	44.60%	310	54.87%	3	0.53%
2021	232	52.13%	213	47.87%	0	0.00%
2017	192	49.74%	187	48.45%	7	1.81%
2013	320	70.48%	129	28.41%	5	1.10%
2009	229	50.11%	185	40.48%	43	9.41%
2005	134	54.69%	92	37.55%	19	7.76%

In the 2013 gubernatorial election, Republican Chris Christie received 320 votes (69.1% vs. 61.4% countywide), ahead of Democrat Barbara Buono with 129 votes (27.9% vs. 35.8%) and other candidates with 5 votes (1.1% vs. 1.2%), among the 463 ballots cast by the borough's 902 registered voters, yielding a 51.3% turnout (vs. 44.5% in the county). In the 2009 gubernatorial election, Republican Chris Christie received 229 votes (48.4% vs. 47.7% countywide), ahead of Democrat Jon Corzine with 185 votes (39.1% vs. 44.5%), Independent Chris Daggett with 38 votes (8.0% vs. 4.8%) and other candidates with 5 votes (1.1% vs. 1.2%), among the 473 ballots cast by the borough's 897 registered voters, yielding a 52.7% turnout (vs. 44.9% in the county).

United States Senate election results for Pemberton1
Year	Republican		Democratic		Third party(ies)	
Year	No.	%	No.	%	No.	%
2024	279	41.58%	377	56.18%	15	2.24%
2018	261	48.69%	246	45.90%	29	5.41%
2012	278	46.18%	322	53.49%	2	0.33%
2006	174	61.48%	99	34.98%	10	3.53%

United States Senate election results for Pemberton2
Year	Republican		Democratic		Third party(ies)	
Year	No.	%	No.	%	No.	%
2020	318	47.60%	342	51.20%	8	1.20%
2014	209	51.73%	190	47.03%	5	1.24%
2013	152	51.35%	139	46.96%	5	1.69%
2008	278	44.34%	335	53.43%	14	2.23%

== Historic district ==
- Pemberton Historic District
- U.S. National Register of Historic Places
- U.S. Historic district
- New Jersey Register of Historic Places
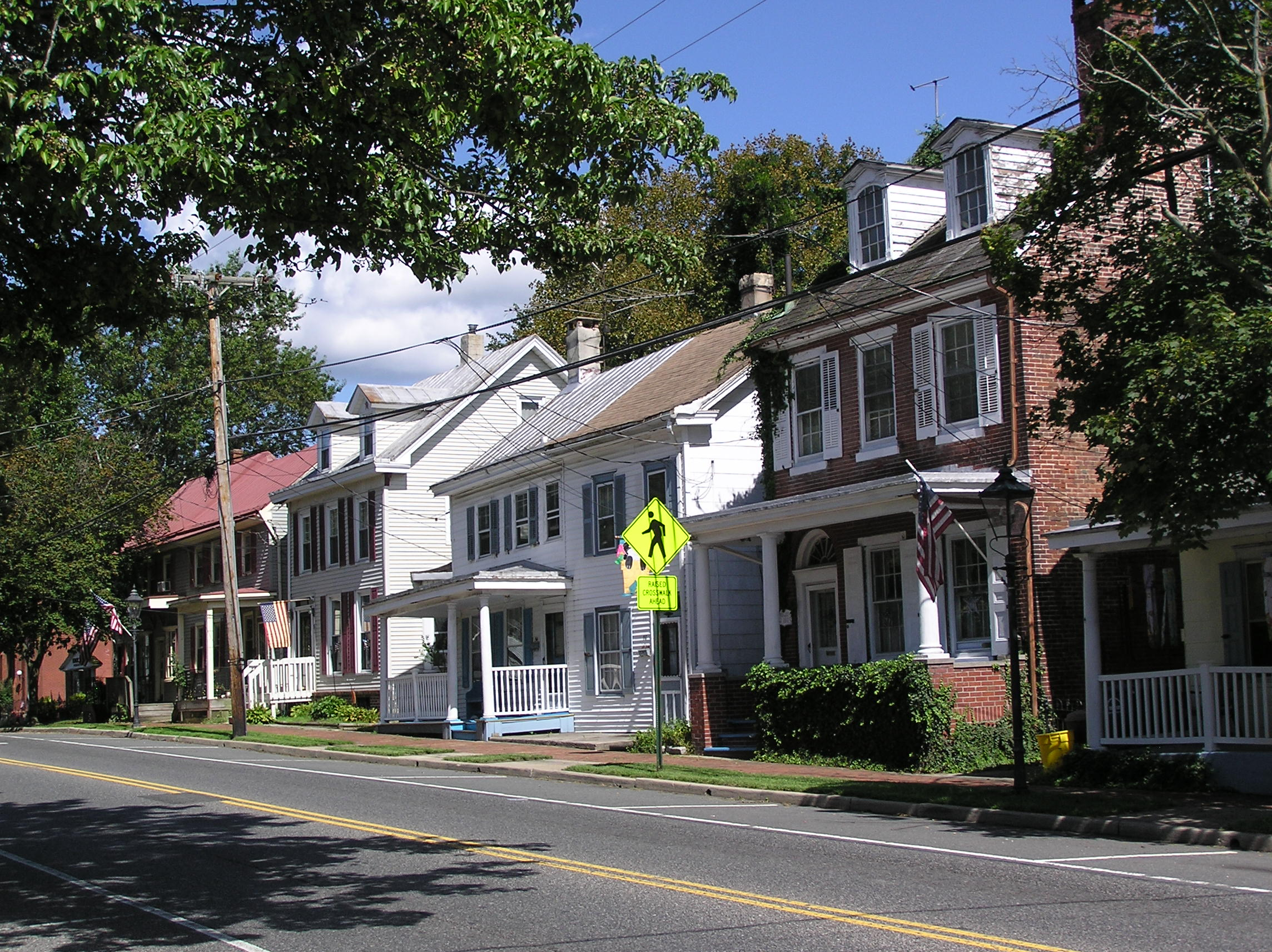
- Houses on Hanover Street
- Location: Portions of Budd Avenue; Early Alley; Jarvis, Hanover, Hough, Egbert, Davis, Mary, Antis, Elizabeth, Early, Pemberton, Jane, Reeves, Reynolds, and St. John streets
- Area: 94 acres (38 ha)
- Architectural style: Classical Revival, Late Victorian, Federal
- NRHP reference No.: 88000688
- NJRHP No.: 858

Significant dates
- Added to NRHP: March 22, 1989
- Designated NJRHP: October 7, 1987

The Pemberton Historic District is a 94-acre (38 ha) historic district encompassing the borough. It was added to the National Register of Historic Places on March 22, 1989, for its significance in historic archaeology, architecture, industry, religion and exploration/settlement. The district has 180 contributing buildings, including the individually listed Morris Mansion and Mill.

The First Baptist Church was organized in 1752. The current church on Hanover Street was built in 1861 with Greek Revival style. The Methodist Church was founded in 1774, the third in the state. The current church was built in 1895.

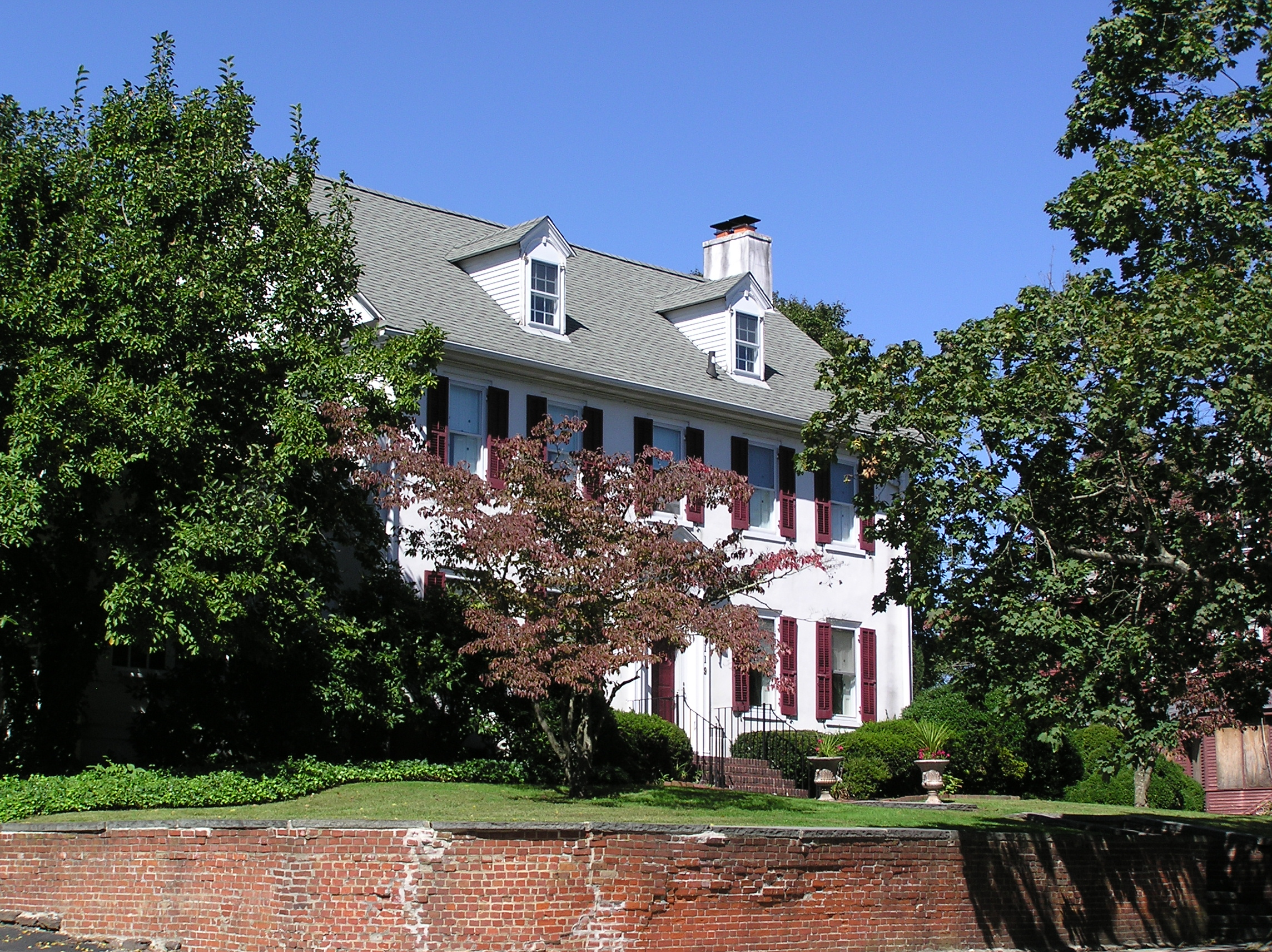
Morris Mansion and Mill

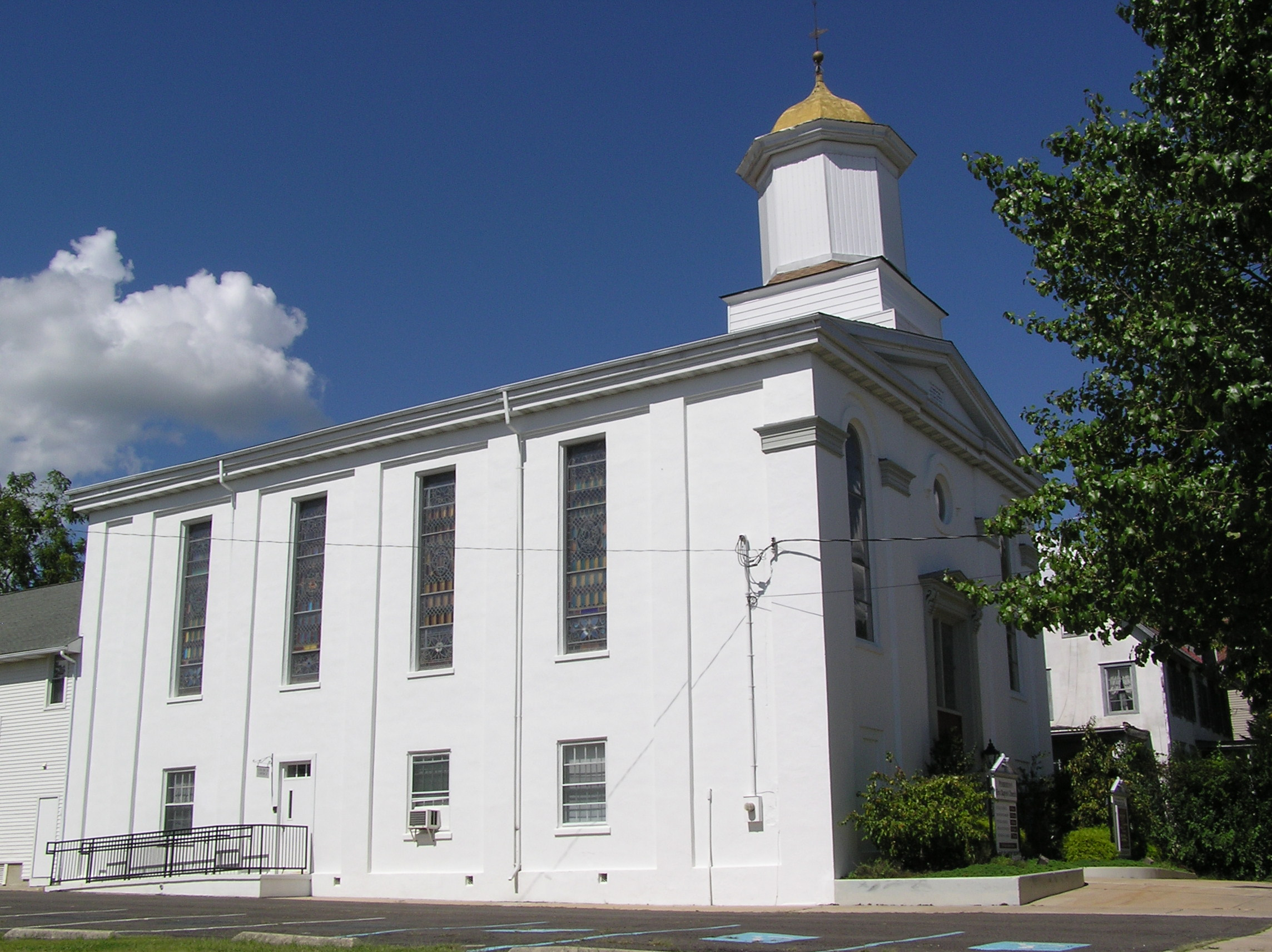
First Baptist Church

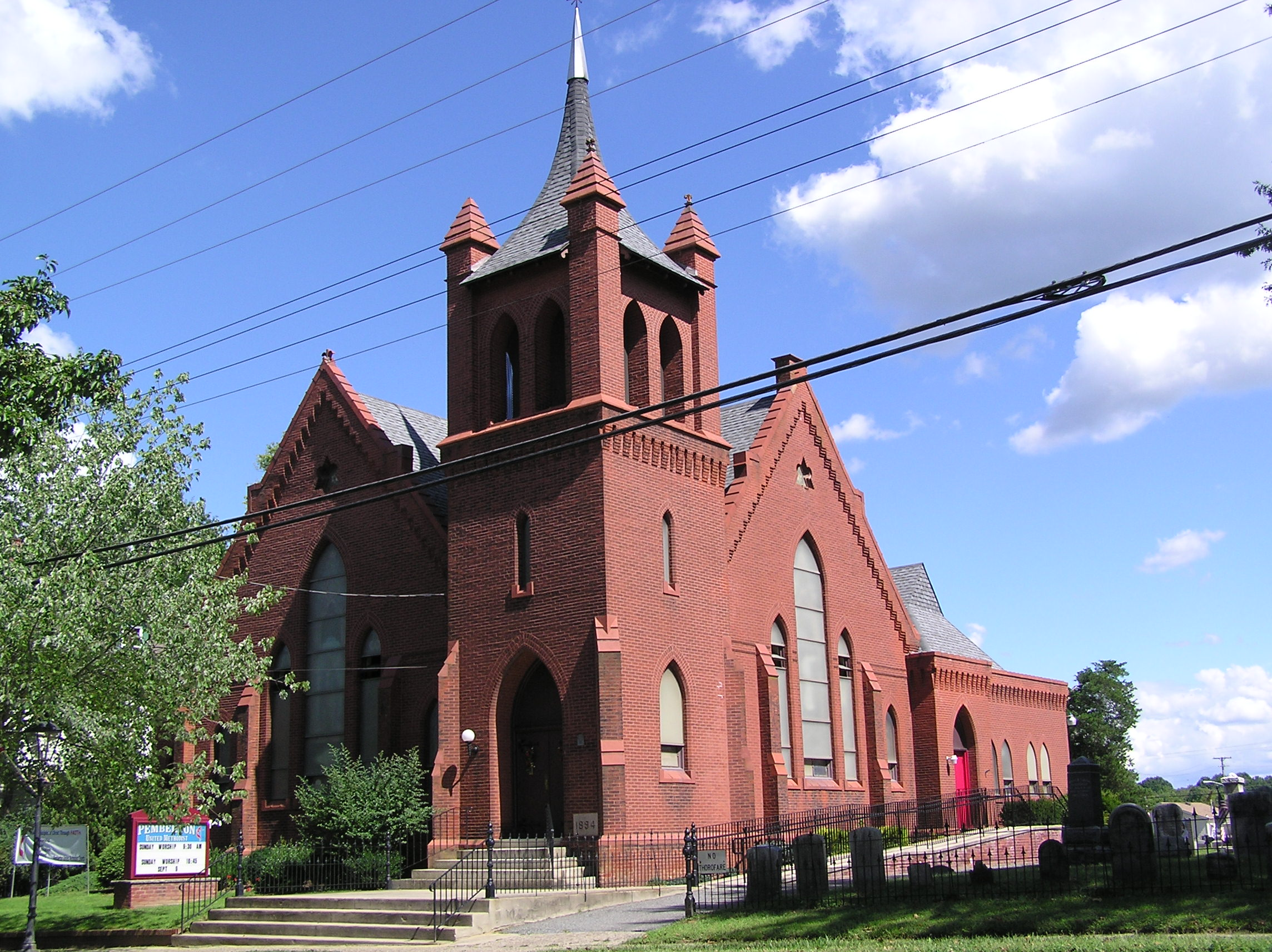
United Methodist Church

== Education ==
The Pemberton Borough School District is no longer operational. Starting with the 2007–08 school year, all public school students from Pemberton Borough attend the schools of the Pemberton Township School District, with Pemberton Borough a part of the combined school district. The district is one of 31 former Abbott districts statewide that were established pursuant to the decision by the New Jersey Supreme Court in Abbott v. Burke which are now referred to as "SDA Districts" based on the requirement for the state to cover all costs for school building and renovation projects in these districts under the supervision of the New Jersey Schools Development Authority. The school district serves Pemberton Borough and Pemberton Township (including the communities of Browns Mills, Country Lake Estates, Pemberton Heights and Presidential Lakes Estates and the Pemberton Township portion of Fort Dix). As of the 2021–22 school year, the district, comprising nine schools, had an enrollment of 4,443 students. Schools in the district (with 2021–22 enrollment data from the National Center for Education Statistics) are Pemberton Early Childhood Education Center (with 416 students; PreK), Samuel T. Busansky Elementary School (281; 3–5), Denbo-Crichton Elementary School (850; K–5), Howard L. Emmons Elementary School (293; K–2), Fort Dix Elementary School (317; PreK–5), Joseph S. Stackhouse Elementary School (223; K–2), Marcus Newcomb Middle School (307; 6), Helen A. Fort Middle School (661; 7–8) and Pemberton Township High School (1,029; 9–12).

Students from Pemberton, and from all of Burlington County, are eligible to attend the Burlington County Institute of Technology, a countywide public school district that serves the vocational and technical education needs of students at the high school and post-secondary level at its campuses in Medford and Westampton.

== Transportation ==
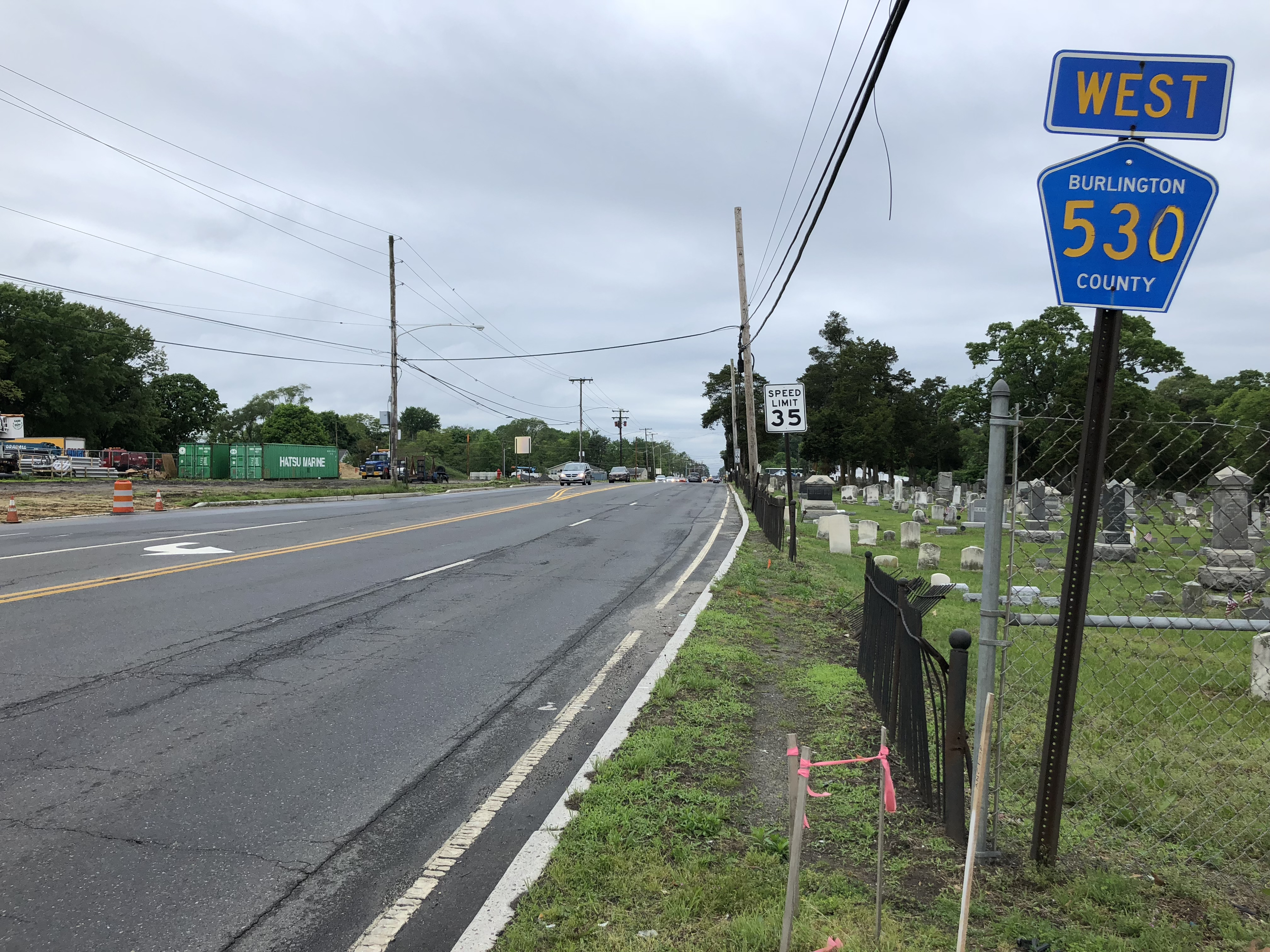
County Route 530 in Pemberton

=== Roads and highways ===
As of May 2010, the borough had a total of 8.81 miles (14.18 km) of roadways, of which 4.99 miles (8.03 km) were maintained by the municipality and 3.82 miles (6.15 km) by Burlington County.

No Interstate, U.S. or state highways directly serve Pemberton. The most significant roadway passing through the borough is County Route 530.

=== Public transportation ===
NJ Transit provides bus service in the township on the 317 route between Asbury Park and Philadelphia. BurLink bus service is offered on the B1 route between Beverly and Pemberton.

== Notable people ==
People who were born in, residents of, or otherwise closely associated with Pemberton include:

- Jeff Celentano (born 1960), actor, screenwriter and director
- George Franklin Fort (1808–1872), 16th Governor of New Jersey
- John Franklin Fort (1852–1920), 33rd Governor of New Jersey, from 1908 to 1911
- Bushrod W. Lott (1826–1886), politician in the Minnesota Territory who served as United States Consul in Tehuantepec, Mexico, from 1862 to 1865, appointed by President Abraham Lincoln
- Rex Marshall (1919–1983), actor, television announcer and radio personality
- Isaac Witkin (1936–2006), sculptor
