= John Evans =

John Evans may refer to:

== Academics ==
- John Evans (archaeologist) (1823–1908), English archaeologist and geologist
- John Evans (topographical writer) (1768–c. 1812), writer on Wales
- John Cayo Evans (1879–1958), Welsh mathematician
- John Davies Evans (1925–2011), English archaeologist
- John Gwenogvryn Evans (1852–1930), Welsh minister and paleographer
- John Gwynne Evans (1945–2005), British archaeologist
- John Robert Evans (1929–2015), Canadian cardiologist and civic leader
- John V. Evans (astronomer) (born 1933), British-American
- John Wainwright Evans (1909–1999), solar astronomer
- John William Evans (geologist) (1857–1930), British
- John William Evans (entomologist) (1906–1990), British entomologist

== Entertainment ==
- John Evans (actor) (1693–1734), Irish actor
- John Evans (19th-century writer) (died 1832), English writer
- John Evans (artist) (1932–2012), American artist
- John Evans (director), American film director and screenwriter
- John Evans (special effects), on five James Bond films
- John Bryan Evans (born 1980), Welsh filmmaker
- John Morgan Evans (1942–1991), American actor and playwright
- Jon Evans (born 1973), Canadian novelist and journalist
- John Evans or I. D. Ffraid (1814–1875), Welsh poet

== Sports ==
=== Association football ===
- John Evans (footballer, born 1859) (1859–1939), Welsh footballer for Oswestry Town
- John Evans (footballer, born 1900) (1900–?), English footballer for Sheffield United, Walsall, and Stoke
- John Evans (footballer, born 1929) (1929–2004), English footballer for Liverpool
- John Evans (footballer, born 1932) (1932–2009), English footballer
- John Evans (footballer, born 1941), footballer for Chester City
- John Evans (bowls) (1947–2026), Torquay footballer and bowler
- Jonny Evans (born 1988), Northern Irish footballer for Manchester United
- Ted Evans (footballer) (John Edward Evans, 1868–1942), English footballer for Stoke and Port Vale

=== Cricket ===
- John Evans (cricketer, born 1889) (1889–1960), English cricketer
- John Evans (Kent cricketer) (fl. 1820s), English cricketer

=== Gridiron football ===
- John C. Evans (fl. 1930–1965), American football and basketball player and coach
- John Evans (American football) (born 1964), tight end
- Johnny Evans (gridiron football, born 1956), American football player and radio commentator
- Johnny Evans (Canadian football, born 1897) (1897–1932), Canadian football player

=== Rugby ===
- Jack Evans (rugby, born 1871) (1871–1924), or John, Welsh rugby union and rugby league forward
- Jack Elwyn Evans (1897–1941), or John, Welsh rugby union and rugby league wing or centre
- Jack Evans (English rugby league, born 1897) (John Evans, 1897–1940), English professional rugby league centre
- John Evans (rugby union, born 1911) (1911–1943), Welsh international rugby union hooker
- John Evans (rugby union, born 1926) (1926–1989), Welsh international rugby union player
- John Hart Evans (1881–1959), Welsh rugby union centre
- Jack Evans (rugby union, born 1875) (John William Evans, 1875–1947), Welsh rugby union forward

=== Other sports ===
- John Russell Evans (1935–2025), Welsh lawn bowler
- John Evans (canoeist) (born 1949), American slalom canoer
- John Evans (football manager), with several Gaelic football teams
- John Evans (Gaelic footballer) (born 1955), Irish Gaelic footballer
- Paul Evans (ice hockey, born 1954) (John Paul Evans), Canadian ice hockey player
- John Evans (Australian footballer, born 1950), Australian footballer
- John Evans (fencer), Welsh fencer
- John Evans, British head-balancing strongman

== Music ==
- John Evan (born 1948), or Evans, English musician with Jethro Tull
- John Evans (Box Tops) (1948–2020), American musician with the Box Tops
- John Rhys Evans (1930–2010), Welsh operatic baritone

== Politics ==
=== Canada ===
- John Evans (British Columbia politician) (1816–1879), Canadian miner and politician in British Columbia
- John Evans (Saskatchewan politician) (1867–1958), Welsh-born Canadian politician from Saskatchewan
- John Leslie Evans (born 1941), Canadian politician from Ontario
- John Newell Evans (1846–1944), Welsh-born Canadian politician from British Columbia

=== United Kingdom ===
- John Evans (died 1565), English politician from Shrewsbury
- John Evans, 5th Baron Carbery (1738–1807), Irish peer
- John Evans (Ogmore MP) (1875–1961), Welsh politician from Ogmore
- John Evans, Baron Evans of Parkside (1930–2016)
- John Evans (Haverfordwest MP) (died 1864), MP for Haverfordwest 1847–1852
- John William Evans (Welsh politician) (1870–1906), Liberal politician in Aberdare, South Wales

=== United States ===
- John Evans (Colorado governor) (1814–1897), 2nd territorial governor of Colorado
- John Evans (Colorado state senator), member of the Colorado Senate
- John Evans (Idaho politician) (1925–2014), governor of Idaho
- John Evans (judge) (1728–1783), associate justice of the Supreme Court of Pennsylvania
- John Evans (Pennsylvania governor) (1678–?), governor of Pennsylvania
- John Gary Evans (1863–1942), governor of South Carolina
- John M. Evans (Montana politician) (1863–1946), member of congress from Montana
- John M. Evans (Wisconsin politician) (1820–1903), physician and politician
- John Marshall Evans (born 1950), ambassador to Armenia
- John R. Evans (born 1955), from Pennsylvania

=== Other politicians ===
- John Evans (Australian politician) (1855–1943), in Tasmania

== Religion ==
- John Evans (1702–1782), Welsh anti-Methodist Anglican priest
- John Evans (Baptist) (1767–1827), Welsh minister
- John Evans (bishop) (c. 1652–1724), Welsh-born bishop of Bangor and bishop of Meath
- John Evans (died 1779), Welsh Anglican priest and curate of Portsmouth
- John Evans (divine) (1680–1730), Welsh divine and writer
- John Evans (Methodist) (1779–1847), Welsh Methodist of Llwynffortun
- St John Evans (1905–1956), Anglican cleric in Africa
- John Evans (archdeacon of Llandaff) (c. 1695–1749)
- John Evans (archdeacon of Malta) (1919–1988), Archdeacon of Malta
- John Evans (archdeacon of Surrey) (1915–1996), Anglican priest
- John Silas Evans (1864–1953), Welsh astronomer and priest

== Other ==
- John Evans (explorer) (1770–1799), Welsh explorer of the Missouri River
- John Evans (pirate) (died 1723), Welsh pirate
- John Evans (printer) (1774–1828), English printer
- John Evans (Royal Navy officer) (1717–1794)
- John Evans (surgeon) (1756–1846), Welsh surgeon
- John B. Evans (1938–2004), Welsh-American media executive
- John D. Evans, American business executive and philanthropist
- John Grimley Evans (1936–2018), British gerontologist
- John Henry Evans (1872–1947), American Mormon educator and writer
- John Louis Evans (1950–1983), American convicted murderer
- John Maxwell Evans (born 1942), Canadian judge
- John Morton Evans (1871–1956), British philatelist
- John R. Evans Jr. (born 1966), United States Army general
- John Evans (1877–1990), Welsh supercentenarian; see list of British supercentenarians

== See also ==
- Jack Evans (disambiguation)
- Jonathan Evans (disambiguation)
- John Evans House (disambiguation)
- John William Evans (disambiguation)
