= Evans House =

Evans House may refer to:

in the US

- Evans-Kirby House, Harrison, Arkansas
- Evans House (Phoenix, Arizona)
- Byers-Evans House, Denver, Colorado, also known as Evans House and listed in that name as a Denver Landmark
- Anne Evans Mountain Home, Evergreen, Colorado
- Ebenezer Evans House, Southington, Connecticut
- George Evans House, Newark, Delaware
- John Evans House (Newark, Delaware)
- J. B. Evans House, Delray Beach, Florida
- Wheeler-Evans House, Oviedo, Florida
- D. L. Evans, Sr., Bungalow, Malad City, Idaho
- Cole-Evans House, Noblesville, Indiana
- Edward B. and Nettie E. Evans House, Des Moines, Iowa
- Henry and Elizabeth Adkinson Evans House, Winterset, Iowa
- Evans House (Shopville, Kentucky), Listed on the NRHP in Pulaski County
- Thomas P. Evans House, Tompkinsville, Kentucky, Listed on the NRHP in Monroe County
- Hudson-Evans House, Detroit, Michigan
- Musgrove Evans House, Tecumseh, Michigan
- Christmas Gift Evans House, Helena, Montana
- Smith-Buntura-Evans House, Natchez, Mississippi, listed on the NRHP in Adams County
- Dr. Carroll D. and Lorena R. North Evans House, Columbus, Nebraska
- Amos Evans House, Marlton, New Jersey
- Stokes–Evans House, Marlton, New Jersey
- William and Susan Evans House, Marlton, New Jersey
- Evans–Cooper House, Evesham Township, New Jersey
- Evans-Gaige-Dillenback House, Chaumont, New York
- Cornelius H. Evans House, Hudson, New York, Listed
- E. Hervey Evans House, Laurinburg, North Carolina
- Mohrman-Jack-Evans House, Lebanon, Ohio
- Vaugh-Stacy-Evans Farm Historic District, Lowell, Ohio, listed on the NRHP in Ohio
- Evans-Holton-Owens House, Newark, Ohio, listed on the NRHP in Ohio
- Wilson Bruce Evans House, Oberlin, Ohio
- Evans House (Vinton, Ohio), listed on the NRHP in Vinton County
- Richard W. Evans House, Worthington, Ohio, Listed on the NRHP in Ohio
- Ann Cunningham Evans House, Caernarvon, Pennsylvania
- William and Mordecai Evans House, Limerick Township, Pennsylvania
- Benjamin Evans House, Nescopeck, Pennsylvania
- Evans-Russell House, Spartanburg, South Carolina
- Brown-Evans House, Mobridge, South Dakota
- John and Coralin Evans Ranch, Piedmont, South Dakota, listed on the NRHP in Meade County
- Robert H. Evans House, Spearfish, South Dakota, Listed on the NRHP in Lawrence County
- Green-Evans House, Lynchburg, Tennessee
- Winston Evans House, Shelbyville, Tennessee
- J. W. Evans House, Abilene, Texas, Listed on the NRHP in Taylor County
- Britton-Evans House, Corpus Christi, Texas, listed on the NRHP in Nueces County
- Annie Laurie Evans Hall, Prairie View, Texas, listed on the NRHP in Waller County
- Evans House No. 2, Prices Fork, Virginia
- Evans House (Salem, Virginia)
- Evans-Tibbs House, Washington, D.C.
- John Evans House (Martinsburg, West Virginia)
- Jonathan H. Evans House, Platteville, Wisconsin
