= 1932 in association football =

The following are the football (soccer) events of the year 1932 throughout the world.

== Winners club national championship ==
- Argentina: River Plate
- Belgium: Lierse S.K.
- England: Everton F.C.
- France: Olympique Lillois
- Germany: Bayern Munich
- Iceland: KR
- Italy: Juventus
- Mandatory Palestine: British Police
- Netherlands: Ajax Amsterdam
- Poland: Cracovia
- Romania: Venus București
- Scotland:
  - Division One: Motherwell F.C.
  - Scottish Cup: Rangers F.C.
- Soviet Union: team of Moscow
- Spain: Real Madrid
- Turkey: İstanbulspor

== International tournaments ==
- 1932 British Home Championship (September 19, 1931 – April 9, 1932)

England

- Balkan Cup 1932 in Yugoslavia (June 26 – July 3, 1932)

Bulgaria

- Baltic Cup 1932 in Latvia (August 28–30, 1932)

Latvia

- 1929-32 Nordic Football Championship (June 14, 1929 – September 25, 1932)
  1932: (June 10 – September 25, 1932)

Norway (1932)
Norway (1929–1932)

- II. Dr. Gerö Cup (February 22, 1931 – October 28, 1932)

Austria

== Births ==
- January 5: Bill Foulkes, English international footballer and manager (died 2013)
- January 9: Arne Høivik, Norwegian international footballer (died 2017)
- January 25: Harry Nicholson, English professional footballer (died 2015)
- February 24: William Pringle, English professional footballer (died 2006)
- February 27: László Sárosi, Hungarian international footballer (died 2016)
- February 28: Noel Cantwell, Irish international footballer (died 2005)
- March 17: Tom Redding, English professional footballer (died 1980)
- April 12: Guy Schmidt, Luxembourgian footballer
- April 16: Henk Schouten, Dutch footballer (died 2018)
- May 15: Turgay Şeren, Turkish international footballer (died 2016)
- June 22: Salvador Farfán, Mexican midfielder
- June 25: Valeriu Soare, Romanian forward
- July 11: Laurie Bolton, English professional footballer (died 2018)
- August 11: Giovanni Di Veroli, Italian footballer (died 2018)
- September 7: Rolf Holmström, Swedish footballer (died 2012)
- September 11: Peter Anderson, English club footballer (died 2009)
- October 12: Tom Fairley, English professional footballer (died 2018)
- October 20: Brian Slater, English professional footballer (died 1999)
- October 21: John Evans, English professional footballer (died 2009)
- November 3: Guillaume Bieganski, French international footballer (died 2016)
- November 22: Günter Sawitzki, German international goalkeeper (died 2020)
- December 23: Arnold Walker, English professional footballer (died 2017)
