= John Evans House =

John Evans House may refer to:

- John Evans House (Newark, Delaware), listed on the NRHP in New Castle County, Delaware
- John Evans House (Martinsburg, West Virginia), listed on the NRHP in Berkeley County, West Virginia

== See also ==
- John Evans (disambiguation)
- Evans House (disambiguation)
