= John William Evans =

John William Evans may refer to:

- Sir John Evans (Australian politician) (1855–1943), Premier of Tasmania, 1904–1909
- John William Evans (geologist) (1857–1930), British geologist
- John William Evans (Welsh politician) (1870–1906), Liberal local politician in South Wales
- Jack Evans (rugby union, born 1875) (1875–1947), Wales international rugby player
- John William Evans (entomologist) (1906–1990), British entomologist

== See also ==
- John Evans (disambiguation)
