= Jack Evans =

Jack Evans may refer to:

== Sports ==
=== Association football ===
- Jack Evans (footballer, born 1889) (1889–1971), Welsh international footballer
- Jack Evans (footballer, born 1993), English footballer
- Jack Evans (footballer, born 1998), Welsh footballer
- Jack Evans (footballer, born 2000), English footballer

=== Australian football ===
- Jack Evans (footballer, born 1891) (1891–1966), Australian rules footballer for Melbourne
- Jack Evans (footballer, born 1908) (1908–1960), Australian rules footballer for Geelong
- Jack Evans (footballer, born 1930), Australian rules footballer for St Kilda

=== Rugby ===
- Jack Evans (rugby, born 1871) (1871–1924), rugby union and rugby league player who played in the 1890s
- Jack Evans (rugby union, born 1875) (1875–1947), rugby union plater for Wales and Blaina
- Jack Elwyn Evans (1897–1941), rugby union and rugby league player who played in the 1920s for Wales
- Jack Evans (English rugby league, born 1897) (1897–1940), rugby league player who played in the 1920s
- Jack Evans (rugby, born 1922) (1922–1993), rugby union and rugby league player for Newport (RU), Great Britain (RL), Wales and Hunslet

=== Other sports ===
- Jack Evans (American football) (1905–1980), American football player
- Jack Evans (ice hockey) (1928–1996), Canadian hockey player and coach in the NHL
- Jack Evans (wrestler) (born 1982), American

== Politics ==
- Jack Wilson Evans (1922–1997), mayor of Dallas, Texas, 1981–1983
- Jack Evans (Australian politician) (1928–2009), Australian senator
- Jack Evans (Washington, D.C., politician) (born 1953), member of the Council of the District of Columbia

== Others ==
- Jack Evans (musician) (born 1953), American drummer and composer in Reverend Zen
- Jack Evans (EastEnders), a minor character in the BBC soap EastEnders
- Jack Evans (television presenter), a presenter on Behind The News

== See also ==
- John Evans (disambiguation)
