= John Evans (governor) =

John Evans (governor) may refer to:

- John Evans (Colorado governor) (1814–1897), 2nd Governor of the Territory of Colorado
- John Evans (Pennsylvania governor) (1678–?), 13th Colonial Governor of Pennsylvania
- John Gary Evans (1863–1942), 85th Governor of South Carolina
- John Evans (Idaho governor) (1925–2014), 27th Governor of Idaho

== See also ==
- John Evans (disambiguation)
