= 1932–33 Football League =

41st season of the Football League

The Football League
- Season: 1932–33
- Champions: Arsenal
- New Teams in League: Aldershot; Newport County

The 1932–33 season was the 41st season of The Football League.

== Final league tables ==
Match results are drawn from The Rec.Sport.Soccer Statistics Foundation website and Rothmans for the First Division and from Rothmans for the Second Division and for the two Third Divisions.

From the 1922–23 season onwards, re-election was required of the bottom two teams of both the Third Division North and Third Division South leagues.

== First Division ==
First Division
- Season: 1932–33
- Champions: Arsenal; 2nd English title
- Relegated: Bolton Wanderers; Blackpool
- Matches: 462
- Goals: 1,645 (3.56 per match)
- Top goalscorer: Jack Bowers (35 goals)
- Biggest home win: Arsenal 8–0 Blackburn Rovers (25 February 1933)
- Biggest away win: Wolverhampton Wanderers 1–7 Arsenal (5 November 1932)
- Highest scoring: Sunderland 7–4 Bolton Wanderers (20 October 1932); Arsenal 9–2 Sheffield United (24 December 1932); Blackburn Rovers 6–5 Blackpool (2 January 1933); Liverpool 7–4 Everton (11 February 1933)

Pos	Team	Pld	W	D	L	GF	GA	GAv	Pts	Relegation
1	Arsenal (C)	42	25	8	9	118	61	1.934	58	
2	Aston Villa	42	23	8	11	92	67	1.373	54	
3	Sheffield Wednesday	42	21	9	12	80	68	1.176	51	
4	West Bromwich Albion	42	20	9	13	83	70	1.186	49	
5	Newcastle United	42	22	5	15	71	63	1.127	49	
6	Huddersfield Town	42	18	11	13	66	53	1.245	47	
7	Derby County	42	15	14	13	76	69	1.101	44	
8	Leeds United	42	15	14	13	59	62	0.952	44	
9	Portsmouth	42	18	7	17	74	76	0.974	43	
10	Sheffield United	42	17	9	16	74	80	0.925	43	
11	Everton	42	16	9	17	81	74	1.095	41	
12	Sunderland	42	15	10	17	63	80	0.788	40	
13	Birmingham	42	14	11	17	57	57	1.000	39	
14	Liverpool	42	14	11	17	79	84	0.940	39	
15	Blackburn Rovers	42	14	10	18	76	102	0.745	38	
16	Manchester City	42	16	5	21	68	71	0.958	37	
17	Middlesbrough	42	14	9	19	63	73	0.863	37	
18	Chelsea	42	14	7	21	63	73	0.863	35	
19	Leicester City	42	11	13	18	75	89	0.843	35	
20	Wolverhampton Wanderers	42	13	9	20	80	96	0.833	35	
21	Bolton Wanderers (R)	42	12	9	21	78	92	0.848	33	Relegation to the Second Division
22	Blackpool (R)	42	14	5	23	69	85	0.812	33	Relegation to the Second Division

Source: World Football
Rules for classification: 1) Points; 2) Goal average; 3) Goals scored
(C) Champions; (R) Relegated

=== Results ===
Home \ Away	ARS	AST	BIR	BLB	BLP	BOL	CHE	DER	EVE	HUD	LEE	LEI	LIV	MCI	MID	NEW	POR	SHU	SHW	SUN	WBA	WOL
Arsenal		5–0	3–0	8–0	1–1	3–2	4–1	3–3	2–1	2–2	1–2	8–2	0–1	2–1	4–2	1–0	2–0	9–2	4–2	6–1	1–2	1–2
Aston Villa	5–3		1–0	4–0	6–2	6–1	3–1	2–0	2–1	0–3	0–0	4–2	5–2	1–1	3–1	3–0	4–1	3–0	3–6	1–0	3–2	1–3
Birmingham	0–1	3–2		3–1	2–1	2–1	0–0	3–1	4–0	0–2	2–1	0–4	3–0	3–0	1–4	1–2	4–0	4–1	2–1	2–0	1–1	0–0
Blackburn Rovers	2–3	0–5	2–0		6–5	3–2	1–3	3–3	3–1	4–2	1–1	1–1	2–2	1–0	4–2	2–1	3–2	3–0	1–1	1–3	4–4	1–0
Blackpool	1–2	6–2	0–1	3–0		1–3	4–0	4–1	2–1	1–1	2–1	2–1	4–1	1–0	3–1	0–4	0–2	0–3	3–4	3–1	2–4	2–2
Bolton Wanderers	0–4	0–1	2–2	4–2	1–0		2–3	1–1	2–4	2–1	5–0	5–0	3–3	2–1	4–3	2–2	4–1	3–3	3–0	0–0	2–2	2–0
Chelsea	1–3	0–1	4–2	2–2	1–0	1–1		1–3	1–0	0–1	6–0	4–1	0–2	3–1	2–1	0–1	4–4	3–0	0–2	1–1	1–2	3–1
Derby County	2–2	0–0	2–2	2–1	1–1	4–1	0–1		2–0	2–3	5–1	3–2	1–1	4–0	2–2	3–2	2–0	3–0	2–0	3–0	2–2	4–4
Everton	1–1	3–3	4–1	6–1	2–0	2–2	3–2	4–2		2–0	0–1	6–3	3–1	2–1	0–0	0–0	1–1	1–0	2–1	6–1	1–2	5–1
Huddersfield Town	0–1	0–0	0–0	0–3	0–1	2–1	2–0	0–0	0–0		2–2	4–1	3–1	1–0	0–1	4–0	2–2	1–0	4–0	2–1	2–1	3–2
Leeds United	0–0	1–1	1–1	3–1	3–1	4–3	2–0	0–2	1–0	1–1		1–1	5–0	2–1	0–1	6–1	0–1	1–3	3–2	2–3	1–1	2–0
Leicester City	1–1	3–0	2–2	1–1	3–0	2–0	1–1	4–0	2–2	3–1	3–1		1–2	1–2	1–1	0–3	2–1	1–1	0–0	4–2	6–2	2–2
Liverpool	2–3	0–0	1–0	2–2	4–3	0–1	3–0	6–1	7–4	2–2	0–1	1–2		1–1	1–3	3–0	4–3	2–2	4–1	3–3	2–0	5–1
Manchester City	2–3	5–2	1–0	2–3	5–1	2–1	1–4	2–1	3–0	3–0	0–0	4–1	1–1		2–3	1–2	3–1	1–0	2–2	2–4	1–0	4–1
Middlesbrough	3–4	0–2	2–2	4–0	2–0	2–1	2–1	0–3	0–2	1–1	0–1	1–1	0–1	2–0		2–3	5–4	2–2	1–1	1–2	3–1	2–1
Newcastle United	2–1	3–1	2–1	2–1	1–2	3–1	2–0	0–0	1–2	0–4	3–1	2–1	4–3	2–0	5–1		1–1	2–0	3–1	0–1	3–0	3–2
Portsmouth	1–3	2–4	1–1	2–0	2–1	2–1	2–0	2–0	2–2	1–0	3–3	2–1	2–1	1–2	2–0	2–0		1–0	3–0	1–3	3–0	2–0
Sheffield United	3–1	1–0	2–1	2–1	1–0	3–2	4–1	4–3	3–2	1–2	0–0	5–2	6–2	2–5	2–0	3–1	2–3		2–3	3–0	1–1	0–0
Sheffield Wednesday	3–2	0–2	1–1	1–1	4–1	2–0	2–2	0–0	3–1	2–1	2–0	4–1	3–0	2–1	2–1	2–0	2–1	3–3		3–1	3–1	2–0
Sunderland	3–2	1–1	1–0	4–2	1–1	7–4	2–1	0–2	3–1	1–2	0–0	2–1	0–0	3–2	0–0	0–2	0–3	2–2	1–2		2–2	0–1
West Bromwich Albion	1–1	3–1	1–0	1–3	2–1	4–0	3–2	2–0	3–1	2–1	0–1	4–3	2–1	4–0	0–1	3–2	4–2	0–1	2–0	5–1		4–1
Wolverhampton Wanderers	1–7	2–4	1–0	5–3	2–3	4–1	1–2	3–1	4–2	6–4	3–3	1–1	3–1	1–2	2–0	1–1	5–2	5–1	3–5	0–2	3–3	

Updated to match(es) played on unknown. Source:
Legend: Blue = home team win; Yellow = draw; Red = away team win.
- The Blackpool v Chelsea match at Bloomfield Road on the 29th of October was played in terrible conditions, with a quagmire pitch and ferocious rain and wind. Only eight Chelsea players started the second half, and they finished the match with only six players.

=== Maps ===
Locations of the Football League First Division London teams
Locations of the Football League First Division teams

== Second Division ==
Second Division
- Season: 1932–33
- Champions: Stoke City
- Promoted: Stoke City; Tottenham Hotspur
- Relegated: Chesterfield; Charlton Athletic
- Matches: 462
- Goals: 1,542 (3.34 per match)
- Top goalscorer: Ted Harper (37 goals)
- Biggest home win: Port Vale 9–1 Chesterfield (24 September 1932)
- Biggest away win: Bradford Park Avenue 0–4 Burnley (3 September 1932); Preston North End 2–6 Tottenham Hotspur (8 October 1932); Oldham Athletic 0–4 Stoke City (31 January 1933); Oldham Athletic 1–5 Tottenham Hotspur (11 February 1933); Bradford City 1–5 Millwall (18 February 1933)
- Highest scoring: Grimsby Town 5–5 Preston North End (15 October 1932); West Ham United 7–3 Charlton Athletic (26 November 1932); Grimsby Town 5–5 Charlton Athletic (7 January 1933)

Pos	Team	Pld	W	D	L	GF	GA	GAv	Pts	Promotion or relegation
1	Stoke City (C, P)	42	25	6	11	78	39	2.000	56	Promotion to the First Division
2	Tottenham Hotspur (P)	42	20	15	7	96	51	1.882	55	Promotion to the First Division
3	Fulham	42	20	10	12	78	65	1.200	50	
4	Bury	42	20	9	13	84	59	1.424	49	
5	Nottingham Forest	42	17	15	10	67	59	1.136	49	
6	Manchester United	42	15	13	14	71	68	1.044	43	
7	Millwall	42	16	11	15	59	57	1.035	43	
8	Bradford (Park Avenue)	42	17	8	17	77	71	1.085	42	
9	Preston North End	42	16	10	16	74	70	1.057	42	
10	Swansea Town	42	19	4	19	50	54	0.926	42	
11	Bradford City	42	14	13	15	65	61	1.066	41	
12	Southampton	42	18	5	19	66	66	1.000	41	
13	Grimsby Town	42	14	13	15	79	84	0.940	41	
14	Plymouth Argyle	42	16	9	17	63	67	0.940	41	
15	Notts County	42	15	10	17	67	78	0.859	40	
16	Oldham Athletic	42	15	8	19	67	80	0.838	38	
17	Port Vale	42	14	10	18	66	79	0.835	38	
18	Lincoln City	42	12	13	17	72	87	0.828	37	
19	Burnley	42	11	14	17	67	79	0.848	36	
20	West Ham United	42	13	9	20	75	93	0.806	35	
21	Chesterfield (R)	42	12	10	20	61	84	0.726	34	Relegation to the Third Division North
22	Charlton Athletic (R)	42	12	7	23	60	91	0.659	31	Relegation to the Third Division South

Rules for classification: 1) Points; 2) Goal average; 3) Goals scored
(C) Champions; (P) Promoted; (R) Relegated

=== Results ===
Home \ Away	BRA	BPA	BUR	BRY	CHA	CHF	FUL	GRI	LIN	MUN	MIL	NOT	NTC	OLD	PLY	PTV	PNE	SOU	STK	SWA	TOT	WHU
Bradford City		1–0	2–1	3–0	3–0	4–2	2–0	2–2	1–1	1–2	1–5	2–2	1–2	3–0	2–3	7–0	0–0	1–0	1–1	1–1	0–1	5–1
Bradford Park Avenue	2–0		0–4	4–0	3–0	5–1	1–4	1–1	6–0	1–1	3–0	3–1	3–4	1–3	1–0	4–2	2–0	2–1	2–2	1–0	3–3	3–0
Burnley	0–0	2–0		1–0	0–1	1–1	3–3	2–0	0–0	2–3	3–0	3–3	2–1	1–1	1–1	1–1	4–0	2–0	1–2	1–2	1–1	4–0
Bury	1–1	0–0	5–3		3–1	6–0	1–1	4–1	2–2	2–2	3–0	5–2	3–1	3–3	2–1	0–0	1–2	1–0	3–2	3–0	1–0	6–1
Charlton Athletic	0–0	0–2	2–2	1–3		2–5	1–2	2–3	4–2	0–1	1–4	3–0	3–3	1–0	4–1	2–1	0–1	2–0	1–0	3–1	0–3	3–1
Chesterfield	1–2	2–1	6–0	1–3	2–3		3–2	1–2	3–0	1–1	1–0	0–1	0–0	3–1	1–1	2–2	4–3	1–0	1–2	1–0	1–1	1–0
Fulham	1–0	5–2	2–1	3–3	3–1	2–2		0–1	3–2	3–1	1–1	0–1	3–4	1–0	3–1	1–1	1–0	4–2	1–3	3–1	2–2	4–2
Grimsby Town	1–1	5–1	1–2	1–0	5–5	1–1	1–0		3–3	1–1	1–1	1–1	1–1	5–1	2–3	6–1	5–5	2–2	0–1	2–1	3–2	2–1
Lincoln City	0–0	2–2	1–4	2–1	1–1	5–3	3–0	6–3		3–2	3–0	1–1	1–1	1–3	2–0	0–1	2–1	1–0	2–3	2–0	2–2	6–0
Manchester United	0–1	2–1	2–1	1–3	1–1	2–1	4–3	1–1	4–1		7–1	2–1	2–0	2–0	4–0	1–1	0–0	1–2	0–2	1–1	2–1	1–2
Millwall	3–3	1–1	4–1	5–2	2–1	0–0	2–1	0–1	2–0	2–0		1–1	1–1	6–1	2–0	0–1	1–1	3–0	0–0	3–1	1–4	1–0
Nottingham Forest	3–1	1–1	1–1	0–2	0–1	2–3	1–0	3–2	2–2	3–2	0–0		3–0	2–3	1–1	1–1	2–1	4–2	1–0	2–2	3–1	2–2
Notts County	2–0	1–4	4–2	2–2	3–2	1–1	1–2	1–3	1–1	1–0	1–0	2–4		2–1	4–1	5–0	0–0	1–2	3–4	1–2	3–0	2–0
Oldham Athletic	6–1	1–3	2–2	2–1	0–0	2–0	1–3	0–1	5–2	1–1	1–0	1–2	5–0		3–1	2–1	0–2	2–0	0–4	0–0	1–5	3–2
Plymouth Argyle	2–1	3–2	4–0	1–0	6–1	1–0	2–3	4–0	0–3	2–3	0–0	1–1	0–2	2–1		3–1	5–0	1–1	1–0	1–0	2–2	4–1
Port Vale	2–0	3–1	1–1	1–0	2–1	9–1	1–2	4–2	3–2	3–3	2–0	0–1	4–0	2–4	4–1		0–1	0–2	1–3	2–1	1–1	4–0
Preston North End	1–4	2–3	6–1	1–3	4–2	2–0	1–2	4–2	5–0	3–3	0–1	2–1	3–0	2–2	3–0	3–1		3–1	1–3	1–0	2–6	4–1
Southampton	3–1	2–0	3–1	1–0	3–0	2–1	2–2	3–0	4–0	4–2	2–3	0–2	6–2	0–2	2–0	2–2	1–0		1–0	2–0	1–1	4–3
Stoke City	4–1	4–0	3–0	2–3	2–0	2–1	0–1	2–0	5–2	0–0	1–2	0–1	0–2	4–0	2–0	1–0	1–1	3–1		2–0	2–0	0–0
Swansea Town	2–0	3–1	2–0	2–1	2–0	3–0	3–0	1–0	3–1	2–1	1–0	0–1	2–0	2–0	0–1	2–0	3–1	2–1	0–2		0–2	1–0
Tottenham Hotspur	1–1	2–0	4–1	2–1	4–1	4–1	0–0	4–3	3–2	6–1	2–1	0–0	3–1	1–1	0–0	4–0	1–1	5–0	3–2	7–0		2–2
West Ham United	2–4	2–1	4–4	0–1	7–3	3–1	1–1	5–2	0–0	3–1	3–0	4–3	1–1	5–2	2–2	5–0	1–1	3–1	1–2	3–1	1–0	

Updated to match(es) played on unknown. Source: Ian Laschke: Rothmans Book of Football League Records 1888–89 to 1978–79. Macdonald and Jane’s, London & Sydney, 1980.
Legend: Blue = home team win; Yellow = draw; Red = away team win.

=== Maps ===
Locations of the Football League Second Division London teams
Locations of the Football League Second Division teams

== Third Division North ==
Football League Third Division North
- Season: 1932–33
- Champions: Hull City (1st title)
- Failed re-election: None
- Matches: 462
- Goals: 1,691 (3.66 per match)
- Top goalscorer: Bill McNaughton (Hull City), 39

Pos	Team	Pld	W	D	L	GF	GA	GAv	Pts	Promotion
1	Hull City (C, P)	42	26	7	9	100	45	2.222	59	Promotion to the Second Division
2	Wrexham	42	24	9	9	106	51	2.078	57	
3	Stockport County	42	21	12	9	99	58	1.707	54	
4	Chester	42	22	8	12	94	66	1.424	52	
5	Walsall	42	19	10	13	75	58	1.293	48	
6	Doncaster Rovers	42	17	14	11	77	79	0.975	48	
7	Gateshead	42	19	9	14	78	67	1.164	47	
8	Barnsley	42	19	8	15	92	80	1.150	46	
9	Barrow	42	18	7	17	60	60	1.000	43	
10	Crewe Alexandra	42	20	3	19	80	84	0.952	43	
11	Tranmere Rovers	42	17	8	17	70	66	1.061	42	
12	Southport	42	17	7	18	70	67	1.045	41	
13	Accrington Stanley	42	15	10	17	78	76	1.026	40	
14	Hartlepools United	42	16	7	19	87	116	0.750	39	
15	Halifax Town	42	15	8	19	71	90	0.789	38	
16	Mansfield Town	42	14	7	21	84	100	0.840	35	
17	Rotherham United	42	14	6	22	60	84	0.714	34	
18	Rochdale	42	13	7	22	58	80	0.725	33	
19	Carlisle United	42	13	7	22	51	75	0.680	33	
20	York City	42	13	6	23	72	92	0.783	32	
21	New Brighton	42	11	10	21	63	88	0.716	32	Re-elected
22	Darlington	42	10	8	24	66	109	0.606	28	Re-elected

Source: rsssf.com
(C) Champions; (P) Promoted

=== Results ===
Home \ Away	ACC	BAR	BRW	CRL	CHE	CRE	DAR	DON	GAT	HAL	HAR	HUL	MAN	NWB	ROC	ROT	SOU	STP	TRA	WAL	WRE	YOR
Accrington Stanley		2–0	0–0	3–1	1–4	2–0	2–0	1–1	0–3	4–1	7–1	1–2	6–0	5–4	0–3	5–1	1–1	1–1	3–0	1–3	5–3	5–0
Barnsley	4–0		3–0	4–1	0–3	7–1	6–2	2–3	2–4	1–1	3–2	1–0	6–2	1–2	3–1	3–1	2–0	2–2	2–1	2–1	5–3	1–1
Barrow	5–0	2–3		2–1	2–3	3–0	4–0	3–0	1–2	3–3	3–1	0–2	1–0	2–1	1–1	2–1	2–0	0–3	2–0	1–2	1–1	1–0
Carlisle United	2–2	0–1	0–1		1–1	2–0	3–0	0–2	1–2	5–3	3–1	1–1	3–1	1–3	2–2	0–0	0–0	2–1	0–1	1–1	2–1	5–1
Chester	4–2	3–1	2–1	4–0		3–1	5–2	2–0	3–1	6–3	3–3	1–1	5–2	3–0	2–0	1–0	1–1	2–2	1–2	1–0	0–3	5–0
Crewe Alexandra	3–1	2–2	2–0	1–0	0–1		2–4	4–0	2–0	2–1	6–2	1–1	7–0	4–0	3–1	8–0	1–1	2–1	2–0	2–1	2–0	1–0
Darlington	2–2	1–1	1–2	5–2	1–1	3–4		2–2	1–3	2–1	1–2	3–2	1–3	2–1	5–1	4–1	1–0	1–1	1–0	1–1	1–2	3–0
Doncaster Rovers	2–2	3–1	1–1	4–2	3–3	5–1	3–1		3–1	5–1	4–1	1–1	2–2	2–0	1–0	1–0	2–1	1–1	2–2	3–2	1–1	3–2
Gateshead	1–0	1–1	2–3	1–0	3–0	2–1	3–0	4–0		3–0	3–1	2–3	3–2	2–0	3–0	1–1	4–1	0–3	0–2	1–1	4–4	2–2
Halifax Town	0–0	2–1	2–0	0–1	0–2	1–5	4–2	0–0	1–0		4–0	1–3	5–1	3–3	2–0	2–1	1–0	1–3	4–1	4–0	0–0	2–0
Hartlepool	3–1	6–4	0–1	2–1	3–1	3–2	2–1	4–0	2–2	1–1		0–1	6–3	3–2	3–0	2–0	4–2	1–1	2–3	2–0	3–1	4–2
Hull City	4–2	5–1	3–0	6–1	2–0	3–0	3–1	6–1	1–1	3–1	3–0		4–1	5–0	1–1	4–2	4–0	3–0	3–0	0–0	4–1	2–1
Mansfield Town	1–3	0–1	2–1	3–1	1–0	4–0	3–3	2–2	1–2	2–2	7–1	2–1		5–0	4–1	9–2	4–0	1–2	2–0	2–0	0–0	2–0
New Brighton	2–2	3–5	1–2	2–0	3–1	1–2	7–1	4–4	1–1	0–3	5–2	1–0	1–0		0–3	5–2	2–1	1–1	1–1	2–2	0–2	0–1
Rochdale	2–0	2–3	0–0	0–1	2–0	1–4	1–1	2–3	1–0	1–0	6–2	3–2	2–1	1–0		2–2	1–3	0–2	0–3	1–1	3–1	1–4
Rotherham United	2–3	0–0	1–0	1–0	0–5	5–0	3–1	1–1	1–2	6–1	1–1	3–2	3–0	1–0	2–0		3–1	2–1	2–0	4–1	0–2	1–0
Southport	2–3	2–0	3–0	4–0	2–1	4–1	5–1	1–0	4–1	1–2	6–3	0–1	5–2	1–1	2–0	2–0		2–1	1–1	2–1	0–0	5–1
Stockport County	2–0	5–4	4–1	0–1	8–5	1–0	5–1	5–1	4–3	6–0	6–2	3–5	2–2	1–1	2–3	1–0	3–1		3–0	5–0	1–0	2–0
Tranmere	4–0	3–0	1–3	1–2	2–2	5–0	3–1	3–2	4–2	2–3	3–3	2–0	3–0	2–3	3–1	1–0	2–1	2–2		1–3	0–0	2–3
Walsall	1–0	1–1	1–1	5–0	3–1	2–1	4–0	2–0	2–0	4–0	4–1	1–0	8–1	0–0	2–1	1–0	3–1	0–0	3–2		2–3	4–2
Wrexham	1–0	3–0	4–1	2–1	1–2	7–0	3–1	3–0	5–1	5–2	8–1	3–1	1–1	5–0	4–1	5–1	6–0	2–0	1–1	3–0		3–1
York City	0–0	3–2	3–1	0–1	3–1	4–0	6–1	2–3	2–2	5–3	1–1	1–2	4–3	3–0	2–6	4–3	0–1	2–2	0–1	4–2	2–3	

Updated to match(es) played on unknown. Source: Ian Laschke: Rothmans Book of Football League Records 1888–89 to 1978–79. Macdonald and Jane’s, London & Sydney, 1980.
Legend: Blue = home team win; Yellow = draw; Red = away team win.

=== Maps ===
Locations of the Football League Third Division North teams

== Third Division South ==
Football League Third Division South
- Season: 1932–33
- Champions: Brentford (1st title)
- Failed re-election: None
- Matches: 462
- Goals: 1,634 (3.54 per match)
- Top goalscorer: Clarrie Bourton (Coventry City), 40

Pos	Team	Pld	W	D	L	GF	GA	GAv	Pts	Promotion
1	Brentford (C, P)	42	26	10	6	90	49	1.837	62	Promotion to the Second Division
2	Exeter City	42	24	10	8	88	48	1.833	58	
3	Norwich City	42	22	13	7	88	55	1.600	57	
4	Reading	42	19	13	10	103	71	1.451	51	
5	Crystal Palace	42	19	8	15	78	64	1.219	46	
6	Coventry City	42	19	6	17	106	77	1.377	44	
7	Gillingham	42	18	8	16	72	61	1.180	44	
8	Northampton Town	42	18	8	16	76	66	1.152	44	
9	Bristol Rovers	42	15	14	13	61	56	1.089	44	
10	Torquay United	42	16	12	14	72	67	1.075	44	
11	Watford	42	16	12	14	66	63	1.048	44	
12	Brighton & Hove Albion	42	17	8	17	66	65	1.015	42	
13	Southend United	42	15	11	16	65	82	0.793	41	
14	Luton Town	42	13	13	16	78	78	1.000	39	
15	Bristol City	42	12	13	17	83	90	0.922	37	
16	Queens Park Rangers	42	13	11	18	72	87	0.828	37	
17	Aldershot	42	13	10	19	61	72	0.847	36	
18	Bournemouth & Boscombe Athletic	42	12	12	18	60	81	0.741	36	
19	Cardiff City	42	12	7	23	69	99	0.697	31	
20	Clapton Orient	42	8	13	21	59	93	0.634	29	
21	Newport County	42	11	7	24	61	105	0.581	29	Re-elected
22	Swindon Town	42	9	11	22	60	105	0.571	29	Re-elected

(C) Champions; (P) Promoted

=== Results ===
Home \ Away	ALD	B&BA	BRE	B&HA	BRI	BRR	CAR	CLA	COV	CRY	EXE	GIL	LUT	NPC	NOR	NWC	QPR	REA	STD	SWI	TOR	WAT
Aldershot		1–1	1–1	1–1	1–0	1–0	1–0	4–0	1–1	3–1	4–1	3–0	2–2	2–1	0–1	1–3	2–0	4–4	1–2	0–1	2–0	2–1
Bournemouth & Boscombe Athletic	1–0		1–1	1–1	6–1	2–2	3–2	4–2	3–1	3–2	1–1	1–0	0–2	1–2	1–1	1–1	3–0	0–3	4–0	5–1	1–2	2–2
Brentford	2–0	1–1		2–1	2–1	0–0	7–3	4–2	2–1	2–0	0–2	1–2	1–0	6–0	1–0	2–2	2–0	1–1	3–1	1–0	3–1	2–1
Brighton & Hove Albion	0–2	3–0	1–2		7–0	0–3	1–0	0–0	1–0	1–2	2–1	1–0	2–0	1–0	2–1	1–1	4–1	5–3	1–2	5–1	1–1	3–0
Bristol City	2–2	1–1	1–2	3–4		3–1	3–1	3–0	5–3	3–3	0–1	1–1	5–2	3–2	5–4	1–1	2–3	4–1	5–1	5–1	2–0	2–3
Bristol Rovers	4–1	1–0	2–4	5–3	1–1		0–0	2–0	1–0	2–3	1–0	1–0	0–0	2–2	4–3	1–1	4–1	1–0	3–1	1–0	0–2	2–0
Cardiff City	2–1	3–0	2–1	1–2	1–1	4–3		6–1	2–2	1–1	1–3	1–0	3–2	1–3	6–0	4–2	2–5	0–1	2–0	3–0	2–1	1–1
Clapton Orient	2–3	1–1	1–5	2–0	2–2	0–3	3–0		2–1	4–1	2–2	1–2	0–0	3–1	2–2	0–0	2–2	2–5	0–0	7–1	1–4	2–0
Coventry City	3–0	3–0	2–3	2–2	6–0	2–0	5–0	5–0		6–2	4–0	4–2	4–0	3–1	3–1	3–5	7–0	3–1	2–3	2–1	5–0	1–3
Crystal Palace	3–0	3–0	2–1	5–0	2–2	2–0	4–1	2–1	1–3		2–2	5–1	3–0	0–0	2–0	4–0	0–1	1–1	4–1	4–3	2–1	0–3
Exeter City	0–0	2–3	1–2	4–1	2–0	1–0	1–0	3–0	5–0	1–1		2–1	2–0	4–0	3–1	2–1	2–0	4–1	3–0	5–0	5–0	5–2
Gillingham	5–2	4–0	1–3	2–0	4–2	2–0	1–1	3–1	3–0	2–0	1–2		1–1	2–0	5–1	0–2	4–1	4–1	3–2	3–1	1–1	3–3
Luton Town	2–1	1–2	5–5	0–0	5–4	1–1	8–1	4–1	4–1	1–1	4–0	2–1		2–2	2–1	1–1	3–1	1–1	3–3	6–2	2–1	3–2
Newport County	2–1	1–1	1–6	5–2	1–1	3–1	4–2	0–2	2–1	1–3	1–1	0–2	3–2		0–3	3–4	5–1	3–3	1–3	1–2	3–1	2–0
Northampton Town	5–2	6–0	1–0	0–0	2–1	1–1	2–0	3–0	5–1	1–0	5–3	1–0	1–0	8–0		2–2	2–1	1–0	0–0	6–0	2–0	0–0
Norwich City	3–2	6–0	3–0	1–0	3–0	1–1	3–1	2–0	2–1	3–0	0–0	2–0	2–1	3–1	2–0		3–2	2–2	1–0	5–2	1–2	1–2
Queens Park Rangers	2–2	3–1	2–3	0–1	1–1	1–1	5–1	2–1	3–3	2–1	1–3	1–1	3–1	6–1	1–1	2–2		0–3	6–1	4–2	1–1	2–1
Reading	2–2	6–2	1–3	3–0	2–2	3–1	4–2	3–1	3–3	2–3	2–2	4–0	4–1	4–1	4–0	3–2	3–1		1–1	7–1	5–2	2–0
Southend	5–1	2–1	0–1	2–1	3–1	2–2	2–2	3–3	1–3	1–2	1–2	2–2	2–1	3–0	1–0	2–1	0–1	3–1		0–0	2–1	2–1
Swindon Town	3–2	2–0	0–0	5–1	1–4	1–1	6–2	3–3	1–2	1–0	2–2	1–1	1–1	2–0	2–1	2–4	0–0	0–1	2–2		0–0	1–2
Torquay United	1–0	2–1	1–1	1–0	0–0	1–1	4–1	1–1	3–3	2–1	1–3	1–2	3–1	4–0	5–1	2–2	3–1	1–1	8–1	4–3		3–2
Watford	2–0	2–1	1–1	0–4	1–0	3–1	2–1	1–1	3–1	1–0	0–0	2–0	4–1	3–2	4–0	1–2	2–2	1–1	2–2	2–2	0–0	

Updated to match(es) played on unknown. Source: Ian Laschke: Rothmans Book of Football League Records 1888–89 to 1978–79. Macdonald and Jane’s, London & Sydney, 1980.
Legend: Blue = home team win; Yellow = draw; Red = away team win.

=== Maps ===
Locations of the Football League Third Division South London teams
Locations of the Football League Third Division South teams

== Attendances ==
=== Division One ===
No.	Club	Average
1	Arsenal FC	41,958
2	Aston Villa FC	32,249
3	Chelsea FC	31,485
4	Wolverhampton Wanderers FC	27,104
5	Everton FC	26,412
6	Newcastle United FC	25,992
7	Manchester City FC	24,254
8	Liverpool FC	23,382
9	West Bromwich Albion FC	22,792
10	Portsmouth FC	18,102
11	Sunderland AFC	17,254
12	Leeds United FC	17,114
13	Birmingham City FC	16,894
14	Leicester City FC	16,822
15	Sheffield Wednesday FC	16,704
16	Blackpool FC	16,324
17	Derby County FC	15,047
18	Sheffield United FC	14,296
19	Bolton Wanderers FC	13,203
20	Blackburn Rovers FC	12,944
21	Middlesbrough FC	12,157
22	Huddersfield Town AFC	11,965

=== Division Two ===
No.	Club	Average
1	Tottenham Hotspur FC	33,205
2	Fulham FC	20,813
3	Manchester United	20,149
4	Plymouth Argyle FC	17,465
5	West Ham United FC	16,244
6	Stoke City FC	15,858
7	Bradford City AFC	14,622
8	Millwall FC	13,807
9	Charlton Athletic FC	12,938
10	Notts County FC	11,015
11	Bradford Park Avenue AFC	10,553
12	Preston North End FC	10,221
13	Nottingham Forest FC	10,184
14	Lincoln City FC	9,758
15	Swansea City AFC	9,566
16	Chesterfield FC	9,480
17	Bury FC	9,406
18	Burnley FC	9,401
19	Southampton FC	9,064
20	Port Vale FC	8,876
21	Grimsby Town FC	8,357
22	Oldham Athletic FC	8,254

=== Division Three ===
No.	Club	Average
1	Brentford FC	13,300
2	Coventry City FC	12,479
3	Norwich City FC	10,930
4	Crystal Palace FC	10,877
5	Hull City AFC	10,097
6	Bristol Rovers FC	9,984
7	Reading FC	9,840
8	Bristol City FC	8,636
9	Chester City FC	8,136
10	Queens Park Rangers FC	7,707
11	Exeter City FC	7,665
12	Wrexham AFC	7,410
13	Watford FC	7,297
14	Cardiff City FC	7,008
15	Gillingham FC	6,597
16	Brighton & Hove Albion FC	6,361
17	Southend United FC	6,083
18	Leyton Orient FC	6,064
19	Northampton Town FC	6,056
20	Luton Town FC	5,824
21	Mansfield Town FC	5,522
22	Walsall FC	5,279
23	Doncaster Rovers FC	5,262
24	Stockport County FC	5,210
25	Carlisle United FC	5,210
26	Aldershot Town FC	5,140
27	Barnsley FC	5,115
28	Halifax Town AFC	4,954
29	Crewe Alexandra FC	4,920
30	Swindon Town FC	4,905
31	AFC Bournemouth	4,822
32	Rochdale AFC	4,669
33	Newport County AFC	4,401
34	Gateshead AFC	4,382
35	York City FC	4,348
36	Tranmere Rovers	4,200
37	Southport FC	4,115
38	Torquay United FC	3,991
39	Rotherham United FC	3,931
40	Barrow AFC	3,835
41	Hartlepool United FC	3,740
42	New Brighton AFC	3,267
43	Accrington Stanley FC	2,933
44	Darlington FC	2,520

== See also ==
- 1932–33 in English football
- 1932 in association football
- 1933 in association football
