= Governor Evans =

Governor Evans may refer to:

- Daniel J. Evans (1925–2024), 16th Governor of Washington
- John Gary Evans (1863–1942), 85th Governor of South Carolina
- John Evans (Pennsylvania governor) (1678–?), Colonial Governor of Pennsylvania from 1704 to 1709
- John Evans (Idaho governor) (1925–2014), 27th Governor of Idaho
- John Evans (Colorado governor) (1814–1897), 2nd Governor of the Territory of Colorado
- Melvin H. Evans (1917–1984), Governor of the United States Virgin Islands
- Waldo A. Evans (1869–1936), military Governor of the United States Virgin Islands and American Samoa
