= Jonathan Evans =

Jonathan Evans may refer to:

- Jonathan Evans (American football) (born 1981), fullback
- Jonathan Evans (politician) (born 1950), British lawyer and Conservative Party Member of Parliament
- Jonathan Evans (rugby union) (born 1992), Welsh rugby union player
- Jonathan Evans, Baron Evans of Weardale (born 1958), Director General of the British Security Service, from 2007 to 2013
- Jonathan St B. T. Evans (born 1948), British cognitive psychologist
- Jonathan Evans (scholar) (born c. 1955), American professor of medieval languages and literature, Tolkien scholar

== See also ==
- John Evans (disambiguation)
