= David Evans (microbiologist) =

British microbiologist

Sir David Gwynne Evans FRS (6 September 1909 – 13 June 1984) was a British microbiologist; his work included testing vaccines for whooping cough, and he also chaired several Medical Research Committees looking at vaccines for TB, measles and rubella.

== Early life ==
He was born in Atherton, Lancashire to Welsh parents. His father was a headmaster and his mother a schoolteacher. They had four children and his elder brother, Meredith, was a professor at Leeds and Manchester Universities and also a Fellow of the Royal Society, while his younger brother, A. G. Evans became professor of chemistry at University College, Cardiff.

Evans left grammar school in 1928 and spent two years with the British Cotton Growers' Association. He and Alwyn then studied at the University of Manchester from 1930 to 1933, and David graduated with a degree in physics and chemistry. He gained his Master of Science in 1934 and finished his Ph.D. in 1938.

== Career ==
In 1940 he began working at the National Institute for Medical Research (NIMR) in London.

In 1947, he became a reader in the bacteriology department at the University of Manchester, but returned to the NIMR in 1955 as director of the biological standards department. In 1961 he became professor of bacteriology and immunology at the London School of Hygiene & Tropical Medicine.

In 1971–72, Evans was director of the Lister Institute of Preventive Medicine and struggled in vain to save its Chelsea laboratory from financial failure. He left in 1972 to become director of the National Institute for Biological Standards and Control to prepare for its 1976 move to South Mimms.

In 1976 he taught medical students at Oxford University in the Sir William Dunn School of Pathology until retirement to North Wales in 1979.

He was elected a Fellow of the Royal Society in 1960 and awarded their Buchanan Medal in 1977 for his leading role in the standardization and safety control of vaccines.

He was awarded CBE in 1969 and knighted in 1977. He retired in 1979.

He died at Rhos-on-Sea (Llandrillo-yn-Rhos), Denbighshire, North Wales.

== Personal life ==
In 1937, he married Mary (née Darby); they had one son, John Gwynne Evans and one daughter.
