= Tom Redding =

English footballer (1932–1980)

Personal information
- Full name: Thomas Richard Redding
- Date of birth: 17 March 1932
- Place of birth: Grimsby, England
- Date of death: 23 July 1980 (aged 48)
- Place of death: Grimsby, England
- Position: Defender

Senior career*
Years	Team	Apps	(Gls)
1953–1954	Brigg Town		
1954–1957	Grimsby Town	4	(0)
1957–19??	Scarborough		
- * Club domestic league appearances and goals

Thomas Richard Redding (17 March 1932 – 23 July 1980) was an English professional footballer who played as a defender in the Football League for Grimsby Town.

Redding was employed as a warehouse foreman by Humberside Sea and Land Services and died following an industrial accident when supervising the loading of steel girders at the company's site on the Central Electricity Generating Board's land at South Killingholme.
