= Mohrman-Jack-Evans House =

Historic house in Ohio, United States

- U.S. National Register of Historic Places
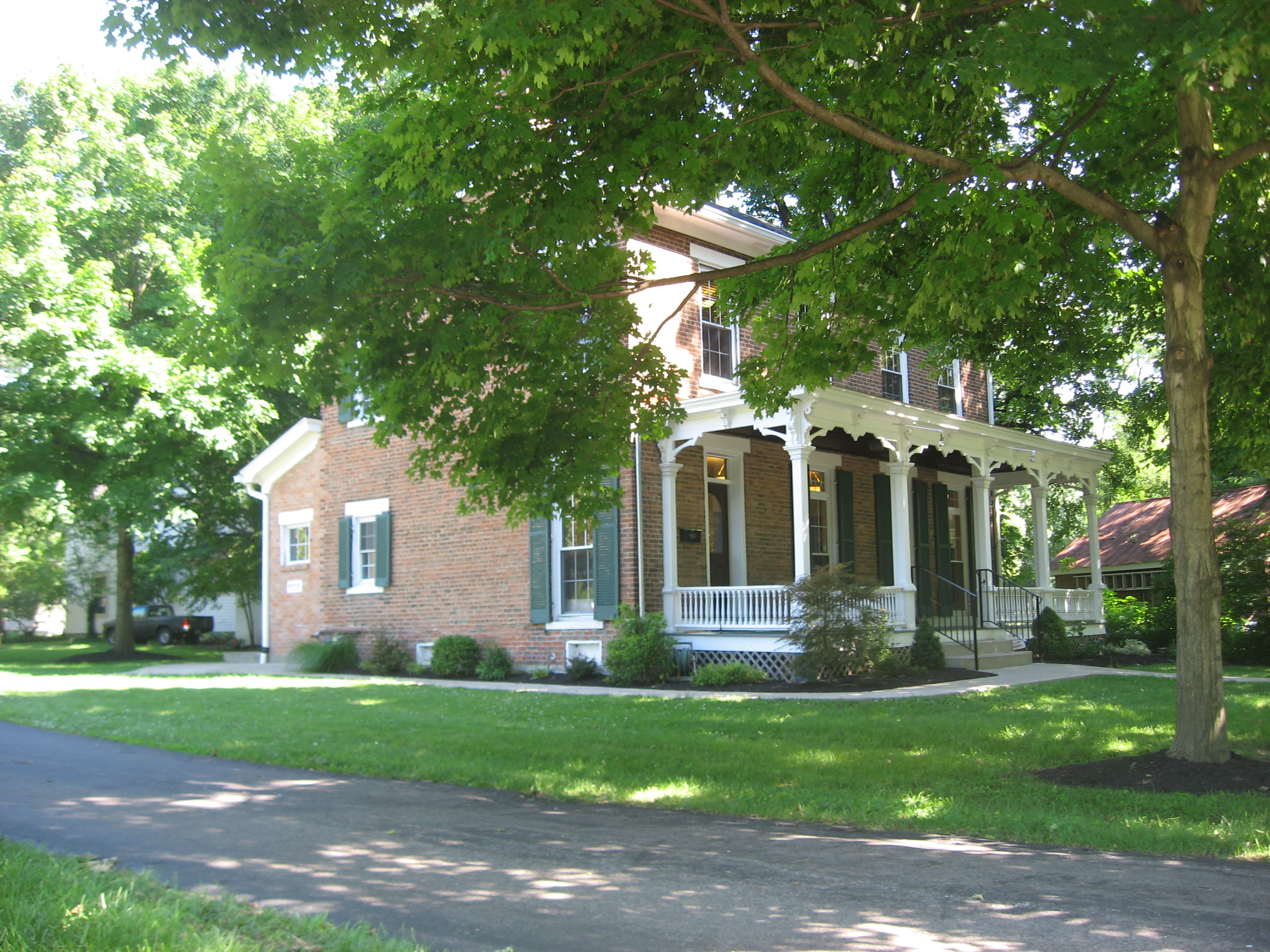

- Location within Ohio Location within the United States
- Location: 342 Columbus Ave., Lebanon, Ohio
- Coordinates: 39°26′16″N 84°11′56″W
- Area: 0.6 acres (0.24 ha)
- Built: 1850
- Architectural style: Greek Revival, Italianate
- MPS: Lebanon MRA
- NRHP reference No.: 84000433
- Added to NRHP: October 10, 1984

The Mohrman-Jack-Evans House is an historic building located at 342 Columbus Avenue in Lebanon, Ohio, United States. Built in 1850 in the Greek Revival and Italianate styles of architecture, it was originally a single-family house. On October 10, 1984, when it was added to the National Register of Historic Places, it was serving as the meeting place of First Church of Christ, Scientist. Today, it is the office of an insurance agency. First Church of Christ, Scientist, Lebanon is now Christian Science Society and meets at 109 West Mulberry Street in Lebanon.
