= Green-Evans House =

Historic house in Tennessee, United States

- Green--Evans House
- U.S. National Register of Historic Places
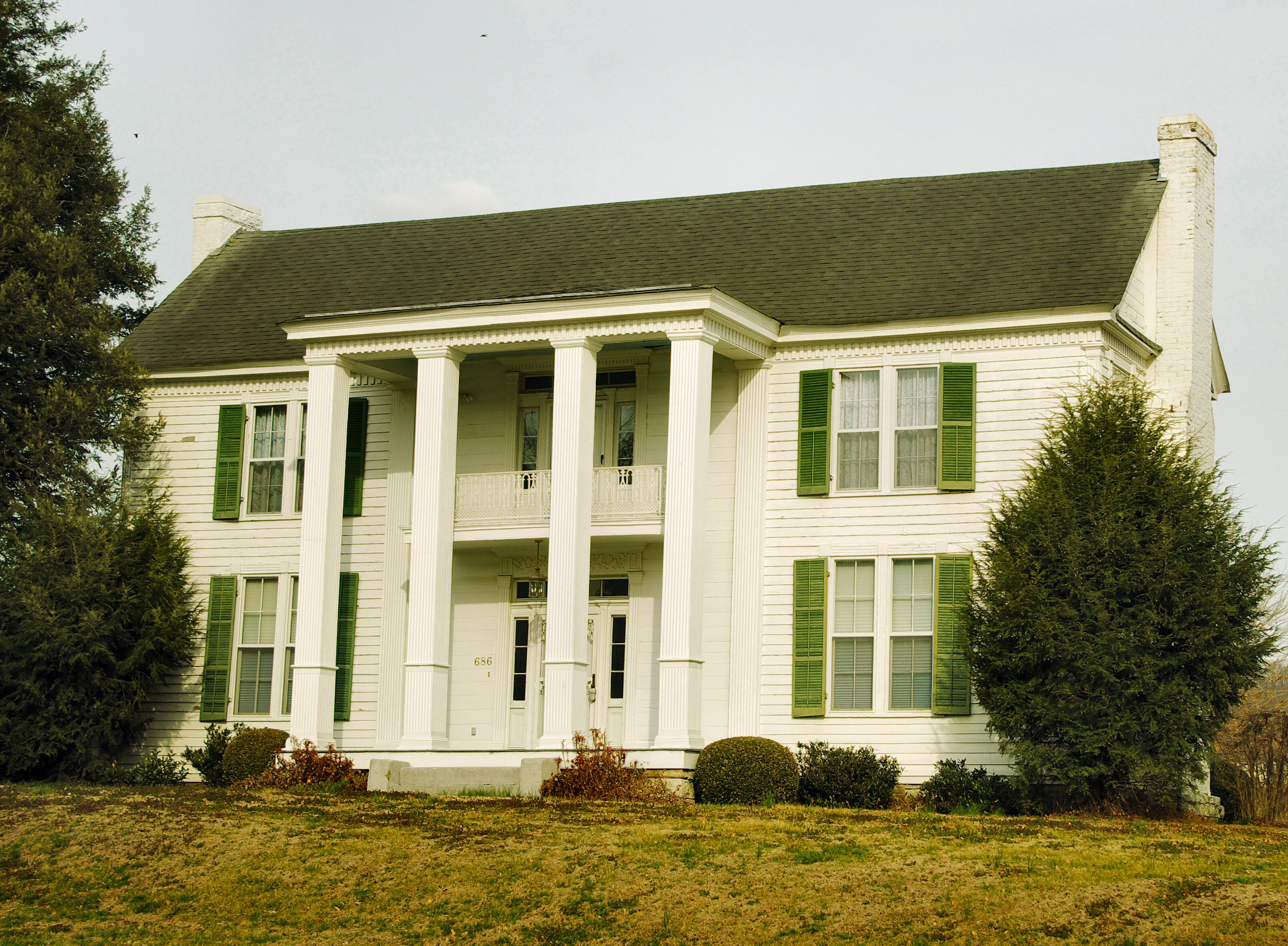
- The Green-Evans House in 2014

- Location within Tennessee Location within the United States
- Nearest city: Lynchburg, Tennessee
- Coordinates: 35°18′9″N 86°21′54″W
- Area: 3 acres (1.2 ha)
- Built: 1858
- Built by: Townsend Port Green
- Architectural style: Greek Revival
- NRHP reference No.: 92001713
- Added to NRHP: December 17, 1992

The Green-Evans House is a historic mansion in Lynchburg, Tennessee, U.S..

== History ==
The house was built in 1858 on a plantation for Townsend Port Green, who lived here with his wife Mary Ann Landiss and their 14 children. During the American Civil War of 1861–1865, two of his sons joined the Confederate States Army and served under General Nathan Bedford Forrest. By 1885, the house was purchased by Daniel S. Evans, a saloon keeper.

== Architectural significance ==
The house was designed in the Greek Revival architectural style. It has been listed on the National Register of Historic Places since December 17, 1992.
