= John Gwynne Evans =

British environmental archaeologist

John Gwynne Evans (11 November 1941 – 14 June 2005) was a British environmental archaeologist and specialist on land snails.

== Early life ==
John Gwynne Evans was born in St Albans, Hertfordshire. His father was Sir David Evans, a microbiologist who later became the director of the London School of Hygiene and Tropical Medicine. He was educated at University College School in Hampstead, and then at Reading University, where he graduated with a BSc in zoology in 1963.

== Academic career ==
While at Reading University he met John Wymer, then the curator of Reading Museum. This inspired him to study zoological applications to archaeology, and he also got involved in the university's excavations at Silchester. He went to London University's Institute of Archaeology to undertake a PhD on mega palaeo-fauna with Professor Frederick Zeuner as his supervisor. Unfortunately, Zuener died suddenly, and he worked on sub-fossil land snails instead, supervised by Michael Kerney of Imperial College. Here he gained the nickname ‘Snails’ Evans. His thesis on ‘The stratification of Mollusca in chalk soils and their relation to archaeology” was completed in 1967.

In 1970 he was appointed lecturer in environmental archaeology at University College Cardiff. This was the first lectureship devoted to environmental archaeology in the UK outside of London. He spent his entire academic career at Cardiff, becoming Reader in 1982 and Professor in 1994. He retired in 2002. He was regarded as an inspirational lecturer during his time at Cardiff.

Land snails are sensitive to their environment and assemblages of snails from excavations could be used to show what past environments were like. Evans was the first to use evidence from multiple archaeological excavations to reconstruct the past environment, especially in the Neolithic period. He concentrated his work on two main areas: the chalk landscape of southern England and the wind-blown sands of the Scottish islands. His major publications were ‘Land Snails In Archaeology’ in 1972 and ‘The Environment Of Early Man In The British Isles’ in 1975. The first shows in detail the methodologies he developed, and which have since been applied routinely to other archaeological sites. The second book was the first to use archaeological evidence to show the environmental history of the British Isles. He also published ‘An Introduction to Environmental Archaeology’ in 1978.

He was assistant editor and then editor of the Proceedings of the Prehistoric Society between 1975 and 1994.

In the 1980s and 1990s he concentrated on publishing reports of fieldwork but as he approached retirement he became interested in archaeological theory and produced synthetic works on environmental archaeology including ‘Land And Archaeology’ in 1999 and ‘Environmental Archaeology And The Social Order’ in 2003.

== Personal life ==
As an undergraduate he was a keen chorister, rower and music lover. He donated his extensive snail collection to the National Museum of Wales.

== Select Bibliography ==
Evans, John G. (1972). Land snails in archaeology: with special reference to the British Isles. Studies in archaeological science. London and New York: Seminar Press. ISBN 978-0-12-829550-2.

Evans, John G. (1975). The environment of early man in the British Isles. Berkeley: University of California Press. ISBN 978-0-520-02973-6.

Evans, John G. (1978). An introduction to environmental archaeology. London: Elek. ISBN 978-0-236-40110-9.

Evans, John G.; O'Connor, Terence P. (1999). Environmental archaeology: principles and methods. Stroud: Sutton. ISBN 978-0-7509-1778-0.

Evans, John G. (1999). Land and archaeology: histories of human environment in the British Isles. Stroud, Gloucs.: Tempus. ISBN 978-0-7524-1463-8.

Environmental archaeology and the social order. John G. Evans (ed.). London New York: Routledge. 2003. ISBN 978-0-415-30404-7.
