= John Evans (rugby union, born 1926) =

- Full name: John Davies Evans
- Born: 30 June 1926 Mountain Ash, Wales
- Died: 25 March 1989 (aged 62) Velindre, Wales

Rugby union career
- Position: Prop
International career
Years	Team	Apps	(Points)
1958	Wales	2	(0)

John Davies Evans (30 June 1926 — 25 March 1989) was a Welsh international rugby union player.

A colliery worker from Mountain Ash, Evans was a prop with Cardiff, capped twice for Wales in the 1958 Five Nations, playing their final two fixtures against Ireland at Lansdowne Road and France at Cardiff Arms Park. He was also a member of the invitational Barbarians side for a 1958 match against the East Midlands.

Evans later worked as a sales manager for Scottish & Newcastle breweries.

== See also ==
- List of Wales national rugby union players
