= John Morton Evans =

British philatelist

Dr. John Morton Evans (28 Jul 1871, Chirbury, Shropshire – 28 Sep 1956, Bristol) was a British philatelist who signed the Roll of Distinguished Philatelists in 1935. In 1953, Morton Evans was awarded the Tilleard Medal by the Royal Philatelic Society London for his display of the stamps of British Guiana. He was the President of the Bristol and Clifton Philatelic Society which he had joined in 1898.
