= William Pringle (footballer) =

English footballer

Personal information
- Full name: William Alexander Pringle
- Date of birth: 24 February 1932
- Place of birth: Liverpool, England
- Date of death: October 2006 (aged 74)
- Place of death: Chester, England
- Position: Inside forward

Senior career*
Years	Team	Apps	(Gls)
1949–1954	Leeds United	0	(0)
1954	Grimsby Town	2	(0)
1954–195?	Rhyl		
- * Club domestic league appearances and goals

William Alexander Pringle (24 February 1932 – October 2006) was an English professional footballer who played as an inside forward.
