= Laurie Bolton =

English footballer (1932–2018)

Personal information
- Full name: Lyall Bolton
- Date of birth: 11 July 1932
- Place of birth: Gateshead, England
- Date of death: 8 August 2018 (aged 86)
- Place of death: Windy Nook, Tyne and Wear, England
- Position: Wing half

Youth career
- 1948–1949: Windy Nook Juniors
- 1949–1950: Reyrolles

Senior career*
Years	Team	Apps	(Gls)
1950–1957	Sunderland	3	(0)
1957–19??	Chelmsford City		
- * Club domestic league appearances and goals

Lyall "Laurie" Bolton (11 July 1932 – 8 August 2018) was an English professional footballer who played as a wing half for Sunderland.
