= Guy Schmidt =

Luxembourgish footballer (1932–2015)

Personal information
- Date of birth: 12 April 1932
- Place of birth: Esch-sur-Alzette, Luxembourg
- Date of death: 27 March 2015 (aged 82)
- Place of death: Schouweiler, Luxembourg

International career
Years	Team	Apps	(Gls)
1952–1957	Luxembourg	14	(0)

Guy Schmidt (12 April 1932 – 27 March 2015) was a Luxembourgish footballer. He played in 14 matches for the Luxembourg national football team from 1952 to 1957. Schmidt died on 27 March 2015, at the age of 82.
