= John Morgan Evans =

American dramatist

John Morgan Evans (September 26, 1942 – December 27, 1991) was an American actor, playwright, and casting director.

== Career ==
His play, Daughters, about five female members of a New York Italian-American family, was staged off-Broadway in 1986. Bette Henritze, Miriam Phillips, Marcia Rodd, Mary Testa, and Marisa Tomei comprised the cast.

Evans appeared on such television programs as The Rockford Files, The Betty White Show, Adam-12, Starsky and Hutch, Barnaby Jones, Barney Miller, and The Rookies. His best-known feature film was Sheila Levine Is Dead and Living in New York.

== Death ==
John Morgan Evans died on December 27, 1991, aged 49, following a long illness.
