= John Evans (Australian footballer, born 1950) =

Australian rules footballer

Personal information
- Full name: John Evans
- Born: 10 September 1950
- Original team: East Sandringham
- Height: 191 cm (6 ft 3 in)
- Weight: 89 kg (196 lb)

Playing career^{1}
Years	Club	Games (Goals)
1969–70	St Kilda	14 (10)
- ^{1} Playing statistics correct to the end of 1970.

John Evans (born 10 September 1950) is a former Australian rules footballer who played with St Kilda in the Victorian Football League (VFL).
