= Jonathan H. Evans House =

Historic house in Wisconsin, United States

- U.S. National Register of Historic Places
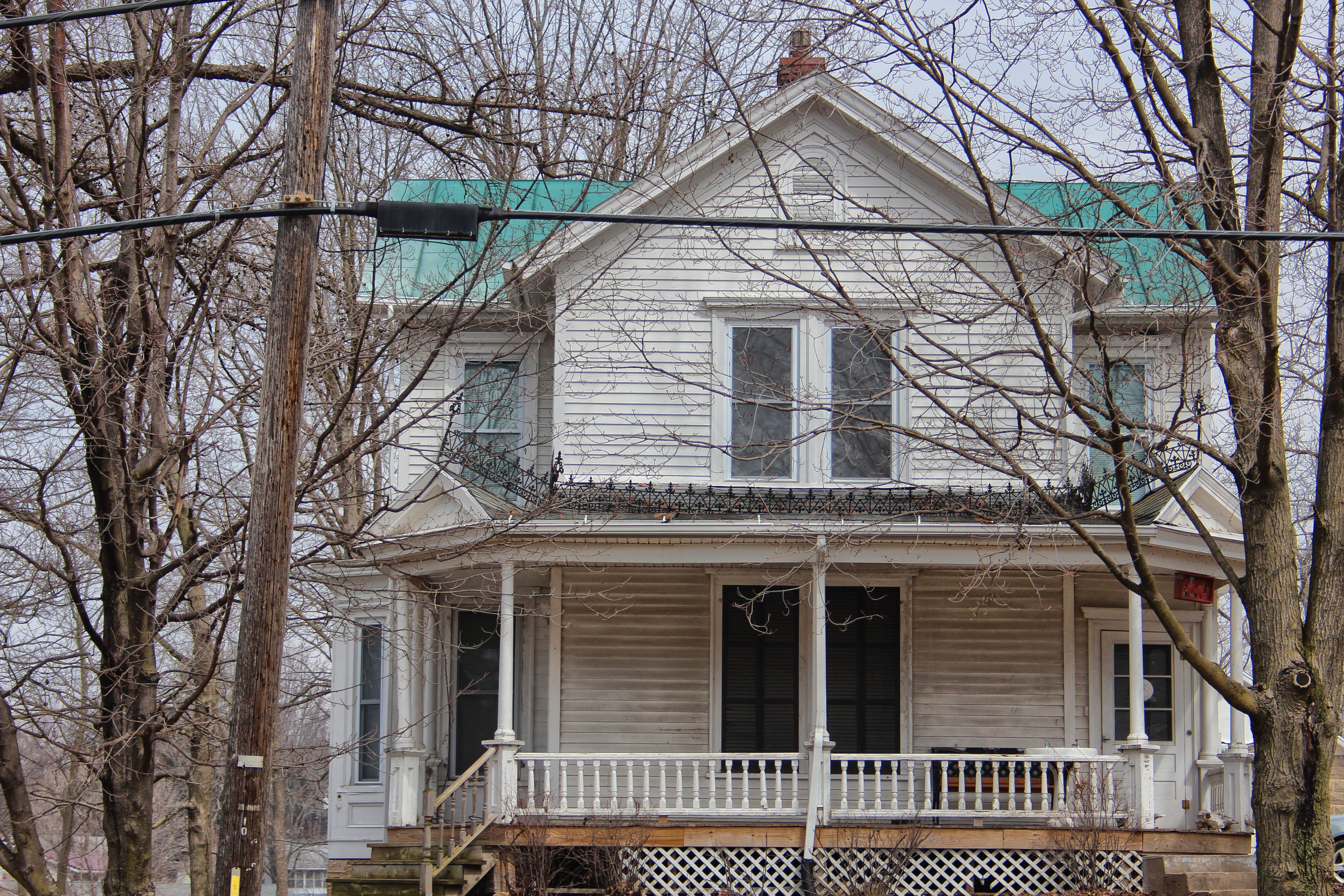
- Jonathan H. Evans House
- Location: 440 W. Adams St., Platteville, Wisconsin
- Coordinates: 42°44′20″N 90°28′53″W
- Area: 1.5 acres (0.61 ha)
- Built: 1870
- Architectural style: Italianate, Queen Anne
- NRHP reference No.: 82000670
- Added to NRHP: June 1, 1982

The Jonathan H. Evans House is located in Platteville, Wisconsin.

== History ==
Jonathan H. Evans was a prominent local politician, businessman, schoolteacher and bank vice president. He was also a leading figure in creating what is now the University of Wisconsin System. The house was listed on the National Register of Historic Places in 1982 and on the State Register of Historic Places in 1989.
