= Brian Slater =

English footballer

Personal information
- Full name: John Brian Slater
- Date of birth: 20 October 1932
- Place of birth: Sheffield, England
- Date of death: 10 September 1999 (aged 66)
- Place of death: Sheffield, England
- Position: Inside forward

Senior career*
Years	Team	Apps	(Gls)
1952–1953	Sheffield Wednesday	3	(0)
1954–1955	Grimsby Town	4	(0)
1955–1957	Rotherham United	17	(5)
1957–1958	Chesterfield	15	(3)
- Burton Albion
Total		39	(8)
- * Club domestic league appearances and goals

John Brian Slater (20 October 1932 – 10 September 1999) was an English professional footballer who played in the Football League as an inside forward.
