= Rolf Holmström =

Swedish footballer

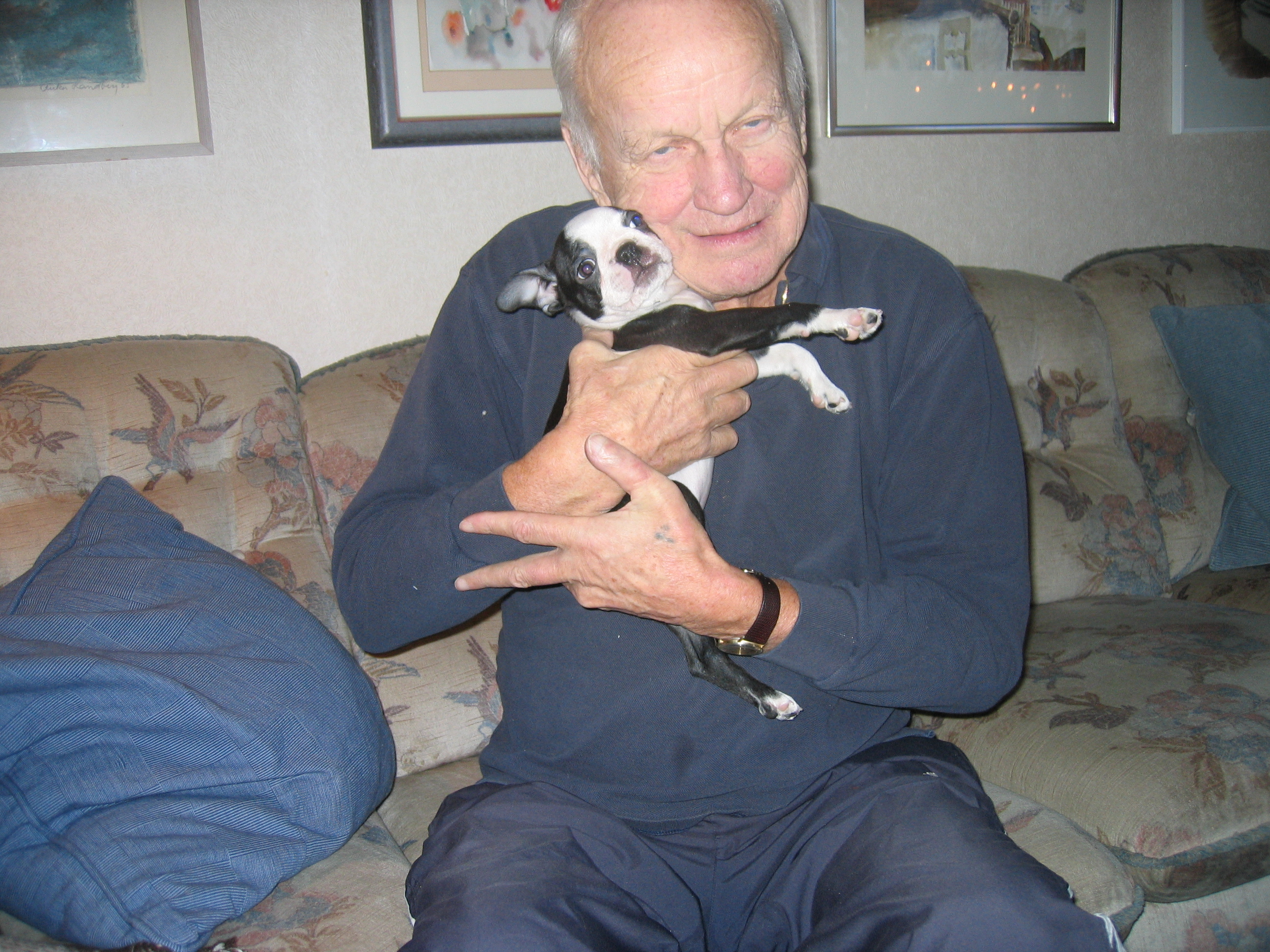
- Holmström and his Boston terrier

Personal information
- Full name: Rolf Holmström
- Date of birth: 7 September 1932
- Date of death: 21 June 2012 (aged 79)

Senior career*
Years	Team	Apps	(Gls)
1958–1960	GAIS	16	(3)
Total		16	(3)
- * Club domestic league appearances and goals

Rolf Holmström (7 September 1932 – 21 June 2012) was a Swedish footballer. Holmström played 12 games in the Swedish top flight in 1959 for GAIS, scoring three goals. He then also played four matches in the second flight for the club the next season before retiring. Before he played for GAIS, Holmström scored nine goals in a single second-flight game in a local derby against Skellefteå IF in 1958. Holmström died in June 2012, with his passing being reported by local Skellefteå newspaper Norran.
