= Edward B. and Nettie E. Evans House =

Historic house in Iowa, United States

- U.S. National Register of Historic Places
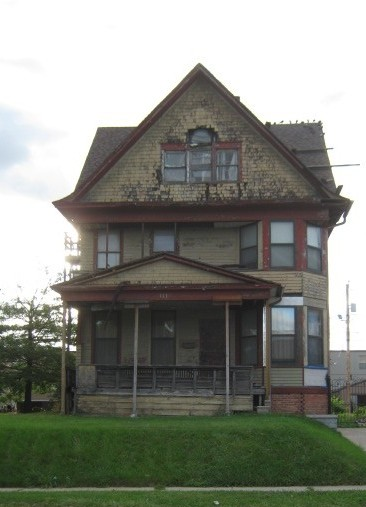

- Location within Iowa Location within the United States
- Location: 1410 19th St. Des Moines, Iowa
- Coordinates: 41°36′16.2″N 93°38′34.4″W
- Area: less than one acre
- Built: c. 1899
- Built by: Joseph Christy
- Architectural style: Queen Anne/Neoclassical
- NRHP reference No.: 02000294
- Added to NRHP: April 1, 2002

The Edward B. and Nettie E. Evans House is a former historic building in Des Moines, Iowa, United States. It was significant as the best Free Classic Queen Anne style dwelling in the city. It was a transitional architectural style. The 2½-story structure showed elements of both the Queen Anne and the Neoclassical styles. The Queen Anne was found in the asymmetrical plan, the complex roof treatment, the full width and recessed porches, and contrasting shingle patterns. The Neoclassical was found in the window and door trim, the grouped classical porch columns, and the Palladian window in the attic level.

Edward Evans was a lawyer who was the first secretary of the Drake College of Law, now the Drake University Law School, and the school's second Dean. He was also a law professor, and he authored a textbook. Edward and his wife Nettie lived here from 1899, when the house was built, until 1910. The house was listed on the National Register of Historic Places in 2002.

The house was declared a nuisance property in 2018 and proved unfeasible to renovate, so it was approved for demolition in January 2024.
