= John Silas Evans =

Welsh priest and astronomer (1864–1953)

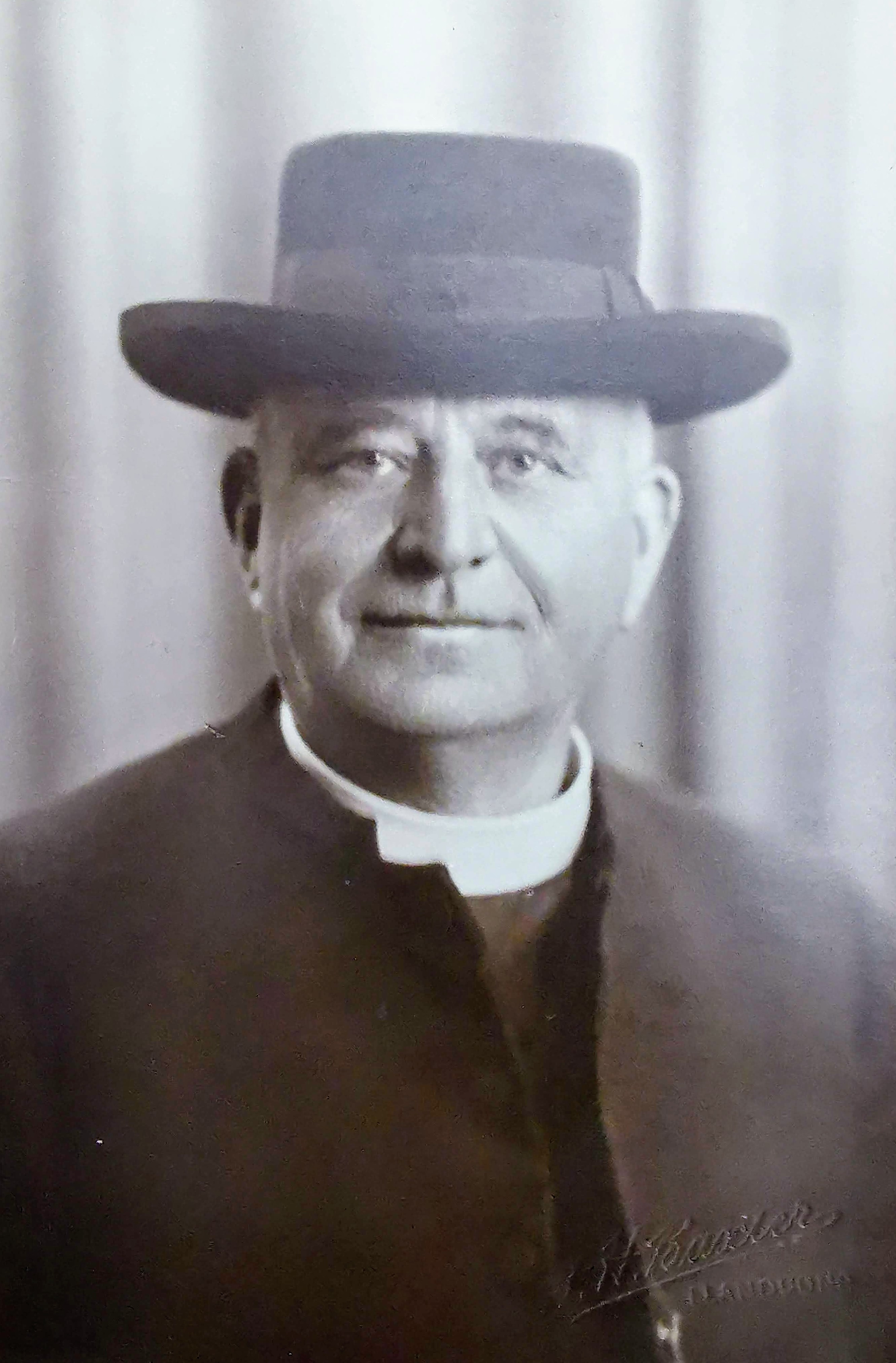
A studio portrait of John Silas Evans by J.H. Baxter, Llandudno, c. 1920s

John Silas Evans, Rev. (1864–1953) was a Welsh astronomer and priest. He became a senior figure within the Anglican Church in Wales and is well known for his astronomical writing published in Welsh and English.

== Early life and education ==
John Silas Evans was born in the village of Pencarreg in Carmarthenshire, south-west Wales. He attended Alcwyn's School in Carmarthen and a grammar school in Lampeter before studying at St David's College, Lampeter. He graduated with a bachelor's degree in theology in 1885 and won prizes for science and the Welsh language.^{[1]} Evans lectured at a college in Coventry for a year before his religious ordination in 1887.

== Clerical career ==
John Silas Evans had a varied and successful clerical career within the Anglican Church. He was first ordained as a deacon at St. Asaph Cathedral, Denbighshire, in 1887 and priested in 1888. Evans remained based in Welsh parishes, serving as a curate of Dyserth, Denbighshire, between 1887 and 1890 and of Rhos-ddu between 1890 and 1895. He served as a vicar of St. Asaph (1895–1901) and of the parish of Gyffylliod (1901–9), before settling in his role as vicar of the village church in Llanrhaeadr-ym-Mochnant. Evans remained in this remote parish community in the Berwyn Mountains for nearly three decades, until 1938.^{[2]}

== Parish historian ==
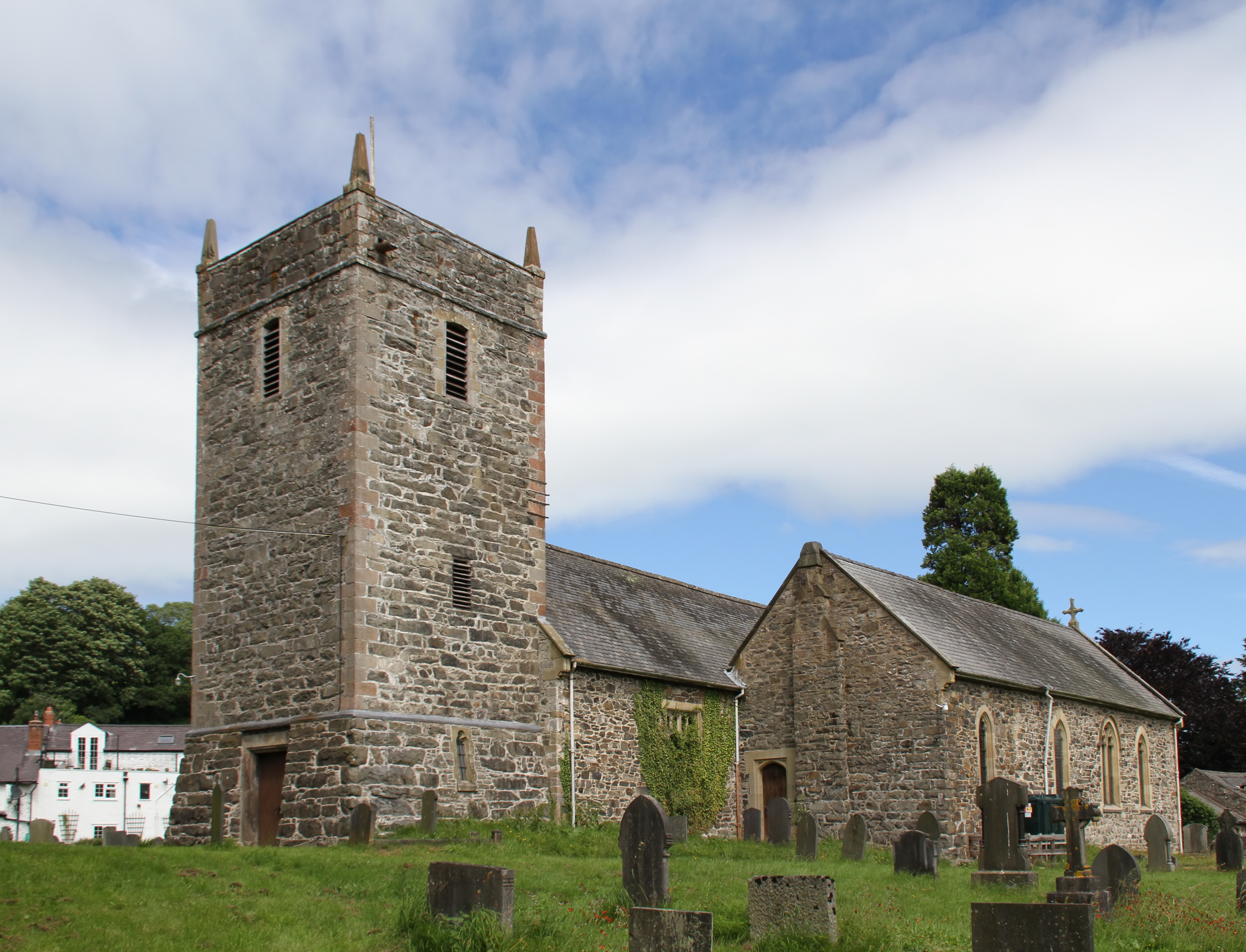
St Dogfan's Church in Llanrhaeadr-ym-Mochnant

Canon Silas Evans had a profound interest in the history of the parish of Llanrhaeadr-ym-Mochnant, where he served as vicar for most of his life. He lived in the church vicarage, one of the largest vicarages in the St. Asaph bishopric, set in a two-acre garden. This was also the residence of another illustrious historical personage associated with the area, Dr William Morgan, who served as vicar of St Dogfans between 1578 and 1588 and translated the Bible into the Welsh language.

Evans expressed his interest in the social, archeological and religious history of his parish in a Welsh language publication entitled Hanes Plwyf Llanrhaeadr ym Mochnant ('The History of the parish of Llanrhaeadr-ym-Mochnant') first published in 1940 and translated into English by Ceinwen Edwards in 1998. This parish history includes facts and anecdotes about salient local landmarks such as the nearby Pistyll Rhaedr waterfall, and a number of nearby standing stones (menhirs) and barrows. As well as discussing the area's ancient, druidic history, Evans touches on aspects of village's religious life, folklore and engagement with ancient healing magic, such as the use of elder bark to heal cancerous skin growths.

Evans wrote at length about the interior of the Church of St Dogfans, describing it as 'beautiful' and noting 'that the building is very old, though, naturally, it has been restored many times." One of the adaptations of the church interior that Evans was personally responsible for included the painting of stars and planets on the ceiling of the Church.

== Astronomical writing ==
On 31 January 1923 Evans was elected to the membership of the British Astronomical Association. He was proposed by Arthur Mee. On 9 November 1923 Evans was elected to the fellowship of the Royal Astronomical Society. These elections followed a life-time's interest in science and astronomy in evidence since his student days. One of Evans' most popular books, The Marvels of the Sky: An Introduction to Popular Astronomy (1921), was written while he lived in the vicarage in Llanrhaeadr. In the author's preface, Evans dedicates his book 'to my constant and faithful companion, my old Refractor telescope'. Evans' telescope was a four-inch telescope manufactured by the London optician Charles Tulley. The other astronomical writing by Evans is the Welsh language text Seryddiaeth a seryddwyr ('Astronomy and Astronomers'), 1923.

== Published sermons ==
Another format that Evans used to express his faith and interest in astronomy, were his sermons. He published Ad Astra, a collection of eight astronomical sermons concerned with the relationship between science and religion, in 1930. In his introduction to the book Evans defines these rhetorical pieces as 'a short series of sermons, or addresses, of an astronomical character, on the religious aspect of the science.' The first sermon, 'In the Beginning, God', explores the conflict between science and religion. Evans discusses several controversial points, such as the implications that scientific estimates for age of the planet hold for the story of creation in Genesis and the implications that Charles Darwin's Theory of Evolution hold for Christian faith. Subsequent sermons explore astronomical themes both within the context of Christianity and in a broader, secular context. For example, his sixth sermon, 'Are the Planets Inhabited?' discusses the possibility of alien life forms and his seventh sermon, 'Which was the Star of Bethlehem?' discusses the scientific basis, as well as the broader spiritual and metaphorical meaning of this well-known Star. In 1949 Evans published Myfyrion min yr hwyr, (Evening Reflections) a volume of Welsh language preaching and addresses.

Evans' work participates in a tradition of famous scientific churchmen such as John Donne, the metaphysical poet and Dean of St. Paul's Cathedral, whose well-known interest in astronomy and the Scientific Revolution found expression in his religious sermons as well as his lyric poetry. Evans enjoyed a high reputation for his sermons within his lifetime and preached at St. Paul's Cathedral in London in 1939. According to the author Mary Gwendoline Ellis, Evans 'had an exceptional memory and he could conduct church services almost completely from memory'.

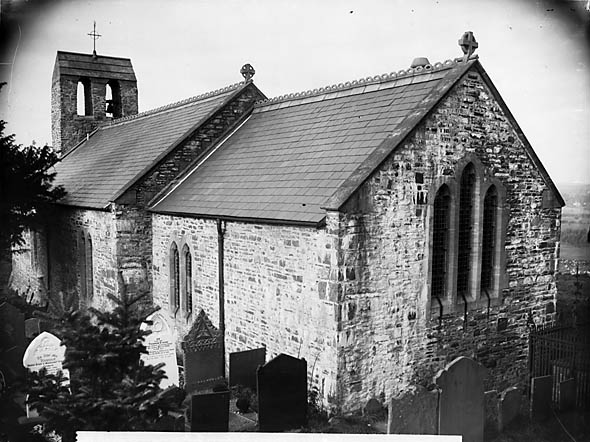
Church of Pencarreg, c. 1887

== Later years ==
In 1938 Evans retired and moved to Aberystwyth, reputedly to be near the National Library of Wales. He named his house in Aberystwyth 'Ad Astra', after the name of his book. Subsequently, Evans returned to his native village of Pencarreg where he died on 19 April 1953. He is buried in the graveyard of Pencarreg church.
