= Evans House (Salem, Virginia) =

Historic house in Virginia, United States

- U.S. National Register of Historic Places
- Virginia Landmarks Register

- Location within Virginia Location within the United States
- Location: 213 Broad St., Salem, Virginia
- Coordinates: 37°17′43″N 80°3′36″W
- Area: 9.9 acres (4.0 ha)
- Built: 1882
- Architectural style: French Empire
- NRHP reference No.: 72001529
- VLR No.: 129-0017

Significant dates
- Added to NRHP: May 19, 1972
- Designated VLR: March 21, 1972

Evans House is a historic home located at Salem, Virginia. It was built in 1882, and is a 1 1/2-story, L-shaped, French Empire style brick dwelling. It features two concavely cut intersecting mansard roofs which are pierced by two paneled interior chimneys with corbeled caps. The front facade is symmetrically divided by a two-story projecting central pavilion supported by a bracketed cornice and topped with a convexly rendered mansard roof.

It was added to the National Register of Historic Places in 1972.
