= Tom Fairley =

English footballer (1932–2018)

Personal information
- Full name: Thomas Fairley
- Date of birth: 12 October 1932
- Place of birth: Houghton-le-Spring, England
- Date of death: 16 April 2018 (aged 85)
- Place of death: South Tyneside, Tyne and Wear, England
- Height: 5 ft 10 in (1.78 m)
- Position: Goalkeeper

Youth career
- Bankhead Juniors

Senior career*
Years	Team	Apps	(Gls)
1951–1956	Sunderland	2	(0)
1956–1959	Carlisle United	56	(0)
1959–19??	Cambridge City		
- * Club domestic league appearances and goals

Thomas Fairley (12 October 1932 - 16 April 2018) was an English professional footballer who played as a goalkeeper for Sunderland.
