= Harry Nicholson =

English footballer

Personal information
- Full name: George Henry Nicholson
- Date of birth: 25 January 1932
- Place of birth: Wetheral, England
- Date of death: January 2015 (aged 82–83)
- Place of death: Bristol, England
- Position: Goalkeeper

Senior career*
Years	Team	Apps	(Gls)
1951–1952	Carlisle United	0	(0)
1952–1955	Grimsby Town	17	(0)
1955–1958	Nottingham Forest	72	(0)
1958–1959	Accrington Stanley	1	(0)
1959–1960	Leyton Orient	4	(0)
1960–1961	Bristol City	1	(0)
1961–1962	Poole Town		
1962–196?	Bath City		
- * Club domestic league appearances and goals

George Henry Nicholson (25 January 1932 – January 2015) was an English professional footballer who played as a goalkeeper in the Football League for Grimsby Town, Nottingham Forest, Accrington Stanley, Leyton Orient and Bristol City.
