= Benjamin Evans House =

Historic house in Pennsylvania, United States

- U.S. National Register of Historic Places
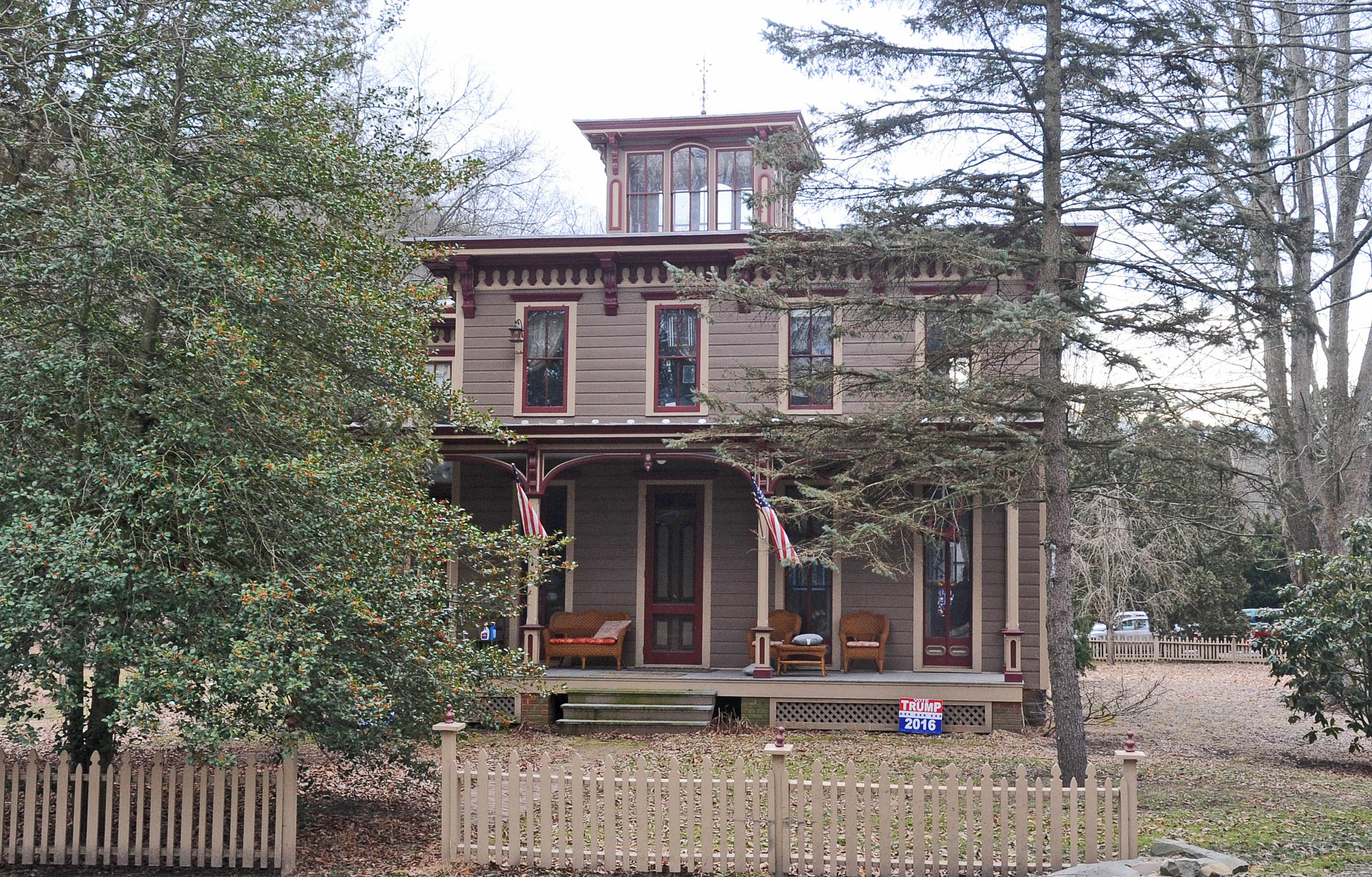

- Location within Pennsylvania Location within the United States
- Location: Off Pennsylvania Route 93 south of Nescopeck, Nescopeck Township, Pennsylvania
- Coordinates: 41°2′36″N 76°13′19″W
- Area: 3 acres (1.2 ha)
- Built: c. 1855
- Architectural style: Italian Villa
- NRHP reference No.: 83002260
- Added to NRHP: August 25, 1983

Benjamin Evans House is a historic home located in Nescopeck Township, Luzerne County, Pennsylvania. It was built about 1855, and is a two-story, frame dwelling in the Italian Villa style. It consists of two offset cubic structures, and sits on a stone foundation. It features a belvedere, a projecting main roof cornice, and three porches. Also on the property are a barn and coal shed built by the Works Progress Administration, the ruins of a grist mill foundation, and an abandoned road with stone arch bridge.

It was added to the National Register of Historic Places in 1983.
