= Giovanni Di Veroli =

Italian footballer (1932–2018)

Personal information
- Date of birth: 11 August 1932
- Place of birth: Rome, Italy
- Date of death: 1 June 2018 (aged 85)
- Place of death: Rome, Italy

Youth career
- Blue Star

Senior career*
Years	Team	Apps	(Gls)
1952–1957	Lazio	52	(0)
Total		52	(0)
- * Club domestic league appearances and goals

Giovanni Di Veroli (11 August 1932 – 1 June 2018) was an Italian professional footballer who played for Lazio, as a defender. Di Veroli was Jewish and began his career with Blue Star, a Jewish sports team.
