= John Evans (Gaelic footballer) =

Irish Gaelic footballer

Personal information
- Native name: Seán Ó hÉimhín (Irish)
- Born: 1955 (age 70–71) Skibbereen, County Cork, Ireland

Sport
- Sport: Gaelic football
- Position: Left corner-back
Club
- Years: Club
- O'Donovan Rossa
Club titles
- Cork titles: 1
- Munster titles: 1
- All-Ireland Titles: 1
Inter-county*
Years	County	Apps (scores)
1980-1987	Cork	16 (0-00)
Inter-county titles
- Munster titles: 1
- All-Irelands: 0
- NFL: 1
- All Stars: 1
- *Inter County team apps and scores correct as of 18:09, 3 January 2013.

John Evans (born 1955) is an Irish former Gaelic footballer who played as a left corner-back for the Cork senior team.

Evans joined the team during the 1980 championship and was a regular member of the starting fifteen until his retirement after the 1987 championship. During that time he won one Munster medal, one National League medal and one All-Star award. Evans was an All-Ireland runner-up on one occasions.

At club level Evans is a one-time All-Ireland medalist with O'Donovan Rossa. In addition to this he has also won one Munster medal and one county club championship medal.

John also won an Allstar award in 1983
