= Evans House (Phoenix, Arizona) =

Historic house in Arizona, United States

- U.S. National Register of Historic Places
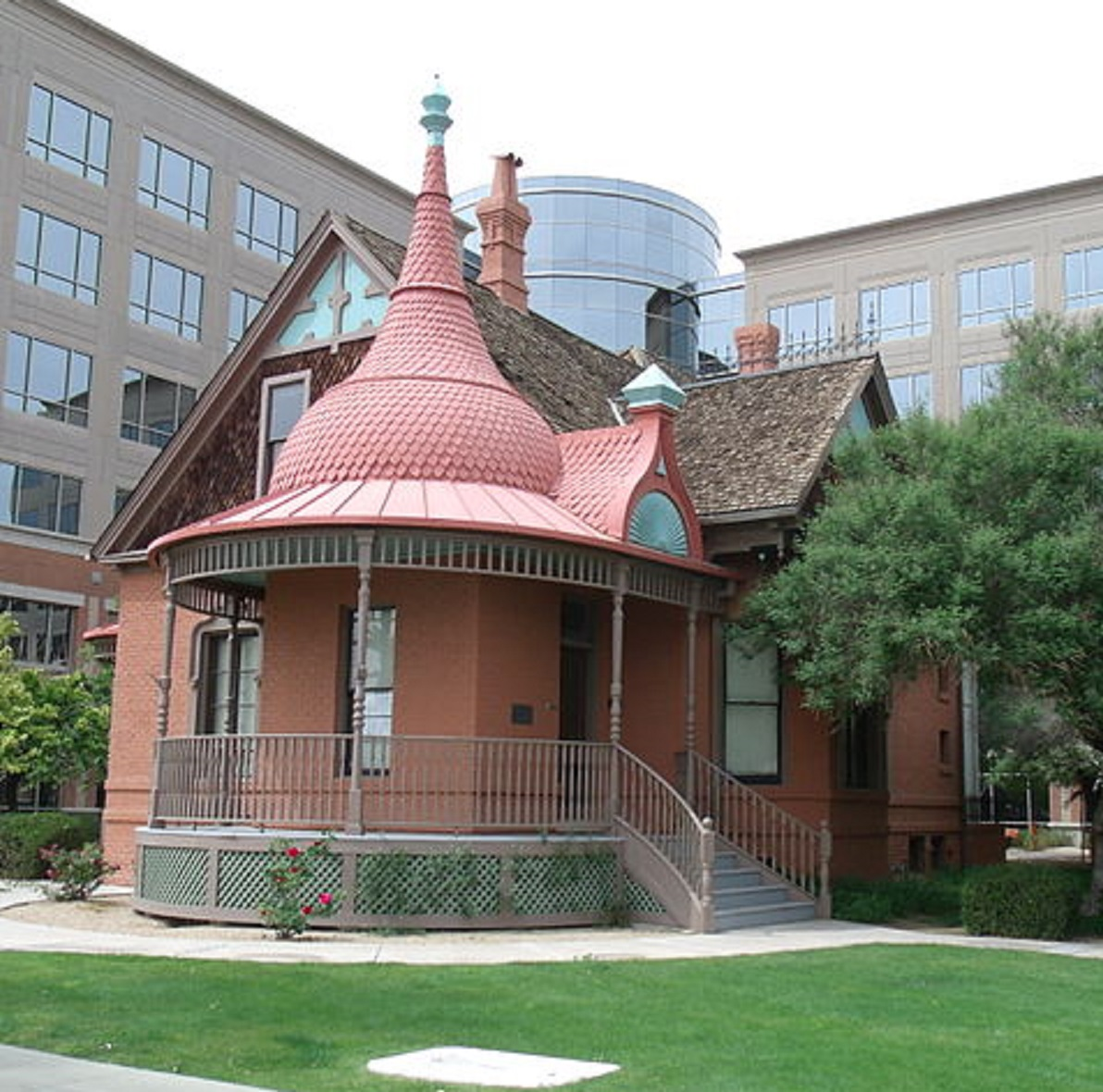

- Location within Arizona Location within the United States
- Location: 1108 W. Washington St., Phoenix, Arizona
- Coordinates: 33°26′54″N 112°5′11″W
- Area: 0.3 acres (0.12 ha)
- Built: 1893
- Architectural style: Queen Anne
- NRHP reference No.: 76000375
- Added to NRHP: September 1, 1976

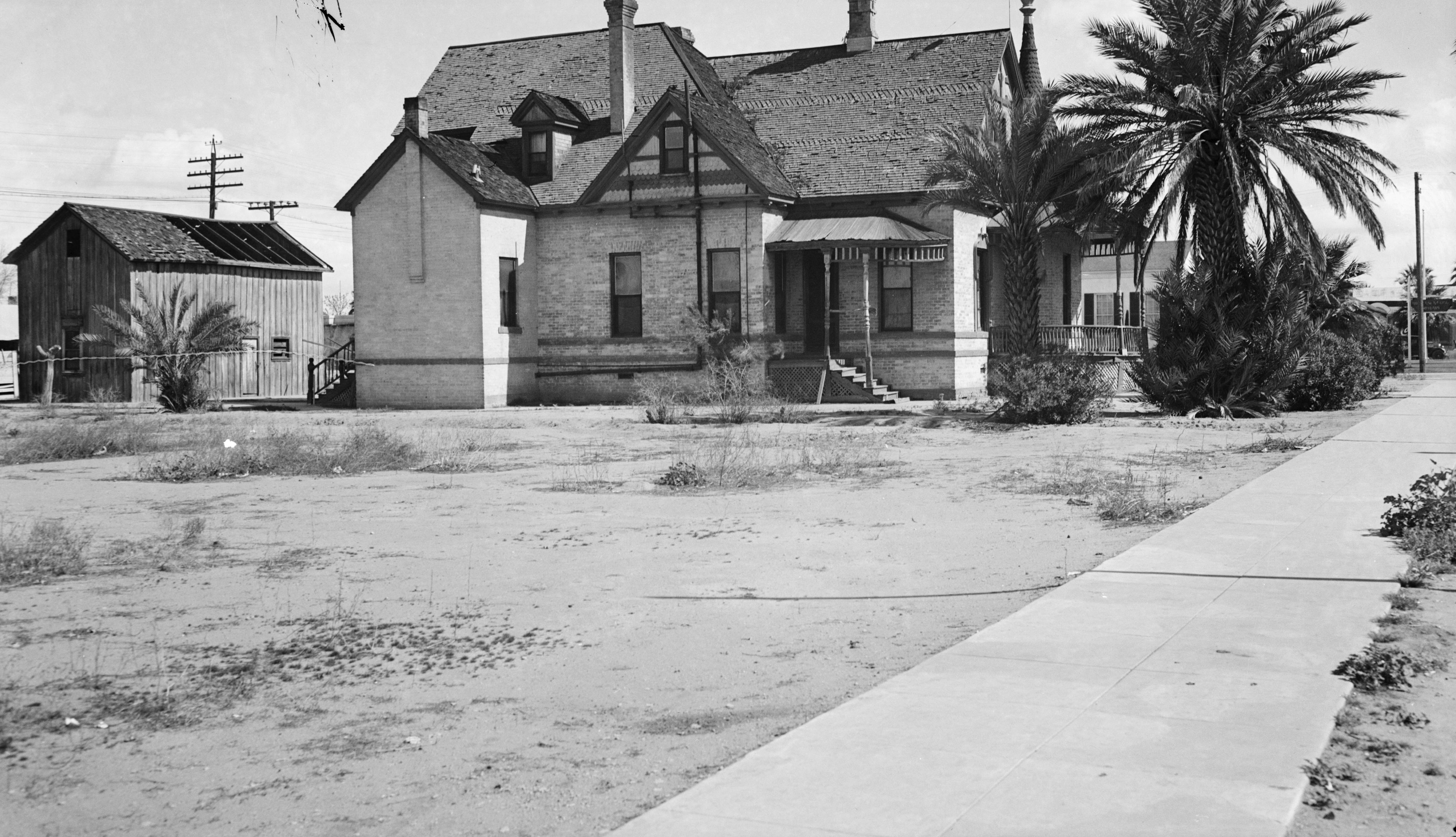
Evans House as it looked in the early 20th Century

The Evans House was built in 1893 by Doctor John M. Evans in Phoenix, Arizona. The 1 1/2-story brick residence has an unusual onion dome over the front entrance, rising from the semicircular front porch. The ground floor has seven rooms and was used as a residence, while the upper floor served as Dr. Evans' office and was reached by a separate exterior stairway.

The house was added to the National Register of Historic Places in 1976.
