= Wheeler-Evans House =

Historic house in Florida, United States

- U.S. National Register of Historic Places
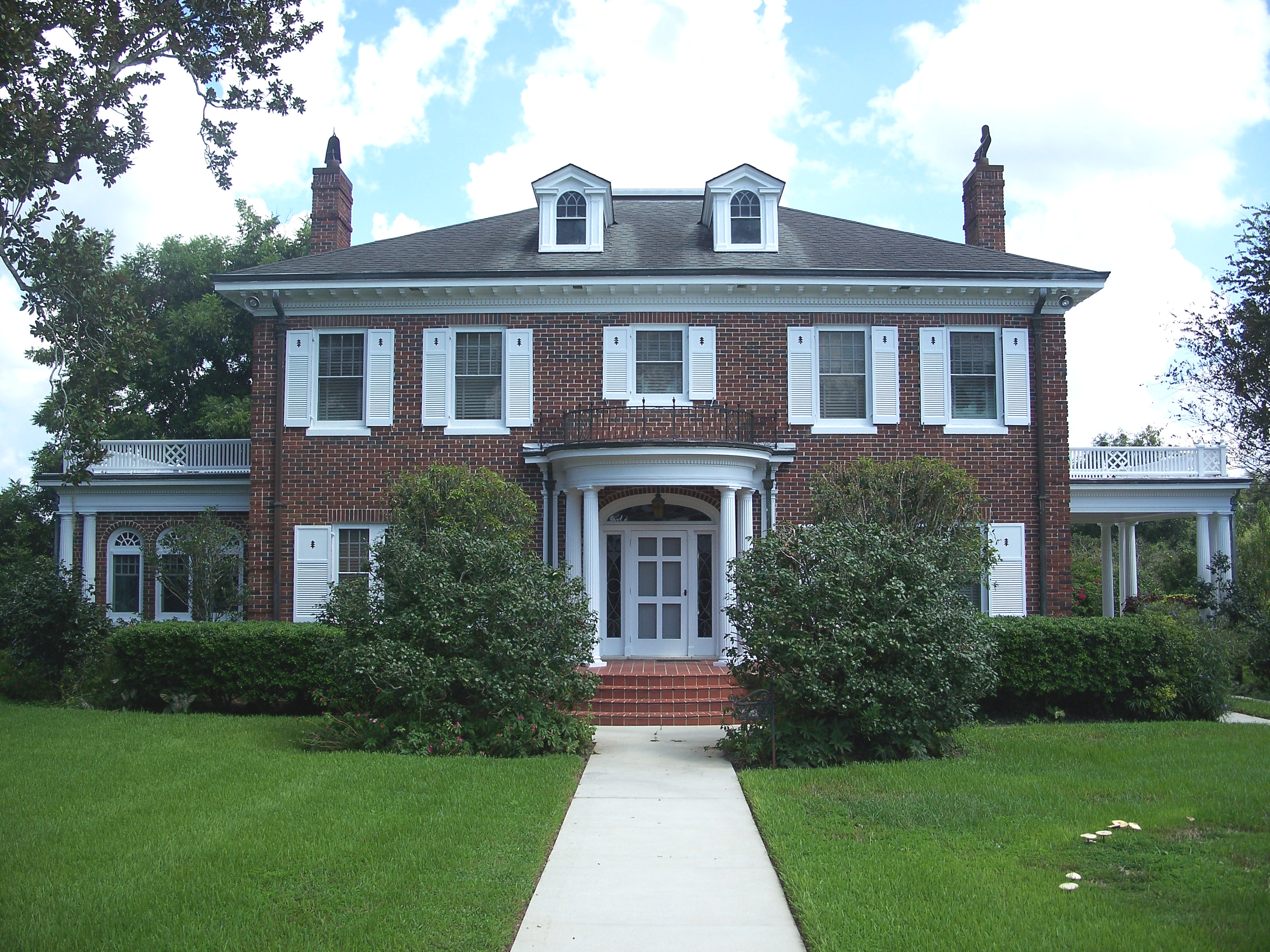

- Location within Florida Location within the United States
- Location: Oviedo, Florida
- Coordinates: 28°39′57″N 81°12′45″W
- Architectural style: Colonial Revival
- NRHP reference No.: 01001024
- Added to NRHP: September 20, 2001

The Wheeler-Evans House is a historic site in Oviedo, Florida. It is located at 340 South Lake Jesup Avenue. On September 20, 2001, it was added to the U.S. National Register of Historic Places.

== Gallery ==
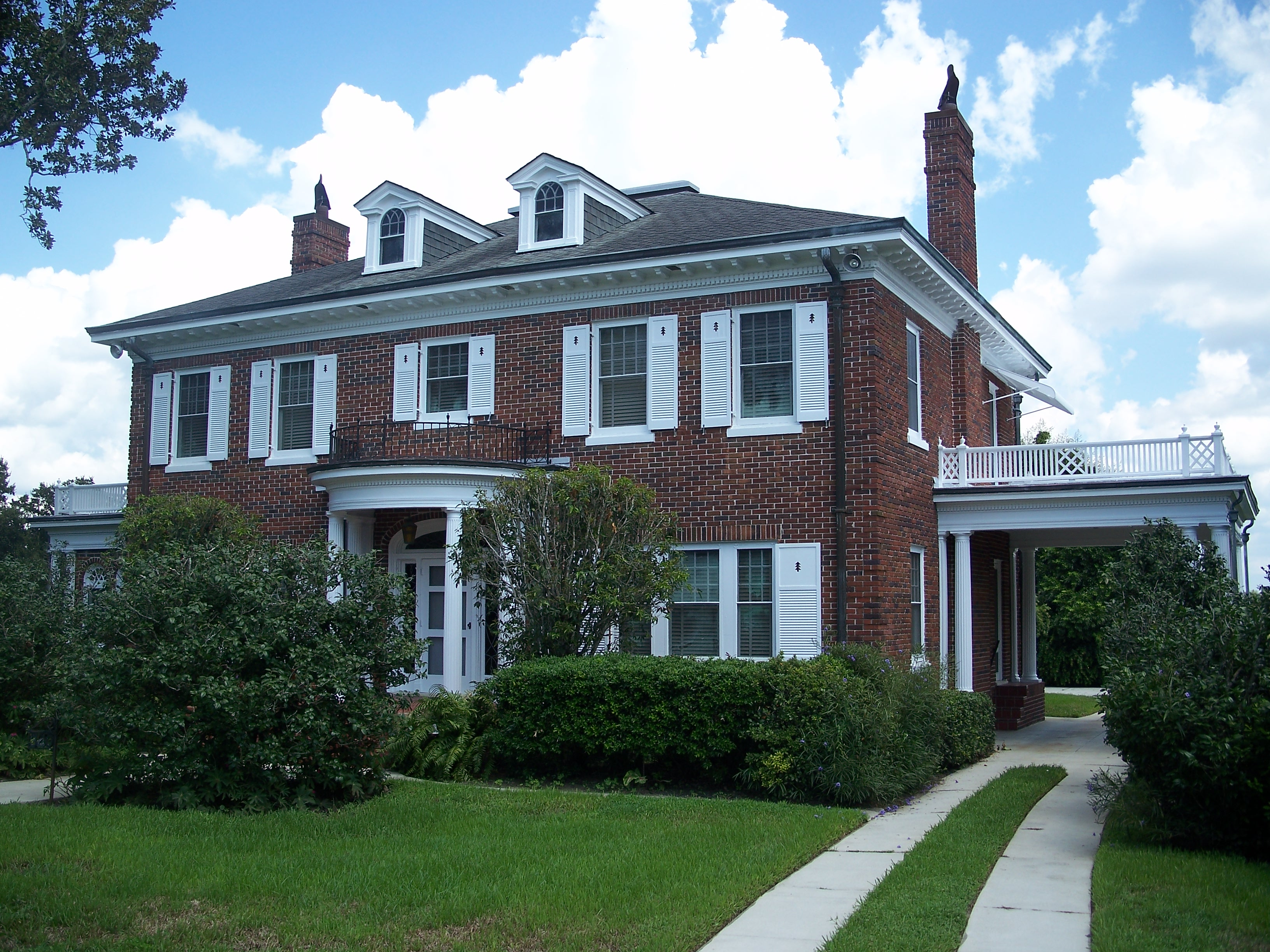

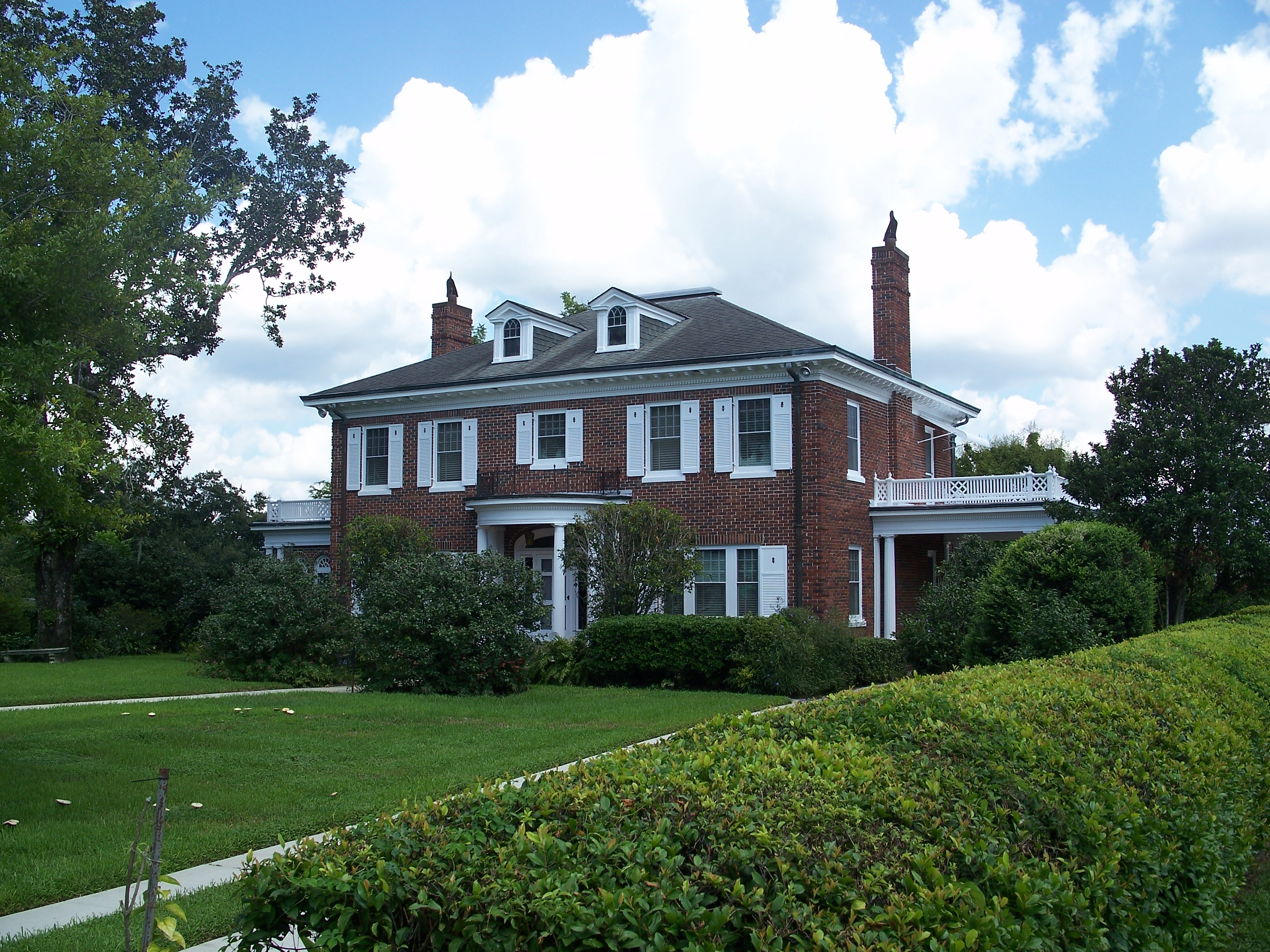
