= Jack Elwyn Evans =

Wales international rugby union & league footballer

Jack Evans
Personal information
- Full name: John Elwyn Evans
- Born: 1897; Brynamman, Wales
- Died: 15 July 1941 (aged 43–44); Denbigh, Wales

Playing information

Rugby union
- Position: Wing, Centre
Club
Years	Team	Pld	T	G	FG	P
	Brynamman RFC
	Amman United RFC
	Swansea RFC
≤1924–26	Llanelli RFC
	Total	0	0	0	0	0
Representative
Years	Team	Pld	T	G	FG	P
1924	Wales	1	0	0	0	0

Rugby league
Club
Years	Team	Pld	T	G	FG	P
1926	Broughton Rangers
- Source: scrum.com

John "Jack" Elwyn Evans (1897 – 15 July 1941) was a Welsh rugby union and professional rugby league footballer who played in the 1920s. He played representative level rugby union (RU) for Wales, and at club level for Brynamman RFC, Amman United RFC, Swansea RFC, and Llanelli RFC as a wing or centre, and club level rugby league (RL) for Broughton Rangers.

== Background ==
Jack Elwyn Evans was born in Brynamman, Wales, and he died aged 43–44 in Denbigh, Wales.

== International honours ==
Jack Evans won a cap for Wales (RU) while at Llanelli RFC in 1924 against Scotland.
