= John Evans House (Newark, Delaware) =

Historic house in Delaware, United States

- U.S. National Register of Historic Places
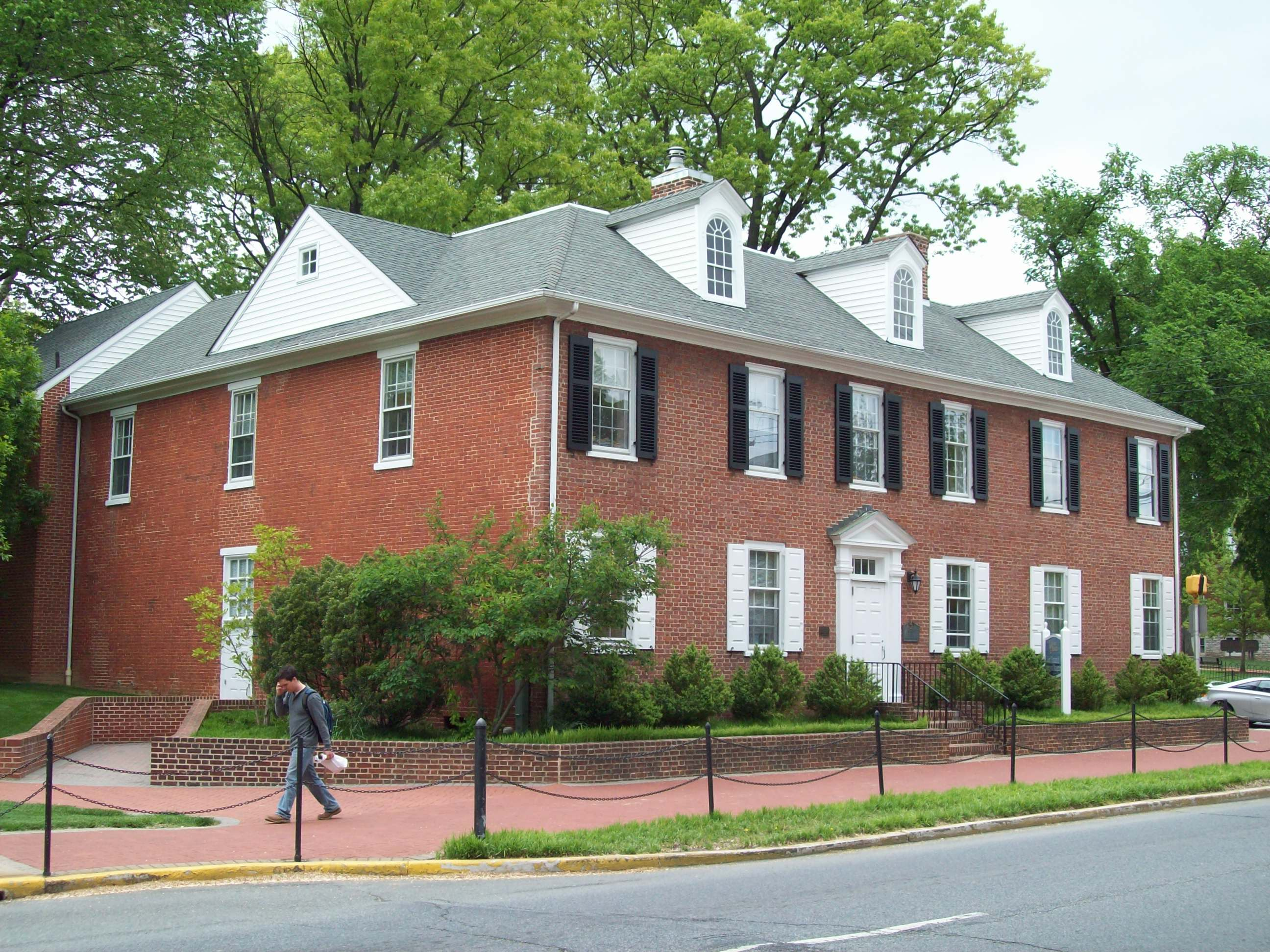
- John Evans House, April 2010

- Location within Delaware Location within the United States
- Location: 14 W. Main St., Newark, Delaware
- Coordinates: 39.683166°N 75.754288°W
- Area: 0.2 acres (0.081 ha)
- Built: 1800
- MPS: Newark MRA
- NRHP reference No.: 83001392
- Added to NRHP: February 24, 1983

John Evans House, also known as Raub Hall at the University of Delaware, is a historic home located at Newark in New Castle County, Delaware. The first section was built about 1800. The house in its present form is a two-story, gable roofed brick structure measuring six bays across. The original structure was expanded during the 19th and early 20th centuries to its present size. After 1888, it was converted to commercial use. In 1947, it was purchased by the University of Delaware and renovated in the 1960s for office space.

It was added to the National Register of Historic Places in 1983.

== See also ==
- National Register of Historic Places listings in Newark, Delaware
