= John Evans House (Martinsburg, West Virginia) =

Historic house in West Virginia, United States

- U.S. National Register of Historic Places
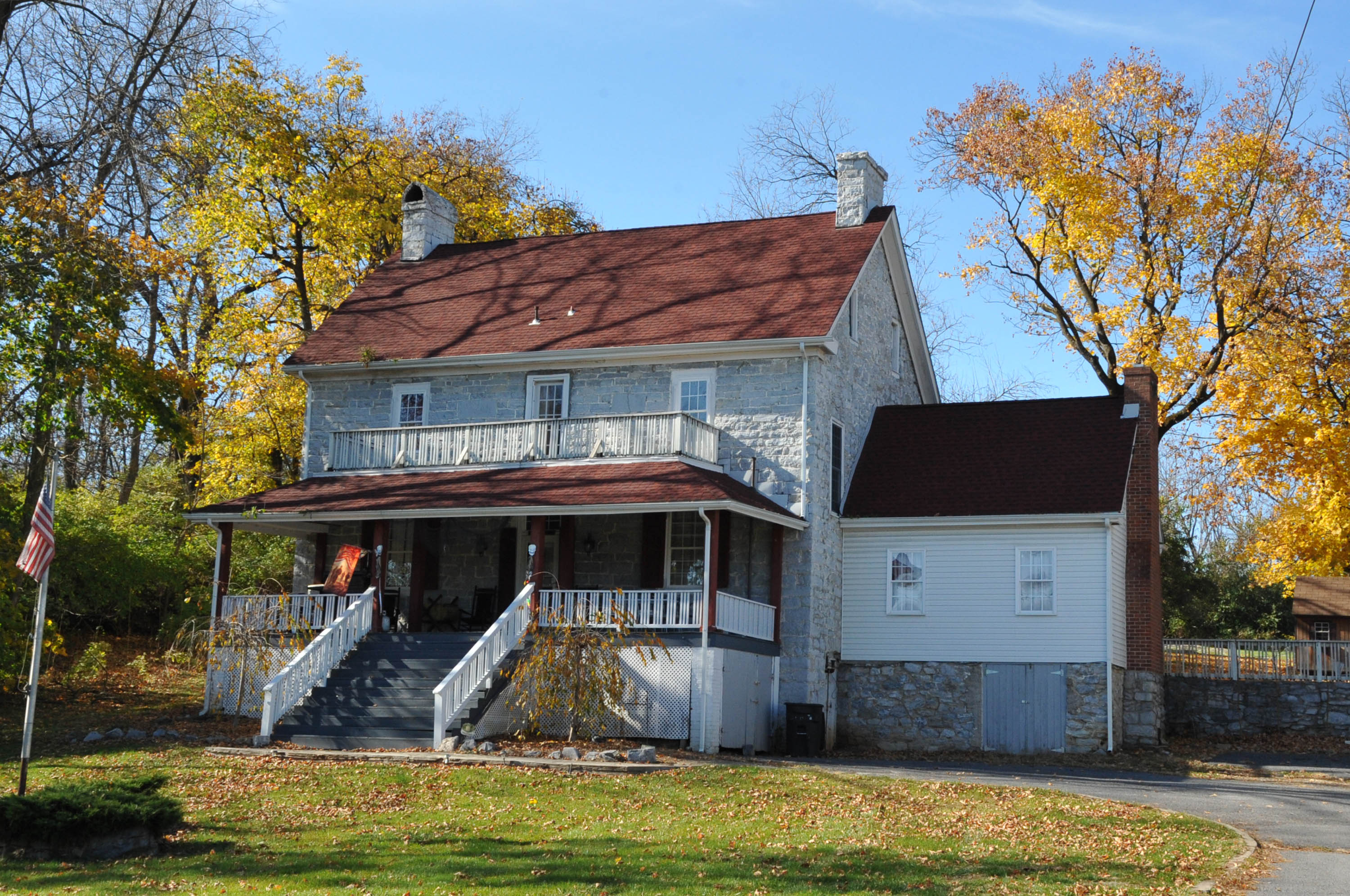

- Location within West Virginia Location within the United States
- Location: 2298 Winchester Ave., Martinsburg, West Virginia
- Coordinates: 39°25′44″N 77°59′17″W
- Built: 1756
- Architectural style: I-house
- NRHP reference No.: 06000168
- Added to NRHP: March 22, 2006

John Evans House, also known as Big Spring Farm, is located in Martinsburg, West Virginia. It was listed on the National Register of Historic Places in 2006.
