= John Evans (footballer, born 1932) =

English football player

Personal information
- Full name: John Evans
- Date of birth: 21 October 1932
- Place of birth: Hetton-le-Hole, England
- Date of death: February 2009 (aged 76)
- Place of death: Durham, England
- Position: Inside forward

Senior career*
Years	Team	Apps	(Gls)
1949–1954	Norwich City	0	(0)
1954–1956	Sunderland	1	(0)
1957–19??	Boston United		
- * Club domestic league appearances and goals

John Evans (21 October 1932 – February 2009) was an English professional footballer who played as an inside forward for Sunderland.
