= John William Evans (entomologist) =

British entomologist

John William Evans (16 January 1906 – 1990) was a British entomologist who worked as an entomology in Australia and served as director of the Australian Museum from 1954 to 1966. He was a specialist on the Hemiptera, especially the leafhoppers, and took an interest in aspects of biogeography and evolution.

Evans was born in India and went to Jesus College, Cambridge to study geology, botany and zoology, graduating in 1926. He then moved to Australia to study sharks and then joined the newly created CSIR (now called the CSIRO). He studied Cactoblastus on prickly pear. He then worked at the Cawthron Institute in New Zealand. He married Faith, the second daughter of the director, entomologist R.J. Tillyard. He moved to the Imperial Bureau of Entomology, Farnham to study Trichogramma parasites. He returned to Australia in 1929 and worked at CSIRO in Canberra and in 1935 he joined the Tasmanian Department of Agriculture. In 1945 he moved back to London to the Imperial Institute of Entomology and later served in the ministry of agriculture and fisheries. He became director of the Australian Museum in Sydney in 1954 and served there until 1966.

He was among the first to describe in detail the anatomy of moss bugs in the family Peloridiidae. He obtained specimens from Tasmania which were discovered by his wife and he described them as a new species Hemiodoecus fidelis (after the Latin for "faith").
