= Jack Evans (rugby union, born 1875) =

Wales international rugby union footballer

John Evans
- Born: John William Evans; 26 May 1875 Blaina, Wales
- Died: 5 July 1947 (aged 72) Blaina, Wales
- Occupation: collier

Rugby union career
- Position: Forward
Amateur team(s)
| Years | Team | Apps | (Points) |
| – | Blaina RFC | | |
International career
| Years | Team | Apps | (Points) |
| 1904 | Wales | 1 | (0) |

John William Evans (26 May 1875 – 5 July 1947) was a Welsh rugby union forward who played club rugby for Blaina and international rugby for Wales. A collier by trade, Evans typified the style of forward player favoured by the Welsh selectors during the early 1900s.

== Rugby career ==
Evans spent his entire rugby career with unfashionable Monmouthshire club Blaina, turning down several approaches by professional rugby league clubs to 'go North'. He had an immense loyalty to his home club and spent his entire life in the village where he was born. In 1904 Evans received his one and only international call-up, becoming the first player to be directly capped from Blaina RFC. Evans was brought into the Wales team to face England in the opening game of the 1904 Home Nations Championship, captained by Cardiff's Gwyn Nicholls. Evans was only one of two news caps in the Welsh squad for the encounter, the other being David John Thomas from Swansea; both men coming into the pack. The game ended in a draw, after a late try from Teddy Morgan was disallowed to prevent a Welsh victory. The Welsh selectors responded by bringing in five new caps for the next match, and Evans was one of those replaced.

After leaving his playing career behind, Evans became a committee man for Blaina. His family also had strong connections to the club, with his brother Alf captaining the team for two seasons, and his son Bill playing for Blaina before switching to first class team Newport. Evans died in 1947, just 100 yards from his birthplace. At his funeral, international rugby players Jack and Billy Gore were among his bearers.

=== International matches played for Wales ===
Wales

- England 1904

== Bibliography ==
- Godwin, Terry (1984). The International Rugby Championship 1883-1983. London: Willows Books. ISBN 0-00-218060-X.
- Griffiths, John (1987). The Phoenix Book of International Rugby Records. London: Phoenix House. ISBN 0-460-07003-7.
- Jenkins, John M.; et al. (1991). Who's Who of Welsh International Rugby Players. Wrexham: Bridge Books. ISBN 1-872424-10-4.
- Smith, David; Williams, Gareth (1980). Fields of Praise: The Official History of The Welsh Rugby Union. Cardiff: University of Wales Press. ISBN 0-7083-0766-3.
