= John Evans (Pennsylvania governor) =

John Evans (born about 1678) was a colonial governor of Pennsylvania, 3 February 1704 through 1 February 1709.

== Biography ==
Evans was of Welsh origin, and in February 1704, became deputy governor of the province, under the proprietor, William Penn. He was not a Quaker, and was doubtless selected out of deference to the court party, who did not believe in the peace principles of that sect. His administration was marked by quarrels with the assembly, and especially with the speaker of the house, David Lloyd, who headed the popular party. Disregarding the convictions of the Quakers, Evans, for the first time in the history of the colony, made a public call for troops, with the desire of assisting the other colonies against the French and Indians. The call met with no response, whereupon the governor, resorting to a discreditable ruse, arranged to have a messenger ride into Philadelphia on the day of the annual fair, announcing, with apparent consternation, that the French had arrived in the Delaware and were marching on the city. Evans then rode through the street with drawn sword, entreating the people to arm, and for a time great excitement prevailed. Valuables were hastily thrown into wells, and many people fled to the forests; but the Quakers, on whom Evans had wished to make an impression, continued quietly at their devotions, as it was the day for their "weekly meeting." The governor also built a fort at Newcastle, and unlawfully demanded tribute of all vessels passing up the river. One of his tax enforcers was captured by a ship he had been trying to tax and carried off to the Jersey side of the river where a furious Lord Cornbury (who had charter rights to regulate commerce on the river) upbraided him, whereupon Evans gave up on his tax. Evans had a good deal of learning and refinement, but his habits were unsuited to the Quaker City. Watson, in his "Annals of Philadelphia," says that in 1702 "Solomon Cresson, going his round at night, entered a tavern to suppress a riotous assembly, and found there John Evans, Esq., the governor, who fell to beating Cresson." Evans was finally recalled in February 1709, and was succeeded by Colonel Charles Gookin.

On 28 August 1709, he married Rebecca Moore in Philadelphia. After surrendering his office to Gookin, he remained for a time in Philadelphia but at length retired to Denbigh, Wales.
