= Evesham Township, New Jersey =

Township in Burlington County, New Jersey, US

- Township
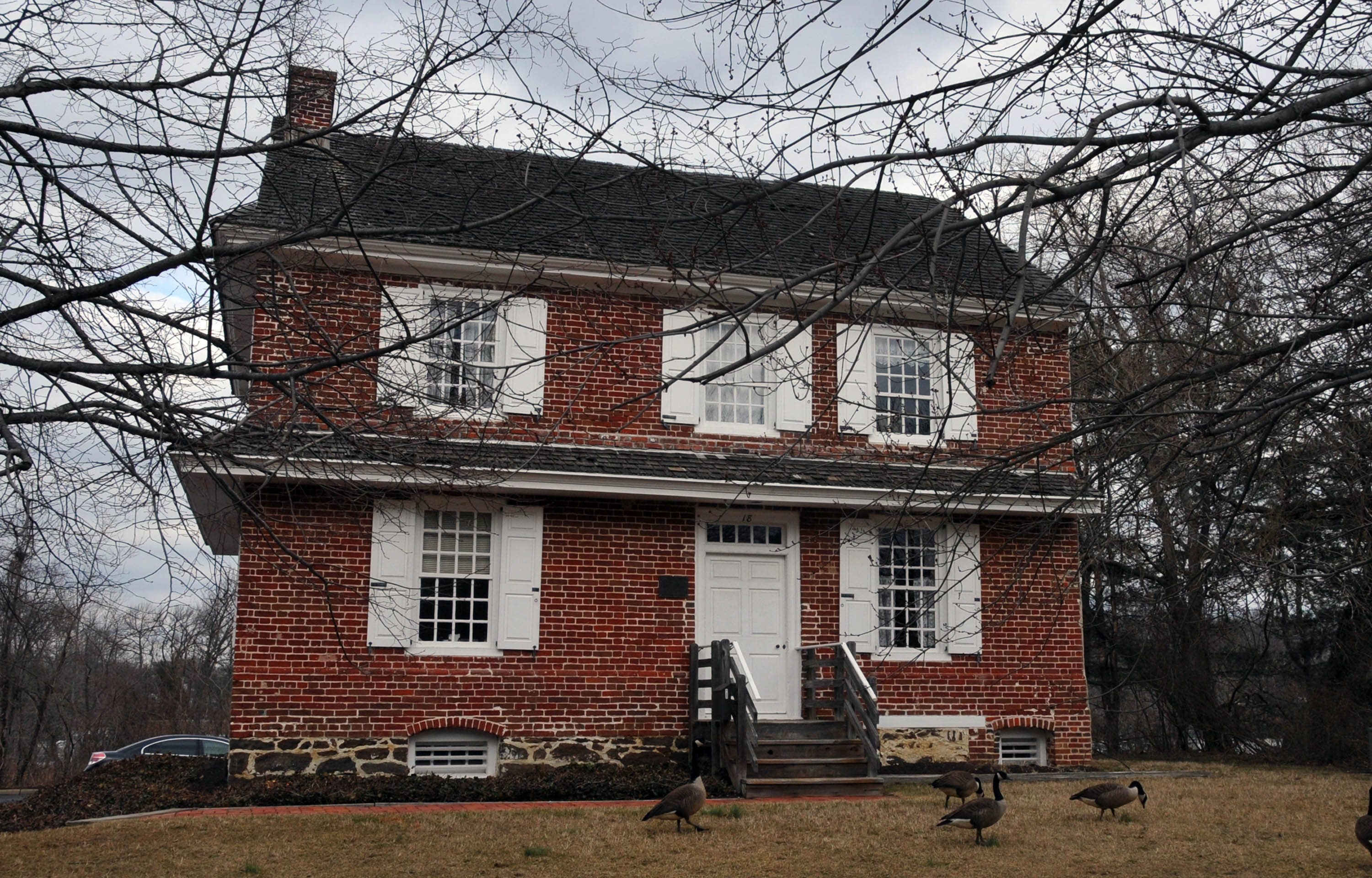
- Thomas Hollinshead House in Marlton

- Seal

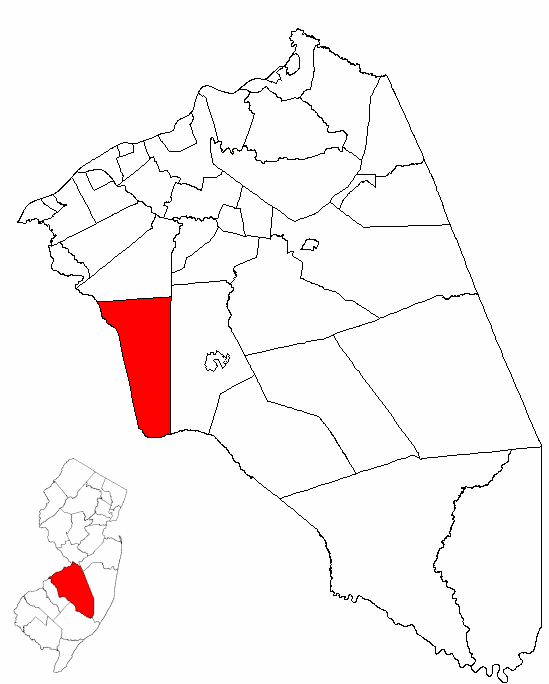
- Location of Evesham Township in Burlington County highlighted in red (right). Inset map: Location of Burlington County in New Jersey highlighted in red (lower left).

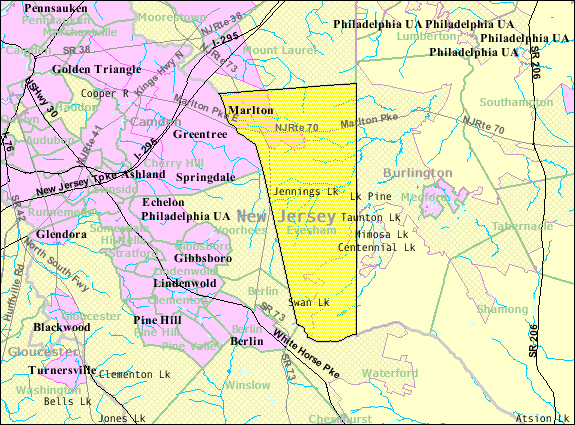
- Census Bureau map of Evesham Township, New Jersey

- Location in Burlington County Location in New Jersey Location in the United States
- Coordinates: 39.856677°N 74.90081°W
- Country: United States
- State: New Jersey
- County: Burlington
- Formed: November 6, 1688
- Incorporated: February 21, 1798
- Named for: Evesham, Worcestershire or settler Thomas Eves

Government
  - Type: Faulkner Act (council–manager)
  - Body: Township Council
  - Mayor: Jaclyn Veasy (D, term ends December 31, 2026)
  - Manager: Walt Miller
  - Municipal clerk: Rebecca Andrews

Area
  - Total: 29.58 sq mi (76.62 km^{2})
  - Land: 29.15 sq mi (75.51 km^{2})
  - Water: 0.43 sq mi (1.11 km^{2}) 1.45%
  - Rank: 91st of 565 in state 9th of 40 in county
- Elevation: 59 ft (18 m)

Population (2020)
  - Total: 46,826
  - Estimate (2025): 49,525
  - Rank: 44th of 565 in state 1st of 40 in county
  - Density: 1,606.1/sq mi (620.1/km^{2})
  - Rank: 328th of 565 in state 19th of 40 in county
- Time zone: UTC−05:00 (Eastern (EST))
  - Summer (DST): UTC−04:00 (Eastern (EDT))
- ZIP Code: 08053 – Marlton
- Area code: 856 exchanges: 396, 424, 489, 596, 751, 797, 810, 874, 983, 985, 988
- FIPS code: 34-22110
- GNIS ID: 882082
- Website: evesham-nj.org

Evesham Township is a township in Burlington County, in the U.S. state of New Jersey. It is a suburb of Philadelphia, the nation's sixth-most populous city. As of the 2020 United States census, the township's population was 46,826, an increase of 1,288 (+2.8%) from the 2010 census count of 45,538, which in turn reflected an increase of 3,263 (+7.7%) from the 42,275 counted in the 2000 census. Colloquially, the area is referred to as Marlton, the name of a community within the township.

The township is part of the South Jersey region of the state and, along with all of Burlington County, is a part of the Philadelphia metropolitan area.

== History ==
The area now known as Evesham Township was originally settled by Quakers in 1672. The township's name may have been inspired by the town of Evesham in England or possibly by a prominent English settler, Thomas Eves.

On November 6, 1688, Evesham Township was established as 'Eversham' in the Province of West Jersey, preceding the formation of the county itself. The extra "R" in the name was later dropped. It was officially incorporated as part of New Jersey's first 104 townships through the Township Act of 1798, enacted by the New Jersey Legislature on February 21, 1798.

Over time, portions of the township were sectioned off to form separate townships: Washington Township was formed on November 19, 1802, Medford Township on March 1, 1847, and Mount Laurel Township on March 7, 1872. The township was considerably larger than its present-day borders, initially encompassing what are now known as Mount Laurel, Medford, Lumberton, Hainesport, Shamong, and Washington Townships. Geographically, the South Branch of the Rancocas on the east and Cropwell Creek on the west originally bounded this area.

The township was incorporated in 1692, becoming one of the initial thirteen townships in Burlington County. Following subsequent separations, Evesham Township was divided for the final time in 1872, when the northern part of the township was designated as Mount Laurel Township.

Evesham Township is often referred to as Marlton, a name that is used interchangeably, originating from the census-designated place within the township. The moniker 'Marlton' traces its origins to the early 19th century and is derived from "marl," a naturally occurring mixture of green clay with shell remnants, which was used as a fertilizer. The extraction of marl, a significant economic activity, catalyzed the first "building boom" in the 1830s and 1840s. Local marl mining continued until 1930.

Recognized as a village in 1758, Marlton was officially named in 1845. That same year, both the "Evesham" Post Office and the "Evesham" Baptist Church adopted the "Marlton" name. To this day, most maps and directional signs use 'Marlton' rather than 'Evesham'. The historical village, Olde Marlton, largely remains intact and is recognized as a locally regulated Historic District. The township instituted full-time police services in 1966.

During the mid 19th century, the township was also home to the Milford Settlement, a community of free and fugitive Black populations that served as a stop on the Underground Railroad, being officially added to the New Jersey Black Heritage in 2025.

Until the 1950s, Evesham Township retained much of its original character. However, developers began purchasing farms and creating the township's first housing developments, eliminating significant farmland by the present day.

In 1955, the United States Army opened the PH-32 Nike Ajax facility on a 38-acre (15 ha) on Tomlinson Mill Road. This facility served as one of twelve defense installations protecting Philadelphia, Pennsylvania, from potential aerial attacks during the Cold War. The base was decommissioned in the mid-1960s and subsequently served various purposes, including acting as a civil defense center. By the mid-1990s, the site had been repurposed into a housing development.

== Geography ==
According to the United States Census Bureau, the township had a total area of 29.59 square miles (76.62 km^{2}), including 29.16 square miles (75.51 km^{2}) of land and 0.43 square miles (1.11 km^{2}) of water (1.45%).

Marlton is an historic community, census-designated place (CDP) and unincorporated area within Evesham Township with 10,594 residents (as of Census 2020) that covers 3.235 square miles (8.38 km^{2}) of the township. "Marlton" is often used in place of the township's name, often referring to locations beyond the CDP's boundaries.

Other unincorporated communities, localities and place names partially or completely within the township include Berlin Heights, Cambridge Park, Cropwell, Crowfoot, Donlontown, Elmwood Road, Evans Corner, Evesboro, Gibbs Mill, Milford, Pine Grove and Tomlinsons Mill.

The township borders the municipalities of Mount Laurel and Medford in Burlington County; and Berlin Township, Cherry Hill, Voorhees Township and Waterford Township in Camden County.

The township is one of 56 South Jersey municipalities included within the Pinelands National Reserve, a protected natural area of unique ecology covering 1,100,000 acres (450,000 ha), that has been classified as a United States Biosphere Reserve and established by Congress in 1978 as the nation's first National Reserve. Part of the township is included in the state-designated Pinelands Area, which includes parts of Burlington County, along with areas in Atlantic, Camden, Cape May, Cumberland, Gloucester and Ocean counties.

== Demographics ==
Historical population
Census	Pop.	Note	%±
1800	3,381		—
1810	3,445	*	1.9%
1820	3,977		15.4%
1830	4,239		6.6%
1840	5,060		19.4%
1850	3,067	*	−39.4%
1860	3,145		2.5%
1870	3,351		6.6%
1880	1,602	*	−52.2%
1890	1,501		−6.3%
1900	1,429		−4.8%
1910	1,408		−1.5%
1920	1,284		−8.8%
1930	1,694		31.9%
1940	1,655		−2.3%
1950	2,121		28.2%
1960	4,548		114.4%
1970	13,477		196.3%
1980	21,508		59.6%
1990	35,309		64.2%
2000	42,275		19.7%
2010	45,538		7.7%
2020	46,826		2.8%
2025 (est.)	49,525		5.8%
Population sources: 1800–2000; 1800–1920 1840 1850–1870; 1850 1870 1880–1890; 1890–1910 1910–1930; 1940–2000 2000; 2010 2020 *= Lost territory in previous decade.

=== 2010 census ===
The 2010 United States census counted 45,538 people, 17,620 households, and 12,316 families in the township. The population density was 1,555.1 per square mile (600.4/km^{2}). There were 18,303 housing units at an average density of 625.0 per square mile (241.3/km^{2}). The racial makeup was 86.98% (39,609) White, 4.19% (1,910) Black or African American, 0.12% (54) Native American, 6.16% (2,804) Asian, 0.02% (9) Pacific Islander, 0.78% (357) from other races, and 1.75% (795) from two or more races. Hispanic or Latino of any race were 3.39% (1,542) of the population.

Of the 17,620 households, 32.8% had children under the age of 18; 57.1% were married couples living together; 9.8% had a female householder with no husband present and 30.1% were non-families. Of all households, 25.4% were made up of individuals and 8.6% had someone living alone who was 65 years of age or older. The average household size was 2.56 and the average family size was 3.12.

23.3% of the population were under the age of 18, 7.6% from 18 to 24, 26.2% from 25 to 44, 29.8% from 45 to 64, and 13.1% who were 65 years of age or older. The median age was 40.5 years. For every 100 females, the population had 91.3 males. For every 100 females ages 18 and older there were 87.9 males.

The Census Bureau's 2006–2010 American Community Survey showed that (in 2010 inflation-adjusted dollars) median household income was $88,980 (with a margin of error of +/− $2,687) and the median family income was $104,784 (+/− $3,519). Males had a median income of $73,801 (+/− $3,907) versus $50,667 (+/− $3,039) for females. The township's per capita income was $39,910 (+/− $1,464). About 1.5% of families and 2.5% of the population were below the poverty line, including 2.5% of those under age 18 and 4.6% of those age 65 or over.

=== 2000 census ===
As of the 2000 United States census, there were 42,275 people, 15,712 households, and 11,344 families residing in the township. The population density was 1,431.1 inhabitants per square mile (552.6/km^{2}). There were 16,324 housing units at an average density of 552.6 per square mile (213.4/km^{2}). The township's racial makeup was 91.26% White, 3.11% African American, 0.07% Native American, 4.07% Asian, 0.02% Pacific Islander, 0.48% from other races, and 0.99% from two or more races. Hispanic or Latino of any race were 1.96% of the population.

There were 15,712 households, of which 38.2% had children under the age of 18 living with them, 61.2% were married couples living together, 8.5% had a female householder with no husband present, and 27.8% were non-families. 22.8% of all households were made up of individuals, and 6.0% had someone living alone who was 65 years of age or older. The average household size was 2.68 and the average family size was 3.21.

The township's population was spread out, with 27.2% under the age of 18, 6.0% from 18 to 24, 34.8% from 25 to 44, 23.1% from 45 to 64, and 8.9% who were 65 years of age or older. The median age was 36 years. For every 100 females, there were 94.1 males. For every 100 females age 18 and over, there were 90.3 males.

The township's median household income was $67,010, and the median family income was $77,245. Males had a median income of $54,536 versus $36,494 for females. The township's per capita income was $29,494. About 1.7% of families and 2.8% of the population were below the poverty line, including 3.0% of those under age 18 and 3.4% of those age 65 or over.

== Government ==
=== Local government ===
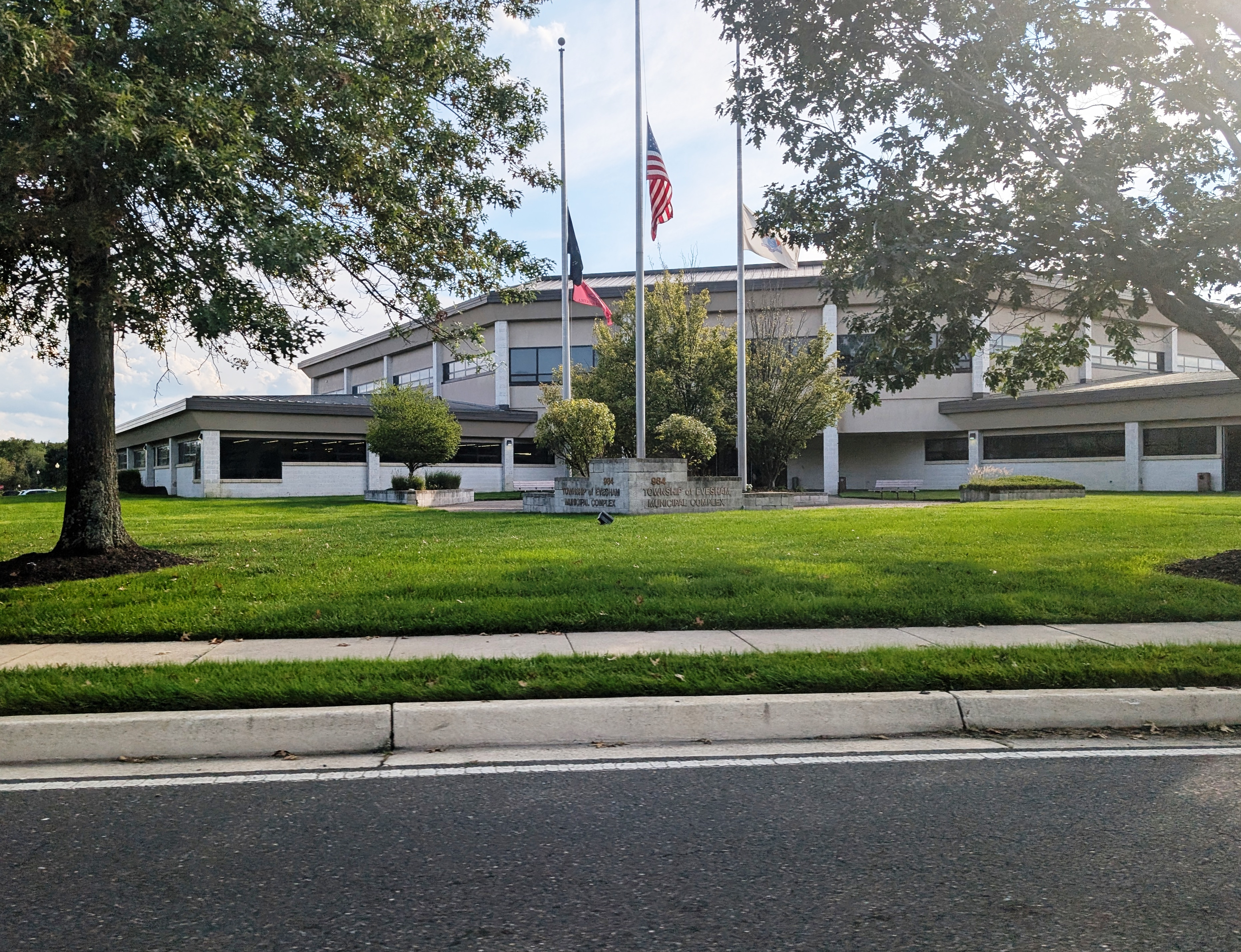
Evesham Township Municipal Complex

Evesham Township operates within the Faulkner Act, formally known as the Optional Municipal Charter Law, under the Council-Manager plan 11 form of municipal government, as implemented as of July 1, 1983, based on the recommendations of a Charter Study Commission. The township is one of 42 municipalities (of the 564) statewide that use this form of government. The township had first switched to the Council-Manager Plan B of the Faulkner Act on July 1, 1969 to replace the township committee government.

The governing body is comprised of the Mayor and the four-member Township Council, all elected at-large in elections held every other year. The Mayor is elected directly by the voters. Members are elected in partisan elections to serve four-year terms of office on a staggered basis, with two council seats up for vote in even-numbered years as part of the November general election. In 2009, a change was approved to shift municipal elections from May to November and from non-partisan to partisan, with officials citing low May turnout and costs estimated at $50,000 to oversee the municipal elections.

As of 2024, the Mayor of Evesham Township is Democrat Jaclyn Veasy, whose term of office ends December 31, 2026. Members of the Evesham Township Council are Deputy Mayor Ginamarie A. Espinoza (D, 2024), Heather Cooper (D, 2026), Eddie S. Freeman III (D, 2024) and Krystal Hunter (D, 2026; elected to serve an unexpired term).

In October 2024, Krystal Hunter appointed to fill the seat expiring in December 2026 that became vacant following the resignation of Patricia Hansen the previous month.

In the May 2009 municipal elections, Republicans Kurt Croft, Debbie Hackman and Joe Howarth were elected, with the three taking office on July 1, 2009, and giving Republicans control of the council.

On March 6, 2010, Democratic Mayor Randy Brown announced he was switching parties to become a Republican, citing philosophical disagreements. That same year, he endorsed Jon Runyan, a Republican for Congress.

In November 2010, the Republican slate swept the township's first partisan elections, with Mayor Randy Brown and Councilmember Debbie Hackman winning re-election along with newcomer Steve Zeuli.

Deputy Mayor Joe Howarth resigned from the council in December 2011 in advance of taking a seat on the Burlington County Board of Chosen Freeholders, with his council seat filled until November 2012 chosen from among prospective candidates selected by the local Republican committee. In January 2012, Ken D'Andrea was selected to fill Howarth's vacancy. Robert DiEnna was chosen in September 2013 to fill the vacancy of Kurt Croft following his resignation.

=== Federal, state and county representation ===
Evesham Township is in the 3rd Congressional District and is part of New Jersey's 8th state legislative district.

For the 119th United States Congress, New Jersey's 3rd congressional district is currently represented Herb Conaway (D, Delran Township). New Jersey is represented in the United States Senate by Democrats Cory Booker (Newark, term ends 2027) and Andy Kim (Moorestown, term ends 2031).

For the 2026–2027 session, the 8th legislative district of the New Jersey Legislature is represented in the New Jersey Senate by Latham Tiver (R, Southampton Township) and in the General Assembly by Anthony Angelozzi (D, Hammonton) and Andrea Katz (D, Chesterfield Township).

Burlington County is governed by a Board of County Commissioners comprised of five members who are chosen at-large in partisan elections to serve three-year terms of office on a staggered basis, with either one or two seats coming up for election each year; at an annual reorganization meeting, the board selects a director and deputy director from among its members to serve a one-year term. As of 2026, Burlington County's Commissioners are: Director Felicia Hopson (D, Willingboro Township, term as commissioner ends December 31, 2027; term as director ends 2026), Deputy Director Allison Eckel (D, Medford, term as commissioner ends 2028; term as deputy director ends 2026), Randy Brolo (D, Lumberton, 2026; elected to an unexpired term), Tyler Burrell (D, Delran Township, 2027) and Tom Pullion (D, Edgewater Park, 2026).

Burlington County's constitutional officers are Clerk Joanne Schwartz (D, Southampton Township, 2028), Sheriff James H. Kostoplis (D, Bordentown, 2028) and Surrogate Brian J. Carlin (D, Burlington Township, 2026).

=== Politics ===
United States presidential election results for Evesham Township 2024 2020 2016 2012 2008 2004
Year	Republican		Democratic		Third party(ies)	
Year	No.	%	No.	%	No.	%
2024	11,316	43.42%	14,453	55.45%	295	1.13%
2020	12,581	42.29%	16,765	56.35%	406	1.36%
2016	10,850	44.35%	12,739	52.07%	877	3.58%
2012	10,863	46.02%	12,507	52.99%	234	0.99%
2008	10,764	44.75%	13,071	54.34%	218	0.91%
2004	11,369	49.57%	11,419	49.79%	147	0.64%

As of March 2011, there were 30,697 registered voters in Evesham Township, of which 8,924 (29.1% vs. 33.3% countywide) were registered as Democrats, 7,282 (23.7% vs. 23.9%) were registered as Republicans and 14,475 (47.2% vs. 42.8%) were registered as Unaffiliated. There were 16 voters registered to other parties. Among the township's 2010 Census population, 67.4% (vs. 61.7% in Burlington County) were registered to vote, including 87.9% of those ages 18 and over (vs. 80.3% countywide).

Gubernatorial election results for Evesham
Year	Republican		Democratic		Third party(ies)	
Year	No.	%	No.	%	No.	%
2025	9,208	41.97%	12,629	57.56%	103	0.47%
2021	8,615	48.47%	9,076	51.06%	83	0.47%
2017	5,546	43.73%	6,919	54.56%	216	1.70%
2013	8,664	68.31%	3,890	30.67%	129	1.02%
2009	7,628	54.16%	5,626	39.94%	831	5.90%
2005	6,552	50.07%	6,088	46.53%	445	3.40%

In the 2012 presidential election, Democrat Barack Obama received 12,507 votes here (52.7% vs. 58.1% countywide), ahead of Republican Mitt Romney with 10,863 votes (45.7% vs. 40.2%) and other candidates with 234 votes (1.0% vs. 1.0%), among the 23,752 ballots cast by the township's 32,323 registered voters, for a turnout of 73.5% (vs. 74.5% in Burlington County). In the 2008 presidential election, Democrat Barack Obama received 13,071 votes here (54.0% vs. 58.4% countywide), ahead of Republican John McCain with 10,764 votes (44.5% vs. 39.9%) and other candidates with 218 votes (0.9% vs. 1.0%), among the 24,186 ballots cast by the township's 30,579 registered voters, for a turnout of 79.1% (vs. 80.0% in Burlington County). In the 2004 presidential election, Democrat John Kerry received 11,419 votes here (49.7% vs. 52.9% countywide), ahead of Republican George W. Bush with 11,369 votes (49.5% vs. 46.0%) and other candidates with 147 votes (0.6% vs. 0.8%), among the 22,989 ballots cast by the township's 28,314 registered voters, for a turnout of 81.2% (vs. 78.8% in the whole county).

In the 2013 gubernatorial election, Republican Chris Christie received 8,664 votes here (67.4% vs. 61.4% countywide), ahead of Democrat Barbara Buono with 3,890 votes (30.3% vs. 35.8%) and other candidates with 129 votes (1.0% vs. 1.2%), among the 12,848 ballots cast by the township's 32,005 registered voters, yielding a 40.1% turnout (vs. 44.5% in the county). In the 2009 gubernatorial election, Republican Chris Christie received 7,628 votes here (53.7% vs. 47.7% countywide), ahead of Democrat Jon Corzine with 5,626 votes (39.6% vs. 44.5%), Independent Chris Daggett with 698 votes (4.9% vs. 4.8%) and other candidates with 133 votes (0.9% vs. 1.2%), among the 14,196 ballots cast by the township's 31,081 registered voters, yielding a 45.7% turnout (vs. 44.9% in the county).

United States Senate election results for Evesham Township1
Year	Republican		Democratic		Third party(ies)	
Year	No.	%	No.	%	No.	%
2024	10,199	40.14%	14,920	58.72%	290	1.14%
2018	9,886	46.98%	10,060	47.81%	1,096	5.21%
2012	10,103	45.48%	11,974	53.90%	138	0.62%
2006	6,431	48.44%	6,650	50.09%	196	1.48%

United States Senate election results for Evesham Township2
Year	Republican		Democratic		Third party(ies)	
Year	No.	%	No.	%	No.	%
2020	12,528	43.25%	16,062	55.45%	378	1.30%
2014	6,201	50.27%	5,970	48.39%	165	1.34%
2013	3,665	50.53%	3,516	48.48%	72	0.99%
2008	10,282	47.14%	11,222	51.45%	306	1.40%

== Education ==
The Evesham Township School District serves students in pre-kindergarten through eighth grade. As of the 2021–22 school year, the district, comprised of eight schools, had an enrollment of 4,384 students and 348.0 classroom teachers (on an FTE basis), for a student–teacher ratio of 12.6:1. Schools in the district (with 2021–22 enrollment data from the National Center for Education Statistics) are Helen L. Beeler Elementary School with 544 students in grades K-5, Frances S. DeMasi Elementary School with 283 students in grades K-5, Robert B. Jaggard Elementary School with 452 students in grades K-5, Marlton Elementary School with 430 students in grades K-5, Richard L. Rice Elementary School with 559 students in grades PreK-5, J. Harold Van Zant Elementary School with 573 students in grades K-5, Frances S. DeMasi Middle School with 732 students in grades 6-8 and Marlton Middle School with 772 students in grades 6-8.

Public school students in ninth through twelfth grades attend Cherokee High School, which opened a 210,000-square-foot (20,000 m^{2}) addition in September 2001. As of the 2021–22 school year, the high school had an enrollment of 2,165 students and 174.9 classroom teachers (on an FTE basis), for a student–teacher ratio of 12.4:1. The high school is part of the Lenape Regional High School District, which also serves students from Medford Lakes, Medford, Mount Laurel, Shamong Township, Southampton Township, Tabernacle Township and Woodland Township.

Students from Evesham Township, and from all of Burlington County, are eligible to attend the Burlington County Institute of Technology, a countywide public school district that serves the vocational and technical education needs of students at the high school and post-secondary level at its campuses in Medford and Westampton.

Private schools include St. Joan of Arc School, a Catholic school established in 1965 that serves students in preschool through eighth grade. The school operates under the supervision of the Roman Catholic Diocese of Trenton.

== Transportation ==
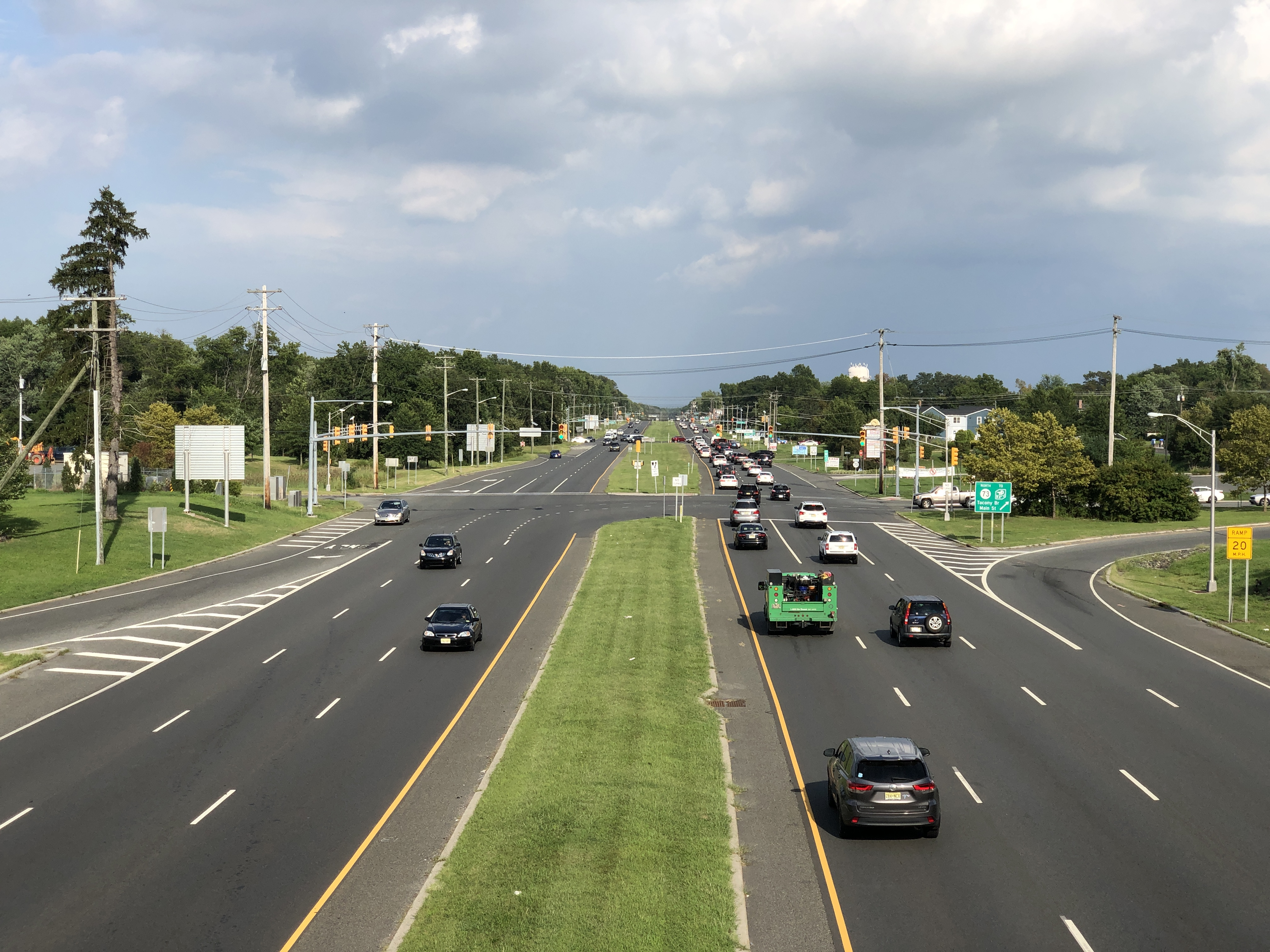
Route 70 eastbound at Route 73 in Evesham Township

=== Roads and highways ===
As of May 2010, the township had 183.43 miles (295.20 km) of roadways, of which 159.35 miles (256.45 km) were maintained by the municipality, 15.28 miles (24.59 km) by Burlington County and 8.80 miles (14.16 km) by the New Jersey Department of Transportation.

Route 70, which runs east-west across the northern part of the township, Route 73, which runs north-south along the township's western border, and County Route 544 (Marlton Parkway / Taunton Lake Road) are the major roadways in the township.

Evesham Township was the location of the Marlton Circle, which served as the junction of Route 70 and Route 73. In 2011, the circle, which handled 90,000 vehicles a day and was the site of as many as 175 accidents a year, was replaced by a grade-separated interchange that allows Route 73 to pass over Route 70.

=== Public transportation ===
NJ Transit provides bus service in the township on the 406 route that runs between Berlin and Philadelphia.

The Atco station, in Waterford Township just south of the township's border, provides New Jersey Transit train service to the 30th Street Station in Philadelphia and the Atlantic City Rail Terminal in Atlantic City on the Atlantic City Line.

== Notable people ==
People who were born in, residents of, or otherwise closely associated with Evesham Township include:

- Dawn Marie Addiego (born 1962), member of the New Jersey Senate since 2010 who served on the Evesham Township Council from 1993 to 2000
- Shawn Andrews (born 1982), offensive lineman for the New York Giants, formerly played for the Philadelphia Eagles
- Brian Baldinger (born 1960), former NFL offensive tackle and current Fox Sports commentator
- Esther E. Baldwin (1840-1910), missionary, teacher and writer
- Joshua Beckley, poker player who won $4.4 million after finishing second at the main event of the 2015 World Series of Poker
- Jay Black (born 1976), stand-up comic and screenwriter
- Braille (stage name of Bryan Winchester, born 1981), rapper
- Christopher J. Brown (born 1971), member of the New Jersey General Assembly
- Sheldon Brown (born 1979), defensive back for the Philadelphia Eagles and the Cleveland Browns
- Greg Burke (born 1982), former professional baseball pitcher who played for the San Diego Padres and New York Mets
- Anthony Caruso (born 1966), entrepreneur
- Mike Devlin (born 1969), former NFL offensive lineman who has been an assistant coach with the New York Jets
- Joshua Evans (1731–1798), Quaker minister, journalist and abolitionist
- Jeff Gallo, college football coach and former player who is the head coach for the Monmouth Hawks football team
- Christina Grimmie (1994–2016), YouTube musician and season 6 contestant on The Voice
- Brian Herzlinger (born 1976), film director and star of My Date with Drew
- LeRoy Homer Jr. (1965–2001), co-pilot of United Airlines Flight 93 who was killed in the September 11 terrorist attacks
- Joe Howarth (born 1955), politician who has represented the 8th Legislative District in the New Jersey General Assembly since 2016
- John Inskeep (1757–1834), Mayor of Philadelphia from 1800 to 1801, and from 1805 to 1806
- Pam Jenoff (born 1971, class of 1989), author of Quill award-nominated The Kommandant's Girl
- Andy Kim (born 1982), representative of New Jersey's 3rd congressional district
- Tom Knight (born 1974), former NFL cornerback
- Lee B. Laskin (1936–2024), attorney, politician and judge who served in both houses of the New Jersey Legislature before being appointed to serve on the New Jersey Superior Court
- Pelle Lindbergh (1959–1985), former goaltender for the Philadelphia Flyers
- LeSean McCoy (born 1988), former NFL running back
- Jody McDonald (born 1959), sports radio talk show host on WTEL 610 and also on WFAN 660
- Liz Montague, cartoonist, who was one of the first Black cartoonists to have her work published in The New Yorker
- Brit Morgan (born 1987), actress who has played the role of Debbie Pelt in the HBO series True Blood
- Blaine Neal (born 1978), former Major League Baseball relief pitcher
- Dennis Norman (born 1980), football player
- Jessica O'Rourke (born 1986), professional soccer player
- Bill Osborn (born c. 1966), former American football player who played professionally in the National Football League, World League and the Arena Football League
- Jerry Penacoli (born 1956), actor, former newscaster, current correspondent on Extra
- Mike Quick (born 1959), former wide receiver and current color commentator for the Philadelphia Eagles
- Raymond Rizzo (born 1992), pro-gamer, three-time Pokémon Video Game World Champion and first American to win the Pokémon Video Game World Championship
- Sav Rocca (born 1973), punter for the Washington Redskins, formerly played for the Philadelphia Eagles
- Maria Rodriguez-Gregg (born 1981), member of the New Jersey General Assembly
- Richard Ruccolo (born 1972), actor who has appeared in Two Guys and a Girl and Rita Rocks
- Chris Therien (born 1971), former defenseman for the Philadelphia Flyers and Dallas Stars. Currently works as a color commentator for the Philadelphia Flyers
- Carl Truscott (born 1957), former Director of the Bureau of Alcohol, Tobacco, Firearms and Explosives
- Jessica Woodard (born 1995), track and field athlete who competes in shot put
