= LeRoy Homer Jr. =

Pilot on United Airlines Flight 93 (1965–2001)

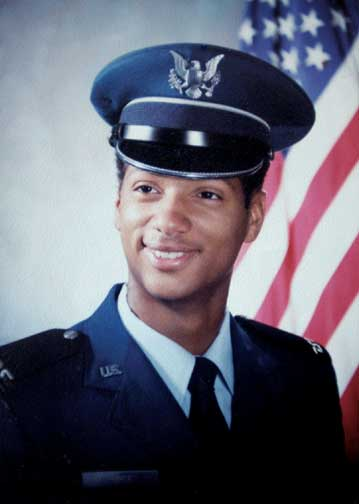
- LeRoy Homer Jr. in 1984
- Born: LeRoy Wilton Homer Jr. August 27, 1965; Plainview, New York, U.S.
- Died: September 11, 2001 (aged 36); Stonycreek Township, Somerset County, Pennsylvania, U.S. aboard Flight 93
- Cause of death: Terrorist attack as part of September 11 attacks
- Known for: First officer of United Airlines Flight 93
- Spouse: Melodie Homer (m. 1998)
- Children: Laurel Homer
- Homer's voice First Mayday call at 09:28:17; Recorded September 11, 2001

LeRoy Wilton Homer Jr. (August 27, 1965 – September 11, 2001) was the first officer of United Airlines Flight 93, which was hijacked as part of the September 11 attacks in 2001, and crashed into a field near Shanksville, Pennsylvania, killing all 37 passengers and seven crewmembers, including Homer.

"Mayday – 09:28:50"
Second mayday call at 09:28:50 made by LeRoy Homer.

== Early life ==
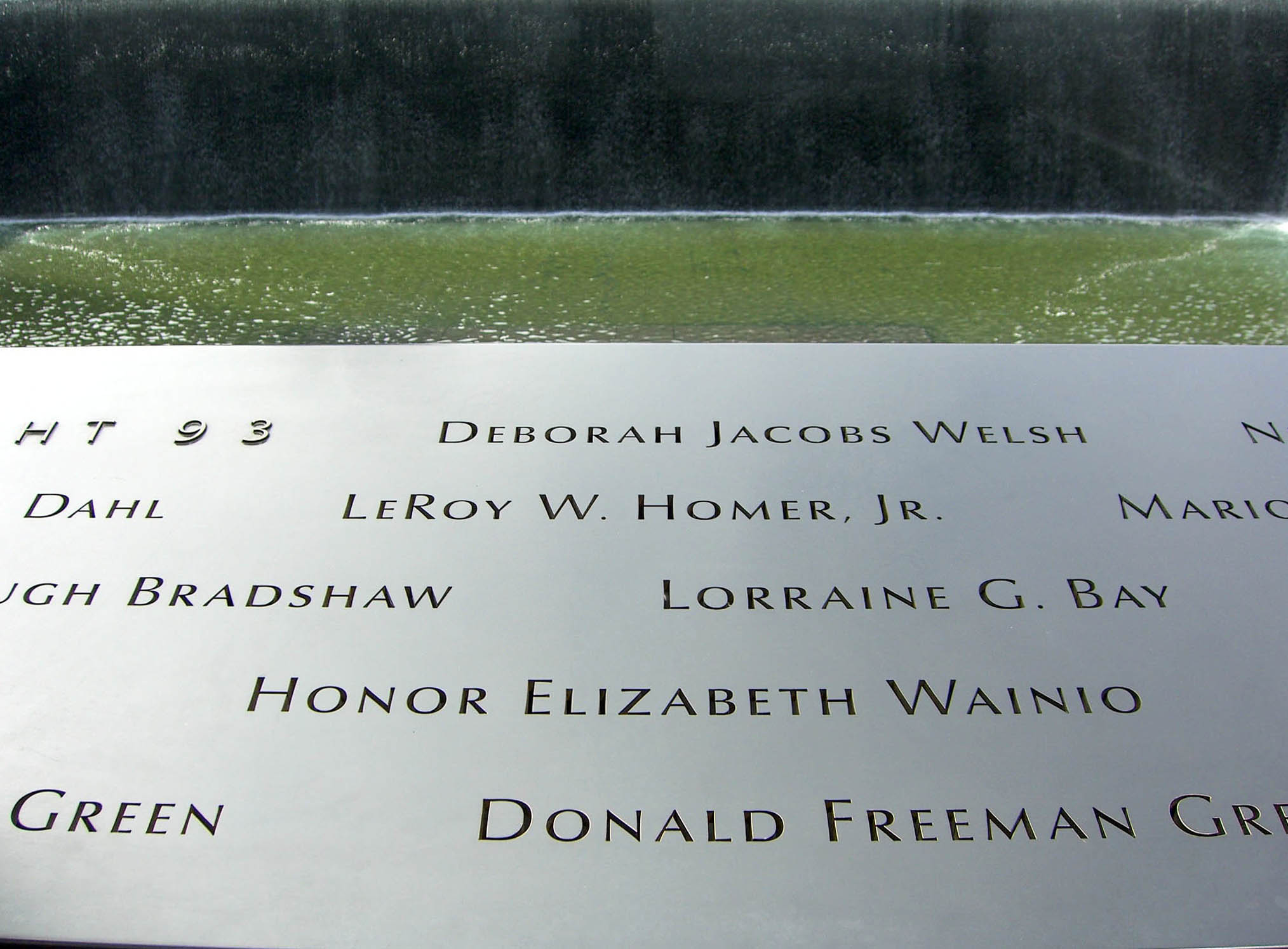
Homer's name is located on Panel S-67 of the National September 11 Memorial's South Pool, along with those of other passengers and crew of Flight 93.

Homer, son of a West German woman and an American soldier who was stationed in West Germany, grew up on Long Island in New York. He was one of nine children, and seven of his siblings were girls. As a child, he assembled model airplanes, collected aviation memorabilia and read books on aviation. Whenever the family held events where men weren't invited, his father would take him to McArthur Airport where they would watch the planes takeoff and land. He was 15 years old when he started flight instruction in a Cessna 152. Working part-time jobs after school to pay for flying lessons, he completed his first solo trip at the age of 16 and obtained his private pilot's certificate in 1983. Homer graduated from Ss. Cyril and Methodius School in 1979 and St. John the Baptist Diocesan High School in 1983.

== Career and personal life ==
He entered the United States Air Force Academy as a member of the class of 1987. As an upperclassman, he was a member of Cadet Squadron 31. He graduated on May 27, 1987, and was commissioned as a second lieutenant in the U.S. Air Force.

After completing his USAF pilot training in 1988, he was assigned to McGuire Air Force Base in New Jersey, flying a Lockheed C-141 Starlifter. While on active duty, he served in the Gulf War and later supported operations in Somalia. He received many commendations, awards and medals during his military career. In 1993, he was named the Twenty-First Air Force "Aircrew Instructor of the Year". Homer achieved the rank of captain before his honorable discharge from active duty in 1995 and his acceptance of a reserve commission in order to continue his career as an Air Force officer.

Homer continued his military career as a member of the U.S. Air Force Reserve, initially as a C-141 instructor pilot with the 356th Airlift Squadron at Wright-Patterson Air Force Base in Ohio, then subsequently as an Academy Liaison Officer, recruiting potential candidates for both the Air Force Academy and the Air Force Reserve Officer Training Corps. During his time in the Air Force Reserve, he achieved the rank of major.

Homer continued his flying career by joining United Airlines in May 1995. He briefly worked as a flight engineer, before becoming a First Officer on the Boeing 757/Boeing 767 in 1996, where he remained until his death.

Homer married his wife, Melodie, on May 24, 1998, and his daughter, Laurel, was born in late November 2000. They resided together in the Marlton of Evesham Township, New Jersey.

== United Flight 93 ==
On September 11, 2001, Homer was flying with Captain Jason M. Dahl on United Airlines Flight 93 from Newark, New Jersey, to San Francisco. The plane was hijacked by four al-Qaeda terrorists, as they carried out the September 11 attacks. Homer and Dahl struggled with the hijackers, which was transmitted to Air Traffic Control.

After learning of the earlier crashes at the World Trade Center and the Pentagon, the crew and passengers attempted to foil the hijacking and reclaim the aircraft. Given the uprising of crew and passengers, and knowing they would not make it to their intended target, which was the US Capitol, the hijackers instead chose to crash the plane into a field near Shanksville, Pennsylvania.

Homer received many awards and citations posthumously, including honorary membership in the historic Tuskegee Airmen; the Congress of Racial Equality's Dr. Martin Luther King Jr. Award; the Southern Christian Leadership Conference Drum Major for Justice Award; and the Westchester County Trailblazer Award.

He is survived by his wife, Melodie, and his only child, daughter Laurel. Other family members include his mother, seven sisters, and his brother. His widow Melodie Homer established the LeRoy W. Homer Jr. Foundation, which awards scholarships related to aviation.

At the National 9/11 Memorial, Homer Jr. is memorialized at the South Pool, on Panel S-67, along with other crew and passengers on Flight 93.

On May 7, 2021, United States Air Force Academy's graduating class of 2024 named Homer Jr as the class Exemplar, an honor that academy's graduating class has bestowed every year since 2000 upon the individual who "exemplifies" the type of person the cadets wish to emulate.

== See also ==
- John Ogonowski
- Charles Burlingame
