= Anne Emlen Mifflin =

Quaker minister and activist in early America

Anne Emlen Mifflin (April 30, 1755 - March 22, 1815) was a Quaker minister, abolitionist, and social reformer in the late 18th and early 19th centuries. Bryn Mawr has a collection of her papers including a diary.

She was a member of the Emlen family in Philadelphia, daughter of George and Ann Emlen. Her brother James Emlen was a signatory to the Treaty of Canadaigua in 1794.

She was married to Warner Mifflin in 1788, after his first wife died in 1786. They travelled together and convinced the Society of Friends to allow African Americans full fellowship. They had sons Samuel E. and Lemuel. After Warner Mifflin's death she travelled, preached and was involved in Quaker education and missions to American Indians. She left her two boys in the care of her mother.

She died March 22, 1815, and her will of 1811 left her estate to her two sons.

== See also ==
- Joshua Evans
- Granville Sharp
- Thomas Mifflin
