= Tom Knight (American football) =

American football player (born 1974)

No. 22, 24
- Position: Cornerback

Personal information
- Born: December 29, 1974 (age 51); Summit, New Jersey, U.S.
- Listed height: 6 ft 0 in (1.83 m)
- Listed weight: 202 lb (92 kg)

Career information
- High school: Cherokee (Marlton, New Jersey)
- College: Iowa
- NFL draft: 1997: 1st round, 9th overall pick

Career history
- Arizona Cardinals (1997–2001); New England Patriots (2002)*; Baltimore Ravens (2002–2003); Tampa Bay Buccaneers (2004)*; St. Louis Rams (2004)
- * Offseason or practice squad member only

Awards and highlights
- Second-team All-Big Ten (1996)

Career NFL statistics
- Tackles: 248
- Interceptions: 3
- Sacks: 2.5
- Stats at Pro Football Reference

Thomas Knight (born December 29, 1974) is an American former professional football player who was a cornerback in the National Football League (NFL). He was selected by the Arizona Cardinals in the first round of the 1997 NFL draft. He also played for the Baltimore Ravens.

Knight played at Cherokee High School in the Marlton section of Evesham Township, New Jersey and was selected all-South Jersey. Knight received a full scholarship from Iowa to play football in 1991.

== Professional career ==
The Arizona Cardinals selected Knight in the first round (ninth overall) of the 1997 NFL draft. He was the third cornerback selected, following Shawn Springs (third overall) and Bryant Westbrook (fifth overall).

On July 17, 1997, the Arizona Cardinals signed Knight to a three–year, $8.22 million rookie contract that included a signing bonus of $3.74 million.

== NFL career statistics ==
Legend
**Bold**	Career high

Year	Team	Games		Tackles				Interceptions				Fumbles			
Year	Team	GP	GS	Comb	Solo	Ast	Sck	Int	Yds	TD	Lng	FF	FR	Yds	TD
1997	ARI	15	14	47	41	6	0.0	0	0	0	0	0	0	0	0
1998	ARI	8	5	33	30	3	**1.0**	0	0	0	0	**1**	0	0	0
1999	ARI	16	11	**65**	**56**	**9**	0.0	**2**	16	0	16	0	0	0	0
2000	ARI	16	15	56	48	8	**1.0**	0	0	0	0	0	0	0	0
2001	ARI	8	8	31	27	4	0.0	1	**43**	0	**43**	0	0	0	0
2003	BAL	10	1	16	16	0	0.5	0	0	0	0	0	**1**	0	0
Career		73	54	248	218	30	2.5	3	59	0	43	1	1	0	0
