= Ambassador's Daughter =

The Ambassador's Daughter is a 1956 film featuring Olivia de Havilland and John Forsythe.

The Ambassador's Daughter or Ambassador's Daughter may also refer to:

- The Ambassador's Daughter, a 1913 short film starring Miriam Nesbitt, George Lessey and Robert Brower, directed by Charles Brabin
- Ambassador's Daughter, a 1958 memoir by Meriel Buchanan
- The Ambassador's Daughter, a 2013 novel by Pam Jenoff
- Sefirin Kızı (Turkish: The Ambassador's Daughter, a 2019 Turkish TV show
- "The Ambassador's Daughter", an episode of the 1971 TV series Monty Nash
