= Dennis Norman =

American football player (born 1980)

No. 68, 62, 64
- Position: Offensive lineman

Personal information
- Born: January 26, 1980 (age 46); Marlton, New Jersey, U.S.
- Listed height: 6 ft 5 in (1.96 m)
- Listed weight: 313 lb (142 kg)

Career information
- High school: Cherokee (Marlton)
- College: Princeton
- NFL draft: 2001: 7th round, 222nd overall pick

Career history
- Seattle Seahawks (2001–2004); Jacksonville Jaguars (2004–2008); San Diego Chargers (2009)

Awards and highlights
- 3× First-team All-Ivy League (1998–2000)

Career NFL statistics
- Games played: 64
- Games started: 24
- Fumble recoveries: 1
- Stats at Pro Football Reference

Dennis M. Norman (born January 26, 1980) is an American former professional football player who was a guard in the National Football League (NFL). He was selected by the Seattle Seahawks in the seventh round of the 2001 NFL draft. He played college football for the Princeton Tigers.

Norman has also played for the Jacksonville Jaguars and San Diego Chargers.

== Early life ==
Norman attended Cherokee High School in the Marlton section of Evesham Township, New Jersey and was a good student and a letterman in football, basketball, and track & field. As a student, he was a member of the National Honor Society and was a National Merit Scholar. In track&field, he was a three-year letterman and an All-South Jersey selection. Norman graduated from Cherokee High School in 1997.

== College career ==
He was a three-year letterwinner at Princeton University. Norman was named first-team All-Ivy League his final three seasons. He started 26 of 29 career games played and is one of only four players to be named All-Ivy League three times. He was also a member of the track and field team, and ranks 5th all-time for the school in the discus with a throw of 175'11"

== Professional career ==
=== Seattle Seahawks ===
Norman was selected in the 2001 NFL draft by the Seattle Seahawks. He was the only tackle and the sixth player overall ever drafted from Princeton.

Norman played nearly four seasons with the Seahawks before being waived on October 15, 2004.

=== Jacksonville Jaguars ===
Norman was signed by the Jacksonville Jaguars on December 7, 2004. He was released on September 8, 2009, after the team signed offensive lineman Kynan Forney.

=== San Diego Chargers ===
Norman was signed by the San Diego Chargers on September 16, 2009. After the 2009 season Norman was not re-signed.
