= LeRoy W. Homer Jr. Foundation =

American educational foundation

- Formation: 2002
- Type: Nonprofit organization
- Headquarters: Marlton, NJ, United States
- President: Melodie Homer
- Revenue: $57,588 (2019)
- Expenses: $34,308 (2019)
- Website: www.leroywhomerjr.org

The LeRoy W. Homer Jr. Foundation is a national 501(c)(3) non-profit organization founded in memory of First Officer LeRoy W. Homer Jr. LeRoy Homer was the co-pilot of United Airlines Flight 93, which crashed in Shanksville, Pennsylvania on September 11, 2001. The organization is based Marlton, New Jersey and is operated on an all-volunteer basis which allows donated funds to be used for the foundation’s programs. The foundation's board consists of six individuals who are aviators, friends and/or family members of LeRoy Homer, or volunteers. The foundation has two honorary board members, Soledad O’Brien and Emily Warner.

== History ==
The foundation was founded in 2002 by Melodie Homer, the wife of LeRoy Homer. The Foundation was established to provide support and encouragement to young adults with an interest in aviation and to help them pursue professional flight instruction leading to certification as a private pilot. Aviation scholarships are awarded on a yearly basis to young adults through an application process. The scholarship application window is every year from November 1s until January 31. Applications are reviewed by a scholarship committee of Foundation board members. Once an individual is selected as a scholarship recipient, flight training is expected to be completed the same year.

Since The Foundation began in 2002, twenty-five scholarships have been granted. All twenty-five recipients have received their private pilot license.

All but one individual is working in the field of aviation as follows:

Seventeen individuals have graduated from four year programs with degrees including aeronautical engineering, aeronautical science, aviation, flight technology, and aviation business, cyber security and cyber engineering. Eight students are currently completing their undergraduate degrees. Most recipients have achieved additional ratings – instrument, complex, commercial single & multi-engine, airline transport pilot (ATP) and certified flight instructor (CFI.)

Two past recipients are graduates of the US Naval Academy and three graduates of the US Air Force Academy, two are presently completing their studies at the US Air Force Academy. The Foundation’s scholarship recipients fly FA-18s in the US Navy, C-135 and C-17s in the US Air Force, F-15 in the Air National Guard, MD-11 for Western Global Airlines, MD-88 for Delta Air Lines and 737 for American Airlines.

== Key Performance Indicators ==
- By the numbers (as of 12/5/2020):
- 100% of scholarship recipients have received their private pilot's certification
- 40% of scholarship recipients are women
- 64% of scholarship recipients are minorities
- 40% of scholarship recipients are/were professional pilots
- 40% of scholarship recipients are/were military aviators
- 100% of scholarship recipients have or are in the process to obtain a college education
- 25 scholarships have been awarded and funded
- The foundation has been in operation since 2002
