= Freedom Fuel =

Network of American gas stations

- Trade name: Freedom Fuel Network
- Type: Private
- Industry: Oil and gas
- Founded: July 2026
- Area served: Michigan; New Jersey; Pennsylvania
- Services: Gasoline retailing Convenience stores
- Website: freedomfuelnetwork.com

Freedom Fuel (also known as the Freedom Fuel Network) is a network of American gas stations operating under a common retail brand in Michigan, New Jersey and Pennsylvania that sells gas at a discounted rate.

== History ==
Freedom Fuel was launched in June 2026 and began operating stations as an initiative to combat rising gas prices during the 2026 Iran war. It attracted national attention after U.S. President Donald Trump publicly promoted the network for selling gasoline at prices substantially below prevailing market prices.

The stations initially offered fuel for $3.47 per gallon as a nod to Trump as the 47th President of the United States, though some network gas stations quickly raised prices to $3.57. Subsequent reporting identified Baltimore Ravens assistant coach Randy Brown and former commodities trader Yoni Gontownik, both of New Jersey, as the signatories to the company's certificate of formation, and Shamikh and Syed Kazmi, also of New Jersey, as controlling most of its locations. The Kazmis have been accused of selling stolen fuel.

In September 2026 operations commenced in Michigan.

== Background ==
The United States experienced elevated gasoline prices following disruptions to global petroleum markets associated with the Iran war and uncertainty surrounding shipping through the Strait of Hormuz. Although gasoline prices had declined from their peak earlier in the conflict, they remained well above pre-war levels as the Independence Day holiday approached, when record numbers of Americans were expected to travel by automobile during the opening celebrations of the United States Semiquincentennial. In June 2026, President Trump accused major oil companies of price gouging by failing to reduce retail gasoline prices in line with declining crude oil prices. He directed the United States Department of Justice to investigate possible misconduct in the petroleum industry, identifying ExxonMobil, Chevron, Shell, and BP as being among the companies whose pricing practices he questioned.

== Ownership ==
Freedom Fuel Network gas station in Millbourne, Pennsylvania

Freedom Fuel Network, LLC was incorporated in Delaware on June 23, 2026. The company was reported to have filed an application for trademark registration with the United States Patent and Trademark Office on July 1, 2026, to register the Freedom Fuel Network trademark for automotive service stations and convenience stores. The application listed a Delaware registered-agent address, while the attorneys who filed the application declined to identify the company's owners or principals. Politico later reported that Baltimore Ravens assistant coach Randy Brown and former commodities trader Yoni Gontownik were the signatories to the company's certificate of formation.

The company had 25 locations as of July 2026, and by late August said it operated 29.

According to the Associated Press, 14 stations are "controlled by companies linked to Shamikh and Syed Kazmi", brothers and New Jersey businessmen. Eight locations are leased directly to Shamikh Kazmi from Blue Owl Capital, which told reporters it was not involved in operations.

== Lawsuits, fines, and investigations ==
The Kazmis were previously found liable for stealing 230,000 gallons of fuel from a supplier in 2021—a federal judge in February 2026 ordered them to pay $600,000 to the supplier, and as of July the supplier had not received payment. Syed Kazmi was ordered in 2024 to pay $380,000 to 7-Eleven over mismanagement of a franchise that included the disappearance of "tens of thousands of dollars" of loaned cigarettes. Shamikh Kazmi was found in contempt of court in 2022 for refusing a court order to remove BP signage from a gas station after BP cut ties with him. Shamikh was held liable in January 2026 for failing to pay over $700,000 in rent at 17 Florida gas stations.

In May 2026, the New Jersey Department of Environmental Protection levied a US$ 429,900 penalty against 17 gas stations managed by the Kazmis. In July 2026, the New Jersey Attorney General said that it was investigating the Freedom Fuel Network "to ensure that they are compliant with State law."

In August 2026, Mansfield Oil Company filed suit in the United States District Court for the Eastern District of Pennsylvania alleging that New Jersey businessman Syed Kazmi and his company KRSM Inc. had taken more than a million gallons of fuel, worth nearly US$4 million, from a terminal at Twin Oaks, Pennsylvania between late May and early July 2026 without paying for it. The complaint states that "KRSM was able to sell such fuel for such low prices and garner such publicity because it never paid Plaintiff for such fuel". A lawyer for Mansfield told The Washington Post that some of the fuel was supplied to at least ten Pennsylvania stations listed on the Freedom Fuel Network website; the suit does not name the network or its stations as defendants or accuse them of wrongdoing. A lawyer for Kazmi and KRSM said his clients denied the allegations and described the matter as "an account dispute over fuel invoices, mis-priced by Mansfield"; in a filing of 25 August Kazmi said he "did not agree that the amounts Mansfield demanded were correct or owing". The judge subsequently ordered Kazmi and KRSM to maintain at least US$2.75 million in a bank account. A White House official said the administration had "zero contact or dealings" with Kazmi and KRSM. A person described by Politico as familiar with the Freedom Fuel business said that Kazmi and KRSM were "not associated with the Freedom Fuel Network in any capacity".

== Business model ==
A Freedom Fuel Network gas station in Egg Harbor Township, New Jersey in August 2026 (formerly Sunoco). The $3.79 price per gallon on regular fuel was below rate for comparable New Jersey stations, which charged around $4.00–$4.09 per gallon.

Freedom Fuel describes itself as a network of independently owned service stations that continue operating under local ownership while participating in the Freedom Fuel brand, typified by an eagle logo and American flag colors and iconography. As of July 2026, the network consisted of 20 stations in Pennsylvania and five in New Jersey. Reports have differed regarding the network's ownership structure. The company's website describes Freedom Fuel as a network of independently owned stations operating under a common brand, and ABC News reported that the participating stations appeared to be independently owned based on its review of public records and station histories, while Time reported that a White House official claimed that the company owned all 25 locations.

Freedom Fuel began selling regular gasoline at approximately US$3.479 per gallon during early July 2026, about 50 cents below prevailing retail prices, and below estimated wholesale acquisition costs. The company did not publicly explain how it was able to offer fuel at those prices, and did not respond to media requests seeking comment. The network's discounted pricing and corporate structure have been the subject of extensive media coverage. The White House has stated that Freedom Fuel is a privately owned company that has received no government funding or subsidies and that its lower gasoline prices reflect reduced profit margins. Industry analysts cited by multiple news organizations have questioned whether the advertised prices could be sustained profitably under prevailing wholesale fuel costs. Within a few days after its launch, it was reported that prices had begun to diverge from the originally advertised price of US$3.47 per gallon. According to GasBuddy price data cited by The Hill, most of the network's 25 locations were charging at least $3.57 per gallon by July 10, 2026, although the stations generally continued to offer gasoline at prices below those of nearby competitors. A White House spokesperson stated that gasoline prices at Freedom Fuel locations would fluctuate according to market conditions and local circumstances, and suggested that prices could decline further depending on the market and individual station.

Philadelphia Democrats criticized the network as a publicity stunt that would not bring real fuel cost relief. Democratic Congressman Jim McGovern of Massachusetts suggested that the gas stations were being subsidized by the Trump Administration with government funds, comparing them to the public grocery stores proposed by New York Mayor Zohran Mamdani, which the second Trump Administration had criticized as socialism.
