= Brian Brikowski =

American gridiron football player (born 1989)

Profile
- Position: Defensive end/Linebacker

Personal information
- Born: February 11, 1989 (age 37); Freehold Township, New Jersey, U.S.
- Listed height: 6 ft 4 in (1.93 m)
- Listed weight: 265 lb (120 kg)

Career information
- High school: Freehold Township (NJ)
- College: Monmouth
- NFL draft: 2010: undrafted

Career history
- Lehigh Valley Steelhawks (2011); Cleveland Gladiators (2012–2013); Chicago Rush (2013); Cleveland Gladiators (2014–2016); Montreal Alouettes (2014–2015); Albany Empire (2018–2019)

Career CFL statistics
- Tackles: 15
- Sacks: 3
- Stats at CFL.ca (archived)

Career AFL statistics
- Tackles: 84.5
- Sacks: 10.5
- Forced fumbles: 3
- Stats at ArenaFan.com

Brian Brikowski (born February 11, 1989) is an American former football defensive end and linebacker. Brikowski was a member of the Montreal Alouettes of the Canadian Football League (CFL) until his release in June 2015. Brikowski has previously played for the Chicago Rush in the Arena Football League (AFL). Brikowski also played for the Lehigh Valley Steelhawks of the Indoor Football League (IFL).

== Early life ==
Brikowski attended Freehold Township High School in Freehold, New Jersey, and was a letterman in basketball, football, track & field, and lacrosse. Brikowski signed with the Akron Zips of the Mid-American Conference as a Redshirt (college sports) and did not play during his tenure. A semester later, Brikowski transferred to play for the Monmouth Hawks.

== Professional career ==
=== Lehigh Valley Steelhawks ===
In 2011, Brikowski played for the Lehigh Valley Steelhawks of the Indoor Football League. Brikowski was second place in the IFL Rookie of the Year voting, despite playing less than half of a season. Brikowski led the Lehigh Valley Steelhawks in sacks during his time with the team.

=== Cleveland Gladiators ===
Brikowski's play in the IFL helped him earn a spot with the Cleveland Gladiators of the Arena Football League in 2012. Brikowski has received notable achievements, being named "the player who made the biggest impact on the defensive front for the Gladiators by ESPN Cleveland." Brikowski returned to the Gladiators in 2013.

=== Chicago Rush ===
On May 15, 2013, Brikowski was traded to the Chicago Rush in exchange for Joe Phinisee and Jacob Hardwick. Following a fold from the team, Brikowski became a free agent and later choose to sign with the Cleveland Gladiators.

=== Cleveland Gladiators ===
On February 21, 2014, Brikowski signed with the Cleveland Gladiators. Brikowski played only 9 of the Cleveland Gladiators historic 17–1 record before signing with the Montreal Alouettes.

=== Montreal Alouettes ===
On May 31, 2014, Brikowski announced via Twitter that he had signed with the Montreal Alouettes of the Canadian Football League. On July 31, 2014, Brikowski was activated from the practice squad to the playing roster. On June 20, 2015, the Montreal Gazette reported that Brikowski had been release from the team.

=== Cleveland Gladiators ===
Brikowski, for the third time, rejoined the Cleveland Gladiators after his release from the Montreal Alouettes.

=== Montreal Alouettes ===
Brikowski was signed to the Montreal Alouettes's practice roster on August 30, 2015.

=== Albany Empire ===
Brikowski was assigned to the Albany Empire on July 5, 2018. On April 15, 2019, Brikowski was assigned to the Empire. He was placed on recallable reassignment two days later.
