= Bill Osborn =

American football player (born 1966)

Bill Osborn (born c. 1966) is a former American football player who attended the University of Pittsburgh and played in the National Football League, World League and the Arena Football League. Osborn has also worked as an NFL scout, a color analyst and an executive in the medical device industry.

He has worked at Vicis, Inc., a company creating a new football helmet called the ZERO1.

== Amateur career ==
Osborn attended the University of Pittsburgh where he went on to play three varsity sports – football, basketball and baseball. While at Pitt, he became the first athlete since Mike Ditka to earn a letter in all three varsity sports. He was awarded nine varsity letters at Pitt – four each in football and baseball, and one in basketball. He finished his college football career in the top-10 all-time receiving list at the University of Pittsburgh. As a member of the Pitt basketball team, Osborn was part of the 1986-87 Big East Conference championship team.

Osborn grew up in Wildwood Crest, New Jersey, and attended Wildwood High School, where he was dubbed "The Wizard of Oz" by a radio announcer. Osborn is one of the most highly respected athletes to emerge from southern New Jersey. Osborn won 11 varsity sports letters at Wildwood High, where he graduated in 1984. He won all-league first-team honors nine times, and is the only person to win first-team all CAL, all four years in baseball playing three different positions. He also won all-state honors in football and baseball, and scored 1140 points in basketball.

In 1990, Osborn was named the 1980s and 1990s South Jersey Male High School Athlete of the Decade and a core part of Wildwood High School's football tradition by The Press of Atlantic City, and was selected to the All Decade baseball and football In November 1996, he was inducted into the school's Basketball Hall Of Fame and his high school #12 was officially retired in 1999 by the Wildwood Board of Education.

== Professional football career ==
Osborn played professionally in the National Football League for the Philadelphia Eagles. He also played for the Barcelona Dragons of the World League and in the Arena Football League with the Pittsburgh Gladiators (now the Tampa Bay Storm). As a WR/LB for the Gladiators in 1990 he caught 11 passes for 159 yards and made 3 interceptions. After retiring because of head and neck injuries, Osborn became a scout for the Kansas City Chiefs for two years

== Broadcast career ==
Post football, Osborn began a broadcast career that has spanned 28 years. During that time, he's worked with ESPN Radio, Comcast, Fox Sports Net, WABC-NYC radio and 610WIP Philadelphia Sports Talk Radio. He was a pre-game, post-game and color analyst for the Big East and also University of Pittsburgh Football Network from 1995-2003, as well as the color analyst for the Philadelphia Soul of the Arena Football League. He also served as the color analyst for Comcast/CN8 regional college game of the week, and as an Arena Football League color analyst for the National Game of the week on the Versus Network for the 2008 season. Osborn has served as the Color Analyst for the Arena Football League's Philadelphia Soul on Comcast's Sports Net Central TV and their Radio Partner's since the inception of the franchise. He also is the co-host of "Ozzie & Krausey", a weekly sports talk show heard in the Philadelphia/South Jersey market on WIP-FM 610Sports ESPN Radio. Bill is also the Color Analyst for the American Indoor Football League's Philadelphia Yellow Jackets, which had their inaugural season in 2016. He rejoined the 2016 Pitt Panther broadcast team, returning as color analyst for the 2016 and 2017 seasons.

== Biography ==
Osborn and his two sons, live in the Marlton section of Evesham Township, New Jersey. Osborn, who first consulted with Vicis before coming on board as a full-time employee in Spring 2015 and served as VP of Business Development for Vicis, a company developing a new football helmet 'ZERO1' which was designed to better mitigate impact forces compared to traditional helmets; the 2018 version of Vicis’ ZERO1 helmet ranked No. 1 atop the NFL's 2018 Helmet Laboratory Testing Performance Results.

He has been president of the Bill Osborn Foundation, which focuses on colon cancer awareness and raises money for underprivileged children through a celebrity golf tournament in his father's name, run in partnership with the Sand Barrens Golf Club & Cape Regional Medical Center in Cape May County. Most recently, he held the position of Director, National Accounts for Medtronic Inc., a Fortune 50 company and medical device industry leader. He worked 15 years for Medtronic. Prior to that, he worked six years for Ethicon Inc., a division of Johnson & Johnson. In August 2017, Osborn was selected to the Board of Governors of the Maxwell Football Club, which has honored excellence in all level of football since 1935.
