= Evesham Township School District =

School district in Burlington County, New Jersey, US

Address
- 25 South Maple Avenue Evesham Township, Burlington County, New Jersey, 08053; United States
- Coordinates: 39.789268°N 74.929253°W

District information
- Grades: Pre-K to 8
- Superintendent: Justin Smith
- Business administrator: John Recchinti
- Schools: 8

Students and staff
- Enrollment: 4,384 (as of 2021–22)
- Faculty: 348.0 FTEs
- Student–teacher ratio: 12.6:1

Other information
- District Factor Group: I
- Website: www.evesham.k12.nj.us
Ind.	Per pupil	District spending	Rank (*)	K-8 average	%± vs. average
1A	Total Spending	$17,108	39	$18,891	−9.4%
1	Budgetary Cost	13,485	36	14,159	−4.8%
2	Classroom Instruction	8,582	43	8,659	−0.9%
6	Support Services	1,988	39	2,167	−8.3%
8	Administrative Cost	1,237	9	1,547	−20.0%
10	Operations & Maintenance	1,481	39	1,612	−8.1%
13	Extracurricular Activities	77	31	104	−26.0%
16	Median Teacher Salary	61,500	46	61,136
Data from NJDoE 2014 Taxpayers' Guide to Education Spending. *Of K-8 districts with more than 750 students. Lowest spending=1; Highest=84

The Evesham Township School District is a comprehensive public school district serving students in pre-kindergarten through eighth grade from Evesham Township in Burlington County, in the U.S. state of New Jersey.

As of the 2021–22 school year, the district, comprising eight schools, had an enrollment of 4,384 students and 348.0 classroom teachers (on an FTE basis), for a student–teacher ratio of 12.6:1.

The district is classified by the New Jersey Department of Education as being in District Factor Group "I", the second-highest of eight groupings. District Factor Groups organize districts statewide to allow comparison by common socioeconomic characteristics of the local districts. From lowest socioeconomic status to highest, the categories are A, B, CD, DE, FG, GH, I and J.

Public school students in ninth through twelfth grades attend Cherokee High School, which opened a 210,000-square-foot (20,000 m^{2}) addition in September 2001. As of the 2021–22 school year, the high school had an enrollment of 2,165 students and 174.9 classroom teachers (on an FTE basis), for a student–teacher ratio of 12.4:1. The high school is part of the Lenape Regional High School District, which also serves students from Medford Lakes, Medford Township, Mount Laurel Township, Shamong Township, Southampton Township, Tabernacle Township and Woodland Township.

== History ==
Florence V. Evans Elementary School, which served grades K-5, was closed in June 2017, in the wake of declining enrollment in the district.

== Schools ==
Schools in the district (with 2021–22 enrollment data from the National Center for Education Statistics) are:

Elementary schools

- Helen L. Beeler Elementary School with 544 students in grades K-5
- Frances S. DeMasi Elementary School with 283 students in grades K-5
  - Beverly Green, principal
- Robert B. Jaggard Elementary School with 452 students in grades K-5
- Marlton Elementary School with 430 students in grades K-5
- Richard L. Rice Elementary School with 559 students in grades PreK-5
- J. Harold Van Zant Elementary School with 573 students in grades K-5

Middle schools

- Frances S. DeMasi Middle School with 732 students in grades 6-8
  - Beverly Green, principal
- Marlton Middle School with 772 students in grades 6-8
  - Gary Hoffman, principal

== Administration ==
Core members of the district's administration are:

- Justin Smith, superintendent
- John Recchinti, business administrator and board secretary

== Board of education ==
The district's board of education, comprised of nine members, sets policy and oversees the fiscal and educational operation of the district through its administration. As a Type II school district, the board's trustees are elected directly by voters to serve three-year terms of office on a staggered basis, with three seats up for election each year held (since 2012) as part of the November general election. The board appoints a superintendent to oversee the district's day-to-day operations and a business administrator to supervise the business functions of the district.

== 2021 Marlton Middle School bathroom incident ==
On December 17, 2021, the superintendent reported that antisemitic graffiti was found in the boys' bathroom stalls, including two swastikas, the phrase "Hitler was right", and a stick-figure depiction of a dead Jew. An investigation was launched, with promises of punitive and rehabilitative action made.
