= Randy Brown (politician) =

American politician (born 1967)

Mayor of Evesham Township, New Jersey
- In office 2007–2018
- Succeeded by: Jaclyn Veasy

Personal details
- Born: Randy Scott Brown; July 30, 1967 (age 59) Evesham Township, New; Jersey, U.S.
- Party: Republican
- Spouse: Trisha Brown
- Education: Catawba College (BA)
- Football career

Baltimore Ravens
- Title: Senior special teams assistant

Career information
- Position: Kicker
- High school: Cherokee (Evesham Township, New Jersey)
- College: Catawba

Career history
- Chicago Bears (1998–2000) Kicking consultant; Chattanooga (2003) Kicking consultant; Philadelphia Eagles (2004–2005) Kicking consultant; Baltimore Ravens (2008–2023) Kicking consultant; Baltimore Ravens (2024–2025) Special teams assistant; Baltimore Ravens (2026-present) Senior special teams assistant

Awards and highlights
- Super Bowl champion (XLVII)

Randy Scott Brown (born July 30, 1967) is an American politician who is the former mayor of Evesham Township. Brown is also a National Football League special teams coach for the Baltimore Ravens. Prior to consulting for the Baltimore Ravens, Brown served as a kicking coach for the Chicago Bears and the Philadelphia Eagles. Brown has been succeeded by Jaclyn Veasy.

== Football career ==
Brown was named an All-State, All-County and All Conference football player at Cherokee High School before his college career at Catawba College in North Carolina. At Catawba College he was named Academic All-American and second team NAIA All-American as a place kicker. Brown was the all-time leading scorer in Catawba football history with 234 points and was the holder of 10 scoring and kicking records, however all records have since been broken. Brown graduated in 1989 with a degree in journalism. In 2009, Brown was inducted to Catawba's hall of fame.

Brown and Ravens head coach John Harbaugh have been friends since the late 1990s. Since that time, Brown worked with Harbaugh for the Eagles in 2004 and 2005 and again, with the Ravens, beginning in 2008. Brown has coached in three AFC Championship games. He has coached Pro Bowl kickers Justin Tucker, Billy Cundiff and David Akers, along with Pro Bowl punters Sam Koch and Todd Sauerbrun. Harbaugh has been quoted in the Wall Street Journal, calling Brown the "foremost kicking coach in the country". Brown won his first Super Bowl title when the Ravens defeated the San Francisco 49ers in Super Bowl XLVII.

== Political career ==
Brown formerly served as mayor of Evesham Township, New Jersey. Brown was elected in 2007, re-elected in 2010 and again in 2014. Brown announced in September 2018 that he would not seek re-election for another term.

Brown was an executive board member with the New Jersey Conference of Mayors and served on the executive board of the New Jersey League of Municipalities.

In July 2026, Brown and former commodities trader Yoni Gontownik were identified as signatories to the certificate of formation of Freedom Fuel, a network of gas stations touted by the Trump Administration as selling gasoline at rates substantially below the market rate. Subsequent reporting by Politico Magazine further detailed the venture's political origins and financial backing.
