= Mike Devlin (American football) =

American football player and coach (born 1969)

Personal information
- Born: November 16, 1969 (age 56); Blacksburg, Virginia, U.S.
- Listed height: 6 ft 2 in (1.88 m)
- Listed weight: 325 lb (147 kg)

Career information
- Position: Offensive lineman (No. 62)
- High school: Cherokee (Marlton, New Jersey)
- College: Iowa
- NFL draft: 1993: 5th round, 136th overall pick

Career history

Playing
- Buffalo Bills (1993–1995); Arizona Cardinals (1996–1999)

Coaching
- Arizona Cardinals (2000–2003) Assistant offensive line coach; Toledo (2004–2005) Offensive line coach; New York Jets (2006–2012) Tight ends coach; New York Jets (2013–2014) Offensive line coach; Houston Texans (2015–2020) Offensive line coach; Baltimore Ravens (2022–2023) Assistant offensive line coach; Los Angeles Chargers (2024–2025) Offensive line coach

Awards and highlights
- First-team All-American (1992); Second-team All-American (1991); Big Ten Offensive Lineman of the Year (1992); First-team All-Big Ten (1991); 2× Second-team All-Big Ten (1990, 1992)

Career NFL statistics
- Games played: 101
- Games started: 27
- Fumble recoveries: 2
- Stats at Pro Football Reference

Michael Richard Devlin (born November 16, 1969) is an American former professional football player and coach. He most recently served as the offensive line coach for the Los Angeles Chargers of the National Football League (NFL).

== Early life ==
Devlin attended Cherokee High School in the Marlton section of Evesham Township, New Jersey and was a letterman in football. Devlin played for the second-best high school football team in New Jersey, losing The Star-Ledger Trophy to the number one team and USA Today top five ranked Union High School Farmers. Devlin would later start with two Union Farmers at the University of Iowa, running back Tony Stewart and Offensive Guard Mike Ferroni.

== Professional career ==
Devlin was selected by the Buffalo Bills in the fifth round of the 1993 NFL draft after playing college football as an interior lineman with the Iowa Hawkeyes.

He played 58 career games over a span of seven years in the NFL. During his three-year stint with the Buffalo Bills, he played on special teams and at center and guard, backed up All-Pro Kent Hull, and made an appearance in Super Bowl XXVIII. On March 8, 1996, Devlin signed with the Arizona Cardinals. During his time there, he was part of the starting lineup at center in all but two of twenty-six games. Devlin retired from playing after the 1999 season.

== Coaching career ==
In 2000, he became a quality control coach for the Cardinals, before becoming an assistant offensive lineman coach. During the 2004–2005 seasons, Devlin served as offensive line coach for the Toledo Rockets. In 2006, Devlin became the tight ends coach for the New York Jets. He was promoted to offensive line coach on February 5, 2013.

Devlin left the Jets to accept the same position with the Houston Texans on January 9, 2015 to Coach the offensive line under Bill O'Brien. Devin was let go after the 2020 season.

In 2022 he became the assistant offensive line coach for the Baltimore Ravens.

On February 14, 2024, Devlin was named as the offensive line coach for the Los Angeles Chargers.

On January 13, 2026, Devlin was fired by the Chargers, one day after the Charges' offensive line allowed six sacks in the 16–3 Wild Card Round loss to the New England Patriots.
