= Tevrin Brandon =

American football player (born 1990)

Profile
- Position: Defensive back

Personal information
- Born: December 9, 1990 (age 35); Bethlehem, Pennsylvania
- Listed height: 5 ft 10 in (1.78 m)
- Listed weight: 180 lb (82 kg)

Career information
- High school: Bethlehem Catholic High School
- College: Connecticut (2009-2011); Monmouth (2012-2013)
- NFL draft: 2014: undrafted

Career history
- Brooklyn Bolts (2014); Kansas City Chiefs (2014)*; Denver Broncos (2015)*; Hamilton Tiger-Cats (2015–2016)
- * Offseason or practice squad member only

Tevrin Brandon (born 1990) is an American former football cornerback in the Canadian Football League (CFL) and National Football League (NFL). He signed in 2015. He played college football at Connecticut before transferring to Monmouth and was signed by the Kansas City Chiefs as an undrafted free agent in 2014.

== Early life ==
Brandon attended Bethlehem Catholic High School in Bethlehem, Pennsylvania, where he played varsity football and track. Brandon was a state medalist in the 100-meter dash in both his junior and senior years, and was named All-Conference and All-State in the 100-meter dash. In his senior year, Brandon was a part of Bethlehem Catholic's state championship 4x100 meter relay team.
