= Ss. Cyril and Methodius School =

- Deer Park, New York

Information
- Type: Parish School/Parochial School
- Religious affiliation: Roman Catholic
- Patron saints: St. Cyril and St. Methodius
- Principal: S. Susan Snyder
- Teaching staff: 19 (as of 2010)
- Grades: Pre-K - 8th
- Website: www.sscmweb.org

The School of Ss. Cyril and Methodius is an elementary/primary parochial located in Deer Park, New York. The school was the inspiration of the Father James J. Behan, the first formal pastor of the adjoining church of the same name, Ss. Cyril and Methodius. It opened in September 1962, staffed initially by the Sisters of Saint Joseph from Brentwood, New York. The Sisters were associated with the original mission church in Deer Park when they instructed Sunday school. The Mission of Ss. Cyril and Methodius consecrated its first sanctuary in 1934, receiving its patrons by settlers to the area of Slovak origins.

The first graduates of the school who continued their education at Catholic high schools attended Seton Hall High School - Patchogue, St. Anthony's - Smithtown, Chaminade - Uniondale, St. Joseph's - Brentwood and Holy Family - Huntington.

Famous alumni include LeRoy Homer, the co-pilot of United Airlines Flight 93, and C. J. Ramone.
