= Maybe an Artist =

2022 graphic memoir of Liz Montague

- Author: Liz Montague
- Illustrator: Montague
- Language: English
- Genre: Children's literature; Graphic novel; Memoir
- Publisher: Random House Studio, New York
- Publication date: October 18, 2022
- Publication place: United States
- Pages: 176
- ISBN: 978-0-593-30781-6

Maybe an Artist, a Graphic Memoir is a memoir written and illustrated by Liz Montague and published by Random House Studio. In it, Montague tells about the difficulties she went through as a teen with dyslexia, her usage of art as a way to communicate her feelings and how eventually had her cartoons published on The New Yorker.

== Reception ==
The School Library Journal praised the memoir's cover, noting its similarity to Norman Rockwell's Triple Self-Portrait and saying it "grabs [the reader's] attention right away." While the reviewer believed the pacing to be slow "until it ends quickly," they overall appreciated how it depicts someone young with dyslexia using art to express themselves and how it felt "poignant but ultimately sweet and uplifting." Publishers Weekly gave the book a starred review and called it "an inspiring journey of self-discovery, self-expression, and self-love."

Kirkus Reviews praised Montague's writing and art saying she "maintains a youthful voice throughout" and noting how it is matched by the "soft color palette and clean white background." They conclude by calling it "[a] delightful combination of text and images delivered with humor and heart." The Booklist' reviewer called Montague's art "simple and flat," and compared the way characters express themselves through "eye rolls" to that of Mo Willems' pigeon character, saying it "works beautifully with the tone of the book." They concluded by saying that "this will speak to many readers who feel like they aren't being heard."
