= Stephen Livingstone Baldwin =

American missionary (1835–1902)

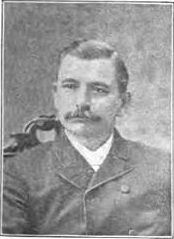
- Missionary to China
- Born: Stephen Livingstone Baldwin; January 11, 1835; Somerville, Somerset, New Jersey
- Died: July 28, 1902 (aged 67); Brooklyn, New York
- Spouse: Esther E. Baldwin

Rev. Stephen Livingstone Baldwin (simplified Chinese: 保灵; traditional Chinese: 保靈; Pinyin: Bǎolíng; Foochow Romanized: Bō̤-lìng; January 11, 1835 – July 28, 1902) was an American missionary to China by the Methodist Episcopal Church. His ministerial life covered a period of forty-four years, half of which was spent at Fuzhou.

== Biography ==
Stephen Livingstone Baldwin was born in Somerville, Somerset, New Jersey on January 11, 1835. He graduated at Concord Biblical Institute (modern-day Boston University) in 1858. The same year he was appointed a missionary to China under the auspices of the Methodist Episcopal Church. He arrived at Shanghai with Mrs. Baldwin in the latter part of 1858, and proceeded forthwith to his station at Fuzhou, which he reached early in 1859. In the beginning of 1861, he left with his family for the United States on account of Mrs. Baldwin's health, but she died on the voyage. Baldwin married again in America, and the next year, he was at Fuzhou again with his second wife, Esther E. Baldwin, remaining till 1870. Upon his return to the United States, he held several pastorates, and was for the last 14 years of his life, recording secretary of the Missionary Society of the Methodist Episcopal Church. In 1900, he published Foreign Missions of the Protestant Churches. Baldwin died of typhoid fever on July 28, 1902, in Brooklyn, New York.
