= Liz Montague =

American cartoonist

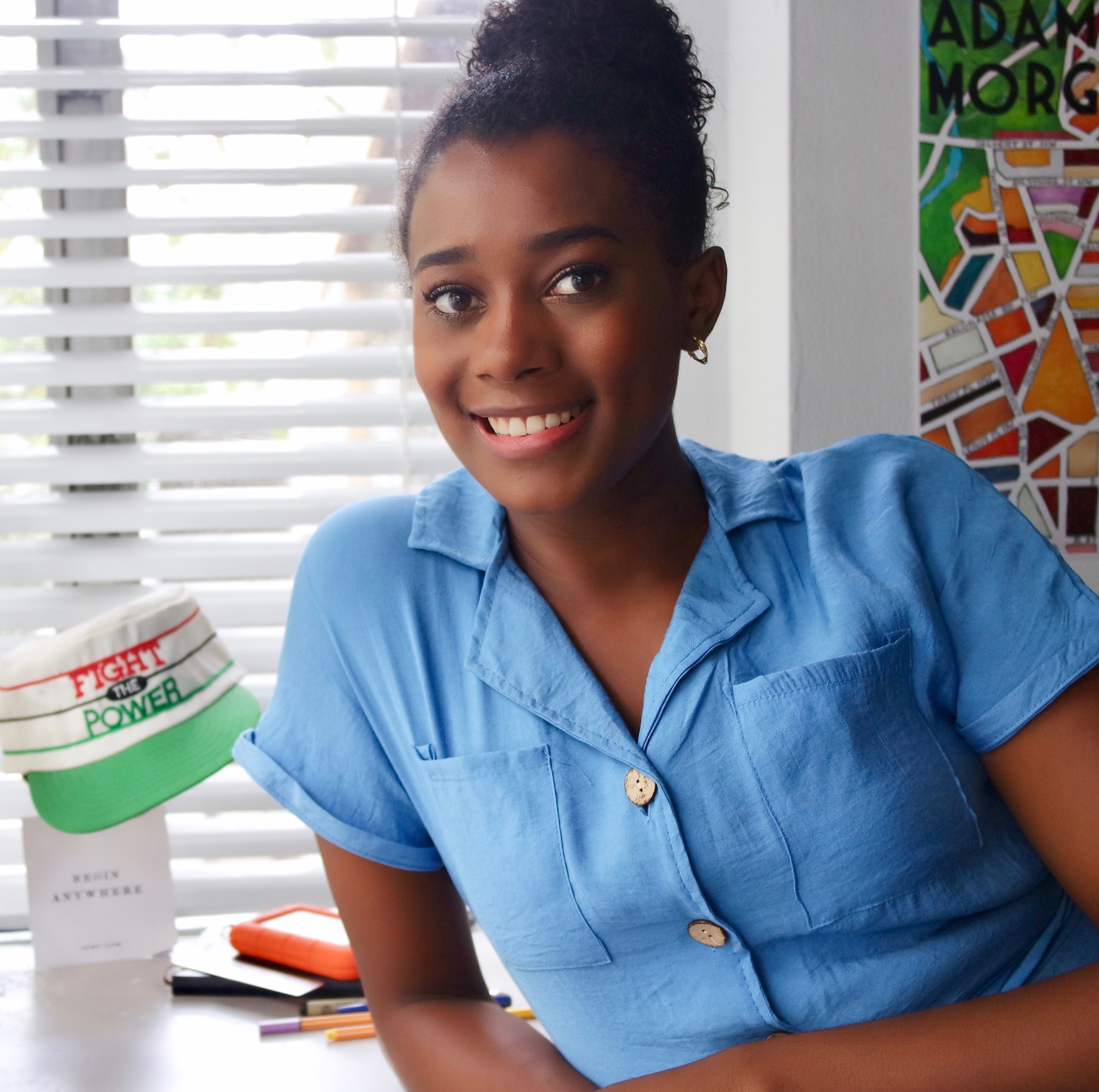
- Born: Elizabeth Montague
- Areas: Cartoonist, Writer, Artist
- Notable works: The New Yorker cartoons (2022)

Elizabeth Montague, an American cartoonist, is one of the first Black cartoonists to have her work published in The New Yorker.

== Early life ==
Montague's parents are an architect and an executive. Raised in the Marlton section of Evesham Township, New Jersey, Montague attended Cherokee High School in Marlton, where she was a three-season varsity athlete competing in indoor and outdoor track and volleyball. Montage attended University of Richmond in Virginia on a track scholarship. She credits the time management skills she learned competing at a high level in sports and balancing schoolwork with her success in comic writing. Montague graduated from University of Richmond with a degree in visual and media arts practice.

== Career ==
After graduating from University of Richmond, Montague worked at Aga Khan Foundation in Washington, D.C. as a digital storyteller and design associate. Montague created the biographic cartoon series, Liz at Large during her sophomore year of college. The cartoon is published weekly in The Washington City Paper. In Fall of 2022 Random House will publish Montague's graphic novel memoir, Maybe an Artist.

== The New Yorker ==
"I never saw myself really in the cartoons because they were all white." Montague wrote a letter to The New Yorker expressing concern over the lack of cartoonists of color in its publication. When asked who she’d recommend as a cartoonist, she named herself. She is the second Black female cartoonist to be featured in the magazine and one of the youngest.

== Recognition ==
- 2018 recipient of the David C. Evans Award for Outstanding Achievement in Creative Arts at University of Richmond.
- Created a Google Doodle honoring Jackie Ormes on September 1, 2020.
- Montague was one of 18 Black and BIPOC artists selected by the USTA for an art installation in Arthur Ashe Stadium for the 2020 US Open.
- Montague illustrated and storyboarded the video Your Vote Matters for the Joe Biden For President Campaign.
