= Doug Easlick =

American football player (born 1980)

No. 42
- Position: Fullback

Personal information
- Born: December 4, 1980 (age 45); Mount Holly, New Jersey, U.S.

Career information
- High school: Cherokee
- College: Virginia Tech

Career history
- Miami Dolphins (2004); Cincinnati Bengals (2004-2005)*; San Francisco 49ers (2006)*; Pittsburgh Steelers (2006)*
- * Offseason or practice squad member only

Career statistics
- Receptions: 1
- Receiving yards: 4
- Stats at Pro Football Reference

Doug Easlick (born December 4, 1980) is an American former professional football player who was a fullback in the National Football League (NFL) for the Miami Dolphins in 2004.

After playing at Cherokee High School and playing college football for the Virginia Tech Hokies, Easlick played for the Miami Dolphins and Cincinnati Bengals.

As of November 2016, Easlick works for Graham Company, located in Philadelphia.
