= Jessica Woodard =

American shot putter

Personal information
- Nationality: American
- Born: February 4, 1995 (age 31) Starkville, MS

Sport
- Sport: Track and field
- Event: Shot put
Medal record
NACAC Championships
Silver medal – second place	2022 Freeport	Shot put
Bronze medal – third place	2025 Freeport	Shot put

Jessica Woodard (born February 4, 1995) is an American track and field athlete who competes in shot put.

== Early life ==
Raised in the Marlton section of Evesham Township, New Jersey, Woodard attended Cherokee High School in New Jersey. She attended the University of Oklahoma and was an NCAA Outdoor First Team All-American in 2018, as well as Big 12 champion both indoor and outdoor in 2018.

== Career ==
Woodard finished third at the 2022 USA Outdoor Track and Field Championships throwing 19.40m. At the 2022 World Athletics Championships in Eugene, Oregon Woodard was one of three home athletes who reached the final of the women's shot put with a throw of 19.08. Woodard finished in eighth place at the World Championships behind compatriot gold medalist Chase Ealey and ahead of Minnesotan Maggie Ewen in ninth.

She finished eighth in the shot put at the 2024 Diamond League event 2024 Meeting International Mohammed VI d'Athlétisme in Rabat.

Woodard competed in the shot put at the 2026 USA Indoor Track and Field Championships in New York, placing fourth overall.
