= Cherokee High School (New Jersey) =

High school in Burlington County, New Jersey, US

Location
- 120 Tomlinson Mill Road; Evesham Township, Burlington County, New Jersey 08053; United States; 39.8742°N 74.8975°W

Information
- Type: Public high school
- Established: 1975
- School district: Lenape Regional High School District
- Superintendent: Matthew D. Webb
- NCES School ID: 340849001092
- Principal: Donna Charlesworth
- Faculty: 155.0 FTEs
- Enrollment: 2,082 (as of 2024–25)
- Student to teacher ratio: 13.4:1
- Campus: Suburban
- Colors: { Brown, orange, and White
- Athletics conference: Olympic Conference (general); West Jersey Football League (football)
- Team name: Chiefs
- Rival: Shawnee High School
- Accreditation: Middle States Association of Colleges and Schools
- Publication: The Scribe
- Newspaper: The Scout
- Yearbook: Talking Leaves
- Television: Cherokee Digital Media, LDTV
- Website: cherokee.lrhsd.org

Cherokee High School is a four-year comprehensive public high school, serving students in ninth through twelfth grades as one of four high schools of the Lenape Regional High School District in Burlington County, in the U.S. state of New Jersey. The communities in the district are Evesham Township, Medford Lakes, Medford, Mount Laurel, Shamong Township, Southampton Township, Tabernacle Township and Woodland Township. Cherokee serves students from Evesham Township. The school, located in the Marlton section of Evesham Township, has been accredited by the Middle States Association of Colleges and Schools Commissions on Elementary and Secondary Schools since 1978 and is accredited until July 2028.

As of the 2024–25 school year, the school had an enrollment of 2,082 students and 155.0 classroom teachers (on an FTE basis), for a student–teacher ratio of 13.4:1. There were 279 students (13.4% of enrollment) eligible for free lunch and 72 (3.5% of students) eligible for reduced-cost lunch.

== History ==
With overcrowding at both Lenape High School (with 2,400 students) and Shawnee High School (1,600) requiring split sessions, voters approved a December 1972 referendum to construct a third high school with a capacity of 1,500 students that would be built on the same model as Shawnee. The ballot item was approved by a 55-45% margin, with voters in favor in the townships of Evesham, Medford and Mount Laurel, while it was rejected in Medford Lakes and the townships of Shamong, Southampton and Tabernacle.

With district enrollment up to nearly 5,000, Cherokee High School opened in September 1975 with 750 students in grades 9 and 10. The school was constructed at a cost of $7 million (equivalent to $41.9 million in 2025) on a site in Evesham Township covering 71 acres (29 ha).

The school was known as simply Cherokee High School until the opening of the 210,000 square feet (20,000 m^{2}) "South" building in September 2001 for 1,150 students in grades 9–10, which was constructed at a cost of $26.4 million (equivalent to $48.0 million in 2025), at which time the original building was renamed as "Cherokee High School North." In 2018, with the retirement of the South principal, Leonard Iannelli, Cherokee eliminated the position, effectively merging the North and South building into one school.

== Awards, recognition and rankings ==
The school was the 80th-ranked public high school in New Jersey out of 339 schools statewide in New Jersey Monthly magazine's September 2014 cover story on the state's "Top Public High Schools", using a new ranking methodology. The school had been ranked 157th in the state out of 328 schools in 2012, after being ranked 134th in 2010 out of 322 schools listed. The magazine ranked the school 152nd in 2008 out of 316 schools. The school was ranked 131st in the magazine's September 2006 issue, which surveyed 316 schools across the state. Schooldigger.com ranked the school tied for 86th out of 381 public high schools statewide in its 2011 rankings (an increase of 30 positions from the 2010 ranking) which were based on the combined percentage of students classified as proficient or above proficient on the mathematics (87.9%) and language arts literacy (97.0%) components of the High School Proficiency Assessment (HSPA).

== Athletics ==
The Cherokee High School Chiefs participate in the Olympic Conference, which is comprised of public and private high schools located in Burlington and Camden counties, and operates under the supervision of the New Jersey State Interscholastic Athletic Association. With 1,616 students in grades 10–12, the school was classified by the NJSIAA for the 2019–20 school year as Group IV for most athletic competition purposes, which included schools with an enrollment of 1,060 to 5,049 students in that grade range. The football team competes in the Continental Division of the 94-team West Jersey Football League superconference and was classified by the NJSIAA as Group V South for football for 2024–2026, which included schools with 1,333 to 2,324 students.

The football team has a rivalry with Shawnee High School that was listed at 22nd on NJ.com's 2017 list "Ranking the 31 fiercest rivalries in N.J. HS football". Cherokee leads the rivalry with a 28-17-1 record as of 2017.

Basketball championships

- Sectional champions: South Jersey Group IV – 2007, defeating Winslow Township High School 54–43. and 2010, defeating Shawnee High School 56–43.
- Group IV champions: 2010, defeating Plainfield High School 52-38 for the program's first state title.

Girls field hockey championships

- State sectional titles: South Jersey Group IV – 1997

Football championships

- State champions: South Jersey Group III – 1981 (finished 11-0 after a 15–8 win vs. Deptford Township High School), 1982 (finished undefeated after a 24–15 win vs. Eastern Regional High School); South Jersey Group IV – 1985 (finishing 11-0 after a 16–0 win vs. Pennsauken High School), 1990, 1993 (won 16-6 vs. Washington Township High School), 2005 (finished 10-2 after a 32–25 overtime win against Absegami High School, after trailing 14-0), 2009 (won 14–0 vs. Egg Harbor Township), 2010 (33–6 win over Oakcrest); South Jersey Group V – 2013, 2014; Central Jersey Group V – 2019 (won 35–18 vs. Kingsway Regional High School)
- Undefeated Seasons: 1981, 1982, 1985 (11-0), 2010 (12-0)

Boys soccer

- New Jersey Group IV state champion 2000 (defeating Clifton High School in the tournament final), 2010 (vs. Hunterdon Central Regional High School), 2011 (vs. Bridgewater-Raritan High School) and 2022 (vs. West Orange High School).

Baseball

- 1985 New Jersey Group IV champions, defeating Elizabeth High School in the finals to finish the season with a record of 23–2 and South Jersey Group IV Champions, ranked 15th in nation by USA Today
- 2005 South Jersey Group IV champion, with a 13–1 win vs. Washington Township High School

Softball championships

- State champion: Group III – 1980 (defeating Hanover Park High School 8–1 in the tournament final), 1983 (vs. Ramsey High School); Group IV – 1984 (vs. Union High School), 1988 (vs. Westfield High School), 1994 (finishing 24-5 after a 6–0 win vs. West Milford High School), 1996 (with a record of 27-2 after an 11–1 win in six innings vs. Montclair High School), 2001 (finishing 30-3 after a 5–1 win vs. Belleville High School) and 2003 (finished 28-0 after winning 1–0 in extra innings vs. West Milford). The school's eight softball group championships are the most of any public school in the state. NJ.com / The Star-Ledger ranked Cherokee as their number-one softball team in the state in 1996, 2001 and 2003.
- Undefeated seasons: 2003

Cross country

Girls

- Nike North East Regionals 2021 – 1st, 2023 – 9th
- Meet of Champions 2004 - 8th, 2010 - 6th, 2020 - 5th, 2021 - 1st, 2023 9th
- Group IV state champions 2021
- South Jersey Group IV sectional champions 2003, 2020, 2021, 2023

Boys

- Meet of Champions: 1997–2000, 2007, 2019, 2022 and 2024; the program's eight state titles are ranked 10th in the state
- Group IV state champions: 1997, 1998, 1999, 2000, 2007
- South Jersey Group IV sectional champions: 1988, 1997, 1998, 1999, 2000, 2007, 2011, 2016

Girls lacrosse

- New Jersey Group IV state champions: 2008 (vs. Bridgewater-Raritan High School in the tournament final) and 2022 (vs. Westfield High School)

== Administration ==
The school's principal is Donna Charlesworth. Her core administration team includes eight assistant principals.

== Notable alumni ==
- Jay Black (born 1976, class of 1994), stand-up comic and screenwriter
- Randy Brown (born 1967), politician who was the mayor of Evesham Township and had served as a kicking coach for the Chicago Bears, Philadelphia Eagles, and the Baltimore Ravens
- Mike Devlin (born 1969, class of 1988), NFL football player/coach now with the Houston Texans as the offensive line coach
- Doug Easlick (born 1980), NFL fullback who played for the Miami Dolphins and Cincinnati Bengals
- Jeff Gallo, college football coach and former player who is the head coach for the Monmouth Hawks football team
- Christina Grimmie (1994–2016), YouTube celebrity and season 6 contestant on Team Adam on The Voice
- Brian Herzlinger (born 1976, class of 1994), filmmaker, My Date with Drew
- Pam Jenoff (born 1971, class of 1989), author of Quill award-nominated The Kommandant's Girl
- Dana Kelly, reality TV star, A Double Shot at Love
- Tom Knight (born 1974, class of 1992), NFL football player Arizona Cardinals, New England Patriots, St. Louis Rams, Tampa Bay Buccaneers
- Liz Montague, cartoonist, who was one of the first Black cartoonists to have her work published in The New Yorker
- Brit Morgan (born 1987, class of 2005), actress who has portrayed Debbie Pelt in the HBO series True Blood
- Dennis Norman (born 1980), former NFL football player with the San Diego Chargers
- Christine O'Hearn (born 1969, class of 1987), lawyer who served as a United States district judge of the United States District Court for the District of New Jersey
- Jessica O'Rourke (born 1986), professional football manager and former midfielder and defender
- Ray Rizzo (born 1992), pro-gamer, three-time Pokémon Video Game World Champion and first American to win the Pokémon Video Game World Championship
- Richard Ruccolo (born 1972), actor, Two Guys, a Girl, and a Pizza Place
- Donna Scheuren, politician who represents the 147th district in Pennsylvania House of Representatives
- Michael Schoeffling (born 1960), actor / model who appeared in the 1984 film Sixteen Candles
- Nicole Wood (born 1970, class of 1988), Miss April 1993 Playboy Playmate
- Jessica Woodard (born 1995), track and field athlete who competes in shot put

== Other schools in the district ==
Other schools in the district (with 2023–24 enrollment data from the National Center for Education Statistics) are:

- Lenape High School - located in Medford, with 1,922 students from Mount Laurel
- Seneca High School - located in Tabernacle Township, with 1,018 students from Shamong, Southampton, Tabernacle and Woodland Townships
- Shawnee High School - located in Medford, with 1,418 students from Medford and Medford Lakes
