= Blaine Neal =

American baseball player (born 1978)

- Relief pitcher
- Born: April 6, 1978 (age 48); Marlton, New Jersey, U.S.
- Batted: Left Threw: Right

MLB debut
- September 3, 2001, for the Florida Marlins

Last MLB appearance
- June 15, 2005, for the Colorado Rockies

MLB statistics
- Win–loss record: 5-4
- Earned run average: 5.08
- Strikeouts: 93
- Stats at Baseball Reference

Teams
- Florida Marlins (2001–2003); San Diego Padres (2004); Boston Red Sox (2005); Colorado Rockies (2005)
Medals
Men's baseball
Representing United States
Olympic Games
| Bronze medal – third place | 2008 Beijing | Team |

Blaine Neal (born April 6, 1978) is an American former professional baseball relief pitcher. Neal played with the Florida Marlins (2001–2003), San Diego Padres (2004), Boston Red Sox (2005), and Colorado Rockies (2005) of Major League Baseball (MLB). He bats left-handed and throws right-handed.

== Life and career ==
Neal was born in Marlton, New Jersey and grew up in Haddon Heights, New Jersey. He attended St. Rose of Lima school in Haddon Heights New Jersey. He attended Bishop Eustace Preparatory School in Pennsauken, New Jersey and graduated in 1996. Although bothered by elbow problems throughout his high school career, Neal made a strong impression with a fastball that topped out at 93 miles per hour (150 km/h) and an ERA of 0.92. Virginia Commonwealth University offered him a full scholarship to play baseball, but Neal signed with the Florida Marlins, who picked him in the fourth round of the 1996 MLB draft and gave him a $400,000 signing bonus. Neal later got married in 2003 to Kerissa Neal and had 3 kids Charlie, Casey, and Kaytlynn.

=== Florida Marlins ===
Neal spent the 1996 and 1997 seasons with the Rookie-level Gulf Coast Marlins but managed just seventeen appearances over those two seasons as his elbow continued to bother him. The Marlins sent Neal to the Low-A Utica Blue Sox in 1998 and attempted to convert him into a first baseman: in 53 games Neal batted just .190. His elbow felt better, and after the season underwent arthroscopic surgery. The surgery apparently worked: assigned to the Single-A Kane County Cougars for the 1999 season, Neal went 4–2 with a 2.32 ERA and six saves. After playing in the California Fall League, Neal spent 2000 with the High-A Brevard County Manatees, where he posted a 2.15 ERA with 11 saves.

The Marlins promoted Neal to the Double-A Portland Sea Dogs for the 2001 where he continued to impress, recording 21 saves with an ERA of 2.36. In late August the Marlins recalled him to a spot on their expanded roster; Neal made his major league debut on September 3, 2001 in relief against the Chicago Cubs. Neal last 1 1/3 innings and gave up two runs on three hits. Neal made four appearances overall with an ERA of 11.82. Neal split the 2002 season between the Triple-A Calgary Cannons and the Marlins. In Calgary he worked as a closer and recorded 11 saves with a 2.90 ERA. Up with the Marlins he worked out of the bullpen, and finished the season with a 3–0 record and a 2.73 ERA. On the four transitions between Calgary and Miami, Marlins assistant general manager Jim Fleming commented: "He went back and forth between clubs, and that's a tough way to pitch. But he's had a solid year."

Neal began 2003 with the Marlins but spent much of the year with the Triple-A Albuquerque Isotopes after a rocky start in April in which his ERA ballooned to 8.38 in nine appearances. At Albuquerque Neal went 3–2 with a 2.33 ERA and 21 saves, but continued to struggle in the majors. On a return to the team in September his first pitch was hit into the stands in Veterans Stadium for a grand slam by Mike Lieberthal, and Neal finished the year with an 8.14 ERA. In an interview Neal acknowledged his difficulties: "I got off to a bad start and I panicked, and they panicked...I had a couple of opportunities, but I didn't take advantage."

At the start of the 2004 season the Marlins traded Neal to the San Diego Padres for starter Ben Howard. In parts of three seasons with Florida Neal compiled a 3–0 record with an ERA of 5.57.

=== San Diego Padres ===
Neal arrived in the San Diego organization ready for a change of scenery; after a lackluster spring training with the Marlins, with whom he had to that point spent his entire professional career, he felt that he had little future there: "I wasn't throwing much toward the end of camp, and I knew I wasn't going to make the club." Assigned to the Portland Beavers, San Diego's Triple-A team, Neal regained his control and added a changeup to his pitching repertoire. The Padres called Neal up in June in place of Brandon Puffer. Manager Bruce Bochy praised Neal's turnaround in Portland: "[Neal] was throwing the ball well down there...He has a power arm." Neal remained with the Padres through the end of the season, appearing in 40 games with an ERA of 4.07.

Although Neal enjoyed playing in San Diego, a rocky spring training contributed to his eventual departure. In competition with Steve Sparks and Randy Williams for a final spot in the bullpen, Neal posted a 6.43 ERA. With Neal out of options, the Padres risked losing him had they attempted to send him back to the minors, so they traded him to the Boston Red Sox for outfielder Adam Hyzdu.

=== Boston Red Sox ===
Neal joined the Red Sox immediately and made a total of eight appearances, posting an 0–1 record with an ERA of 9.00. On May 8, 2005, just five weeks after acquiring Neal from the Padres, the Red Sox designated him for assignment. The Colorado Rockies claimed him off waivers. In an odd twist of fate Randy Williams, his former teammate in San Diego and with whom he had competed for a spot in the bullpen, had himself been waived by the Padres and then claimed by Colorado. In retrospect Boston sportswriter Steve Buckley criticized the trade which had brought Neal to the Red Sox, calling it typical of general manager Theo Epstein:"[the] barely-talked-about Blaine Neal-type acquisition."

=== Colorado Rockies ===
Neal made 11 appearances for the Rockies but his right elbow began bothering him again, and he went on the 60-day disabled list. Once he came off the DL the Rockies outrighted him to the Triple-A Colorado Springs Sky Sox, where he made one appearance before the season ended, at which point Colorado released him. In his career at Colorado he posted a 1–2 record with an ERA of 6.14.

=== Around the minors ===
On January 9, 2006, Neal signed with the St. Louis Cardinals, but was released during spring training. Neal signed with the Pittsburgh Pirates on May 22, 2006 and pitched for the Double-A Altoona Curve, but became a free agent after the season ended. During the 2007 season, Neal pitched for the Toronto Blue Jays Triple-A affiliate, the Syracuse Chiefs. Neal signed with the Detroit Tigers for the 2008 season and pitched for the Triple-A Toledo Mud Hens. Working as the team's closer, he went 1–0 with a 1.21 ERA and 26 saves. Mud Hens manager Larry Parrish gave Neal a vote of confidence: "To me, he has enough stuff to get back to the major leagues."

On July 16, 2008, Neal was named to the United States national baseball team for the 2008 Summer Olympics. He became a free agent at the end of the 2008 season and signed a minor league contract with the Philadelphia Phillies on December 17, 2008. Neal was released by the Phillies at the end of spring training. On May 11, 2009 Neal signed a minor league deal with the Cleveland Indians and joined the Triple-A Columbus Clippers.

== Personal life ==
Blaine is married and has three kids. He is currently living a quiet life in southern New Jersey.
