= Esther E. Baldwin =

American missionary and teacher

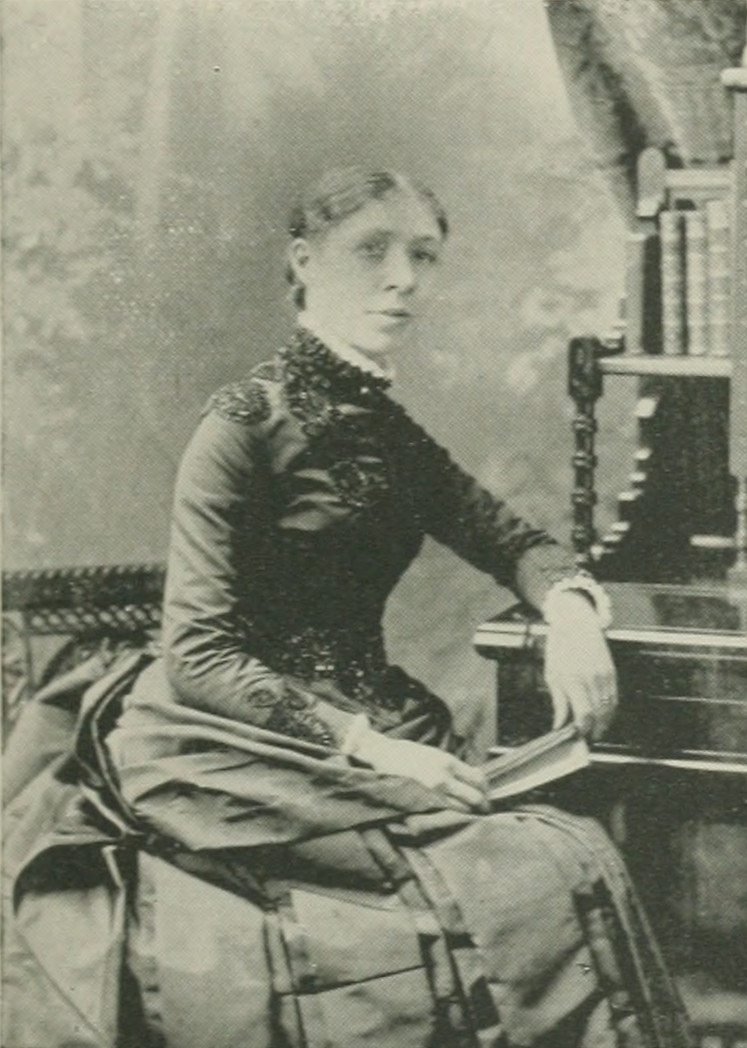
- Photo in A Woman of the Century
- Born: Esther E. Jerman; November 8, 1840; Marlton, New Jersey, U.S.
- Died: February 26, 1910 (aged 69); Brooklyn, New York, U.S.
- Education: Pennington Seminary
- Occupations: missionary, teacher, translator, writer, editor
- Spouse: Stephen Livingstone Baldwin (m. 1862; died 1902)
- Writing career
- Pen name: Mrs. S. L. Baldwin
- Language: English
- Notable works: Must the Chinese Go?; The Chinese Question

Esther E. Baldwin (née, Jerman; pen name, Mrs. S. L. Baldwin; November 8, 1840 – February 26, 1910) was an American missionary, teacher, translator, writer, and editor of the long nineteenth century. Baldwin served as president of the New York Woman's Missionary Society for two decades. Known as the "Chinese Champion", she understood the religious and political problems of China, and the Chinese people, as perhaps no other woman in the U.S. did at that time. She labored constantly to bring about a better understanding between the two nations.

== Early life and education ==
Esther E. Jerman was born in Marlton, New Jersey, November 8, 1840. Her father, the Rev. Mathias Jerman, was for many years a member of the New Jersey Annual Conference of the Methodist Episcopal Church. In her youth, Esther was frail, sensitive and studious. She became a Christian at the age of ten, and united with the church of her parents.

Her first schooling was received at home. She also received instruction in public schools and at a private school in Salem, New Jersey, followed by a full course in Pennington Seminary, New Jersey. She was graduated from that institution in 1859, or 1860, taking the highest honors.

== Career ==
In 1860, she became a teacher of higher mathematics, Latin and French in a seminary in Virginia. At the beginning of the Civil War her sympathies were with the North, and she resigned her position and returned home.

In the summer of 1861, she met the Rev. Stephen Livingstone Baldwin, of the Fuzhou Mission, then at home on furlough, and in April, 1862, they were married, and sailed for China the following June, arriving in November, after five months at sea. Besides her domestic responsibilities, she was soon entrusted with the supervision of several day schools and of a class of Bible women who were sent out to read the Bible to their country-women. In her thoughtful survey of the condition of woman and childhood in China, quickened by her personal observation and experience, she became deeply impressed with the need of educated Christian woman physicians. She saw that through this means, access and confidence could be gained and the way opened for missionary work. She was the first to ask for a medical woman to be sent to China. When the hospital for women and children was opened in Fuzhou, the first for such a purpose founded in that empire, she gave it her attention. For several years, she translated the Berean Lessons into the Chinese language for the use of the Methodist Mission and of the American Board. For two years, she edited in the same language the Youth's Illustrated Paper. She saw the missions grow from small beginnings into strong churches.

After eighteen years of this work, she became gravely ill, and her physician declared that a change of climate and entire rest were essential to recovery. The American pulpit was freely open to Dr. Baldwin, and his pastonal services were eagerly sought. For some years, he was the recording secretary of the Board of Missions of the M. E. Church. Mrs. Baldwin's health was largely restored since her return to the U.S. where she was extensively employed in the interests of the Woman's Foreign Missionary Society, being president for two decades of the New York branch of that society in the Methodist Episcopal Church; of the Woman's Christian Temperance Union; in lectures on various subjects; and in many charities. She was an ardent advocate of the equality of women with men, both in the State and in the Church.

The "Chinese question" in all its aspects had her sympathies. The misrepresentation and abuse of the Chinese kindled her indignation. She was called to speak before large audiences in many places on the "Chinese question" and contributed numerous articles on the subject to various city papers. She carefully collected and forcibly stated both the laws and the facts bearing on the subject, and published them in a volume entitled Must the Chinese Go? which had three editions. She won the distinction of being the "Chinese Champion."

Baldwin was one of the ablest debaters of the Methodist Episcopal Church. She spoke at Chautauqua in the early 1880s.

== Personal life ==
Baldwin was the mother of seven children, six of whom were born in Fuzhou, and two of whom died there. She died suddenly at the family home in Brooklyn, New York, February 26, 1910.

== Selected works ==
The Chinese book of etiquette and conduct for women and girls, entitled, Instruction for Chinese women and girls, by Lady Tsao; tr. from the Chinese by Mrs. S. L. Baldwin, 1900

- The Chinese Question: By the One Who Has Found a Home in China for Nearly 20 Years, and Claims to Know the People, 1882
- Must the Chinese Go?: An Examination of the Chinese Question, 1886
- The Chinese book of etiquette and conduct for women and girls, entitled, Instruction for Chinese women and girls, by Lady Tsao; tr. from the Chinese by Mrs. S. L. Baldwin, 1900
