= Jeff Gallo =

American football player and coach

Current position
- Title: Head coach
- Team: Monmouth
- Conference: CAA
- Record: 8–3

Biographical details
- Born: South Jersey, U.S.
- Education: Monmouth University

Playing career
- 2000–2003: Monmouth
- Position: Offensive guard

Coaching career (HC unless noted)
- 2005–2006: Monmouth (assistant)
- 2007–2018: Monmouth (TE)
- 2019–2025: Monmouth (OC/TE)
- 2026–present: Monmouth

Head coaching record
- Overall: 8–3

Accomplishments and honors

Championships
- CAA (2026)

Jeffrey Gallo is an American college football coach and former player who is the head coach for the Monmouth Hawks football team in West Long Branch, New Jersey. He was named the second head coach in the program's history on December 11, 2025, succeeding his longtime mentor Kevin Callahan. Prior to his promotion, Gallo served on the Monmouth coaching staff for over 20 seasons, including seven seasons as the team's offensive coordinator.

== Playing career ==
Raised in the Marlton section of Evesham Township, New Jersey, Gallo attended Cherokee High School, where he earned All-State honors as a defensive lineman. He played collegiately at Monmouth University from 2000 to 2003 under Kevin Callahan.

During his time as a player, Gallo transitioned to the offensive line, where he became an All-Conference guard. In his senior season (2003), he helped lead the Hawks to a Northeast Conference (NEC) championship and an ECAC Football Classic title. He was named first team All-NEC and a second team Don Hansen All-American.

Gallo graduated from Monmouth in 2005 and later earned an MBA from the university in 2012.

== Coaching career ==
=== Assistant coach ===
Gallo joined the Monmouth coaching staff in 2005 immediately after graduation. He was promoted to tight ends coach in 2007, a position he held for nearly two decades. During his tenure as tight ends coach, he developed multiple NFL players, including John Nalbone (a fifth-round draft pick by the Miami Dolphins) and Hakeem Valles.

In the spring of 2019, Gallo was elevated to offensive coordinator while retaining his duties with the tight ends. In his first season leading the offense (2019), the unit broke over 50 program records, including single-season marks for total offense and scoring. That season, quarterback Kenji Bahar set school records for passing yards and touchdowns, while running back Pete Guerriero led the entire NCAA in rushing with 1,995 yards. The Hawks won the Big South Conference title and secured the program's first-ever FCS Playoff victory, a 44–27 win over Holy Cross.

Gallo's offense continued to rank among the nation's best as Monmouth transitioned to the CAA in 2022. Under his guidance, running back Jaden Shirden led the FCS in rushing yards in back-to-back seasons (2022 and 2023) and finished as a top-three finalist for the Walter Payton Award.

In 2024, Gallo coached the team to its first victory over an NCAA Division I Football Bowl Subdivision (FBS) opponent in program history, defeating FIU, 45–42. By the end of the 2025 season, his offense ranked first nationally in total offense (498.7 yards per game). Gallo was named a finalist for the FootballScoop.com FCS Coordinator of the Year award in both 2024 and 2025.

=== Head coach ===
On December 11, 2025, following Kevin Callahan's transition to an advisory role after 33 seasons, Monmouth University Athletic Director Jennifer Sansevero announced Gallo as the program's second-ever head coach.

== Personal life ==
Gallo resides in Howell Township, New Jersey, with his wife, Kirsten, and their two children.

== Head coaching record ==
Year	Team	Overall	Conference	Standing	Bowl/playoffs	Coaches^{#}	AP^{°}
Monmouth Hawks (CAA) (2026–present)
2026	Monmouth	8–3	7–0	1st			
Monmouth:		8–3	7–0				
Total:		8–3					
^{#}Rankings from final Coaches Poll.; ^{°}Rankings from final AP Poll.
