= Joshua Evans (Quaker minister) =

Joshua Evans (September 23, 1731 – July 6, 1798) was an American Quaker minister, journalist, and abolitionist.

He was born to Thomas Evans and Rebecca Owen in Evesham Township in Burlington County, New Jersey. Joshua Evans and Priscilla Collins, daughter of John Collins and Elizabeth Moore, were married at Haddonfield Monthly Meeting on November 2, 1753. Evans, after experiencing a religious conversion about the year 1754, devoted his life to sharing his interpretation of the gospel. He practiced a simple ministry and an ascetic and pious life style, and was a vegetarian. In 1759, Haddonfield Monthly Meeting acknowledged him as a minister. Evans was an abolitionist and a passionate supporter of Quaker plainness and the Peace Testimony and war tax resistance.

Returning to New Jersey from a journey through the South, where he strongly condemned slavery, Joshua Evans died in 1798.

Historians at Friends Historical Library of Swarthmore College have transcribed his papers with the intention of displaying them on the Internet.
