= Pam Jenoff =

American lawyer

Pam Jenoff is an American author, lawyer, and professor of law at Rutgers University. She writes love stories and historical novels, some of which have been nominated for awards and many of which have been bestsellers. She is still writing and lives with her three children and husband in New Jersey.

== Biography ==
A resident of Haddonfield, New Jersey, Jenoff grew up in Evesham Township, where she attended Cherokee High School. Her mother "grew up in South Philadelphia in the 1940s"; "my dad’s family is from Atlantic City and my grandparents and great grandparents owned hotels and restaurants there in the 1930s and 40s."

Her bachelor's degree is from George Washington University and her M.A. (in history) is from Cambridge University. Her J.D. degree is from the University of Pennsylvania Law School. A former special assistant to the secretary of the Army and a State Department officer, she lives in Philadelphia and teaches evidence, employment law, and legal writing at the Camden campus of Rutgers Law School.

She had just begun practicing law at a private firm when the 9/11 attacks spurred her to pursue a personal goal of becoming a writer.

== Books ==
The Kommandant's Girl (2007) was nominated for a Quill Award. Publishers Weekly described The Things We Cherished (2012) as "a timeless love story." Harlequin MIRA released The Other Girl on September 1, 2014.

Although Jenoff's State Department experience was in Poland, she says that she "wrote all my earlier books set in Europe [while] living in America" and her first novel set in the US while living in Poland.

The Last Summer at Chelsea Beach was begun some 20 years before its completion; Jenoff acknowledges Louisa May Alcott's Little Women as an inspiration for this novel.

The Lost Girls of Paris (2019) covers much the same ground as Susan Elia MacNeal's The Paris Spy (2017). Both novels rely on the history of Vera Atkins and the women she recruited and trained to work for Britain's Special Operations Executive during World War II.

== List of works ==
Novels

- The Kommandant's Girl (The Kommandant's Girl, #1) (2007)
- The Diplomat's Wife (The Kommandant's Girl, #2) (2008)
- Almost Home (2008)
- A Hidden Affair
- The Things We Cherished
- The Ambassador's Daughter (Prequel to The Kommandant's Girl) (2013)
- The Winter Guest (2014)
- The Other Girl (2014)
- The Last Summer at Chelsea Beach (2015)
- The Orphan's Tale (2017)
- The Lost Girls of Paris (2019)
- The Woman with the Blue Star (2021)
- Code Name Sapphire (2023)
