= Jay Black (comedian) =

American comedian, screenwriter, and actor

Jay Black (born 1976) is an American comedian, screenwriter, and actor.

== Life and career ==
Black grew up in the Marlton, Evesham Township, Burlington County, New Jersey. He attended Helen L. Beeler Elementary School along with his future writing and producing partner Brian Herzlinger. Black graduated from Cherokee High School in 1994 and from The College of New Jersey in 1999.

He taught English at Seneca High School and Shawnee High School before leaving in 2007 to pursue a career in stand-up comedy. He was the college comic of the year in 2009, 2013, and 2014. He was the all-around college performer of the year in 2013. Black has been Kevin Nealon's regular opening act at clubs around the country as well as a headliner in his own right. He started writing screenplays with his partner, Herzlinger, in 2006, selling several.

In 2015, Black starred along with Scott Wolf in "Meet My Valentine", a movie he wrote along with Brian Herzlinger, which Herzlinger directed.
