= Marlton, New Jersey =

Census-designated place in Burlington County, New Jersey, United States

- Census-designated place
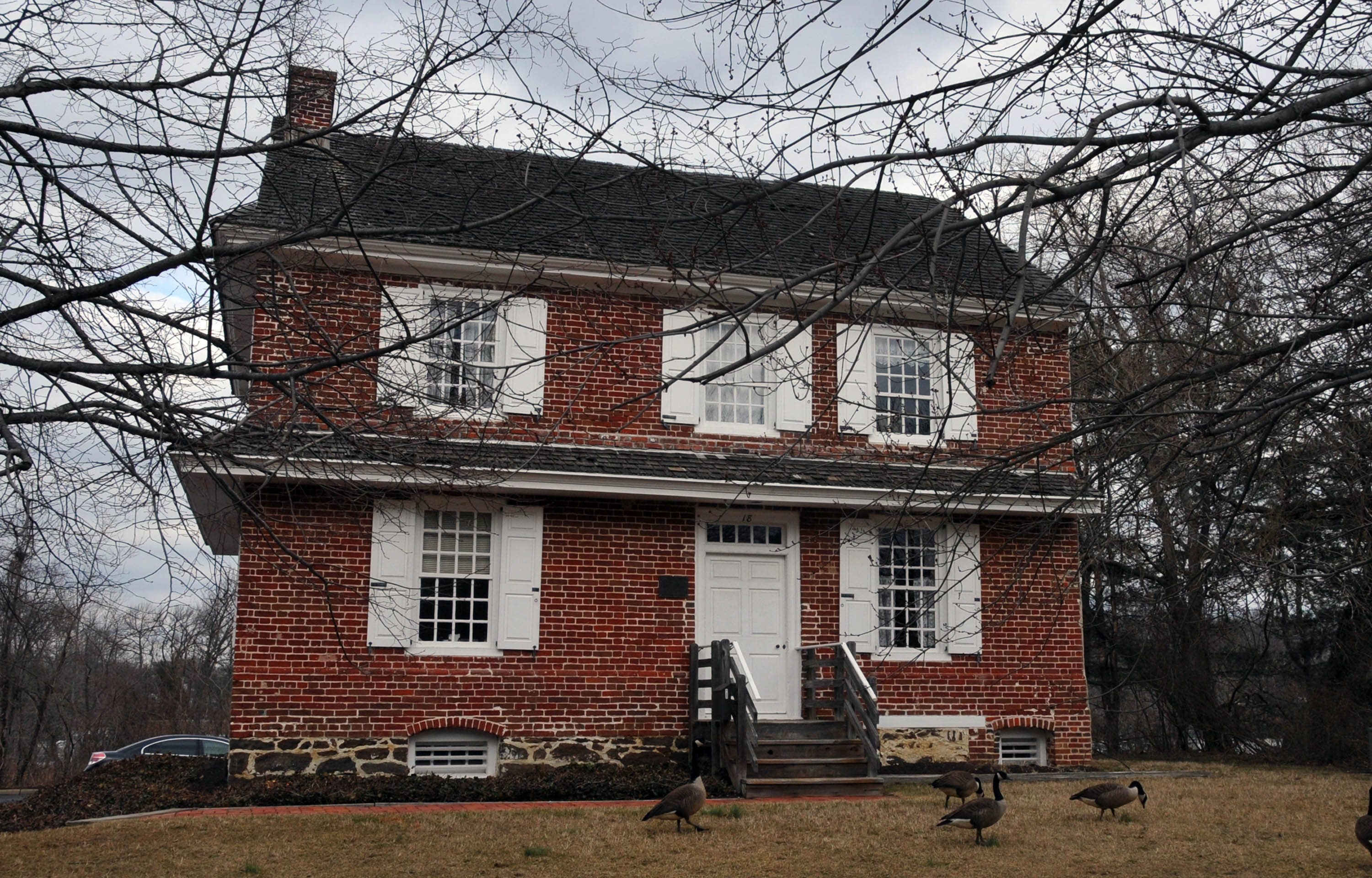
- Thomas Hollinshead House

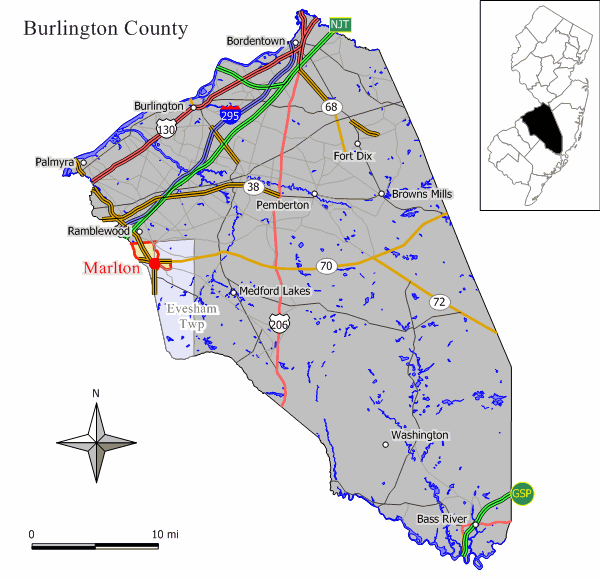
- Location of Marlton in Burlington County highlighted in yellow (left). Inset map: Location of Ocean County in New Jersey highlighted in black (right).

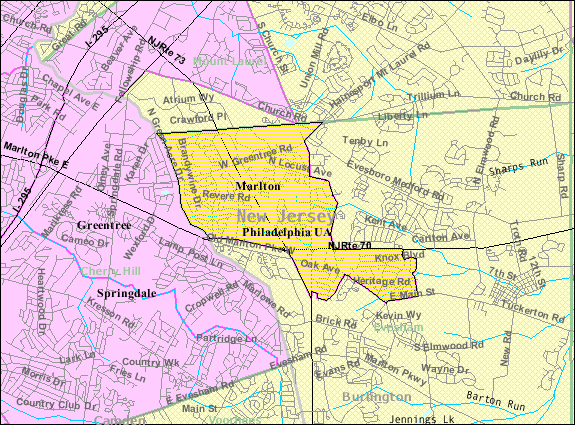
- Census Bureau map of Marlton, New Jersey

- Location in Burlington County Location in New Jersey Location in the United States
- Coordinates: 39.901885°N 74.929277°W
- Country: United States
- State: New Jersey
- County: Burlington
- Township: Evesham
- Founded: 1676

Area
  - Total: 3.31 sq mi (8.57 km^{2})
  - Land: 3.30 sq mi (8.55 km^{2})
  - Water: 0.0077 sq mi (0.02 km^{2}) 0.25%
- Elevation: 95 ft (29 m)

Population (2020)
  - Total: 10,594
  - Density: 3,210.3/sq mi (1,239.52/km^{2})
- Time zone: UTC−05:00 (Eastern (EST))
  - Summer (DST): UTC−04:00 (Eastern (EDT))
- ZIP Code: 08053
- Area code: 856 exchanges: 396, 424, 489, 596, 751, 797, 810, 874, 983, 985, 988
- FIPS code: 34-44100
- GNIS feature ID: 02390126

Marlton is a census-designated place (CDP) located within Evesham Township in Burlington County, in the U.S. state of New Jersey. As of the 2020 United States census, the CDP had a population of 10,594 residents, reflecting a 4.5% increase from the 10,133 enumerated at the 2010 U.S. census, in turn a 1.2% decrease from the 10,260 counted in the 2000 census.

While Marlton comprises only a small part of Evesham Township, many people colloquially refer to the entire township as Marlton.

== History ==
Marlton was founded by Welsh and English farmers beginning in 1676. The name Marlton first appeared in the early 19th century. The name is derived from marl clay, which is commonly found in the local soil. The discovery of the marl content helped local business and farmers, and caused the first "building boom", occurring in the 1830s and 1840s. Marl continued to be excavated in Marlton until 1930, when the pits were shut down. The marl was sold locally, and shipped directly, by rail to Burlington City, Philadelphia, Pennsylvania, and Atlantic City, for reshipping as an alternate for green manure, water treatment amendment, and semi-flowable fill.

== Landmarks ==
PH-32, a Project Nike missile base from the Cold War, was completed in 1955 on a 38-acre (15 ha) site located near Marlton Middle School.

== Geography ==
According to the U.S. Census Bureau, Marlton had a total area of 3.235 square miles (8.38 km^{2}), including 3.227 square miles (8.36 km^{2}) of it is land and 0.008 square miles (0.021 km^{2}; 5.1 acres) of water (0.25%).

== Demographics ==
Historical population
Census	Pop.	Note	%±
1970	10,180		—
1980	9,411		−7.6%
1990	10,228		8.7%
2000	10,260		0.3%
2010	10,133		−1.2%
2020	10,594		4.5%
Population sources: 1970-1980; 1950 1960 1970; 1980 1990 2000; 2010 2020

Marlton first appeared as an unincorporated community in the 1970 U.S. census; and then was listed as a census designated place in the 1980 U.S. census.

=== Racial and ethnic composition ===
Marlton CDP, New Jersey – Racial and ethnic composition Note: the US Census treats Hispanic/Latino as an ethnic category. This table excludes Latinos from the racial categories and assigns them to a separate category. Hispanics/Latinos may be of any race.
Race / Ethnicity (NH = Non-Hispanic)	Pop 2000	Pop 2010	Pop 2020	% 2000	% 2010	% 2020
White alone (NH)	9,203	8,494	8,221	89.70%	83.83%	77.60%
Black or African American alone (NH)	286	416	522	2.79%	4.11%	4.93%
Native American or Alaska Native alone (NH)	14	13	0	0.14%	0.13%	0.00%
Asian alone (NH)	428	613	737	4.17%	6.05%	6.96%
Native Hawaiian or Pacific Islander alone (NH)	1	1	3	0.01%	0.01%	0.03%
Other race alone (NH)	8	10	40	0.08%	0.10%	0.38%
Mixed race or Multiracial (NH)	80	139	432	0.78%	1.37%	4.08%
Hispanic or Latino (any race)	240	447	639	2.34%	4.41%	6.03%
Total	10,260	10,133	10,594	100.00%	100.00%	100.00%

=== 2020 census ===
As of the 2020 census, Marlton had a population of 10,594. The median age was 41.9 years. 18.6% of residents were under the age of 18 and 17.8% were 65 years of age or older. For every 100 females, there were 94.1 males, and for every 100 females age 18 and older there were 91.2 males.

100.0% of residents lived in urban areas, while 0.0% lived in rural areas.

There were 4,525 households in Marlton, of which 25.5% had children under the age of 18 living in them. Of all households, 45.3% were married-couple households, 17.8% were households with a male householder and no spouse or partner present, and 30.5% were households with a female householder and no spouse or partner present. About 32.9% of all households were made up of individuals and 14.8% had someone living alone who was 65 years of age or older.

There were 4,725 housing units, of which 4.2% were vacant. The homeowner vacancy rate was 0.9% and the rental vacancy rate was 6.7%.

=== 2010 census ===
The 2010 United States census counted 10,133 people, 4,126 households, and 2,653 families in the CDP. The population density was 3,140.3 per square mile (1,212.5/km^{2}). There were 4,343 housing units at an average density of 1,345.9 per square mile (519.7/km^{2}). The racial makeup was 86.57% (8,772) White, 4.27% (433) Black or African American, 0.15% (15) Native American, 6.10% (618) Asian, 0.01% (1) Pacific Islander, 1.30% (132) from other races, and 1.60% (162) from two or more races. Hispanic or Latino of any race were 4.41% (447) of the population.

Of the 4,126 households, 28.2% had children under the age of 18; 50.7% were married couples living together; 10.2% had a female householder with no husband present and 35.7% were non-families. Of all households, 29.9% were made up of individuals and 9.2% had someone living alone who was 65 years of age or older. The average household size was 2.45 and the average family size was 3.12.

21.4% of the population were under the age of 18, 7.5% from 18 to 24, 28.7% from 25 to 44, 28.7% from 45 to 64, and 13.6% who were 65 years of age or older. The median age was 40.3 years. For every 100 females, the population had 92.2 males. For every 100 females ages 18 and older there were 90.3 males.

=== 2000 census ===
As of the 2000 U.S. census, there were 10,260 people, 4,097 households, and 2,728 families residing in Marlton. The population density was 3,171.0 inhabitants per square mile (1,224.3/km^{2}). There were 4,203 housing units at an average density of 1,299 per square mile (502/km^{2}). The racial makeup of Marlton was 91.32% White, 2.88% Black or African American, 0.14% Native American, 4.18% Asian, 0.01% Pacific Islander, 0.59% from other races, and 0.89% from two or more races. Hispanic or Latino of any race were 2.34% of the population.

There were 4,097 households, out of which 30.7% had children under the age of 18 living with them, 54.3% were married couples living together, 9.3% had a female householder with no husband present, and 33.4% were non-families. 28.4% of all households were made up of individuals, and 7.8% had someone living alone who was 65 years of age or older. The average household size was 2.49 and the average family size was 3.12.

In Marlton, the population was spread out, with 23.5% under the age of 18, 6.6% from 18 to 24, 34.8% from 25 to 44, 23.2% from 45 to 64, and 12.0% who were 65 years of age or older. The median age was 37 years. For every 100 females, there were 93.8 males. For every 100 females age 18 and over, there were 91.2 males.

The median income for a household in Marlton was $52,271, and the median income for a family was $61,217. Males had a median income of $46,905 versus $31,798 for females. The per capita income for Marlton was $25,145. About 2.1% of families and 3.5% of the population were below the poverty line, including 3.6% of those under age 18 and 2.9% of those age 65 or over.

== Transportation ==
NJ Transit provides bus service on the 406 route to and from Philadelphia.

The Marlton Circle was a traffic circle at the intersection of Route 70 and Route 73. In 2010, the circle was completely eliminated and replaced with a grade-separated interchange where Route 73 crosses over Route 70. The new traffic pattern was completed in late 2011.

The Philadelphia Marlton and Medford Railroad made multiple stops in Marlton from July 1881 to September 24, 1927.

== Education ==
The CDP is in the Evesham Township School District (elementary and middle school) and the Lenape Regional School District (for high school). All residents of Evesham Township are zoned to Cherokee High School. Additionally, the small school program at Seneca High School accepts Evesham Township residents.

== Notable people ==
People who were born in, residents of, or otherwise closely associated with Marlton include:

- Brian Baldinger (born 1960), Fox Sports commentator and former NFL offensive tackle
- Esther E. Baldwin (1840–1910), missionary, teacher and writer
- Joshua Beckley, poker player who won $4.4 million after finishing second at the main event of the 2015 World Series of Poker
- Jay Black (born 1976), stand-up comic and screenwriter
- Braille (stage name of Bryan Winchester, born 1981), rapper
- Sheldon Brown (born 1979), defensive back for the Philadelphia Eagles and the Cleveland Browns
- Greg Burke (born 1982), former professional baseball pitcher who played for the San Diego Padres and New York Mets
- Anthony Caruso (born 1966), entrepreneur
- Mike Devlin (born 1969), former NFL offensive lineman who has been an assistant coach with the New York Jets
- Jeff Gallo, college football coach and former player who is the head coach for the Monmouth Hawks football team
- Christina Grimmie (1994–2016), YouTube musician and season 6 contestant on The Voice
- Andy Kim (born 1982), junior United States senator from New Jersey since 2024
- Lee B. Laskin (1936–2024), attorney, politician and judge who served in both houses of the New Jersey Legislature before being appointed to serve on the New Jersey Superior Court
- Pelle Lindbergh (1959–1985), former goaltender for the Philadelphia Flyers
- LeSean McCoy (born 1988), former NFL professional running back
- Jody McDonald (born 1959), sports radio talk show host on WTEL 610 and also on WFAN 660
- Liz Montague, cartoonist, who was one of the first Black cartoonists to have her work published in The New Yorker
- Brit Morgan (born 1987), actress who has portrayed Debbie Pelt in the HBO series True Blood
- Blaine Neal (born 1978), former Major League Baseball relief pitcher
- Jessica O'Rourke (born 1986), professional soccer player
- Bill Osborn (born c. 1966), former American football player who played professionally in the National Football League, World League and the Arena Football League
- Jerry Penacoli (born 1956), actor, former newscaster, current correspondent on Extra
- Richard Ruccolo (born 1972), actor who has appeared in Two Guys and a Girl and Rita Rocks
- Chris Therien (born 1971), former defenseman for the Philadelphia Flyers and Dallas Stars. Currently works as a color commentator for the Philadelphia Flyers
- Carl Truscott (born 1957), former director of the Bureau of Alcohol, Tobacco, Firearms and Explosives
- Jessica Woodard (born 1995), track and field athlete who competes in shot put
