= Monmouth Hawks football =

Football program representing Monmouth University

2026 Monmouth Hawks football team
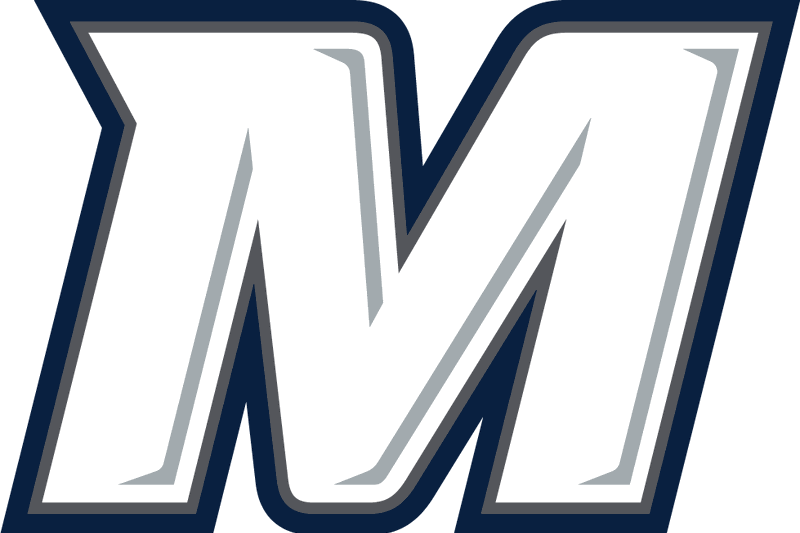
- First season: 1993; 33 years ago
- Head coach: Jeff Gallo; 1st season, 0–0 (–)
- Location: West Long Branch, New Jersey
- Stadium: Kessler Stadium (capacity: 4,200)
- NCAA division: Division I FCS
- Conference: CAA Football
- Colors: Midnight blue and white
- All-time record: 197–151 (.566)
- Bowl record: 1–1 (.500)

Conference championships
- NEC: 1996, 1998, 2003, 2004, 2006 Big South: 2019, 2020 CAA: 2026
- Website: monmouthhawks.com

The Monmouth Hawks football program is the intercollegiate American football team for Monmouth University located in the U.S. state of New Jersey. The Hawks compete in the NCAA Division I Football Championship Subdivision (FCS) as a member of the Coastal Athletic Association Football Conference (CAA). The school's first football team was fielded in 1993. The team plays its home games at the 4,200 seat Kessler Field. They are coached by Jeff Gallo, a Monmouth alumnus and former player who was named head coach in December 2025 following the retirement of the program's founding coach, Kevin Callahan.

== Championships ==
=== Conference ===
Season	Coach	Conference	Overall record	Conference record
1996†	Kevin Callahan	Northeast Conference	7–3	3–1
1998†	Kevin Callahan	Northeast Conference	5–5	4–1
2003†	Kevin Callahan	Northeast Conference	10–2	6–1
2004†	Kevin Callahan	Northeast Conference	10–1	6–1
2006	Kevin Callahan	Northeast Conference	10–2	6–1
2019	Kevin Callahan	Big South Conference	9–2	5–0
2020	Kevin Callahan	Big South Conference	3–1	3–0
2026	Jeff Gallo	Coastal Athletic Association Football Conference	8–3	7–0

† Co-champions

== Division I-AA/FCS playoffs ==
The Hawks have made three appearances in the Division I-AA/FCS playoffs, with an overall record of 1–3.

Year	Round	Opponent	Result
2017	First Round	Northern Iowa	L 7–46
2019	First Round; Second Round	Holy Cross; James Madison	W 44–27; L 21–66
2020	First Round	Sam Houston State	L 15–21

== Notable former players ==
To date, six Monmouth Hawks alumni have played in the National Football League (NFL). In addition to the NFL, Monmouth alumni have played professionally for the Canadian Football League (CFL) and the Arena Football League (AFL).

Former wide receiver Miles Austin was the first player from Monmouth to appear in the NFL and played in the league for 10 seasons, primarily with the Dallas Cowboys.

=== NFL players ===
- Miles Austin
- Jose Gumbs
- Chris Hogan
- John Nalbone
- Neal Sterling
- Hakeem Valles
- Owen Wright

=== CFL players ===
- Tevrin Brandon
- Reggie White Jr.

=== AFL players ===
- Brian Brikowski
- Will Holder

== Future non-conference opponents ==
Announced schedules as of December 16, 2025.

2026	2027	2028	2029
at Tennessee Tech	at Central Michigan	at Montana	Princeton
at Western Michigan		at Princeton	
at Dartmouth			
Merrimack			
