= Shawnee High School (New Jersey) =

High school in Burlington County, New Jersey, US

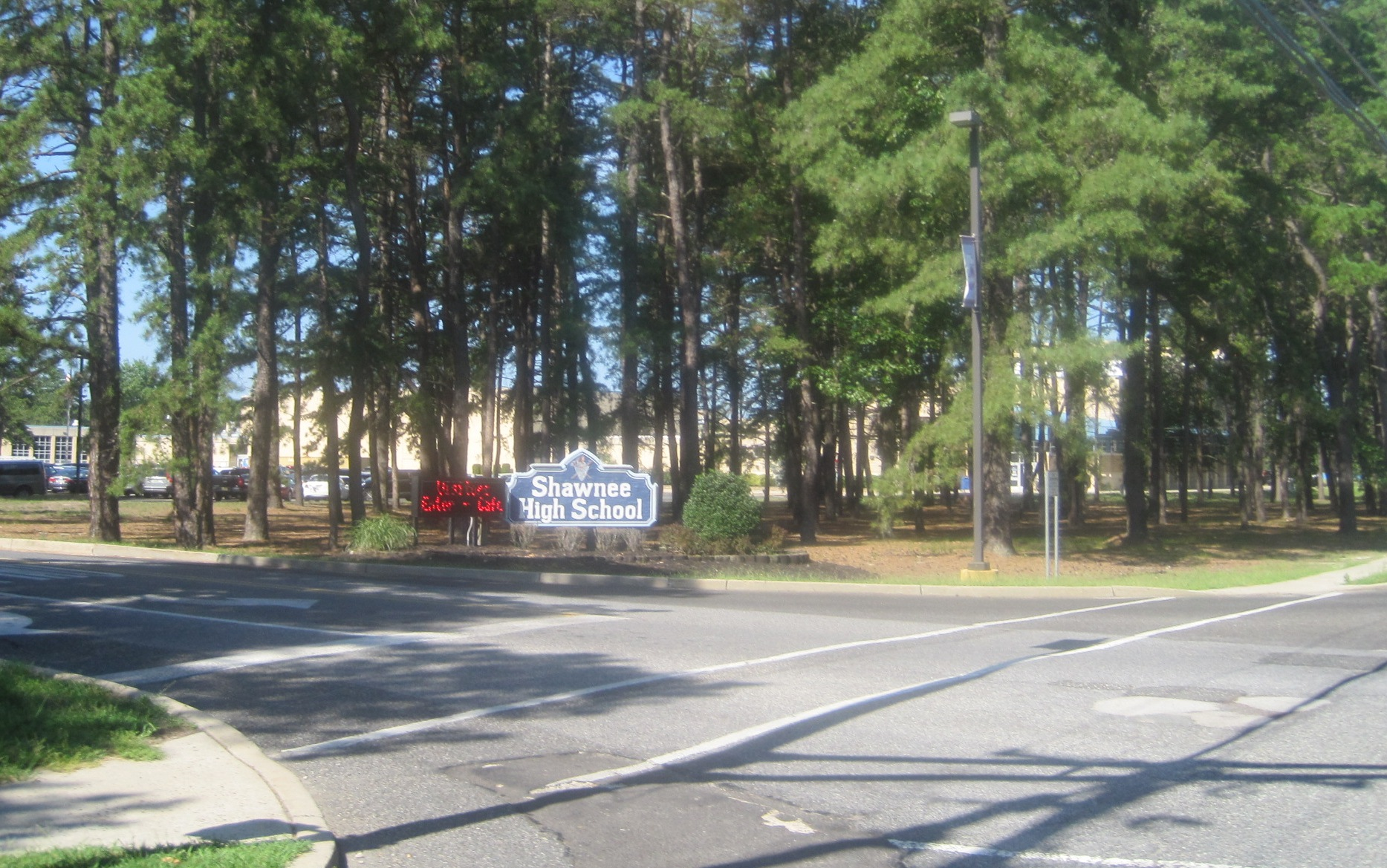

Location
- 600 Tabernacle Road; Medford, Burlington County, New Jersey 08055; United States; 39.8556°N 74.7761°W

Information
- Type: Public high school
- Established: 1970; 56 years ago
- School district: Lenape Regional High School District
- NCES School ID: 340849001096
- Principal: Matthew Campbell
- Faculty: 114.0 FTEs
- Grades: 9–12
- Enrollment: 1,418 (as of 2023–24)
- Student to teacher ratio: 12.4:1
- Schedule: 6 periods
- Hours in school day: 7 hours
- Colors: Navy blue Columbia blue White
- Athletics conference: Olympic Conference (general); West Jersey Football League (football)
- Team name: Renegades
- Rivals: Cherokee High School; Moorestown High School
- Accreditation: Middle States Association of Colleges and Schools
- Website: www.lrhsd.org/shawnee
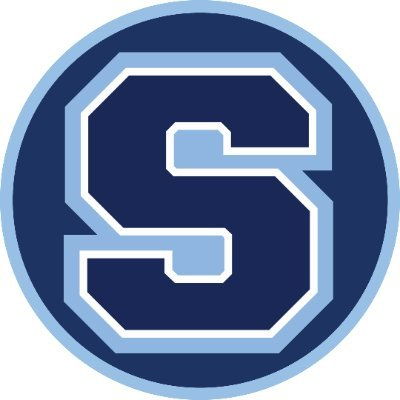

Shawnee High School is a four-year comprehensive public high school in Burlington County, in the U.S. state of New Jersey, operating as part of the Lenape Regional High School District. The district serves students in ninth through twelfth grades from Evesham Township, Medford Lakes, Medford Township, Mount Laurel, Shamong Township, Southampton Township, Tabernacle Township and Woodland Township. The school serves students from Medford Lakes and Medford Township. The school has been accredited by the Middle States Association of Colleges and Schools Commission on Elementary and Secondary Schools since 1975. Its current accreditation is valid through July 2031.

As of the 2023–24 school year, the school had an enrollment of 1,418 students and 114.0 classroom teachers (on an FTE basis), for a student–teacher ratio of 12.4:1. There were 64 students (4.5% of enrollment) eligible for free lunch and 31 (2.2% of students) eligible for reduced-cost lunch.

== History ==
Plans for the school facility were announced in 1968 with an estimated cost of $3.5 million (equivalent to $32.4 million in 2025). The building was designed by architect Frederic P. Wiedersum Associates to accommodate 1,500 students and included 26 classrooms, a gym, a cafeteria, and a 600-seat auditorium. Shawnee High School opened its doors in 1970 as the second of the district's four high schools.

The opening of Seneca High School in September 2003 led to a decline in enrollment at Shawnee, which helped to alleviate the overcrowding the school had previously experienced.

== Awards, recognition and rankings ==
The school was the 48th-ranked public high school in New Jersey out of 339 schools statewide in New Jersey Monthly magazine's September 2014 cover story on the state's "Top Public High Schools", using a new ranking methodology. The school had been ranked 142nd in the state of 328 schools in 2012, after being ranked 100th in 2010 out of 322 schools listed. The magazine ranked the school 108th in 2008 out of 316 schools. The school was ranked 110th in the magazine's September 2006 issue, which surveyed 316 schools across the state. Schooldigger.com ranked the school tied for 58th out of 381 public high schools statewide in its 2011 rankings (a decrease of 5 positions from the 2010 ranking) which were based on the combined percentage of students classified as proficient or above proficient on the mathematics (90.7%) and language arts literacy (97.4%) components of the High School Proficiency Assessment (HSPA).

== Arts ==
The band program is under the direction of Nick Rotindo. Recent accomplishments include:

Marching band

- 2005 USSBA New Jersey State Group III Open Class Champions
- 2005 USSBA All-State Group III Open Class Champions
- 2005 Undefeated season
- 2006 USSBA New Jersey State Group II Open Class Champions
- 2006 USSBA All-State Group II Open Class Champions
- 2006 USSBA National Champions Group II, for its program titled "Going for Broke: a Gamer's Tale".
- 2007 4th Place USSBA National Championships Group III, winning General Effect and Visual Effect.
- 2016 USSBA New Jersey Group IV Open Class Champions
- 2021 TOB Group 2A Atlantic Coast Champions

Jazz Band

- 2005 New Jersey State Champions
- 2006 New Jersey State Champions
- 2007 3rd Place Finish at New Jersey state championships
- 2008 3rd Place Finish at New Jersey state championships
- 2009 2nd Place Finish at New Jersey state championships

In earlier years, students auditioned and were selected for honors choirs. These accomplishments include:

Choral

- 1995 MENC: All-Eastern Honors Choir & Band (Choir: Kevin Scott Collins, tenor; Elise Quagliata, alto. Band: Jessica Williams)

== Athletics ==
The Shawnee High School Renegades participate in the Olympic Conference, which is comprised of public and private high schools located in Burlington and Camden counties and operates under the supervision of the New Jersey State Interscholastic Athletic Association (NJSIAA). With 1,170 students in grades 10-12, the school was classified by the NJSIAA for the 2022-23 school year as South, Group 4 for most athletic competition purposes, which included schools with an enrollment of 1,060 to 5,049 students in that grade range. The football team competes in the American Division of the 94-team West Jersey Football League superconference and was classified by the NJSIAA as Group IV South for football for 2024–2026, which included schools with 890 to 1,298 students.

In addition to nationally ranked men's soccer and women's lacrosse programs, the football, basketball, and men's lacrosse teams are consistently ranked among the top teams in South Jersey. As a part of the Lenape Regional High School District, Shawnee High School participates in many sports.

Shawnee High School has a club ice hockey team that competes in Varsity Tier I as a member of the South Jersey High School Ice Hockey League.

The girls' cross country team won the Group IV state championship in 1983, 1990, 1991, 1993, 1995, 1997, 2002, and 2003. The eight group titles are the seventh most of all schools in New Jersey. The girls' cross country team won the Meet of Champions in 1991, 1997, 2002, and 2003; the program's four state team titles are tied for third-most in the state.

The girls' lacrosse team was overall state champion in 1989 (defeating Moorestown High School in the tournament final), 1992 (vs. Moorestown), 1993 (vs. Summit High School), 1994 and 1996 (vs. Lenape High School), 1997 (vs. Hunterdon Central High School) and 1998 (vs. Moorestown). The team won the Group IV state title in 2013 (vs. Ridgewood High School). The eight state titles won by the program are tied for second-most in the state. The Burlington County Times called the Moorestown-Shawnee girls lacrosse programs the "ultimate rivalry", citing the 14 straight years through 2012 in which the two teams played each other in the playoffs, and the number of group titles won by the two programs. The 1989 team finished the season with a record of 17-1-0 after winning the overall state title by a score of 7-4 in the championship game against a Moorestown team that entered the playoff finals with no losses in 54 games and having won the two previous state titles.

The boys' basketball team won state championships in Group IV in 1992 (vs. Irvington High School), 1995 (vs. Elizabeth High School), 1996 (vs. Teaneck High School), 2001 (vs. Passaic High School), and 2018 (vs. Newark East Side High School) and in Group III in 2007 (vs. Passaic Valley Regional High School). The 1992 team won its 30th game of the season with a 69-56 win against Irvington in the Group IV championship game and finished the season with a record of 32–1 as the first South Jersey team to win the NJSIAA Tournament of Champions with a 46–42 win over Marist High School, a team that had been ranked third in the nation by USA Today. The 1995 team won the Group IV title with a 63-46 win against Elizabeth in the championship game. The team won the South, Group III state sectional championship in 2007 with a 68–62 win against Camden High School, and went on to win the 2007 Group III NJSIAA state championship, defeating Monmouth Regional High School 73–47 in the semifinals and Passaic Valley by a score of 58–39 in the finals. The team has been ranked by USA Today in the top 25 national poll numerous times and was named No. 1 in Hoop Scoops magazine's final 1994–95 poll.

The girls' basketball team won consecutive South Jersey Group IV titles in 1998 and 1999, winning their second title with a 60–42 win over Eastern High School.

The football team won the South Jersey Group IV state sectional title in 2002, 2004, 2013, and 2014, and the South Jersey Group III title in 2007 and 2008. The Shawnee football team won its third South Jersey state sectional championship in 2007, the first in Group III, rebounding from a disappointing 2006 season in which they had a losing record for the first time in nine years. The Renegades repeated as South Jersey Group III Champs in 2008 with a 28–7 win against Hammonton High School. Their two other state titles were won in 2002 and 2004 in Group IV, where they returned in 2009. The 2002 team won the program's first title with a 14–10 win over Washington Township High School, despite being shut out 10–0 in the first half of the final. The '04 team went a perfect 12–0 in one of the toughest conferences in South Jersey to win the title with a 26–13 win over Washington Township. When Seneca High School was built, Shawnee waited two years to drop down from Group IV competition to Group III. Area growth has brought Shawnee back to Group IV while Seneca remains in Group III. Coached by Tim Gushue, the Renegades are perennial powerhouses in South Jersey. The Shawnee Renegades finished the season with a 9–3 record and won the 2013 South Jersey Group IV championship, the program's fifth sectional title, with a 31–22 win against top-seeded Timber Creek Regional High School in a game played at Rowan University; the Renegades won against third seed Hammonton High School by 10–7 in the quarterfinals and erased a 24–0 deficit in the semifinals to win against second-seeded Toms River South High School by a score of 28–24. The team won the South Jersey Group IV state sectional title in 2017, the program's seventh, with a 41–6 win in the playoff championship game against Hammonton High School; the team scored 40 or more points in each of the three rounds of the tournament, including a 41–0 shutout of fifth-seeded Absegami High School in the first round and a 40–7 win against top-seeded Moorestown High School in the semifinals. The football team has a rivalry with Cherokee High School, listed 22nd on NJ.com's 2017 list "Ranking the 31 fiercest rivalries in N.J. HS football". Cherokee leads the rivalry with a 28-17-1 record as of 2017.

Shawnee baseball won its first NJSIAA state title in 2003, led by future Oakland Athletics' 2007 first-round draft pick Sean Doolittle and his 23 strikeouts in the 5–3 victory in the Group IV tournament final over Kearny High School, to finish the season with a 23–7 record. After winning the state title, Seneca High School split up the Shawnee population. They played one more year in the Olympic American conference, then moved down to the Olympic Patriot conference. As of 2006, Shawnee won its conference three years in a row. The team won the South Jersey Group III state title in 2009 under Brian Anderson, the head coach, who also coaches the girls' basketball team and used to be the coordinator for the powerful Shawnee football defense, defeating Clearview Regional High School 9–2 in the sectional final. The 2009 team made it to the Group II final, falling to John F. Kennedy Memorial High School by 5–2.

The boys' soccer team won the Group IV state championship in 1988 (vs. Columbia High School), 1992 (vs. Columbia), 1993 (vs. East Orange High School), 1997 (vs. Kearny High School), 2001 (in overtime vs. Kearny), 2003 (vs. Bridgewater-Raritan High School), and in Group III in 2006 (vs. Ramapo High School). The team won the 2003 NJSIAA Group IV state title, defeating Bridgewater-Raritan by a score of 2–0 in the tournament's final game. The 2006 team finished the season ranked tenth in the nation in the NSCAA/Adidas National Rankings. The 2006 team took the South, Group III state sectional title with a 3–0 win against Ocean City High School in the tournament final. The 2006 team won the Group III state championship with a 1–0 win over Princeton High School in the semifinals and a 3–2 win against Ramapo High School in the finals.

The 2006 girls' soccer team won the South Jersey Group III state sectional title with a 3–0 win against West Deptford High School in the tournament final, their first championship since winning three consecutive titles from 1994 to 1996.

The field hockey team won the South Jersey Group IV state sectional championship in 1977, 1981–1983, 1986, 1988–1992, 1994–1996, 1998, and 2010, won the Central Jersey Group IV title in 1999, 2001, 2002, 2005, and 2010, and the South Jersey Group III title in 2007. The team won the Group IV state championship in 1977 (runner-up not specified), 1981 (vs. West Essex High School), 1983 (vs. West Essex), 1988 (vs. Montclair High School), 1989 (vs. Morristown High School), 1990 (vs. Vernon Township High School), 1991 (vs. Morristown), 1992 (vs. Westfield High School), 1995 (vs. Vernon Township) and 1998 (vs. Phillipsburg High School), and won the Group III title in 2007 (vs. Freehold High School) The team won the 2007 Tournament of Champions, defeating Oak Knoll School of the Holy Child in the final game of the tournament. The 11 state championships won by the program are the fifth most of any school in the state, and the streak of five consecutive titles from 1987 to 1991 is tied for second-longest. In 1977, a 1-0 win in the Group IV championship game over Passaic Valley Regional High School led the team to a 14-4-6 record. The 1989 team finished the season with a 20-0-1 record after winning the Group IV title with a 5-0 defeat of Morristown in the championship game. In 2007, the field hockey team won the South Jersey, Group III state sectional championship with a 4–0 win over Kingsway Regional High School in the tournament final. The team moved on to win the Group III state championship with a 4–2 win over Moorestown High School in the semis and a 6–0 win against Freehold High School in the finals.

The boys' track team won the Group IV state indoor relay championships in 1992 and 1993.

The boys' swim team won the New Jersey Group IV South titles in 1995 and 1996. They were back-to-back-to-back Group IV State Champions in 1997, 1998, and 1999. The team won the South Jersey Public A championships in 2008 and 2009.

The boys' tennis team won the 2012 South Jersey Group IV state sectional championship, beating Atlantic City High School 3–2. At 2-2, the first doubles team rallied back from 2–5 to win the deciding set 7–5, earning the team the school's first South Jersey Group IV title since 1996. They went on to lose to Westfield High School in the Group IV state semifinals 4–1. The Boys' Tennis team won the 2013 South Jersey Group IV championship, defeating Toms River North 5–0 in the championship.

== Activities ==
There are a wide variety of student-run organizations. Shawnee's Student Council is a member of the New Jersey Association of Student Councils and the National Association of Student Councils, the state and national student council associations. In addition, each grade has an executive homeroom that works to organize spirit week, prom, and an annual senior trip to Walt Disney World in Florida.

Each spring, the school also has an active extra-curricular arts program, including the All-School Musical.

== Notable alumni ==
- Brenden Aaronson (born 2000), professional soccer player for Leeds United
- Malik Allen (born 1978, class of 1996), NBA basketball player for the Milwaukee Bucks and assistant coach for the Detroit Pistons
- Brian Clarhaut (born 1986), soccer coach of Nyköpings BIS in the Swedish Division 1
- James Coulter (born 1959), co-founder of private equity firm TPG Capital
- Jarret DeHart (born 1994), assistant hitting coach for the Seattle Mariners
- Sean Doolittle (born 1986, class of 2004), Major League Baseball pitcher for the Washington Nationals
- Brian Earl (born 1976), former professional basketball player who is the head men's basketball coach at The College of William & Mary
- Dan Earl (born 1974), head coach for the Chattanooga Mocs men's basketball team
- Calista Flockhart (born 1964), actress and wife of actor Harrison Ford
- Jamie Franks (born 1986), head coach for the Denver Pioneers men's soccer team
- Michael Hartmann (born 1994), professional soccer player who plays as a goalkeeper for FC Haka in the Veikkausliiga
- Shana Hiatt (born 1975), television personality/hostess, actress
- Stephen King (born 1986), Major League Soccer player for the D.C. United
- Justin Murphy (born 1965), former committeeman and deputy mayor of Tabernacle Township and the Republican nominee in the U.S. Senate election in New Jersey in 2026
- Gregg Rakoczy (born 1965), NFL football player for the Cleveland Browns
- Chuck Ricci (born 1968, class of 1987), former professional baseball pitcher who played for the Philadelphia Phillies in 1995
- Liz Tchou (born 1966), former field hockey defender who played on the US women's team that finished fifth at the 1996 Summer Olympics in Atlanta, Georgia
- Drew Van Acker (born 1986) actor and model
- Nancy I. Williams, kinesiologist who served as President of the American Kinesiology Association
- Jeff Zaun (born 1971), former professional soccer player

== Notable faculty ==
- Jay Black (born 1976), comedian, screenwriter and actor

== Other schools in the district ==
Other schools in the district (with 2023–24 enrollment data from the National Center for Education Statistics) are:

- Cherokee High School - located in Evesham Township, with 2,108 students from Evesham Township
- Lenape High School - located in Medford Township, with 1,922 students from Mount Laurel Township
- Seneca High School - located in Tabernacle Township, with 1,018 students from Shamong, Southampton, Tabernacle and Woodland Townships
