= David Rollins (baseball) =

American baseball player (born 1989)

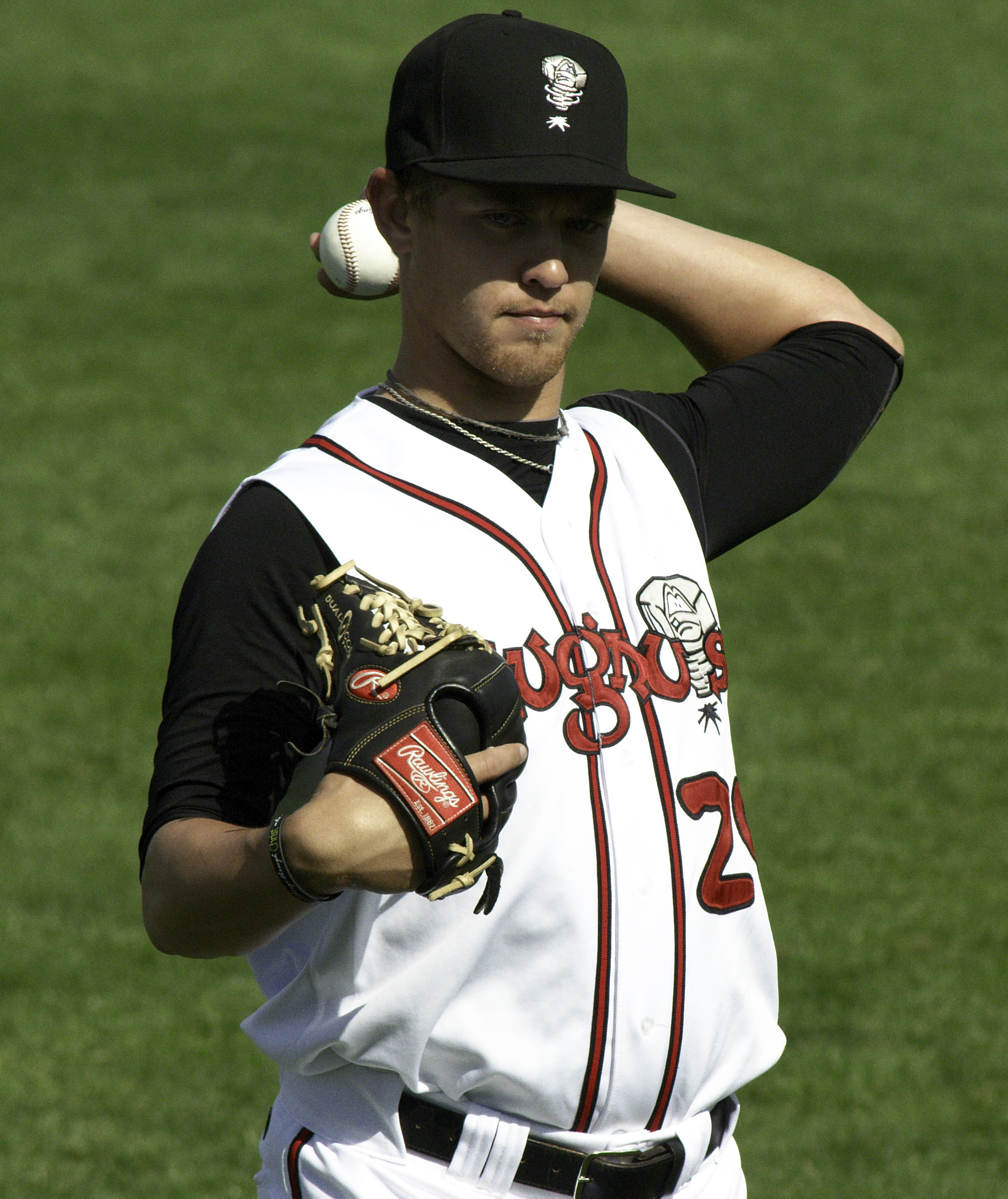
- Rollins with the Lansing Lugnuts in 2012
- Pitcher
- Born: December 21, 1989 (age 36); DeBerry, Texas, U.S.
- Batted: Left Threw: Left

MLB debut
- July 4, 2015, for the Seattle Mariners

Last MLB appearance
- September 20, 2016, for the Seattle Mariners

MLB statistics
- Win–loss record: 1–2
- Earned run average: 7.60
- Strikeouts: 27
- Stats at Baseball Reference

Teams
- Seattle Mariners (2015–2016)

David Dwane Rollins (born December 21, 1989) is an American former professional baseball pitcher. He played in Major League Baseball (MLB) for the Seattle Mariners.

== Career ==
=== Toronto Blue Jays ===
Rollins was drafted in the 2008, 2009 and 2010 Major League Baseball drafts and did not sign either time. After being drafted by the Toronto Blue Jays in the 2011 Draft he signed.

=== Houston Astros ===
In July 2012, he was traded from the Blue Jays to the Houston Astros with Francisco Cordero, Ben Francisco, Asher Wojciechowski, Joe Musgrove, Carlos Pérez, and a player to be named later (Kevin Comer) for J. A. Happ, Brandon Lyon, and David Carpenter.

=== Seattle Mariners ===
The Seattle Mariners selected Rollins from the Astros after the 2014 season in the Rule 5 Draft. On March 27, 2015, Rollins was suspended 80 games for testing positive for stanozolol, a performance-enhancing drug. Rollins was activated from the suspended list and made his major league debut on July 4.

=== Chicago Cubs ===
On November 18, 2016, the Chicago Cubs claimed Rollins off waivers. He was designated for assignment by the Cubs and claimed by the Texas Rangers on November 22. On December 2, the Philadelphia Phillies claimed Rollins off waivers from the Rangers. He was designated for assignment by the Phillies on December 14. On December 21, the Texas Rangers claimed Rollins for the second time.

On December 23, 2016, Rollins was claimed off of waivers by the Chicago Cubs. He was designated for assignment by the Cubs on February 8, 2017. In 32 games for the Triple-A Iowa Cubs, he recorded a 5.79 ERA with 39 strikeouts across 42 innings pitched. On August 4, Rollins was released by the Cubs organization.

=== Sussex County Miners ===
On February 14, 2018, Rollins signed with the Sussex County Miners of the Can-Am League. He made 16 starts for the Miners, compiling a 9–3 record and 2.23 ERA with 105 strikeouts across 113 innings of work.

=== Seattle Mariners (second stint) ===
On August 14, 2018, Rollins' contract was purchased by the Seattle Mariners organization. He made 4 starts for the Triple-A Tacoma Rainiers, struggling to a 9.61 ERA with 17 strikeouts across 19 2/3 innings. He elected free agency following the season on November 2.

== See also ==
- List of Major League Baseball players suspended for performance-enhancing drugs
