= Ben Francisco =

American baseball player (born 1981)

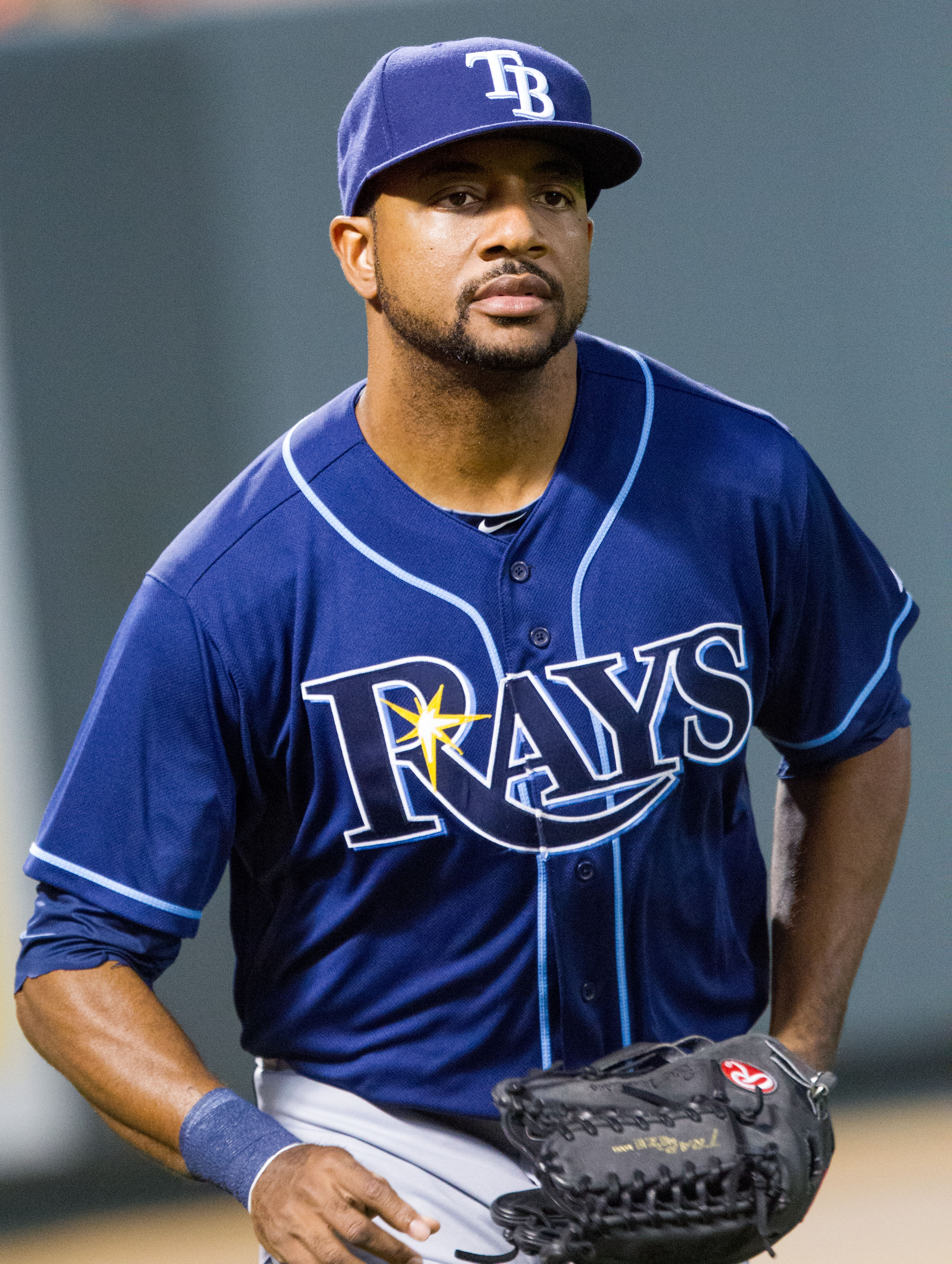
- Francisco with the Rays in 2012
- Outfielder
- Born: October 23, 1981 (age 44); Santa Ana, California, U.S.
- Batted: Right Threw: Right

MLB debut
- May 1, 2007, for the Cleveland Indians

Last MLB appearance
- May 17, 2013, for the New York Yankees

MLB statistics
- Batting average: .253
- Home runs: 50
- Runs batted in: 190
- Stats at Baseball Reference

Teams
- Cleveland Indians (2007–2009); Philadelphia Phillies (2009–2011); Toronto Blue Jays (2012); Houston Astros (2012); Tampa Bay Rays (2012); New York Yankees (2013)

Louis Benjamin Francisco (born October 23, 1981), is an American former professional baseball outfielder, who is currently a major league scout for the Los Angeles Angels. He played in Major League Baseball (MLB) for the Cleveland Indians, Philadelphia Phillies, Toronto Blue Jays, Houston Astros, Tampa Bay Rays, and New York Yankees.

== Early life ==
Francisco is a 1999 graduate of Servite High School, a Roman Catholic high school for boys, in Anaheim, California where he played on the same baseball team as former Indians teammate Ryan Garko. He later attended and played baseball at Cypress Junior College in 2000 and went on to play at the University of California, Los Angeles in 2001 through 2003.

== Professional career ==
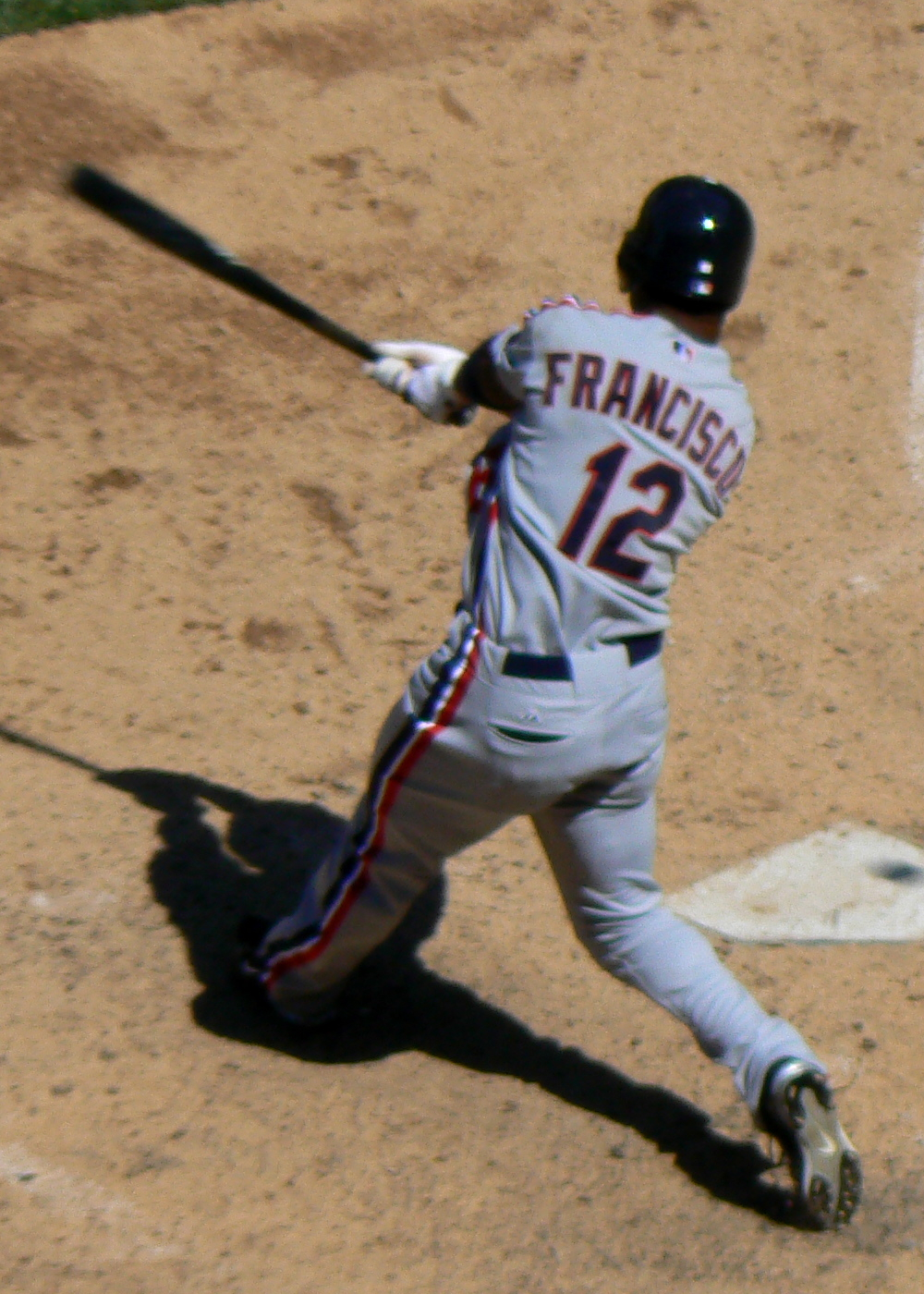
Francisco during his tenure with the Cleveland Indians in 2008.

=== Cleveland Indians ===
Francisco was selected by the Cleveland Indians in the fifth round (154th overall) of the 2002 Major League Baseball draft. He was called up from the Triple-A Buffalo Bisons on May 1, 2007, and made his major league debut that night as a late-game defensive replacement. On June 29, Francisco got his first hit and his first home run in his first major league start. His home run came leading off the bottom of the ninth inning, helping the Indians to a 2–1, walk-off win over the Tampa Bay Devil Rays. Francisco played in 25 games with Cleveland during the 2007 season, batting .278 with three home runs and 12 RBI.

Though Francisco had a strong performance during spring training in 2008 (.362 average, three home runs, 9 RBI, .617 slugging percentage), he was optioned to Triple-A Buffalo on March 27. Francisco was recalled on April 22 when Jake Westbrook was placed on the disabled list. After a two-game stint, he was optioned back to Buffalo, and recalled again on May 6. On June 5 against the Texas Rangers, Francisco became the fourth Indians rookie since 1948 to record five hits in a game, and the first since Tommy Hinzo in 1987. Francisco ultimately finished the season batting .266 with 15 home runs and 54 RBI in 121 games.

Francisco began the 2009 season with a .250 batting average, 10 home runs and 33 RBI in 89 games with Cleveland.

=== Philadelphia Phillies ===
On July 29, 2009, Francisco was traded to the Philadelphia Phillies along with reigning Cy Young Award winner Cliff Lee, for a selection of top minor league prospects including Carlos Carrasco, Jason Donald, Lou Marson, and Jason Knapp. He spent the remainder of 2009 as a reserve outfielder and pinch hitter with the Phillies, playing in 37 games and hitting .278 with five home runs and 13 RBI. Francisco also saw time during Philadelphia's postseason run, going hitless in 11 at bats while recording one walk in 11 games.

In his first full season in Philadelphia, Francisco batted .268 with six home runs and 28 RBI in 88 games. He recorded his first career postseason hit and run scored in the 2010 National League Championship Series, which ended in a series loss to the San Francisco Giants.

On January 15, 2011, Francisco signed a one-year, $1.175 million contract with the Phillies, avoiding arbitration. Following the departure of starting right fielder Jayson Werth, Francisco earned a regular spot in the Phillies' starting lineup at the onset of the 2011 season. By midseason, however, Francisco returned to his reserve role. He batted .244 with six home runs and 34 RBI in 100 games.

Though limited in play during the second half of the year, Francisco had a clutch performance in Game 3 of the 2011 National League Division Series against the St. Louis Cardinals. In a scoreless game, with Shane Victorino on second, the Cardinals elected to intentionally walk Carlos Ruiz in order to face Francisco. After nearly hitting a home run against Jaime Garcia a few weeks earlier, Francisco blasted a 405-foot home run into the Phillies' bullpen. Francisco's home run ended up being the deciding factor as the Phillies defeated the Cardinals 3–2. The Phillies would go on to lose the series to the Cardinals in five games.

=== Toronto Blue Jays ===
On December 12, 2011, Francisco was traded to the Toronto Blue Jays in exchange for minor leaguer Frank Gailey.

=== Houston Astros ===
On July 20, 2012, the Blue Jays traded Francisco, Francisco Cordero, Asher Wojciechowski, David Rollins, Joe Musgrove, Carlos Pérez, and a player to be named later (Kevin Comer) to the Houston Astros for J. A. Happ, Brandon Lyon, and David Carpenter.

=== Tampa Bay Rays ===
On August 31, 2012, the Tampa Bay Rays acquired Francisco for a player to be named later. He finished the 2012 season hitting a combined .240 with four home runs and 15 RBI in 82 games with Toronto, Houston and Tampa Bay.

=== New York Yankees ===
On January 21, 2013, Francisco signed a minor league contract with the Cleveland Indians. The Indians released him on March 11.

On March 11, 2013, Francisco signed a minor league contract with the New York Yankees. He was added to the Yankees' Opening Day roster. He was used as the designated hitter against left-handed pitchers but struggled drastically batting .103 in the month of April. Francisco was designated for assignment on May 26, and was released from the team on June 3. He hit .114 with four runs scored, a home run and RBI in 21 games.

=== Lancaster Barnstormers ===
On June 8, 2014, Francisco signed with the Lancaster Barnstormers of the Atlantic League of Professional Baseball. He was active for the Barnstormers next game the following day against the Camden Riversharks. In 57 games for Lancaster, Francisco slashed .242/.303/.390 with six home runs, 27 RBI, and four stolen bases.

=== Rieleros de Aguascalientes ===
On December 15, 2014, Francisco signed a minor league contract with the Arizona Diamondbacks. On March 15, 2015, he was released by the Diamondbacks.

On May 8, 2015, Francisco signed with the Rieleros de Aguascalientes of the Mexican League. In 14 games for Aguascalientes, he batted .244/.346/.267 with no home runs and five RBI. Francisco was released by the Rieleros on May 24.

== Post-playing career ==
In 2016, Francisco was hired by the Los Angeles Angels as a scout.

In 2022, Francisco was inducted into the Buffalo Baseball Hall of Fame, in recognition of his three seasons with the Buffalo Bisons.
