= Nancy I. Williams =

American sports scientist

- Education: Bucknell University; Boston University; Ohio State University
- Scientific career
- Workplaces: Pennsylvania State University; University of Pittsburgh
- Thesis: Effects of exercise combined with caloric restriction on luteinizing hormone pulsatility (1992)

Nancy I. Williams is an American kinesiologist who is a professor at Pennsylvania State University. Her research considers the physiological mechanisms that underpin energy balance, exercise performance and bone health. She is a former president of the American Kinesiology Association and Fellow of the American College of Sports Medicine.

== Early life and education ==
Williams is from New Jersey. She attended Shawnee High School. Williams studied biology at Bucknell University before moving to Ohio State University for a graduate degree. Williams moved to the Boston University for her doctoral research, where she focussed on anatomy and physiology. After earning her doctoral degree, Williams moved to the University of Pittsburgh, where she worked as a postdoctoral researcher in reproductive sciences.

== Research and career ==
Williams studies women's health and exercise. In 1997, Williams joined the faculty at Pennsylvania State University, where she was promoted to full professor in 2009. In 2012 Williams was made Head of Department of Kinesiology at the Pennsylvania State University College of Health and Human Development. Her research includes randomized controlled trials to understand the female athlete triad. She has shown that up to 60% of women recreational athletes experience menstrual dysfunction. She has explored how weight loss impacts the acute-exercise induced suppression of appetite. She serves on the Board of Directors of the Female and Male Athlete Triad.

In 2019 Williams was elected President of the American Kinesiology Association.

== Awards and honours ==
- 1994 National Institutes of Health Individual National Research Service Award
- 1998 Elected Fellow of the American College of Sports Medicine
- 2001 Department of Defense Breast Cancer Research Program Career Development Award
- 2011 Elected Fellow of the National Academy of Kinesiology

== Selected publications ==
- Souza, Mary Jane De; Nattiv, Aurelia; Joy, Elizabeth; Misra, Madhusmita; Williams, Nancy I.; Mallinson, Rebecca J.; Gibbs, Jenna C.; Olmsted, Marion; Goolsby, Marci; Matheson, Gordon; Panel, Expert (2014-02-01). "2014 Female Athlete Triad Coalition Consensus Statement on Treatment and Return to Play of the Female Athlete Triad: 1st International Conference held in San Francisco, California, May 2012 and 2nd International Conference held in Indianapolis, Indiana, May 2013". British Journal of Sports Medicine. 48 (4): 289. doi:10.1136/bjsports-2013-093218. ISSN 0306-3674. PMID 24463911.
- Williams, Nancy I.; Helmreich, Dana L.; Parfitt, David B.; Caston-Balderrama, Anne; Cameron, Judy L. (2001). "Evidence for a Causal Role of Low Energy Availability in the Induction of Menstrual Cycle Disturbances during Strenuous Exercise Training". The Journal of Clinical Endocrinology & Metabolism. 86 (11): 5184–5193. doi:10.1210/jcem.86.11.8024. ISSN 0021-972X. PMID 11701675.
- De Souza, Mary Jane; Leidy, Heather J.; O’Donnell, Emma; Lasley, Bill; Williams, Nancy I. (2004). "Fasting Ghrelin Levels in Physically Active Women: Relationship with Menstrual Disturbances and Metabolic Hormones". The Journal of Clinical Endocrinology & Metabolism. 89 (7): 3536–3542. doi:10.1210/jc.2003-032007. ISSN 0021-972X. PMID 15240643.
