= Carlos Pérez (catcher, born 1990) =

Venezuelan baseball player (born 1990)

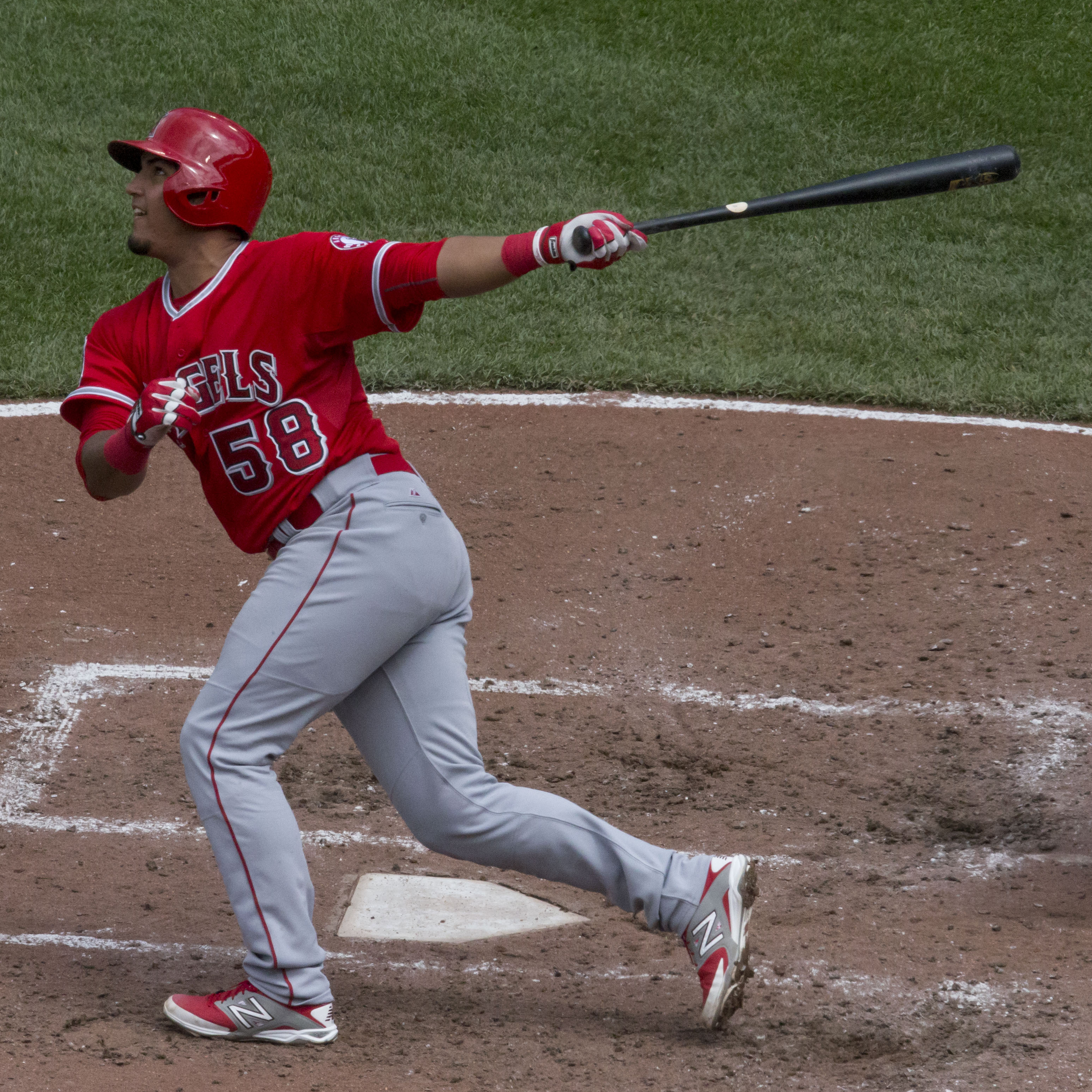
- Pérez with the Los Angeles Angels in 2015

Detroit Tigers
- Catcher
- Born: October 27, 1990 (age 36); Valencia, Venezuela
- Bats: Right Throws: Right

MLB debut
- May 5, 2015, for the Los Angeles Angels of Anaheim

MLB statistics (through 2023 season)
- Batting average: .218
- Home runs: 17
- Runs batted in: 78
- Stats at Baseball Reference

Teams
- Los Angeles Angels of Anaheim / Los Angeles Angels (2015–2017); Atlanta Braves (2018); Texas Rangers (2018); Oakland Athletics (2023)

Carlos Eduardo Pérez Álvarez (born October 27, 1990) is a Venezuelan professional baseball catcher in the Detroit Tigers organization. He has previously played in Major League Baseball (MLB) for the Los Angeles Angels, Atlanta Braves, Texas Rangers, and Oakland Athletics.

== Career ==
=== Toronto Blue Jays ===
On January 2, 2008, Pérez signed with the Toronto Blue Jays as an international free agent. He made his professional debut with the Dominican Summer League Blue Jays, hitting .306 across 58 contests. In 2009, Pérez played in 43 games for the rookie–level Gulf Coast Blue Jays, batting .291/.364/.433 with 1 home run and 21 RBI.

Pérez spent the 2010 season with the Low–A Auburn Doubledays, playing in 66 games and hitting .298/.396/.438 with 2 home runs and 41 RBI. In 2011, Pérez played for the Single–A Lansing Lugnuts, appearing in 95 games and slashing .256/.320/.355 with 3 home runs and 41 RBI. He returned to Lansing to begin the 2012 season, hitting .275 across 71 appearances.

=== Houston Astros ===
On July 20, 2012, the Blue Jays traded Pérez, Francisco Cordero, Ben Francisco, Asher Wojciechowski, David Rollins, Joe Musgrove and a player to be named later (Kevin Comer) to the Houston Astros in exchange for J. A. Happ, Brandon Lyon, and David Carpenter. He played in 26 games for the High–A Lancaster JetHawks to close out the year. Pérez split the 2013 season between the Double–A Corpus Christi Hooks and Triple–A Oklahoma City RedHawks. In 91 games, he accumulated a .271/.332/.357 batting line with 3 home runs and 37 RBI.

In 2014, Pérez played in 88 games for Triple–A Oklahoma City, hitting .259/.323/.385 with 6 home runs and 34 RBI. On November 3, 2014, the Astros added Pérez to their 40-man roster to protect him from the Rule 5 draft.

=== Los Angeles Angels of Anaheim / Los Angeles Angels ===
On November 5, 2014, the Astros traded Pérez and Nick Tropeano to the Los Angeles Angels of Anaheim in exchange for Hank Conger.

Pérez was promoted to the major leagues on May 4, 2015, to back up Chris Iannetta. In his major league debut on May 5, 2015, he hit a walk-off home run off of Dominic Leone giving the Angels a 5–4 victory over the Seattle Mariners. At the time, Perez was the fourth player ever to his a walk-off in his MLB debut. He finished the season hitting .250 with 4 home runs in 86 games. The following season, he hit .209 in 87 games. In 2017, he played the majority of the season with the Triple–A Salt Lake Bees, he was promoted when rosters expanded in September. Pérez was designated for assignment on March 28, 2018, in order to make room for Shohei Ohtani on the Angels roster.

=== Atlanta Braves ===
On March 31, 2018, Pérez was traded to the Atlanta Braves in exchange for Ryan Schimpf. He appeared in eight games for the Braves, going 3-for-21 with a walk. The Braves designated Pérez for assignment on April 27, after Tyler Flowers was activated from the injured list.

=== Texas Rangers ===
On May 2, 2018, Pérez was claimed off waivers by the Texas Rangers. He played in 20 games for Texas, hitting .143/.177/.245 with one home run and 3 RBI. On July 16, Pérez was removed from the 40-man roster and sent outright to the Triple-A Round Rock Express. In 22 games for Round Rock, Pérez batted .317/.368/.494 with 4 home runs and 13 RBI. He elected free agency after the season on November 2.

=== Baltimore Orioles ===
On January 7, 2019, Pérez signed a minor league deal with the Baltimore Orioles organization. He spent the majority of the year with the Double-A Bowie Baysox, also appearing briefly for the Triple-A Norfolk Tides. In 102 total games, Pérez hit .243/.293/.417 with 14 home runs and 60 RBI. He elected minor league free agency after the season on November 4.

=== Oakland Athletics ===
On November 25, 2019, Pérez signed a minor league contract, that included an invite to major league spring training, with the Oakland Athletics. Pérez did not play in a game in 2020 due to the cancellation of the minor league season because of the COVID-19 pandemic. He became a free agent on November 2, 2020.

On January 29, 2021, Pérez re-signed with the Athletics organization and was invited to spring training. Pérez spent the 2021 season with the Triple-A Las Vegas Aviators. He played in 97 games, hitting .269/.337/.572 with 31 home runs and 89 RBI. He became a free agent following the season on November 7.

=== Colorado Rockies ===
On February 6, 2022, Pérez signed a minor league contract with the Colorado Rockies. Pérez played in 117 games for the Triple-A Albuquerque Isotopes, slashing .254/.341/.524 with 31 home runs and 87 RBIs. He elected free agency on November 10.

=== Oakland Athletics (second stint) ===
On March 16, 2023, Pérez signed with the Acereros de Monclova of the Mexican League. However, on March 19, Pérez signed a minor league contract to return to the Oakland Athletics organization. On March 30, Pérez had his contract selected after making the Opening Day roster. In 66 games for the Athletics, he batted .226/.293/.357 with 6 home runs and 20 RBI. On October 12, Pérez was removed from the 40–man roster and sent outright to the Triple-A Las Vegas Aviators. On October 16, Pérez elected free agency.

Pérez re–signed with the Athletics on a minor league contract on January 5, 2024. In 112 games for Triple–A Las Vegas, he slashed .260/.344/.544 with 27 home runs and 77 RBI. Perez elected free agency following the season on November 4.

=== Chicago Cubs ===
On December 22, 2024, Pérez signed a minor league contract with the Chicago Cubs. He made 111 appearances for the Triple-A Iowa Cubs in 2025, slashing .286/.372/.572 with 27 home runs and 87 RBI. Pérez elected free agency following the season on November 6, 2025.

=== Houston Astros (second stint) ===
On November 28, 2025, Pérez signed a minor league contract with the Houston Astros. He made 57 appearances for the Triple-A Sugar Land Space Cowboys in 2026, batting .222/.303/.396 with eight home runs and 28 RBI. On June 18, 2026, Pérez was released by the organization.

=== El Águila de Veracruz ===
On July 1, 2026, Pérez signed with El Águila de Veracruz of the Mexican League. In 14 appearances for the team, he batted .190/.306/.333 with one home run and six RBI. On July 17, Pérez was released by Veracruz.

=== Detroit Tigers ===
On July 22, 2026, Pérez signed a minor league contract with the Detroit Tigers. Pérez was subsequently assigned to the Triple–A Toledo Mud Hens. In 12 games he batted .351/.467/.946 with 7 home runs and 16 RBIs.

On October 28, 2026, Pérez re-signed with the Tigers on a new minor league contract for the 2027 season.

== Personal life ==
Pérez's brother, Carlos Jesus Pérez, also played in MLB for the Chicago White Sox.

== See also ==
- List of Major League Baseball players from Venezuela
