= Seneca High School (New Jersey) =

High school in Burlington County, New Jersey, US

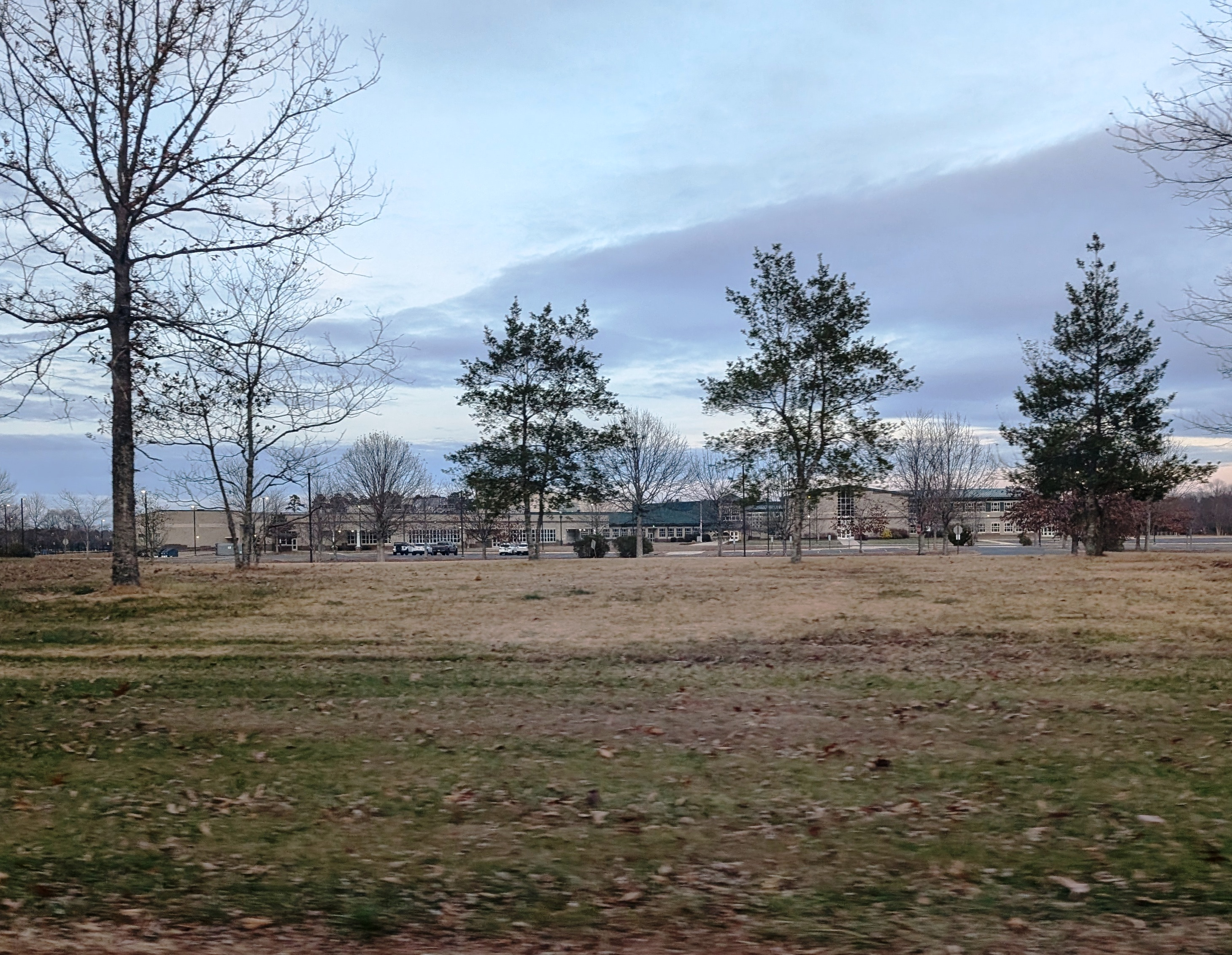
- Front of the school

Location
- 110 Carranza Road; Tabernacle Township, Burlington County, New Jersey 08088; United States; 39.8570°N 74.7177°W

Information
- Type: Public high school
- Established: 2003
- School district: Lenape Regional High School District
- NCES School ID: 340849000701
- Principal: David New
- Faculty: 101.0 FTEs
- Grades: 9-12
- Enrollment: 1,037 (as of 2023–24)
- Student to teacher ratio: 10.3:1
- Colors: Vegas gold and forest green
- Athletics conference: Olympic Conference (general); West Jersey Football League (football)
- Team name: Golden Eagles
- Accreditation: Middle States Association of Colleges and Schools
- Newspaper: The Bird's Eye View
- Website: seneca.lrhsd.org

Seneca High School is a four-year comprehensive public high school in Burlington County, New Jersey that operates as part of the Lenape Regional High School District. The district serves students in ninth through twelfth grades from Shamong Township, Southampton Township, Tabernacle Township and Woodland Township. Seneca High School serves students from four of the communities: Shamong Township, Southampton Township, Tabernacle Township and Woodland Township. Seneca is the newest of the Lenape Regional High School District's four high schools. The school is accredited until January 2030 and has been accredited by the Middle States Association of Colleges and Schools Commission on Elementary and Secondary Schools since 2008.

As of the 2023–24 school year, the school had an enrollment of 1,037 students and 101.0 classroom teachers (on an FTE basis), for a student–teacher ratio of 10.3:1. There were 108 students (10.4% of enrollment) eligible for free lunch and 41 (4.0% of students) eligible for reduced-cost lunch.

== History ==
Approved by voters in 1997, Seneca High School was established as the district's fourth high school. The 255,000-square-foot (23,700 m^{2}) facility was initially expected to be completed by 2000, constructed on a 201-acre (81 ha) site designed to accommodate 2,000 students. However, the school ultimately opened in September 2003 with 860 students from Shamong, Southampton, Tabernacle, and Woodland Townships. The total cost of construction amounted to $45.7 million (equivalent to $71.0 million in 2025), with delays caused by lawsuits related to the building site in the Pinelands resulting in budget overruns of $8.7 million.

The district chose the name "Seneca High School" in December 2000, continuing the practice of assigning Native American names to its schools. Seneca was selected due to its traditional presence in the area. Additionally, the nickname "Golden Eagles" was chosen from a variety of animal-based alternatives, rather than selecting a nickname related to Native Americans, as had been done with the district's three other schools.

The opening of Seneca High School allowed enrollment levels at Lenape High School and Shawnee High School to decrease, helping to alleviate the overcrowding both schools had experienced. Based on the number of students who opted to switch to Seneca, the school's first graduating class in 2005 was expected to consist of 150 students.

== Awards, recognition and rankings ==
The school was the 111th-ranked public high school in New Jersey out of 339 schools statewide in New Jersey Monthly magazine's September 2014 cover story on the state's "Top Public High Schools", using a new ranking methodology. The school had been ranked 119th in the state of 328 schools in 2012, after being ranked 135th in 2010 out of 322 schools listed. The magazine ranked the school 134th in 2008 out of 316 schools. The school was ranked 258th in the magazine's September 2006 issue, which surveyed 316 schools across the state.

Schooldigger.com ranked the school 82nd out of 381 public high schools statewide in its 2011 rankings (an increase of 14 positions from the 2010 ranking) which were based on the combined percentage of students classified as proficient or above proficient on the mathematics (89.5%) and language arts literacy (95.9%) components of the High School Proficiency Assessment (HSPA).

== Athletics ==
The Seneca High School Golden Eagles participate in the Olympic Conference (New Jersey), which is comprised of public and private high schools in Burlington and Camden counties and operates under the auspices of the New Jersey State Interscholastic Athletic Association (NJSIAA). With 856 students in grades 10-12, the school was classified by the NJSIAA for the 2019–20 school year as Group III for most athletic competition purposes. This category includes schools with an enrollment of 761 to 1,058 students in that grade range. The football team competes in the National Division of the 94-team West Jersey Football League superconference and was classified by the NJSIAA as Group III South for football for 2024–2026, which included schools with 695 to 882 students.

Seneca offers an abundance of activities to its students through its sports programs. The school goes by the nickname the Golden Eagles, which was chosen by the district in December 2000 as a departure from the Native American-themed nicknames of the other three schools.

The boys' track team, coached by Rich Watson, a physics teacher at Seneca, has enjoyed success with standouts such as the 2006 shuttle hurdle team and record-setting performances by Drew Kanz-Oshea in the High Jump: 7'1 (2009), and Michael Maira in the Pole Vault: 15'0" (2008-2010). Both were multiple-time state champions.

The 2006 football team reached the South Jersey Group III final but lost to Lacey Township High School 12–0. The loss ended the team's undefeated season. The team finished 11–1, ranked #1 among South Jersey Large Schools by the Courier-Post.. They would win their first sectional title in 2026, defeating Pinelands 29-13 in the final.

The 2006 girls' tennis team won the South Jersey Group III state sectional championship with a pair of 5-0 wins, defeating Ocean City High School in the semifinals and Shawnee High School in the finals.

The baseball team won the Group III state championship in 2007 (defeating Cranford High School in the tournament final) and 2011 (vs. Paramus High School). The baseball team also won the 2007 Group III title, defeating Ocean Township High School 5–4 in the semifinals and Cranford High School by a score of 5–2 in the group final. The team again won the Group III state championship in 2011, defeating Paramus High School by a score of 12–3 in the tournament final.

The girls' track team won the winter / indoor track Group III state championship in 2009 (as co-champion) and 2010.

The girls' track team also won the Group III state indoor relay championship in 2009.

The 2014 and 2015 boys' lacrosse teams advanced to the South Jersey Group II state championship games. Attackman Kevin Gray was named a 2015 US Lacrosse High School All American.

In 2016, Joe Manchio became the school's first individual state champion in wrestling at Boardwalk Hall in Atlantic City. He won the 106-pound state title, defeating Paulsboro High School's Nick Duca 5–4.

The field hockey team won the Central Jersey Group II state sectional championship from 2017 to 2019.

== Administration ==
The school's principal is David New. His core administration team includes five assistant principals.

== Notable alumni ==
- Kevin Comer (born 1992, class of 2011), professional baseball pitcher is a free agent
- Nick Decker (born 1999, class of 2018), professional baseball outfielder in the Boston Red Sox organization
- Sonya Deville (born 1993, class of 2011), stage name of wrestler Daria Berenato, signed to WWE under the WWE SmackDown brand.

== Notable faculty ==
- Jay Black (born 1976), comedian, screenwriter and actor.

== Other schools in the district ==
Other schools in the district (with 2023–24 enrollment data from the National Center for Education Statistics) are:

- Cherokee High School - located in Evesham Township, with 2,108 students from Evesham Township
- Lenape High School - located in Medford Township, with 1,922 students from Mount Laurel Township
- Shawnee High School - located in Medford Township, with 1,418 students from Medford Lakes and Medford Township
