= Kacey Carrig =

American model

- Born: April 10, 1992 (age 34); Shamong, New Jersey, U.S.
- Education: The College of New Jersey
- Modelling information
- Height: 6 ft 2 in (1.88 m)
- Hair colour: Light Brown
- Eye colour: Blue
- Agency: Ford (NY) Premier (London)

Kacey Carrig (born April 10, 1992) is an American model.

== Career ==
Carrig was raised in Shamong Township, New Jersey. During his college education he decided to pursue a modelling career and contacted some agencies. Ford agency asked him to enter the "VMan 2011 model search", in which he became a finalist and subsequently got a contract.

In 2012, Versace enlisted him for the brand's F/W ’12 campaign. Since then, he has worked for a number of editorial ad campaigns and modeled for shows like Mert & Marcus, Ermano Scervino, Italian GQ, and Parke & Ronen. He has also modeled for Bloomingdale's, Milan Vukmirovic, Chevignon and Tom Ford. Carrig has a Bachelor's Degree in Business Marketing from The College of New Jersey.

Carrig currently resides in Watchung, New Jersey and is a realtor for Sotheby's.
