= Asher Wojciechowski =

American baseball player (born 1988)

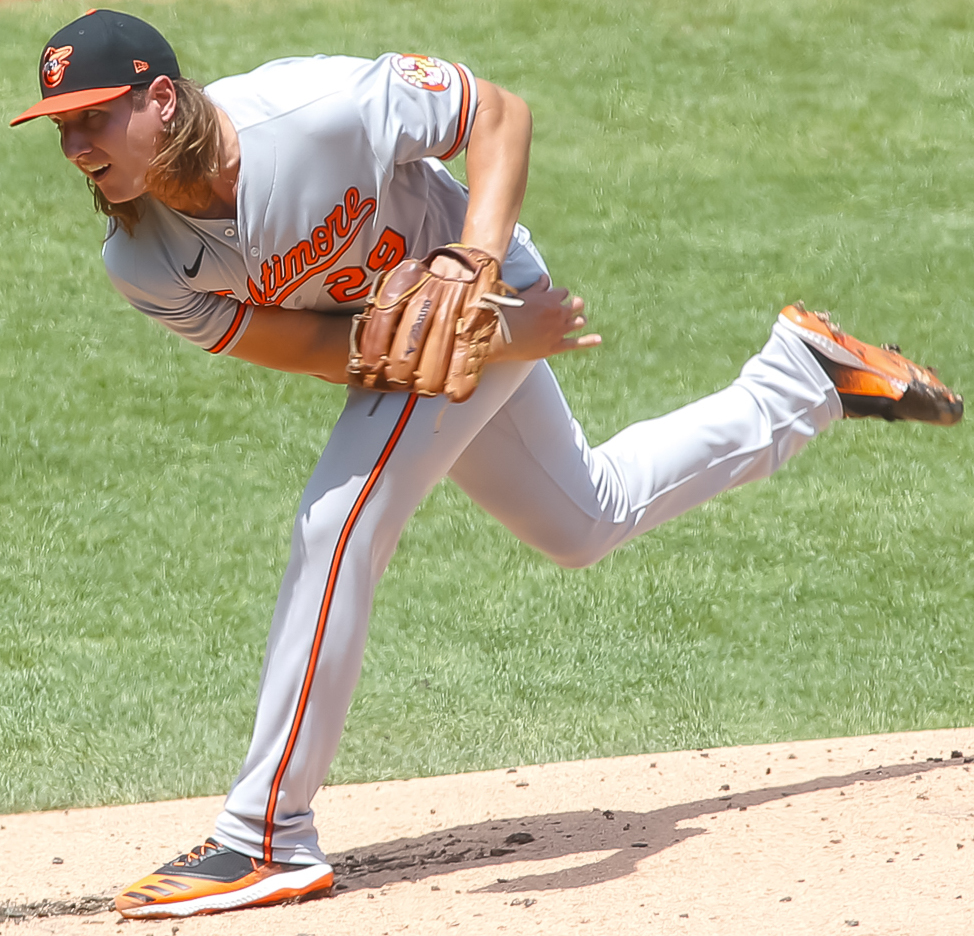
- Wojciechowski with the Orioles in 2020
- Pitcher
- Born: December 21, 1988 (age 37); Hardeeville, South Carolina, U.S.
- Batted: Right Threw: Right

MLB debut
- April 9, 2015, for the Houston Astros

Last MLB appearance
- July 21, 2021, for the New York Yankees

MLB statistics
- Win–loss record: 9–15
- Earned run average: 5.93
- Strikeouts: 195
- Stats at Baseball Reference

Teams
- Houston Astros (2015); Cincinnati Reds (2017); Baltimore Orioles (2019–2020); New York Yankees (2021)

Randall Asher Wojciechowski (/vɔɪtʃɛˈhɔːvski/ voy-cheh-HAWV-skee; born December 21, 1988) is an American former professional baseball pitcher. He played in Major League Baseball (MLB) for the Houston Astros, Cincinnati Reds, Baltimore Orioles, and New York Yankees.

== Early life ==
Wojciechowski was born in Hardeeville, South Carolina. In his younger years, he lived in Pensacola, Florida, Sturgis, Michigan, and the Dominican Republic. The Wojciechowskis moved to Romania when Asher was nine. Living abroad, he played soccer, and joined Little League Baseball when it expanded to Bucharest when he was 11. The team played in a tournament similar to the Little League World Series in Poland.

After living in Romania for three years, the family moved to Sturgis, Michigan. Wojciechowski attended Sturgis High School, where he played for the school's baseball team. He also played high school football for one season. The family moved to South Carolina for Asher's senior year of high school, so that he could attract more attention from scouts. Wojciechowski attended Beaufort High School in Beaufort, South Carolina, for his senior year of high school.

After graduating from high school, Wojciechowski then enrolled at The Citadel, choosing it over Winthrop University. He competed for the United States national baseball team in the summer of 2009. In 2010, he was named the Southern Conference's pitcher of the year.

== Professional career ==
=== Toronto Blue Jays ===
The Toronto Blue Jays selected Wojciechowski in the first round, with the 41st overall selection, of the 2010 Major League Baseball draft. He received an $815,000 signing bonus, and made his professional debut with the Auburn Doubledays of the Class A-Short Season New York–Penn League. In 2011, Wojciechowski played for the Dunedin Blue Jays of the Class A-Advanced Florida State League. The Blue Jays assigned Wojciechowski to Dunedin in 2012.

=== Houston Astros ===
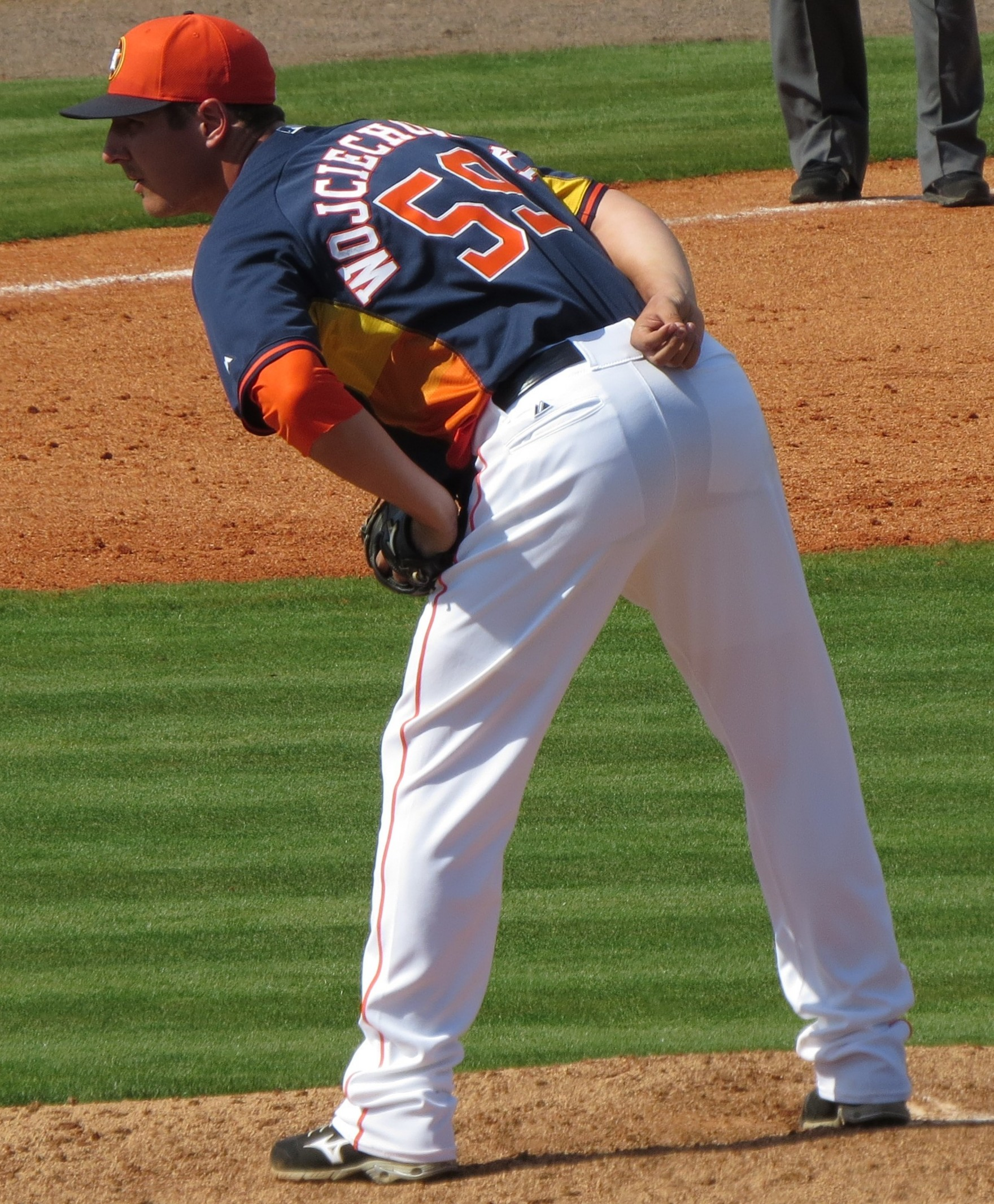
Wojciechowski pitching for Astros in 2015 spring training

The Blue Jays later traded Wojciechowski, along with Ben Francisco, Francisco Cordero, David Rollins, Joe Musgrove, Carlos Pérez, and a player to be named later (Kevin Comer) to the Houston Astros on July 20, 2012, in exchange for J. A. Happ, Brandon Lyon, and David Carpenter. Houston assigned Wojciechowski to the Corpus Christi Hooks of the Double–A Texas League. He started the 2013 season in Corpus Christi, but received a midseason promotion to the Oklahoma City RedHawks of the Triple–A Pacific Coast League. On November 20, 2013, the Astros added Wojciechowski to their 40-man roster to protect him from the Rule 5 draft. Before spring training began in 2014, Wojciechowski strained a lateral muscle. While recuperating in May, his return was delayed when he strained his forearm. He returned to Oklahoma City in June.

Wojciechowski began the 2015 season in the Astros' starting rotation. He made 5 appearances for the Astros in the 2015 season, 3 of which were starts, and pitched to a 0–1 record, 7.16 ERA, and 16 strikeouts in 16 1/3 innings. He was designated for assignment on May 17, 2016.

=== Miami Marlins ===
On May 24, 2016, Wojciechowski was claimed off waivers by the Miami Marlins. He was designated for assignment on July 16. Wojciechowski spent the remainder of the year with the Triple–A New Orleans Zephyrs, also making two starts for the Double–A Jacksonville Suns, and recorded a 5.26 ERA with 32 strikeouts across 13 games (10 starts). He elected free agency following the season on November 7.

=== Arizona Diamondbacks ===
On December 12, 2016, Wojciechowski signed a minor league contract with the Arizona Diamondbacks. The Diamondbacks released him towards the end of spring training in 2017.

=== Cincinnati Reds ===
On April 20, 2017, Wojciechowski signed a minor league contract with the Cincinnati Reds. He began the season with the Louisville Bats of the Triple–A International League. On May 20, the Reds selected Wojciechowski's contract, adding him to their active roster. Wojciechowski earned his first MLB win that day over the Colorado Rockies, pitching 3 2/3 innings while allowing one hit and striking out three. He would appear in 25 games for the Reds that season, collecting 6 wins against 4 losses. His E.R.A was 6.50, while appearing as both a starting pitcher and relief pitcher. On October 4, Wojciechowski was removed from the 40-man roster and sent outright to Triple-A Louisville. He elected free agency two days later.

=== Baltimore Orioles ===
On December 1, 2017, Wojciechowski signed a minor league contract with the Baltimore Orioles. He was assigned to the Norfolk Tides of the International League for the 2018 season. On July 18, Wojciechowski opted-out of his contract and became a free agent.

=== Chicago White Sox ===
On July 25, 2018, Wojciechowski signed a minor league contract with the Chicago White Sox. In 6 starts for the Triple–A Charlotte Knights, he struggled to an 0–5 record and 7.01 ERA with 37 strikeouts across 34 2/3 innings. Wojciechowski elected free agency following the season on November 2.

=== Cleveland Indians ===
Wojciechowski signed a minor league contract with the Cleveland Indians on February 14, 2019. The deal included an invitation to the Indians' major league spring training camp. Wojciechowski spent the first half of the 2019 season with the Columbus Clippers, going 8–2 with a 3.61 ERA in 15 starts.

=== Baltimore Orioles (second stint) ===
Wojciechowski returned to the Orioles in a cash transaction with the Indians on July 1, 2019, and was assigned back to the Tides. On July 2, the Orioles selected his contract and promoted him to the major league roster. Starting 16 of 17 pitching appearances, he had a 4–8 record with a 4.92 ERA and 1.312 WHIP. On September 17, 2020, the Orioles designated Wojciechowski for assignment. On October 14, 2020, Wojciechowski elected free agency.

=== New York Yankees ===
On January 21, 2021, Wojciechowski signed a minor league contract with the New York Yankees organization and was invited to spring training. Wojciechowski left a spring training outing with lat discomfort, and missed the first month of the minor league season before making his season debut with the Triple-A Scranton/Wilkes-Barre RailRiders in June. On July 21, the Yankees selected Wojciechowski to the majors to start against the Philadelphia Phillies. In his only start for the Yankees, Wojciechowski pitched 4 innings, gave up 2 runs, and struck out 4 batters. He was designated for assignment the following day. On July 24, Wojciechowski was outrighted to Triple-A Scranton, but rejected the assignment and elected free agency.

=== Seattle Mariners ===
On July 29, 2021, Wojciechowski signed a minor league contract with the Seattle Mariners. Wojciechowski made 5 starts in 2021 for the Triple-A Tacoma Rainiers, going 0–1 with a 5.82 ERA and 27 strikeouts.

Wojciechowski made 9 appearances for Tacoma in 2022, going 0–4 with an 8.77 ERA and 23 strikeouts. On June 5, 2022, Wojciechowski was released by the Mariners.

== Pitching style ==
His repertoire includes a fastball around 94 miles per hour (151 km/h), a slider in the low to mid 80s, and an occasional changeup and curveball.

== Personal life ==
Wojciechowski is married to his wife, Alanna. His father-in-law is American football coach Paul Hamilton.
