= Brandon Lyon =

American baseball pitcher (born 1979)

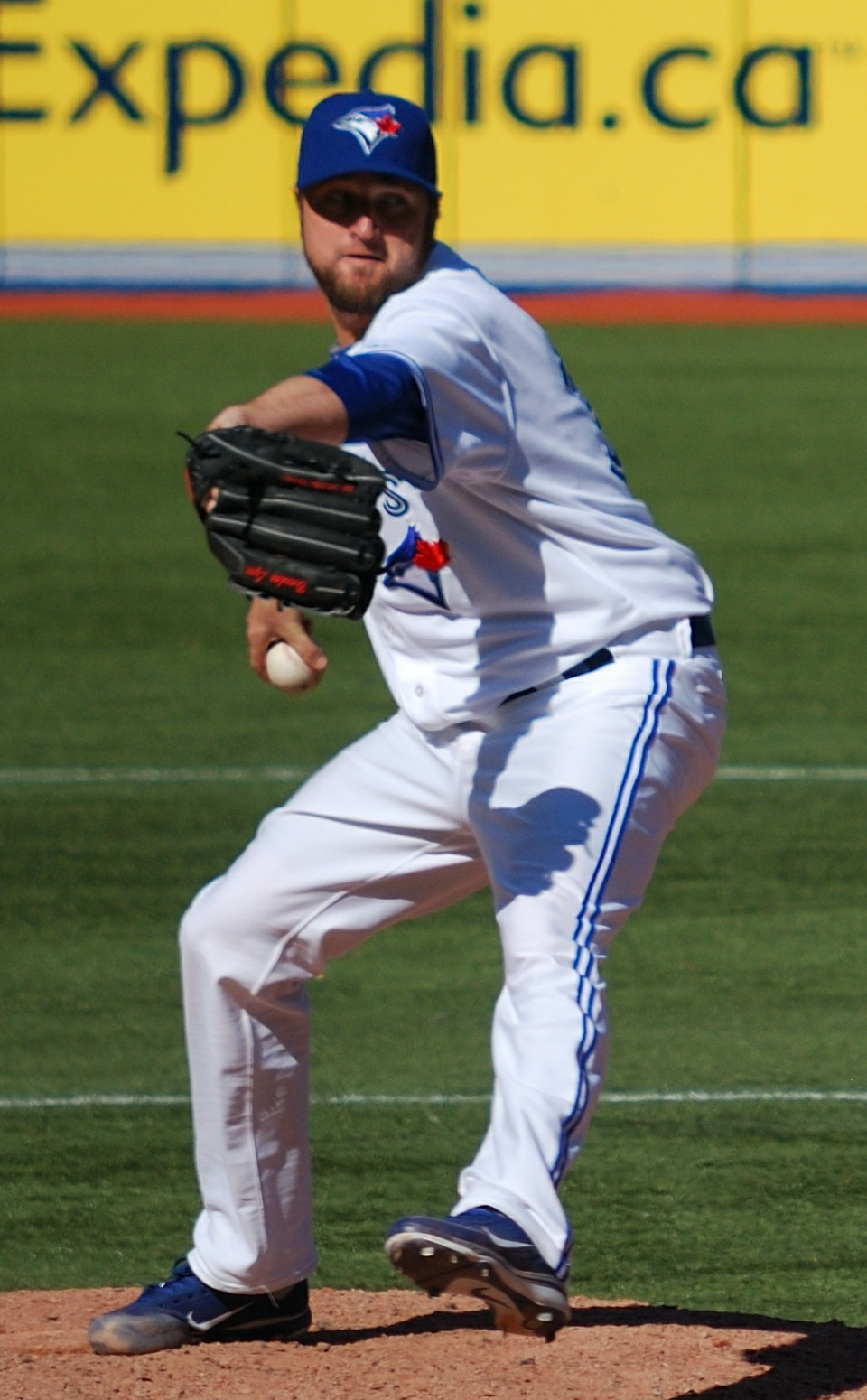
- Lyon with the Toronto Blue Jays
- Pitcher
- Born: August 10, 1979 (age 47); Salt Lake City, Utah, U.S.
- Batted: Right Threw: Right

MLB debut
- August 4, 2001, for the Toronto Blue Jays

Last MLB appearance
- July 4, 2013, for the New York Mets

MLB statistics
- Win–loss record: 42–47
- Earned run average: 4.16
- Strikeouts: 465
- Saves: 79
- Stats at Baseball Reference

Teams
- Toronto Blue Jays (2001–2002); Boston Red Sox (2003); Arizona Diamondbacks (2005–2008); Detroit Tigers (2009); Houston Astros (2010–2012); Toronto Blue Jays (2012); New York Mets (2013)

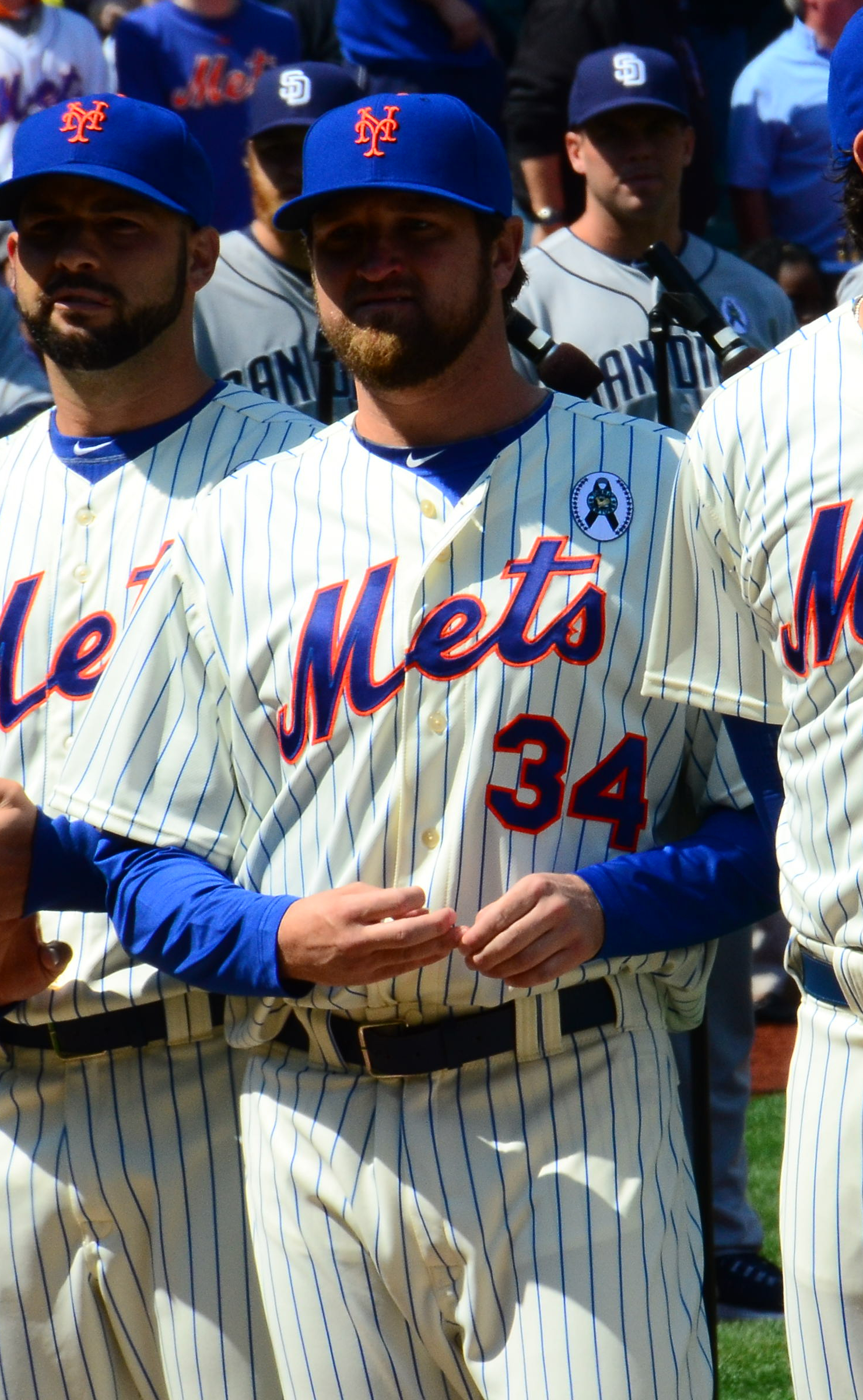
Lyon with the New York Mets

Brandon James Lyon (born August 10, 1979) is an American former professional baseball pitcher. He played in Major League Baseball (MLB) for the Toronto Blue Jays, Boston Red Sox, Arizona Diamondbacks, Detroit Tigers, Houston Astros, and New York Mets.

== Professional career ==
=== Toronto Blue Jays ===
Lyon made his major league debut halfway through the 2001 season, posting a five-win, four-loss record for the Toronto Blue Jays, with a 4.29 ERA from 11 starts. He was the second youngest winning pitcher in Blue Jays' history after winning on debut (2–1 over Baltimore).

2002, however, was a different story. Lyon started the season as a starter for the Jays, but lost three of his first four decisions of the season, including a career-high 7 earned runs against the Yankees on April 10, and against the Angels on May 3. Three weeks later, Lyon was kicked from the rotation, and placed in the bullpen. He made his debut in this role at the SkyDome, against Boston, pitching 3 1/3 innings. In five games of relief, Lyon had no decisions against him with a 5.19 ERA.

=== Boston Red Sox ===
During the postseason, the Red Sox claimed Lyon off waivers.

Boston made Lyon a permanent reliever, and Lyon appeared in 49 games in 2003, converting 9 saves in 12 opportunities with 50 strikeouts in 59 innings pitched. Lyon missed the entire 2004 season due to injury, after having been traded along with Casey Fossum, Michael Goss and Jorge de la Rosa to Arizona in exchange for Curt Schilling.

=== Arizona Diamondbacks ===
Lyon improved in 2005, converting 14 saves in 15 opportunities while pitching in 32 games and spending part of the season as the Diamondbacks' closer, replacing the injured José Valverde. However, he spent most of the second half on the disabled list. In 2006, Lyon had a very solid season, posting a 2–4 record and a 3.89 ERA in 68 appearances. In 2007, Lyon had probably his best season yet, with a 6–4 record, 2 saves, and the best ERA of his career, at a sparkling 2.68 in 73 games. Lyon found his niche as the Diamondbacks' primary setup man, pitching in front of Valverde, as Arizona won the NL West division title. For most of 2008, Lyon served as the closer for the Diamondbacks following the offseason trade of Valverde to the Houston Astros. However, he lost the job to Chad Qualls following second-half struggles.

=== Detroit Tigers ===
On January 24, 2009, the Detroit Tigers signed Lyon to a one-year contract. Lyon's Tiger season started off horrendously: Lyon compiled an ERA of 4.91 in April and a whopping 8.10 in May. From June on, Lyon redeemed himself somewhat by compiling a 1.56 ERA in 57 2/3 innings. Lyon was used as a set-up man for Tigers closer Fernando Rodney. On November 10, 2009, Lyon filed for free agency.

=== Houston Astros ===
On December 12, 2009, Lyon signed with the Houston Astros to a 3-year deal, worth $15 million.

=== Toronto Blue Jays (second stint) ===
On July 20, 2012, Lyon was traded to the Blue Jays, along with J. A. Happ, and David Carpenter, for Francisco Cordero, Ben Francisco, Asher Wojciechowski, David Rollins, Joe Musgrove, Carlos Pérez, and a player to be named later (Kevin Comer). He became a free agent following the season.

=== New York Mets ===
On February 7, 2013, it was announced that the New York Mets and Lyon had reached an agreement on a one-year contract, which became official on February 8. Lyon was designated for assignment on July 5, 2013. On July 9, Lyon was released.

=== Boston Red Sox (second stint) ===
On July 19, 2013, Lyon signed a minor league contract with the Boston Red Sox. He was released on August 1.

=== Los Angeles Angels of Anaheim ===
On February 10, 2014, Lyon signed a minor league contract with the Los Angeles of Anaheim. On May 20, 2014, Lyon elected free agency after spending all season in Triple-A.

== Pitching style ==
Lyon used an arsenal of five pitches: a four-seam fastball at 90–92 mph, a two-seamer at 90–91, a cutter at 89–91, and a curveball at 78–80. Occasionally, he also throws a changeup to left-handed hitters (85–87). Lyon's most commonly thrown pitch to right-handed hitters (and overall) is the cutter, while his lead pitch against lefties is the two-seamer. The curve is his most common 2-strike pitch.

== Personal life ==
Lyon's son, Isaac, is also a baseball player in the Washington Nationals organization.

== See also ==
- Best pitching seasons by a Detroit Tiger
