= Kevin Comer =

American baseball player (born 1992)

- Pitcher
- Born: August 1, 1992 (age 33); Shamong Township, New Jersey, U.S.
- Bats: Right Throws: Right

Kevin James Comer (born August 1, 1992) is an American former professional baseball pitcher.

== Career ==
Comer is a native of Shamong Township, New Jersey, and attended Seneca High School in Tabernacle Township, New Jersey.

=== Toronto Blue Jays ===
The Toronto Blue Jays selected him in the first round, with the 57th overall selection, of the 2011 MLB draft. He signed with the Blue Jays, receiving a $1.65 million signing bonus agreed to ten minutes before the signing deadline, rather than enroll at Vanderbilt University. He made his professional debut that season with the Bluefield Blue Jays of the Rookie-level Appalachian League.

=== Houston Astros ===
On August 16, 2012, the Blue Jays traded Comer as the player to be named later in the deal completed on July 20 that sent Francisco Cordero, Ben Francisco, Asher Wojciechowski, Joe Musgrove, David Rollins, and Carlos Pérez to the Houston Astros, in exchange for J. A. Happ, Brandon Lyon, and David Carpenter. Houston assigned him to the Greeneville Astros of the Rookie-level Appalachian League and he finished the season there. In 49.1 total innings pitched between Bluefield and Greeneville, he was 3–4 with a 4.56 ERA. In 2013, he pitched for the Tri-City ValleyCats of the Single–A New York-Penn League where he was 2–5 with a 4.93 ERA in 15 games (seven starts), and in 2014, he played with the Quad Cities River Bandits of the Single–A Midwest League where he compiled a 2–5 record and 4.24 ERA in 21 games (11 starts).

Comer spent the 2015 season with Quad Cities and Lancaster JetHawks of the High–A California League, transitioning into a relief pitcher during the season. In 30 games (14 being starts), he was 7–5 with a 4.46 ERA. After the 2015 season, he played winter baseball for the Adelaide Bite of the Australian Baseball League to gain more experience as a reliever. In 2016 he played for Lancaster and the Corpus Christi Hooks of the Double–A Texas League. In 29 relief appearances between both teams he was 2–2 with a 4.09 ERA. He played for the Fresno Grizzlies of the Triple–A Pacific Coast League in 2017, going 5–4 with a 3.68 ERA in 43 relief appearances. He elected free agency following the season on November 6, 2017.

=== Detroit Tigers ===
On November 16, 2017, Comer signed a minor league contract with Detroit Tigers organization. He played in 48 games for the Toledo Mud Hens of the Triple–A International League, compiling a 3.86 ERA with 57 strikeouts and 4 saves across 56 innings of work. Comer elected free agency following the season on November 2, 2018.

=== Sugar Land Skeeters ===
On January 28, 2019, Comer signed a minor league contract with the Minnesota Twins. He was released prior to the start of the season on March 27.

On April 15, 2019, Comer signed with the Sugar Land Skeeters of the Atlantic League of Professional Baseball. In 43 appearances out of the bullpen, Comer compiled a 2-5 record and 4.44 ERA with 55 strikeouts and one save across 46 2/3 innings pitched. He became a free agent following the season.
