= David Carpenter (baseball, born 1985) =

American baseball player (born 1985)

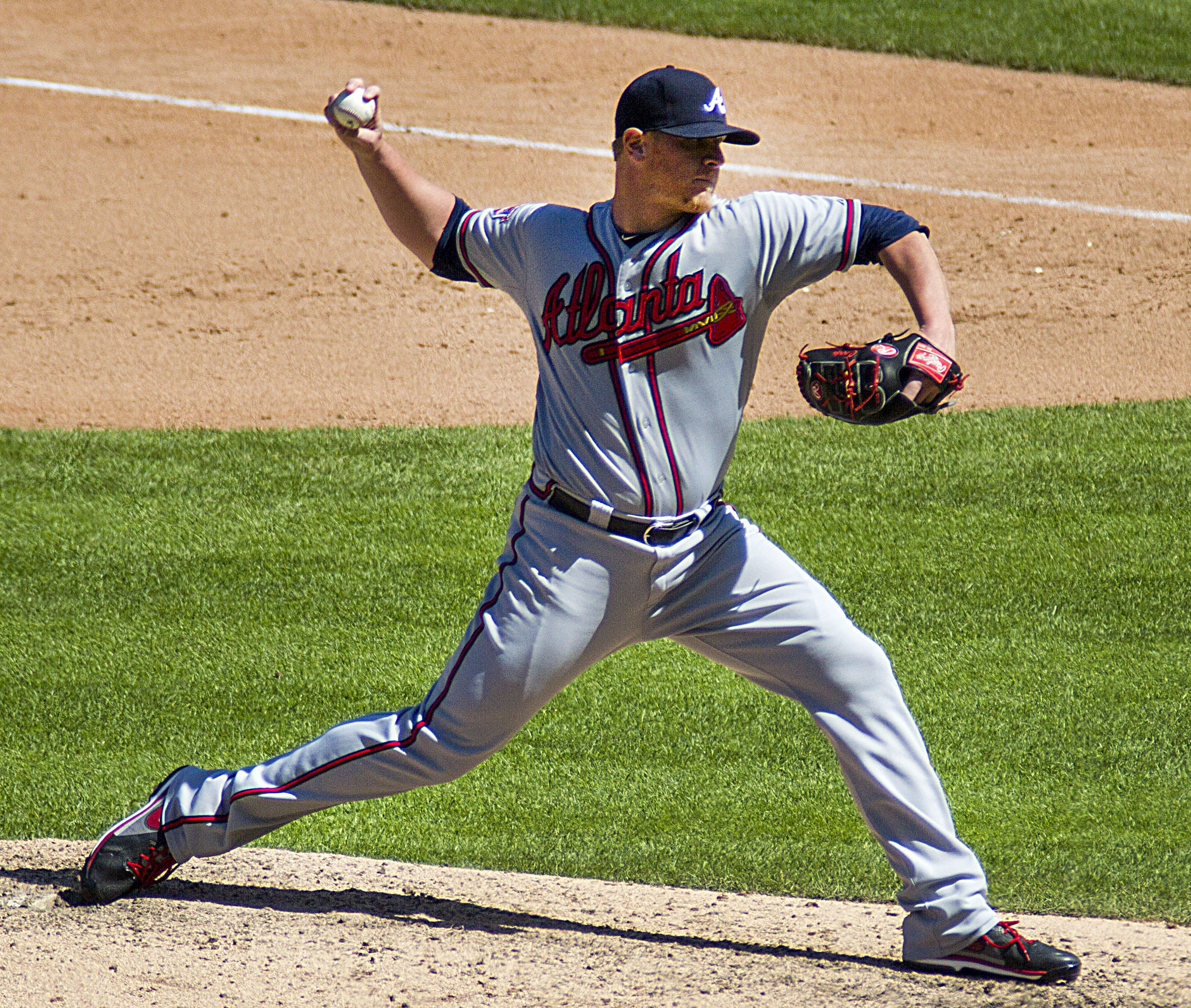
- Carpenter with the Atlanta Braves
- Pitcher
- Born: July 15, 1985 (age 41); Morgantown, West Virginia, U.S.
- Batted: Right Threw: Right

MLB debut
- June 30, 2011, for the Houston Astros

Last MLB appearance
- August 18, 2019, for the Texas Rangers

MLB statistics
- Win–loss record: 11–11
- Earned run average: 3.69
- Strikeouts: 218
- Stats at Baseball Reference

Teams
- Houston Astros (2011–2012); Toronto Blue Jays (2012); Atlanta Braves (2013–2014); New York Yankees (2015); Washington Nationals (2015); Texas Rangers (2019)

Darrell David Carpenter (born July 15, 1985) is an American former professional baseball pitcher. He played in Major League Baseball (MLB) for the Houston Astros, Toronto Blue Jays, Atlanta Braves, New York Yankees, Washington Nationals, and Texas Rangers. He is the current manager of the Jacksonville Jumbo Shrimp of the International League (IL) and the Triple-A affiliate of the Miami Marlins.

== High school and college ==
Carpenter attended East Fairmont High School in Fairmont, West Virginia and then West Virginia University (WVU), where he played college baseball for the West Virginia Mountaineers baseball team, from 2004 to 2006. While at WVU, Carpenter was a catcher. In 2004, he batted .235 in 81 at bats; in 2005, Carpenter posted a .282 average in 110 at bats; and in 2006, he hit .316 with 38 runs batted in (RBI) in 187 at bats.

== Professional career ==
=== St. Louis Cardinals ===
The St. Louis Cardinals selected Carpenter in the 12th round of the 2006 Major League Baseball draft. He played for the State College Spikes in 2006, hitting .189 in 37 games. In 2007, Carpenter batted .220 for the GCL Cardinals and Batavia Muckdogs. He both caught and pitched in 2008: catching for the Quad Cities River Bandits and Palm Beach Cardinals (hitting .215 in 65 at bats); and pitching for the GCL Cardinals and Johnson City Cardinals (posting a 1.84 earned run average (ERA) in 15 relief appearances, while striking out 17 batters in 14 2/3 innings). For the 2009 season, Carpenter converted to pitching full-time and went 5–3 with a 4.28 ERA in 52 relief appearances for the River Bandits, striking out 77 batters in 67 1/3 innings. In 2010, he began the season with the Palm Beach Cardinals.

=== Houston Astros ===
On August 19, 2010, Carpenter was traded to the Houston Astros for Pedro Feliz. Carpenter finished the season with the Lancaster JetHawks and went a combined 6–4 with a 2.51 ERA in 55 games, finishing 49 and saving 20.

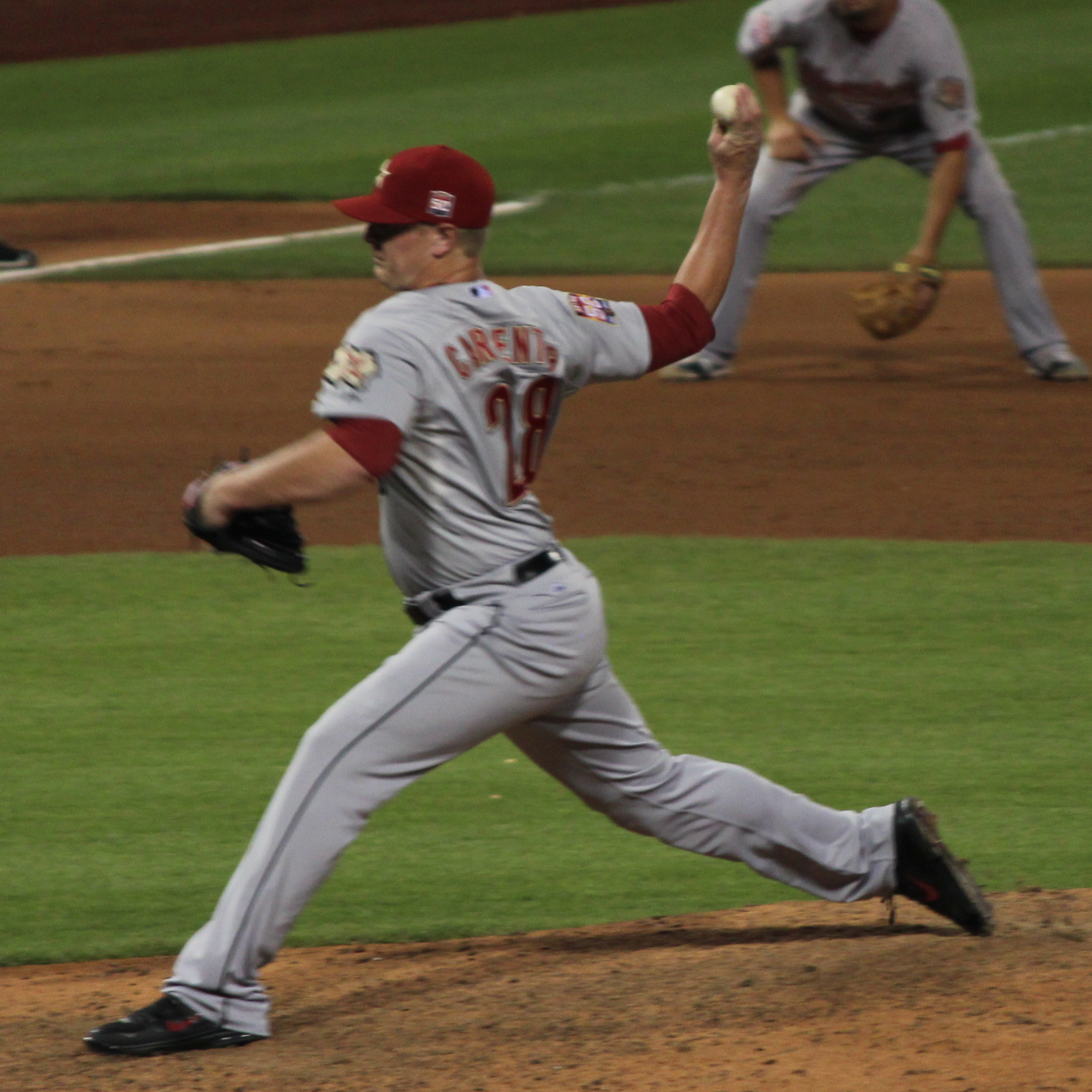
Carpenter pitching for the Houston Astros in 2012

Carpenter split the 2011 season between the major and minor leagues. In MiLB, he went a combined 0–1, with 14 saves and a 1.91 ERA in 33 games for the Corpus Christi Hooks and Oklahoma City RedHawks, while striking out 38 batters in 33 innings pitched.

Carpenter made his big league debut with the Astros, on June 30, 2011. In his rookie campaign, Carpenter posted a 1–3 win–loss record, with a 2.93 ERA, in 27 2/3 innings pitched, while posting 29 strikeouts across 34 games.

=== Toronto Blue Jays ===
Carpenter was traded to the Toronto Blue Jays on July 20, 2012, along with Brandon Lyon, and J. A. Happ, for Francisco Cordero, Ben Francisco, Asher Wojciechowski, David Rollins, Joe Musgrove, Carlos Pérez, and a player to be named later (Kevin Comer). Carpenter was assigned to the Las Vegas 51s. Carpenter was called up to the Jays on August 10 after Brett Lawrie was placed on the disabled list. On the same day, Carpenter appeared in a game, becoming the 32nd pitcher used by the Jays in the 2012 season (a club record at the time), but was optioned back to Las Vegas after the game to make room for Mike McCoy. Carpenter was recalled to the Blue Jays active roster on September 7 after the Las Vegas 51s season ended.

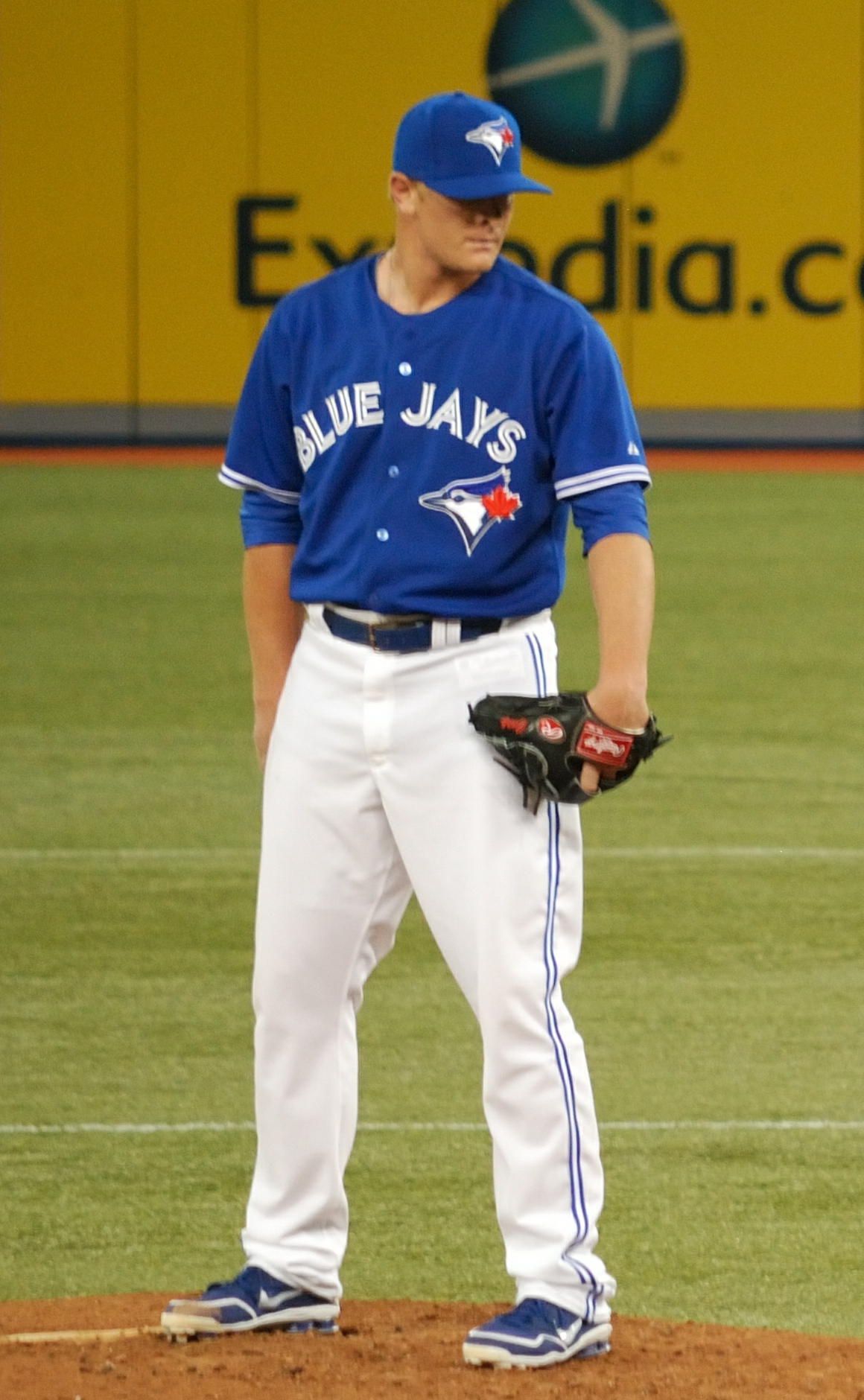
Carpenter with the Blue Jays, 2012

=== Boston Red Sox ===
On October 21, 2012, Carpenter was traded to the Red Sox for infielder Mike Avilés, after Avilés had been the agreed-upon compensation for the Red Sox signing incumbent Blue Jays manager John Farrell to fill that role for them. A player cannot in actuality be traded directly for a manager – he must be traded for another player – which explains why the Blue Jays sent Carpenter to Boston. On November 20, he was designated for assignment, along with four other players.

=== Atlanta Braves ===
The Atlanta Braves claimed Carpenter on waivers on November 30, 2012. He was optioned to the Triple-A Gwinnett Braves on March 26. He was recalled on April 20, then optioned back to Gwinnett on April 22. He was recalled again on April 30. Carpenter ended up making his Braves debut on May 10, giving up 2 runs in 2.1 innings against the Giants. Carpenter spent the rest of the year in the Braves bullpen, where in 56 appearances, he was 4–1 with a 1.78 ERA and 12 holds, striking out 74 in 65 2/3 innings. Carpenter was the losing pitcher in Game 4 of the 2013 National League Divisional Series (NLDS), during which he gave up a two-run homer to Juan Uribe that would win the game for the Los Angeles Dodgers, ending the Braves' postseason run.

Carpenter began 2014 with Atlanta as their setup man. On June 17, he was fined an undisclosed amount for throwing at Corey Dickerson, on June 12. The incident started after Dickerson hit catcher Gerald Laird twice in one at-bat, once on a foul tip and once with on the backswing of the bat. Carpenter then hit Dickerson on the hip with a fastball. He was also placed on the disabled list that day, and was replaced by Pedro Beato. In 34 appearances before the stint on the disabled list, Carpenter was 4–1 with a 4.23 ERA, 10 holds, and 35 strikeouts.

=== New York Yankees ===
The Braves traded Carpenter and Chasen Shreve to the New York Yankees for Manny Banuelos, on January 1, 2015. On June 3, Carpenter was designated for assignment by the Yankees. He appeared in 22 games for the Yankees with a 4.82 ERA.

=== Washington Nationals ===
On June 11, 2015, Carpenter was traded to the Washington Nationals in exchange for Tony Renda. He pitched in eight games for Washington, then missed the rest of the season due to right shoulder inflammation. He became a free agent after the season.

=== Atlanta Braves (second stint) ===
On November 24, 2015, Carpenter signed a minor league contract with the Atlanta Braves. He was invited to spring training, and released on March 5, 2016.

=== Tampa Bay Rays ===
On March 11, 2016, Carpenter signed a minor league deal with the Tampa Bay Rays. He was released on March 30.

=== Bridgeport Bluefish ===
On April 7, 2016, Carpenter signed with the Bridgeport Bluefish of the Atlantic League of Professional Baseball.

=== Los Angeles Angels ===
On May 13, 2016, Carpenter signed a minor league deal with the Los Angeles Angels of Anaheim. He was released on June 28, 2016.

=== Bridgeport Bluefish (second stint) ===
On June 30, 2016, Carpenter re-signed with the Bluefish for the remainder of the 2016 season. In total he appeared in 36 games 35.2 innings of relief he went 1-0 with a 3.28 ERA with 39 strikeouts and 6 saves.

=== Tampa Bay Rays (second stint) ===
Carpenter signed a minor league contract with the Tampa Bay Rays on January 30, 2017. He was released on April 4, 2017.

=== Bridgeport Bluefish (third stint) ===
On April 14, 2017, Carpenter signed with the Bridgeport Bluefish of the Atlantic League of Professional Baseball. In 39 games 37.2 innings of relief he went 1-3 with a 1.91 ERA with 45 strikeouts and 30 saves.

=== Arizona Diamondbacks ===
On July 21, 2017, Carpenter signed a minor league deal with the Arizona Diamondbacks. He became a free agent after the season.

=== Texas Rangers ===
On February 5, 2019, Carpenter signed a minor-league contract with the Texas Rangers. He was assigned to the Nashville Sounds, on April 12. On May 31, Carpenter's contract was selected by the big league team and he was added to the major league roster. On June 8, Carpenter was designated for assignment. He cleared waivers and was outrighted to Nashville, on June 10. On August 13, the Rangers selected Carpenter's contract. On August 19, he was again designated for assignment. On August 21, Carpenter was outrighted to Nashville. He elected free agency after the season.

=== Cincinnati Reds ===
On December 16, 2019, Carpenter signed a minor league deal with the Cincinnati Reds. Carpenter did not play in a game in 2020 due to the cancellation of the minor league season because of the COVID-19 pandemic. He was released on September 16, 2020.

On April 9, 2021, Carpenter, a free agent at the time, was suspended by Minor League Baseball for one year for a violation of its Joint Drug Prevention and Treatment Program.

== Coaching career ==
On February 7, 2023, Carpenter was named the manager of the West Virginia Black Bears of the MLB Draft League.

On February 11, 2025, the Miami Marlins hired Carpenter to serve as the manager for their Triple-A affiliate, the Jacksonville Jumbo Shrimp.
