= Shamong Township, New Jersey =

Township in Burlington County, New Jersey, US

- Township
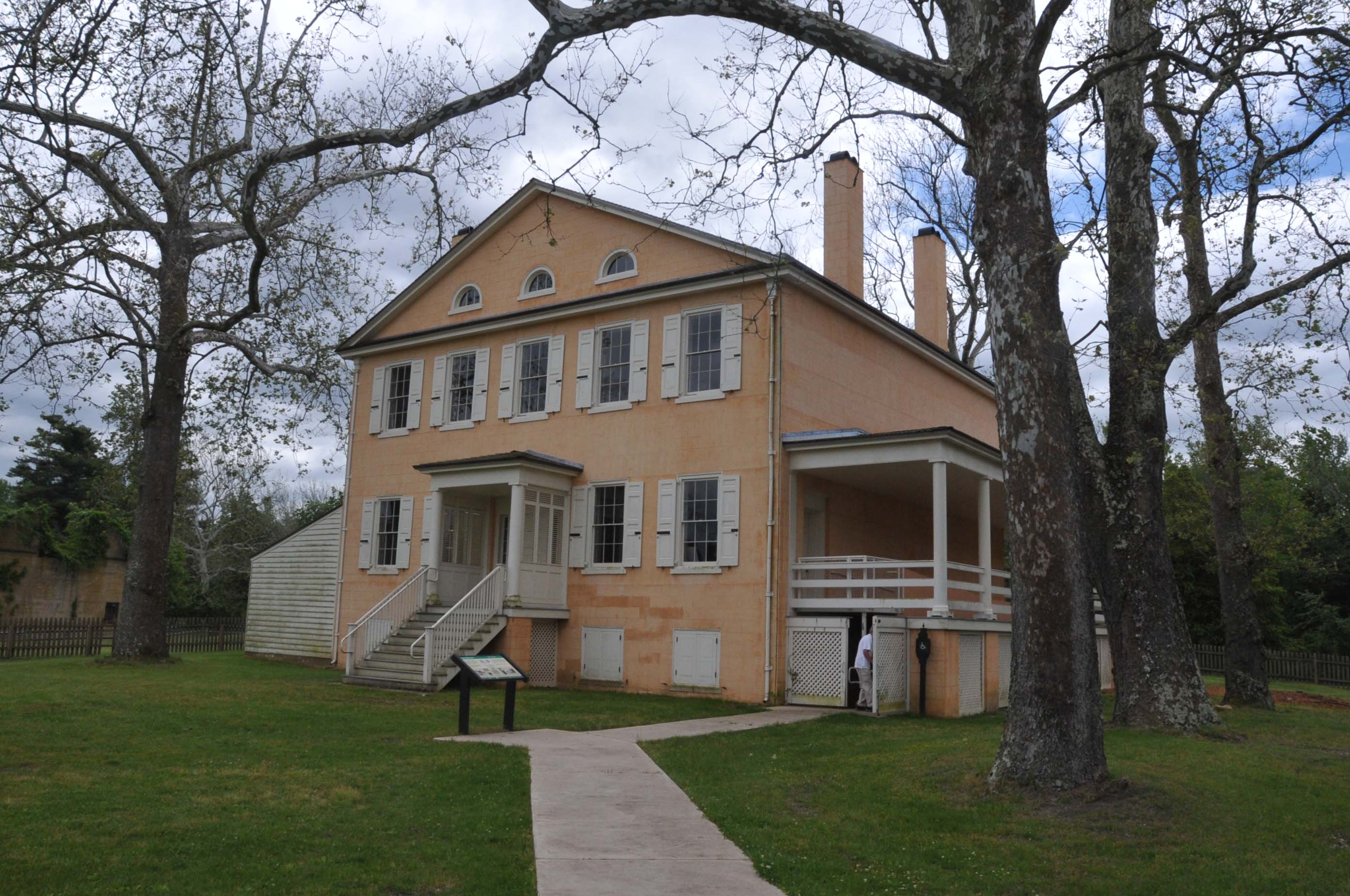
- Samuel Richards Mansion in Atsion, a settlement within Shamong Township

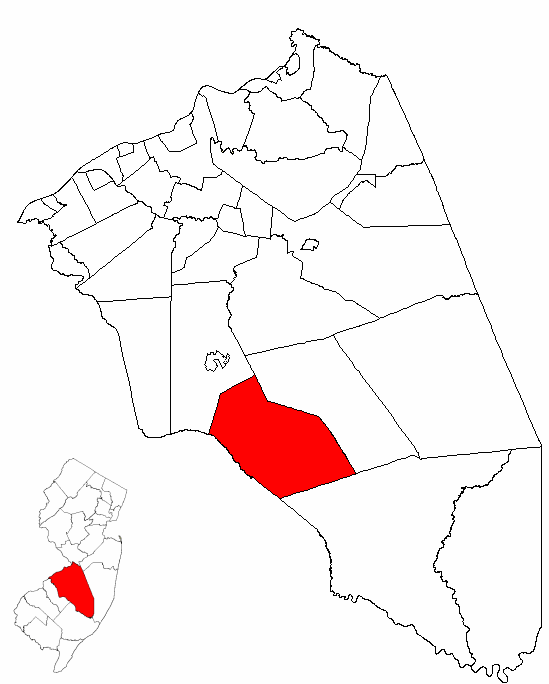
- Shamong Township highlighted in Burlington County. Inset map: Burlington County highlighted in the State of New Jersey.

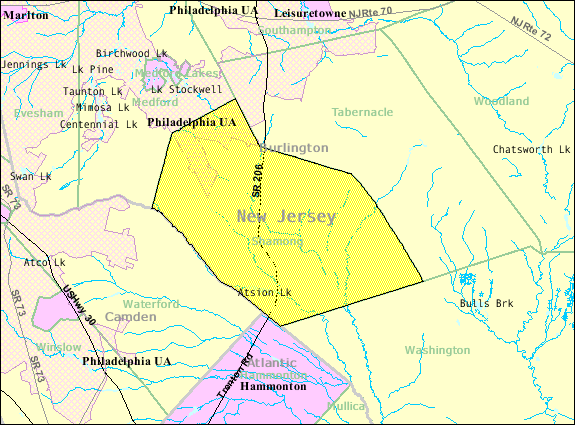
- Census Bureau map of Shamong Township, New Jersey

- Location in Burlington County Location in New Jersey Location in the United States
- Coordinates: 39.78500°N 74.71718°W
- Country: United States
- State: New Jersey
- County: Burlington
- Incorporated: February 19, 1852

Government
  - Type: Township
  - Body: Township Committee
  - Mayor: Michael Di Croce (R, term ends December 31, 2026)
  - Administrator / Clerk: Lisa Jordan

Area
  - Total: 45.01 sq mi (116.58 km^{2})
  - Land: 44.46 sq mi (115.14 km^{2})
  - Water: 0.56 sq mi (1.44 km^{2}) 1.24%
  - Rank: 41st of 565 in state 6th of 40 in county
- Elevation: 56 ft (17 m)

Population (2020)
  - Total: 6,460
  - Estimate (2023): 6,503
  - Rank: 329th of 565 in state 25th of 40 in county
  - Density: 145.3/sq mi (56.1/km^{2})
  - Rank: 523rd of 565 in state 35th of 40 in county
- Time zone: UTC−05:00 (Eastern (EST))
  - Summer (DST): UTC−04:00 (Eastern (EDT))
- ZIP Code: 08088
- Area code: 609 exchanges: 268, 801, 859
- FIPS code: 3400566810
- GNIS feature ID: 0882084
- Website: www.shamong.net

Shamong Township (pronounced "Shuh-Mong") is a township in Burlington County, in the U.S. state of New Jersey. As of the 2020 United States census, the township's population was 6,460, a decrease of 30 (−0.5%) from the 2010 census count of 6,490, which in turn reflected an increase of 28 (+0.4%) from the 6,462 counted in the 2000 census. The township, and all of Burlington County, is a part of the Philadelphia metropolitan area.

Shamong was incorporated as a township by an act of the New Jersey Legislature on February 19, 1852, from portions of Medford, Southampton and Washington townships. Portions of the township were taken to form Woodland Township (March 7, 1866) and Tabernacle Township (March 22, 1901). In April 1902, portions of Hammonton and Waterford Township were annexed to the township. The township's name comes from Native American terms meaning "place of the big horn", from the words oschummo ("horn") and onk ("place").

New Jersey Monthly magazine ranked Shamong Township as its 6th best place to live in its 2008 rankings of the "Best Places To Live" in New Jersey.

== History ==
This area, along with much of present-day southern New Jersey, was inhabited by Lenape Native Americans at the time of European encounter. They spoke Unami, one of the three major dialects of the Lenape language, which belonged to the Algonquian language family. The Lenape territory ranged from the New York metropolitan area and western Long Island, extending into New Jersey, eastern Pennsylvania along the Delaware River, and Delaware.

By the mid-18th century, English colonists had displaced the local Lenape of southern New Jersey onto what was previously known as the Brotherton Indian Reservation. This reservation was in the area of present-day Indian Mills, which was named after mills built and operated by the Brotherton people, who were converted Christian Indians. Some of them were relocated in 1765 from Cranbury, New Jersey. With sustained pressure following the American Revolutionary War, the Brotherton Indians of New Jersey migrated to New York. They accepted an offer by the Stockbridge–Munsee Community, also Christian converts, to settle on their reservation in the central part of the state, where they had been allocated land by the Oneida people, one of the Iroquois nations. Some of the Munsee-speaking Lenape from the northern part of their territory also migrated there. These remaining communities were attempting to reorganize after years of disease and conflict with colonists and major powers. The Brotherton Indians sold their last property in New Jersey in 1818 and had essentially been absorbed by the Munsee.

Following the Revolutionary War, settlers from New England flooded into New York, encroaching on Indian territory. Ultimately, the Stockbridge and Munsee were relocated to Wisconsin in the 1820s and 1830s, forced out along with the Oneida by the United States Indian Removal policy, which sought to relocate Native Americans to the west of the Mississippi River. Today, the Stockbridge–Munsee Community is a federally recognized tribe, with a 22,000-acre (8,900 ha) reservation in Shawano County, Wisconsin.

In 1992, a non-binding referendum gave voters the opportunity to consider renaming the township to Indian Mills, the name of an unincorporated community within the township.

== Geography ==
According to the U.S. Census Bureau, the township had a total area of 45.01 square miles (116.58 km^{2}), including 44.45 square miles (115.14 km^{2}) of land and 0.56 square miles (1.44 km^{2}) of water (1.24%). Unincorporated communities, localities and place names located partially or completely within the township include Atsion, Dellette, Flyat, Hampton Furnace, High Crossing, Indian Mills, and Smalls.

The township borders Medford Township, Tabernacle Township, and Washington Township in Burlington County; Hammonton in Atlantic County; and Waterford Township in Camden County.

The township is one of 56 South Jersey municipalities that are included within the New Jersey Pinelands National Reserve, a protected natural area of unique ecology covering 1,100,000 acres (450,000 ha), that has been classified as a United States Biosphere Reserve and established by Congress in 1978 as the nation's first National Reserve. All of the township is included in the state-designated Pinelands Area, which includes portions of Burlington County, along with areas in Atlantic, Camden, Cape May, Cumberland, Gloucester and Ocean counties.

== Demographics ==
Historical population
Census	Pop.	Note	%±
1860	1,008		—
1870	1,149	*	14.0%
1880	1,097		−4.5%
1890	958		−12.7%
1900	910		−5.0%
1910	483	*	−46.9%
1920	414		−14.3%
1930	475		14.7%
1940	505		6.3%
1950	712		41.0%
1960	774		8.7%
1970	1,318		70.3%
1980	4,537		244.2%
1990	5,765		27.1%
2000	6,462		12.1%
2010	6,490		0.4%
2020	6,460		−0.5%
2023 (est.)	6,503		0.7%
Population sources: 1860–2000 1860–1920; 1860–1870 1870 1880–1890; 1890–1910 1910–1930; 1940–2000 2000; 2010 2020 * = Lost territory in previous decade.

=== 2010 census ===
The 2010 United States census counted 6,490 people, 2,168 households, and 1,825 families in the township. The population density was 146.2 per square mile (56.4/km^{2}). There were 2,227 housing units at an average density of 50.2 per square mile (19.4/km^{2}). The racial makeup was 96.86% (6,286) White, 0.92% (60) Black or African American, 0.20% (13) Native American, 0.59% (38) Asian, 0.02% (1) Pacific Islander, 0.26% (17) from other races, and 1.16% (75) from two or more races. Hispanic or Latino of any race were 2.30% (149) of the population.

Of the 2,168 households, 40.2% had children under the age of 18; 71.7% were married couples living together; 8.6% had a female householder with no husband present and 15.8% were non-families. Of all households, 12.7% were made up of individuals and 4.4% had someone living alone who was 65 years of age or older. The average household size was 2.99 and the average family size was 3.28.

26.8% of the population were under the age of 18, 7.3% from 18 to 24, 21.7% from 25 to 44, 34.3% from 45 to 64, and 9.8% who were 65 years of age or older. The median age was 41.9 years. For every 100 females, the population had 97.4 males. For every 100 females ages 18 and older there were 98.3 males.

The Census Bureau's 2006–2010 American Community Survey showed that (in 2010 inflation-adjusted dollars) median household income was $104,063 (with a margin of error of +/− $7,752) and the median family income was $110,848 (+/− $10,655). Males had a median income of $80,188 (+/− $22,205) versus $53,591 (+/− $14,752) for females. The per capita income for the borough was $38,817 (+/− $3,645). About 2.4% of families and 3.8% of the population were below the poverty line, including 1.6% of those under age 18 and 9.4% of those age 65 or over.

=== 2000 census ===
As of the 2000 U.S. census, there were 6,462 people, 2,132 households, and 1,820 families residing in the township. The population density was 144.2 inhabitants per square mile (55.7/km^{2}). There were 2,175 housing units at an average density of 48.5 per square mile (18.7/km^{2}). The racial makeup of the township was 97.25% White, 0.82% African American, 0.11% Native American, 0.67% Asian, 0.31% from other races, and 0.85% from two or more races. Hispanic or Latino of any race were 1.05% of the population.

There were 2,132 households, out of which 44.9% had children under the age of 18 living with them, 76.2% were married couples living together, 6.0% had a female householder with no husband present, and 14.6% were non-families. 11.4% of all households were made up of individuals, and 3.8% had someone living alone who was 65 years of age or older. The average household size was 3.03 and the average family size was 3.29.

In the township, the population was spread out, with 29.4% under the age of 18, 6.5% from 18 to 24, 28.9% from 25 to 44, 29.2% from 45 to 64, and 6.0% who were 65 years of age or older. The median age was 37 years. For every 100 females, there were 100.5 males. For every 100 females age 18 and over, there were 99.8 males.

The median income for a household in the township was $77,457, and the median income for a family was $82,534. Males had a median income of $55,664 versus $35,440 for females. The per capita income for the township was $30,934. About 2.3% of families and 2.6% of the population were below the poverty line, including 3.7% of those under age 18 and 2.1% of those age 65 or over.

== Government ==
=== Local government ===
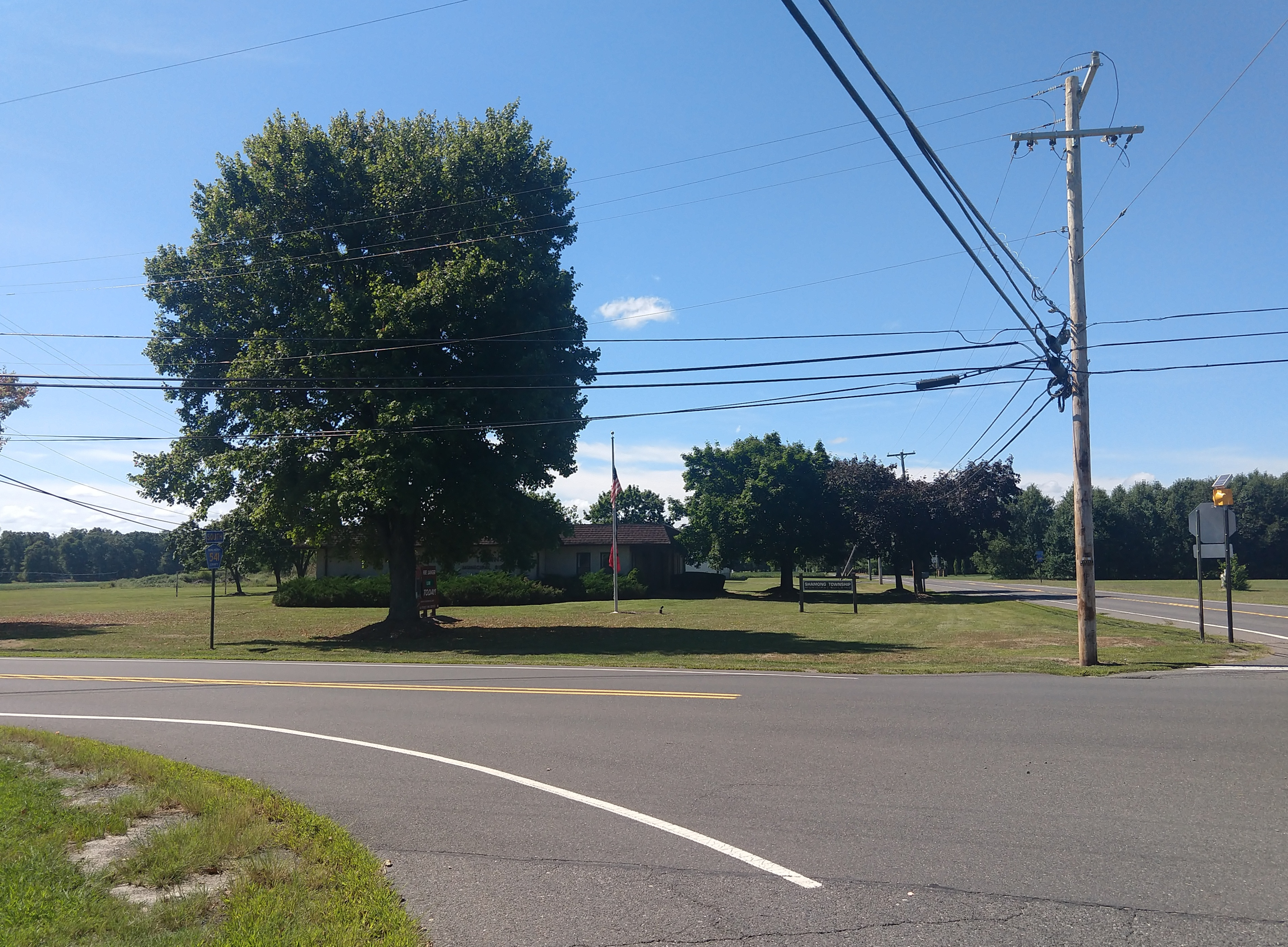
Shamong Township municipal building

Shamong Township is governed under the Township form of New Jersey municipal government, one of 141 municipalities (of the 564) statewide that use this form, the second-most commonly used form of government in the state. The Township Committee is comprised of five members, who are elected directly by the voters at-large in partisan elections to serve three-year terms of office on a staggered basis, with either one or two seats coming up for election each year as part of the November general election in a three-year cycle. At an annual reorganization meeting held each January, the Township Committee selects one of its members to serve as Mayor and another as Deputy Mayor.

As of 2023, members of the Shamong Township Committee are Mayor Michael S. DiCroce (R, term on committee ends December 31, 2025; term as mayor ends 2023), Deputy Mayor Martin D. Mozitis (R, term on committee and as deputy mayor ends 2023), Neil R. Wilkinson (R, 2025), Brian Woods (2024) and Chris Zehnder (2024).

Township Committee member Chris Norman left office in January 2012, citing potential conflicts of interest in his employment with a law firm that does business with the township and was replaced by Tim Gimbel on an interim basis before Gimbel won election in November 2012 to serve the balance of Norman's term ending December 2013.

==== Emergency services ====
Law enforcement in the township is provided from the New Jersey State Police barracks in Southampton Township.

Fire Coverage is provided by Indian Mills Volunteer Fire Company located at 48 Willow Grove Road.

=== Federal, state, and county representation ===
Shamong Township is located in the 3rd Congressional District and is part of New Jersey's 8th state legislative district. Prior to the 2010 Census, Shamong Township had been split between the 2nd Congressional District and the 3rd Congressional District, a change made by the New Jersey Redistricting Commission that took effect in January 2013, based on the results of the November 2012 general elections.

For the 119th United States Congress, New Jersey's 3rd congressional district is currently represented Herb Conaway (D, Delran Township). New Jersey is represented in the United States Senate by Democrats Cory Booker (Newark, term ends 2027) and Andy Kim (Moorestown, term ends 2031).

For the 2026–2027 session, the 8th legislative district of the New Jersey Legislature is represented in the New Jersey Senate by Latham Tiver (R, Southampton Township) and in the General Assembly by Anthony Angelozzi (D, Hammonton) and Andrea Katz (D, Chesterfield Township).

Burlington County is governed by a Board of County Commissioners comprised of five members who are chosen at-large in partisan elections to serve three-year terms of office on a staggered basis, with either one or two seats coming up for election each year; at an annual reorganization meeting, the board selects a director and deputy director from among its members to serve a one-year term. As of 2026, Burlington County's Commissioners are: Director Felicia Hopson (D, Willingboro Township, term as commissioner ends December 31, 2027; term as director ends 2026), Deputy Director Allison Eckel (D, Medford, term as commissioner ends 2028; term as deputy director ends 2026), Randy Brolo (D, Lumberton, 2026; elected to an unexpired term), Tyler Burrell (D, Delran Township, 2027) and Tom Pullion (D, Edgewater Park, 2026).

Burlington County's constitutional officers are Clerk Joanne Schwartz (D, Southampton Township, 2028), Sheriff James H. Kostoplis (D, Bordentown, 2028) and Surrogate Brian J. Carlin (D, Burlington Township, 2026).

=== Politics ===
United States presidential election results for Shamong Township 2024 2020 2016 2012 2008 2004
Year	Republican		Democratic		Third party(ies)	
Year	No.	%	No.	%	No.	%
2024	2,393	61.31%	1,470	37.66%	40	1.02%
2020	2,541	59.87%	1,645	38.76%	58	1.37%
2016	2,125	60.25%	1,245	35.30%	157	4.45%
2012	2,084	60.02%	1,348	38.82%	40	1.15%
2008	2,073	57.15%	1,510	41.63%	44	1.21%
2004	2,188	62.59%	1,286	36.78%	22	0.63%

As of March 2011, there were a total of 4,549 registered voters in Shamong Township, of which 830 (18.2% vs. 33.3% countywide) were registered as Democrats, 1,584 (34.8% vs. 23.9%) were registered as Republicans and 2,132 (46.9% vs. 42.8%) were registered as Unaffiliated. There were 3 voters registered as Libertarians or Greens. Among the township's 2010 Census population, 70.1% (vs. 61.7% in Burlington County) were registered to vote, including 95.8% of those ages 18 and over (vs. 80.3% countywide).

Gubernatorial election results for Shamong Township
Year	Republican		Democratic		Third party(ies)	
Year	No.	%	No.	%	No.	%
2025	2,040	61.48%	1,267	38.19%	11	0.33%
2021	1,898	68.47%	862	31.10%	12	0.43%
2017	1,216	61.82%	718	36.50%	33	1.68%
2013	1,474	77.29%	409	21.45%	24	1.26%
2009	1,586	66.89%	634	26.74%	151	6.37%
2005	1,232	63.54%	622	32.08%	85	4.38%

In the 2012 presidential election, Republican Mitt Romney received 2,084 votes here (59.9% vs. 40.2% countywide), ahead of Democrat Barack Obama with 1,348 votes (38.7% vs. 58.1%) and other candidates with 40 votes (1.1% vs. 1.0%), among the 3,480 ballots cast by the township's 4,710 registered voters, for a turnout of 73.9% (vs. 74.5% in Burlington County). In the 2008 presidential election, Republican John McCain received 2,073 votes here (56.8% vs. 39.9% countywide), ahead of Democrat Barack Obama with 1,510 votes (41.4% vs. 58.4%) and other candidates with 44 votes (1.2% vs. 1.0%), among the 3,648 ballots cast by the township's 4,564 registered voters, for a turnout of 79.9% (vs. 80.0% in Burlington County). In the 2004 presidential election, Republican George W. Bush received 2,188 votes here (62.4% vs. 46.0% countywide), ahead of Democrat John Kerry with 1,286 votes (36.7% vs. 52.9%) and other candidates with 22 votes (0.6% vs. 0.8%), among the 3,507 ballots cast by the township's 4,452 registered voters, for a turnout of 78.8% (vs. 78.8% in the whole county).

In the 2013 gubernatorial election, Republican Chris Christie received 1,474 votes here (76.1% vs. 61.4% countywide), ahead of Democrat Barbara Buono with 409 votes (21.1% vs. 35.8%) and other candidates with 24 votes (1.2% vs. 1.2%), among the 1,937 ballots cast by the township's 4,679 registered voters, yielding a 41.4% turnout (vs. 44.5% in the county). In the 2009 gubernatorial election, Republican Chris Christie received 1,586 votes here (66.2% vs. 47.7% countywide), ahead of Democrat Jon Corzine with 634 votes (26.5% vs. 44.5%), Independent Chris Daggett with 128 votes (5.3% vs. 4.8%) and other candidates with 23 votes (1.0% vs. 1.2%), among the 2,394 ballots cast by the township's 4,542 registered voters, yielding a 52.7% turnout (vs. 44.9% in the county).

United States Senate election results for Shamong Township1
Year	Republican		Democratic		Third party(ies)	
Year	No.	%	No.	%	No.	%
2024	2,257	59.35%	1,505	39.57%	41	1.08%
2018	1,869	63.79%	944	32.22%	117	3.99%
2012	1,951	59.32%	1,314	39.95%	24	0.73%
2006	1,321	61.64%	790	36.86%	32	1.49%

United States Senate election results for Shamong Township2
Year	Republican		Democratic		Third party(ies)	
Year	No.	%	No.	%	No.	%
2020	2,535	61.11%	1,566	37.75%	47	1.13%
2014	1,170	67.13%	554	31.78%	19	1.09%
2013	787	67.67%	365	31.38%	11	0.95%
2008	2,041	61.42%	1,226	36.89%	56	1.69%

== Education ==
The Shamong Township School District serves public school students in kindergarten through eighth grade. As of the 2023–24 school year, the district, comprised of two schools, had an enrollment of 669 students and 63.0 classroom teachers (on an FTE basis), for a student–teacher ratio of 10.6:1. Schools in the district (with 2023–24 enrollment data from the National Center for Education Statistics) are Indian Mills Elementary School with 351 students in grades PreK–4 and Indian Mills Memorial Middle School with 312 students in grades 5–8.

Public school students in Shamong Township in ninth through twelfth grades attend Seneca High School located in Tabernacle Township, which also serves students from Southampton Township, Tabernacle Township and Woodland Township. The school is part of the Lenape Regional High School District, which also serves students from Evesham Township, Medford Lakes, Medford and Mount Laurel. As of the 2023–24 school year, the high school had an enrollment of 1,037 students and 101.0 classroom teachers (on an FTE basis), for a student–teacher ratio of 10.3:1.

Students from Shamong Township, and from all of Burlington County, are eligible to attend the Burlington County Institute of Technology, a countywide public school district that serves the vocational and technical education needs of students at the high school and post-secondary level at its campuses in Medford and Westampton.

== Transportation ==
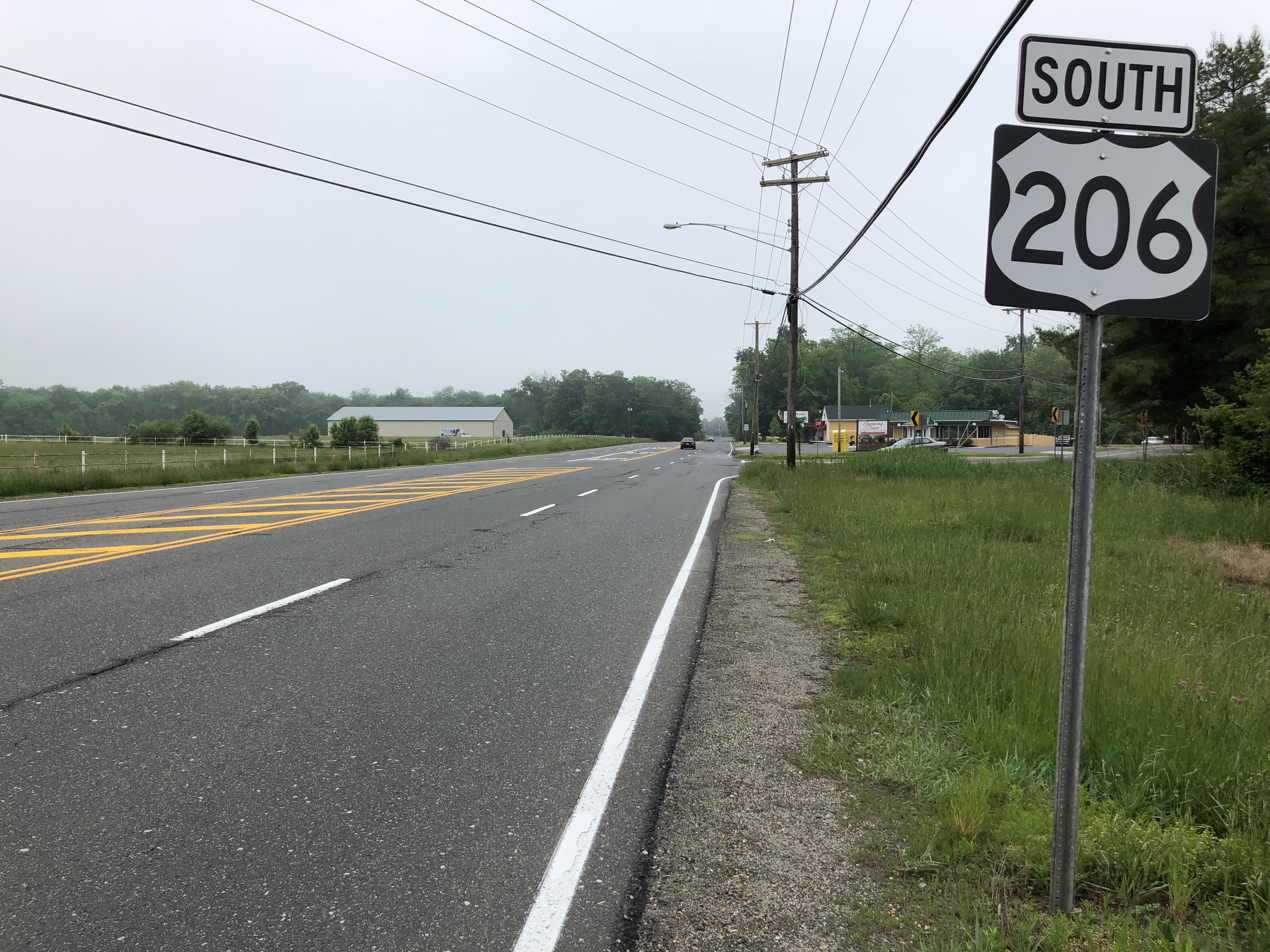
U.S. Route 206 in Shamong Township

As of May 2010, the township had a total of 76.92 miles (123.79 km) of roadways, of which 53.03 miles (85.34 km) were maintained by the municipality, 17.42 miles (28.03 km) by Burlington County and 6.47 miles (10.41 km) by the New Jersey Department of Transportation.

U.S. Route 206 is the most significant highway passing through Shamong Township. County Route 534 and County Route 541 also serve the township.

== Wineries ==
- Valenzano Winery

== Notable people ==
People who were born in, residents of, or otherwise closely associated with Shamong Township include:

- Daria Berenato (born 1993), retired professional wrestler, best known for her time in WWE under the ring name Sonya Deville; now appears in Total Nonstop Action Wrestling as an on-screen authority figure
- Kacey Carrig (born 1992), model
- Kevin Comer (born 1992), professional baseball pitcher for the Detroit Tigers organization
- John J. Gardner (1845–1921), mayor of Atlantic City, New Jersey who represented New Jersey's 2nd congressional district from 1893 to 1913
- Keith Jones (born 1968), former forward for the Philadelphia Flyers
- Samuel Richards (1769–1842), owner of the Atsion Iron Works and Atsion Mansion
- Juliet Richardson (born 1980), singer, known as Juliet, best known for her 2005 album Random Order and hit single "Avalon"
- Charity Still (c. 1775–1857), abolitionist who was considered the matriarch of the American abolition movement
- William Still (1821–1902), abolitionist who was known as "the father of the Underground Railroad"
- Joe Vento (1939–2011), owner of South Philadelphia cheesesteak shop Geno's Steaks
