= Caruso (surname) =

Caruso is an Italian surname derived from carusu, the Sicilian word for 'boy'. In 19th-century Sicily, the Carusi were young mine workers.

Notable people with the surname include:

== Acting, directing, producing ==
- Anthony Caruso (actor) (1916–2003), American character actor
- D.J. Caruso (born 1965), American film director
- David Caruso (born 1956), American actor and producer
- Eugenia Caruso (born 1984), English actress and screenwriter
- Fred C. Caruso, American film producer
- Marcos Caruso (born 1952), Brazilian actor and author of soap operas
- Pino Caruso (1934–2019), Italian actor, author and TV personality
- Renai Caruso (born 1981), Serbian actress living in Australia
- Robert Caruso, American director of commercials, video, and film
- Sophia Anne Caruso (born 2001), American actress

== Business ==
- Anthony Caruso (entrepreneur), American business executive
- Dan Caruso (born 1963), American business executive
- Gigi Caruso (born 2000), American businessperson and hearing loss advocate
- Henry Caruso (1922–2017), American businessman, founder of Dollar Rent A Car
- Rick Caruso (born 1959), American real estate billionaire
- Richard Caruso, American businessman, founder of Integra Life Sciences

== Crime ==
- Frank T. Caruso (1911–1983), Chicago mobster
- Giuseppe Caruso (brigand) (1820–1892), Italian brigand
- Paul Caruso (lawyer) (1920–2001), American criminal defense attorney from California
- Pietro Caruso (1899–1944), Italian fascist involved in the Fosse Ardeatine mass murder

== Musical arts ==
- Enrico Caruso (1873–1921), Italian opera singer
- Justin Caruso, American DJ and record producer
- Luciano Caruso (composer) (born 1957), Italian jazz composer and soprano saxophonist
- Michael Caruso (musician) (born 1954), American singer-songwriter
- Paul Caruso (drummer) (1955–2006), American drummer, The Atlantics
- Pippo Caruso (1935–2018), Italian composer, conductor and music arranger

== Sports ==
=== Basketball ===
- Alex Caruso (born 1994), American basketball player
- Henry Caruso (basketball) (born 1995), American-Italian basketball player

=== Cycling ===
- Damiano Caruso (born 1987), Italian road bicycle racer
- Giampaolo Caruso (born 1980), Italian road bicycle racer
- Roberto Caruso (born 1967), Italian road bicycle racer

=== Football (gridiron) ===
- Glenn Caruso (born 1974), American football coach and former player

=== Football (soccer) ===
- Ciro Caruso (born 1973), Italian footballer
- Francesco Caruso (born 1982), American soccer player
- Leandro Caruso (born 1982), Argentine footballer
- Ricardo Caruso Lombardi (born 1962), Argentine football manager
- Simone Caruso (born 1994), Italian footballer

=== Ice hockey ===
- Dave Caruso (born 1982), American ice hockey player
- Michael Caruso (ice hockey) (born 1988), Canadian ice hockey player

=== Other ===
- Emily Caruso (born 1977), American sport shooter
- Michael Caruso (racing driver) (born 1983), Australian racing driver
- Mike Caruso (baseball) (born 1977), American baseball player
- Oliver Caruso (born 1974), German weightlifter
- Pat Caruso (born 1963), Italian field hockey player
- Salvatore Caruso (born 1992), Italian tennis player
- Stefano Caruso (born 1987), German-Italian ice dancer

== Writing and journalism ==
- Charly Caruso (born 1987), American sports journalist
- Dee Caruso (1928–2012) American writer for TV and film
- Denise Caruso (born 1956), American journalist and analyst
- Domenico Caruso (born 1933), Italian poet and writer
- Luciano Caruso (1944–2002), Italian poet, visual artist, critic, journalist and writer
- Michael Caruso (editor), editor-in-chief of the Smithsonian magazine and coined the term "elevator pitch"

== Other ==
- Anthony Caruso (disambiguation), several people
- Bruno Caruso (1927–2018), Italian artist, graphic designer and writer
- Dorothy Caruso (1893–1955), American socialite, wife of Enrico
- Elizabeth Caruso, American politician
- Frank Caruso (chemical engineer) (born 1968), Australian engineer
- Girolamo Caruso (1842–1923), Italian agronomist and university teacher
- Jennifer Caruso, Australian historian
- Maria Caruso (born 1980), American dancer and choreographer
- Michelle Caruso-Cabrera (born 1967), American business news reporter
- Mike Caruso (politician) (born 1958), American politician
- Silvio Caruso (born 1983, created 2015, died 2018) character from Hitman (2016)

== See also ==
- Charles Anthony (tenor) (1929–2012), American actor and tenor, born Calogero Antonio Caruso
- Gershon Sirota (1874–1943), called the "Jewish Caruso", leading cantor of Europe, died in the Warsaw Ghetto
- Carusi (disambiguation)
- Carosone
- Carusone
- Crusoe (disambiguation)
