= Cruso =

Cruso may refer to:

== People ==
- John Cruso (1592/3–after 1650), English military writer and Roundhead during the English Civil War
- Timothy Cruso (1657–1697), English Presbyterian minister and writer, and the namesake of Robinson Crusoe
- Thalassa Cruso (1909–1997), British-born presenter and author on horticulture

== Places ==
- Cruso, North Carolina

== See also ==
- Crusoe (disambiguation)
- Robinson Crusoe (disambiguation)
