= Caruso =

Caruso commonly refers to the great tenor Enrico Caruso, but may refer to:

- Caruso (surname), include a list of people with the name
- Caruso (company), US real estate company
- Caruso (fashion brand), Italian luxury menswear manufacturer
- "Caruso" (song), a song written by Lucio Dalla
- Caruso, Alberta, a community in Canada
- Caruso Affiliated, a real estate development company in Los Angeles, California
- Caruso Sauce, a Uruguayan recipe for a warm sauce made of cream, ham, cheese, nuts and mushrooms
- Caruso Middle School, a middle school in Illinois
- †Caruso brachysomus, an extinct species of anglerfish

== See also ==
- Crusoe (disambiguation)
