= Carosone =

Carosone is an Italian surname chiefly from Campania and Abruzzo, derived from 'boy' and Latin gens Carus. Notable people with the surname include:

- Emily Carosone (born 1993), Italian-American softball player and coach
- Paolo Carosone (1941–2025), Italian painter, sculptor, etcher, and multimedia artist
- Renato Carosone (1920–2001), Italian musician

== See also ==
- Caruso (surname)
- Carusone
