= MMFA =

MMFA can stand for:

- The Montreal Museum of Fine Arts
- Media Matters for America, a media-watchdog organization
