= Luciano Caruso =

Luciano Caruso may refer to:

- Luciano Caruso (composer) (born 1957), Italian jazz composer and saxophonist
- Luciano Caruso (poet) (born 1944), poet, visual artist, critic, journalist and writer
