= Ford Thunderbird =

Luxury car model by Ford (1955–2005)

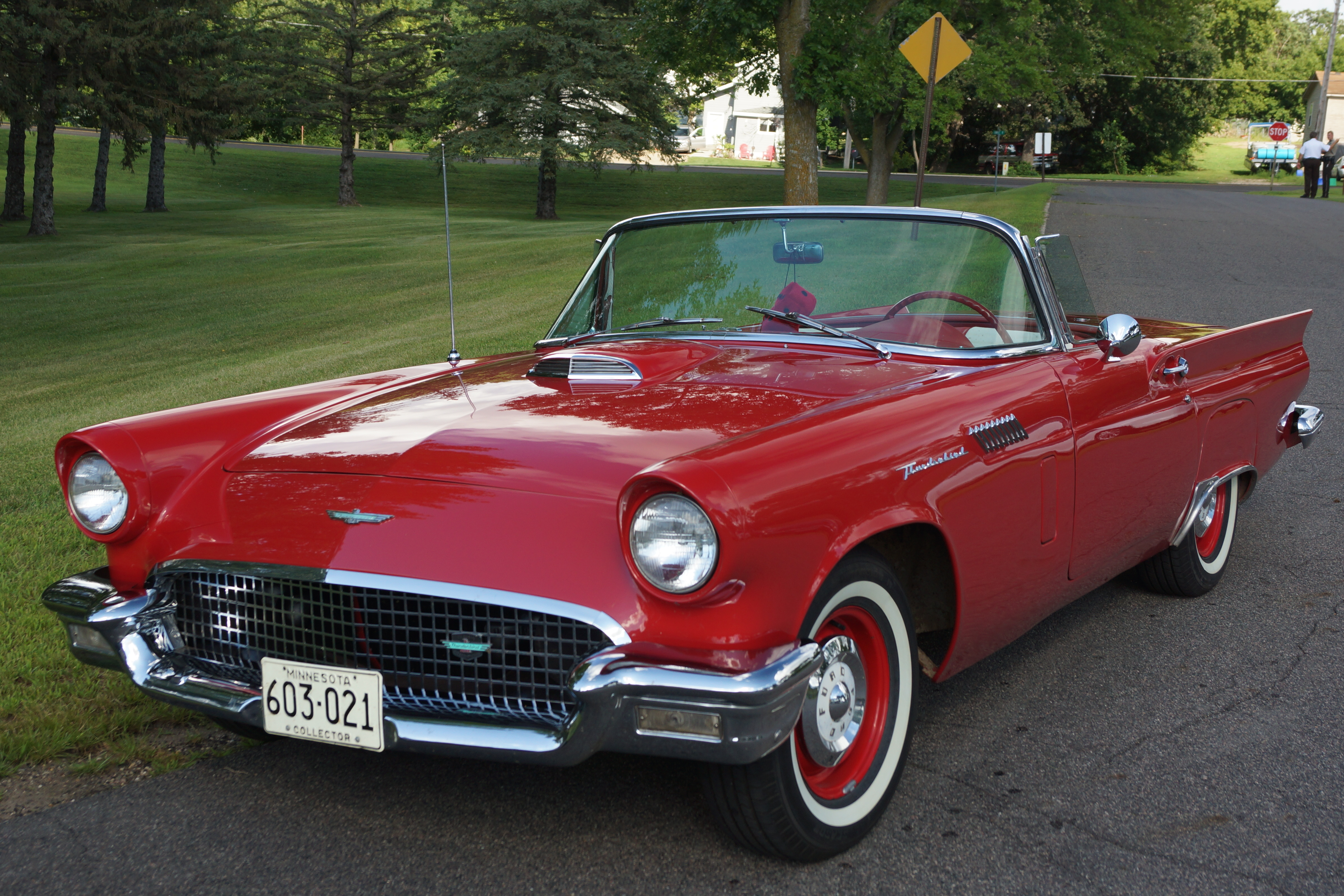
- 1957 Thunderbird

Overview
- Manufacturer: Ford Motor Company
- Production: October 1954 – September 1997; June 2001 – July 2005
- Model years: 1955–1997; 2002–2005

Body and chassis
- Class: Personal luxury car; Sports car (first generation)
- Layout: Front-engine, rear-wheel drive

The Ford Thunderbird is a personal luxury car manufactured and marketed by Ford Motor Company for model years 1955 to 2005, with a hiatus from 1998 to 2001.

Ultimately gaining a broadly used colloquial nickname, the T-Bird, the model was introduced as a two-seat convertible, subsequently offered variously in a host of body styles including as a four-seat hardtop coupe, four-seat convertible, five-seat convertible and hardtop, four-door pillared hardtop sedan, six-passenger hardtop coupe, and five-passenger pillared coupe, before returning in its final generation, again as a two-seat convertible.

At its inception, Ford targeted the two-seat Thunderbird as an upscale model. The 1958 model year design introduced a rear seat and arguably marked the expansion of a market segment that came to be known as personal luxury cars, positioned to emphasize comfort and convenience over handling and high-speed performance.

== Overview ==
The Thunderbird entered production for the 1955 model year, marketed as an upscale, "sporty" two-seat convertible rather than as a sports car, per se — averting direct competition with the Chevrolet Corvette. With the 1958 introduction of second row seating, the Thunderbird led a new market segment, the so-called personal luxury car. Subsequent generations became successively larger until the line was downsized, first in 1977, again for 1980, and once again in 1983.

By the 1990s, the Thunderbird's core market, the large two-door coupe, had fallen almost completely out of favor. Production ended with the 1997 model year, resuming again from 2002 to 2005 as a smaller two-passenger convertible.

From its introduction in 1955 to its end in 2005, production reached over 4.4 million.

== Development ==
A smaller two-seater sports roadster, named the Vega, was developed in 1953 at the request of Henry Ford II. The completed one-off generated interest at the time, but had meager power, European looks, and a correspondingly high cost, so it never proceeded to production. The Thunderbird was similar in concept but was more American in style, more luxurious, and less sport-oriented.

Credit for the development of the original Thunderbird is given to Lewis Crusoe, a former GM executive lured out of retirement by Henry Ford II; George Walker, chief stylist and a Ford vice president; Frank Hershey, chief stylist for the Ford Division; Bill Boyer, designer for the Body Development Studio, who became the manager of the Thunderbird Studio in the spring of 1955; and Bill Burnett, chief engineer. Ford Designer William P. Boyer was the lead stylist on the original 1955 two-seater Thunderbird and also had input in the following series of Thunderbirds that included the 30th Anniversary Edition. Hershey's participation in the creation of the Thunderbird was more administrative than artistic. Crusoe and Walker met in France in October 1951. Walking in the Grand Palais in Paris, Crusoe pointed at a sports car and asked Walker, "Why can't we have something like that?" Some versions of the story claim that Walker replied by telling Crusoe, "Oh, we're working on it..." Although if anything existed at the time beyond casual dream-car sketches by members of the design staff, records of it have never come to light.

Walker promptly telephoned Ford's HQ in Dearborn and told designer Frank Hershey about the conversation with Crusoe. Hershey took the idea and began working on the vehicle. The concept was for a two-passenger open car, with a target weight of 2,525 lb (1,145 kg), a 252 cu in (4.1 L) Ford Y-block Interceptor V8 based on the forthcoming overhead-valve Ford engine slated for 1954 model year introduction, and a top speed over 100 mph (161 km/h). Crusoe saw a painted clay model on May 18, 1953, which corresponded closely to the final car; he gave the car the go-ahead in September after comparing it with current European trends. After Henry Ford II returned from the Los Angeles Auto Show (Autorama) in 1953, he approved the final design concept to compete with the then-new Corvette.

The name was not among the thousands proposed, including rejected options such as Apache (the original name of the P-51 Mustang), Falcon (owned by Chrysler at the time), Eagle, Tropicale, Hawaiian, and Thunderbolt. A Ford stylist who had lived in the southwest submitted the Thunderbird name, a reference to the mythological thunderbird, a supernatural bird of great power and strength of the North American indigenous people.

At the time, Ernest Breech, then chairman of Ford Motor Company, was a member of the Thunderbird Country Club in Rancho Mirage, California. According to club lore, he asked its permission to use the name, which was granted.

== Generations ==
=== First generation (1955–1957) ===
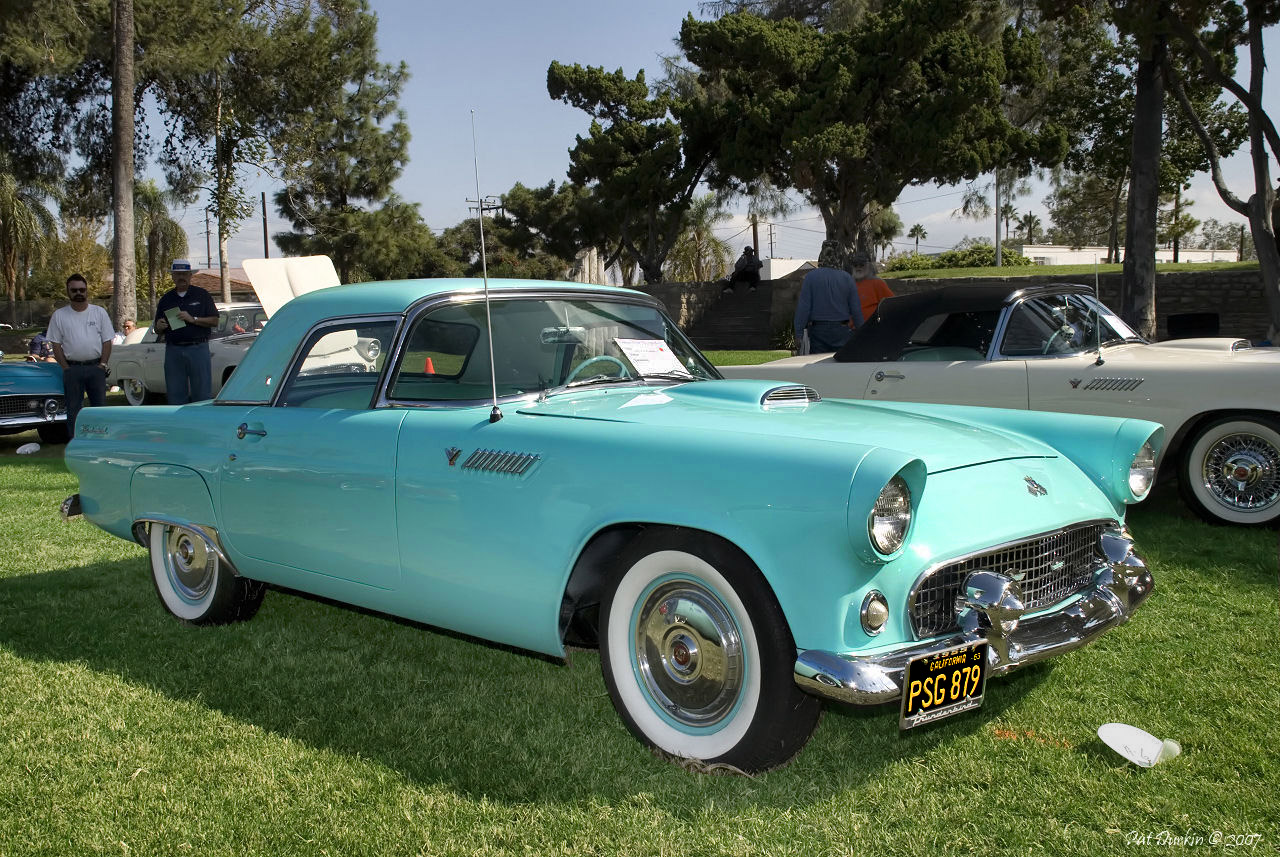
1955 Ford Thunderbird

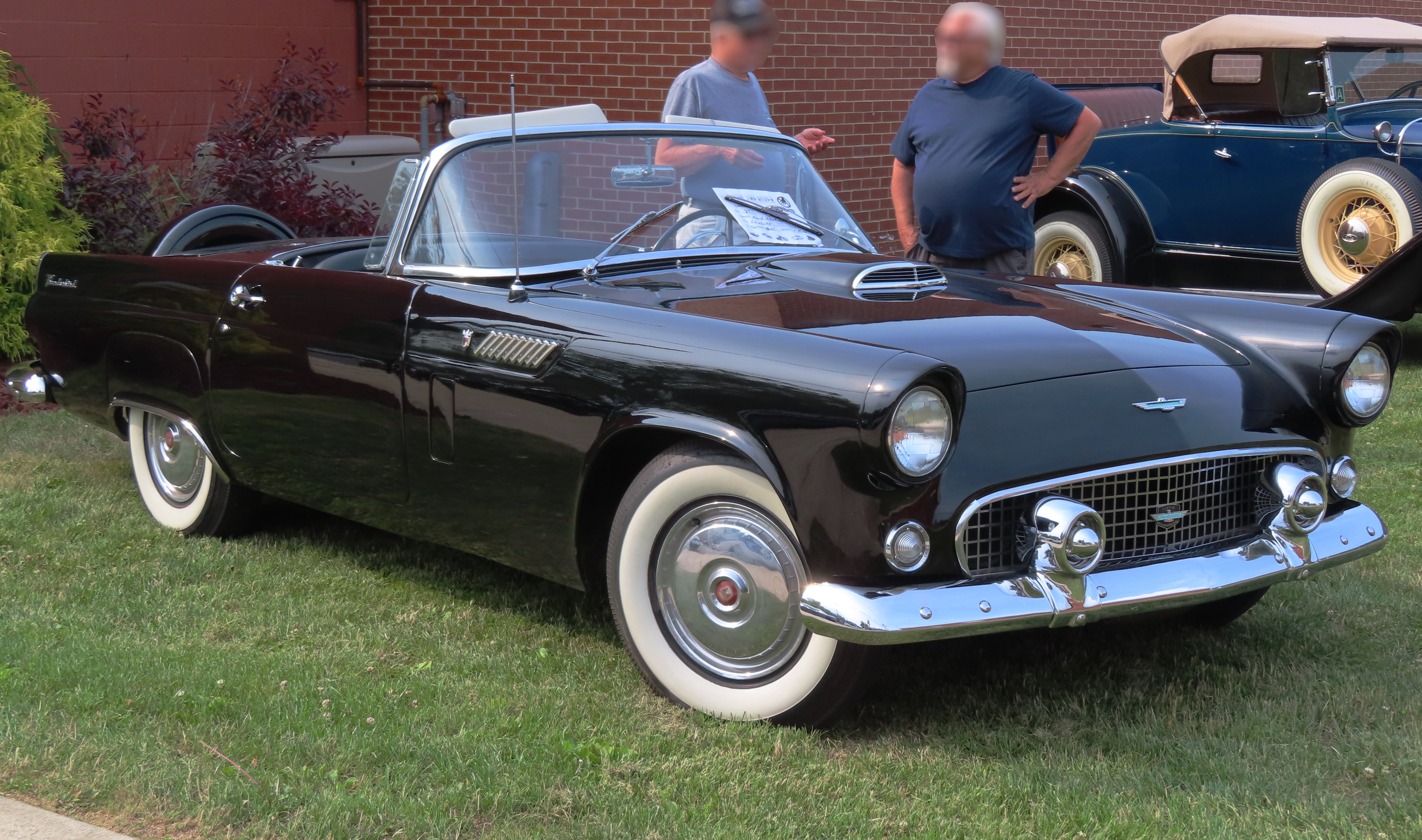
1956 Ford Thunderbird

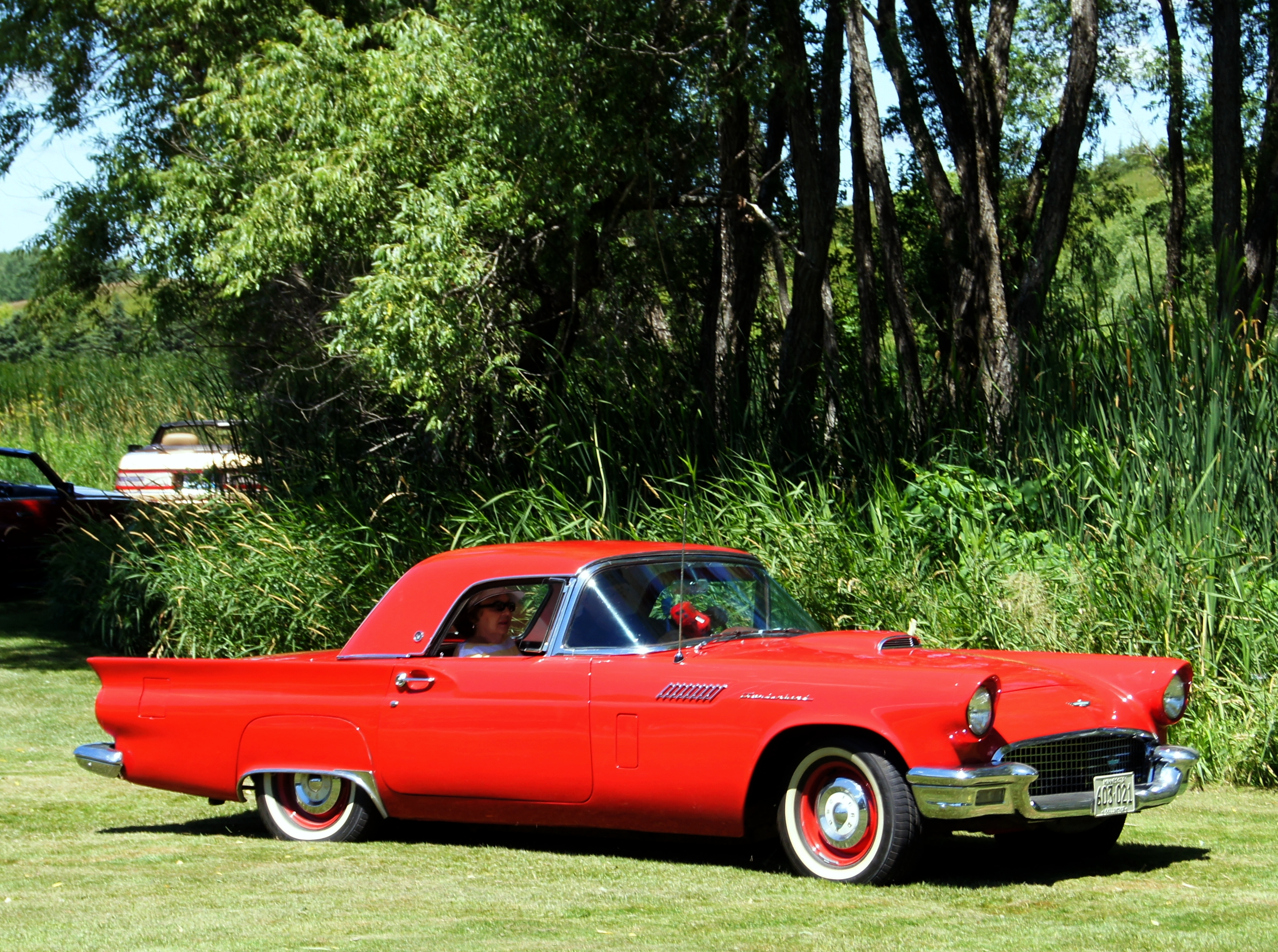
1957 Ford Thunderbird

The Ford Thunderbird was introduced in February 1953 as a response to Chevrolet's new sports car, the Corvette, which was publicly unveiled in prototype form just a month before. Under rapid development, the Thunderbird went from idea to prototype in about a year, being unveiled to the public at the Detroit Auto Show on February 20, 1954. It was a two-seat design available with a detachable fiberglass hardtop and a folding fabric top.

Production of the Thunderbird began on September 9 of that year, with the car beginning sales as a 1955 model on October 22, 1954. Though sharing some design characteristics with other Fords of the time such as single circular headlamps and tail lamps, and modest tail fins, the Thunderbird was sleeker in shape and featured a hood scoop and a 150 mph (240 km/h) speedometer not available on other Fords. It used mechanical components from mass-market Ford models. The Thunderbird's 102.0 in (2,591 mm) wheelbase frame was a shortened version used in other Fords and the standard 292 cu in (4.8 L) Y-block V8 came from Ford's Mercury division.

Though inspired by and positioned directly against the Corvette, Ford advertised the Thunderbird at launch as a "personal car of distinction" and put a greater emphasis on the car's comfort and convenience features rather than its inherent sportiness.

The Thunderbird sold exceptionally well in its first year, outselling the Corvette by more than 23-to-one in 1955 with 16,155 Thunderbirds sold against 700 Corvettes.

With the Thunderbird considered a success, few changes were made to the car for the 1956 model year. The most notable change was moving the spare tire to a Continental-style rear bumper to make more storage room in the trunk and a new 12-volt electrical system. The addition of the weight at the rear caused steering issues. Among the few other changes were new paint colors, the addition of standard circular porthole windows in the fiberglass roof to improve rearward visibility (with a delete option), and a 312 cu in (5.1 L) Y-block V8 rated at 215 hp (160 kW) when mated to a three-speed manual transmission or 225 hp (168 kW) when mated to a Ford-O-Matic three-speed automatic transmission; this transmission featured a "low gear", which was accessible manually via the gear selector. When in Drive, it was a two-speed automatic transmission (similar to Chevrolet's Powerglide). Low gear could also be accessed with a wide-open throttle. In 1956, Ford also added its new Lifeguard safety package.

The Thunderbird was revised for 1957 with a reshaped front bumper, a larger grille and tailfins, and larger tail lamps. The instrument panel was heavily restyled with round gauges in a single pod, and the rear of the car was lengthened, allowing the spare tire to be positioned back in the trunk. The 312 cu in (5.1 L) V8 became the Thunderbird's standard engine, and was rated at an increased 245 hp (183 kW). Other, more powerful versions of this V8 were available, including one with two four-barrel Holley carburetors (VIN code "E"), and another with a Paxton supercharger rated at 300 hp (224 kW) (VIN code "F"). Though Ford was pleased to see sales of the Thunderbird rise to a highest ever 21,380 units for 1957, company executives felt the car could do even better, leading to a substantial redesign of the car for 1958.

=== Second generation (1958–1960) ===
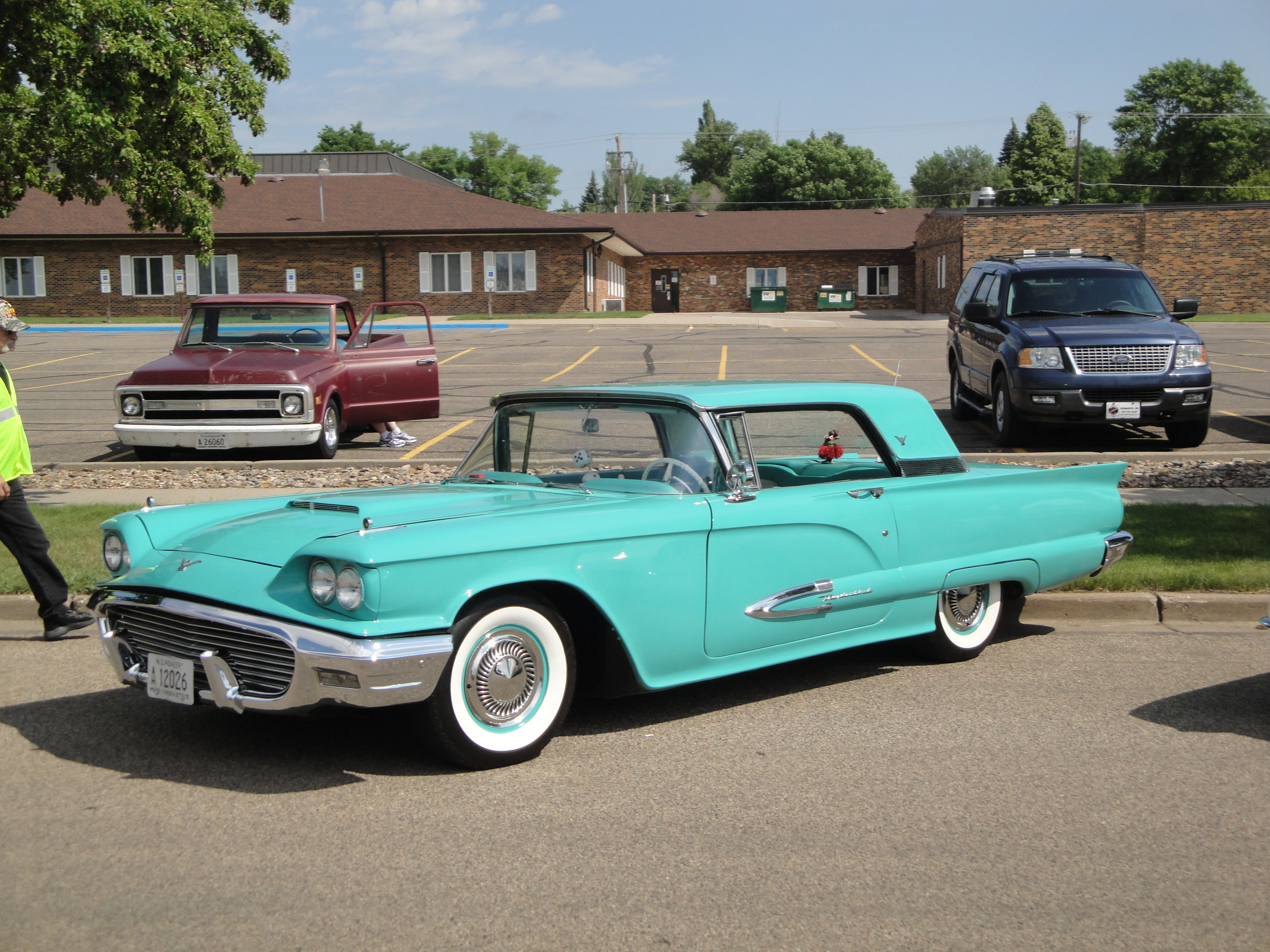
1959 Ford Thunderbird hardtop

Although the 1955–57 Thunderbird was a success, Ford executives—particularly Robert McNamara—were concerned that the car's position as a two-seater limited its sales potential. As a result, the car was redesigned as a four-seater for 1958.

Despite being released mid-model year, the new Thunderbird began a sales momentum previously unseen with the car, selling 200,000 units in three years, four times that of the three-year two-seat model run. This success spawned a new market segment, the personal luxury car. It was the first individual model line (as opposed to an entire brand's line) to earn Motor Trend "Car of the Year" honors.

It was offered in both hardtop and convertible body styles, although the latter was not introduced until June 1958, five months after the release of the hardtop. The new Thunderbird was considerably larger than the previous generation, with a longer 113.0 in (2,870 mm) wheelbase to accommodate the new back seat. The increased size also increased the car's weight by 800 lb (363 kg). Along with a new, more rigid unibody construction was new styling, including quad headlights, more prominent tailfins, a bolder chrome grille, and a larger, though nonfunctional, hood scoop. The engine was the new 300 hp (224 kW) 352 cu in (5.8 L) FE V8, available with a three-speed manual or automatic transmissions. The mid-1958 model year sales were 37,892 units, an increase of 16,000 over the previous year.

For 1959, the Thunderbird featured a new grille and a newly optional 350 hp (261 kW) 430 cu in (7.0 L) MEL V8 engine. Sales increased to 67,456 units.

For the 1960 model year, the grille was again redesigned along with minor styling changes. A new option was a manually operated sunroof for hardtop models. The dual-unit round taillights featured on the 1958 and 1959 were changed to triple-units. Sales increased again, with 92,843 sold in 1960.

=== Third generation (1961–1963) ===
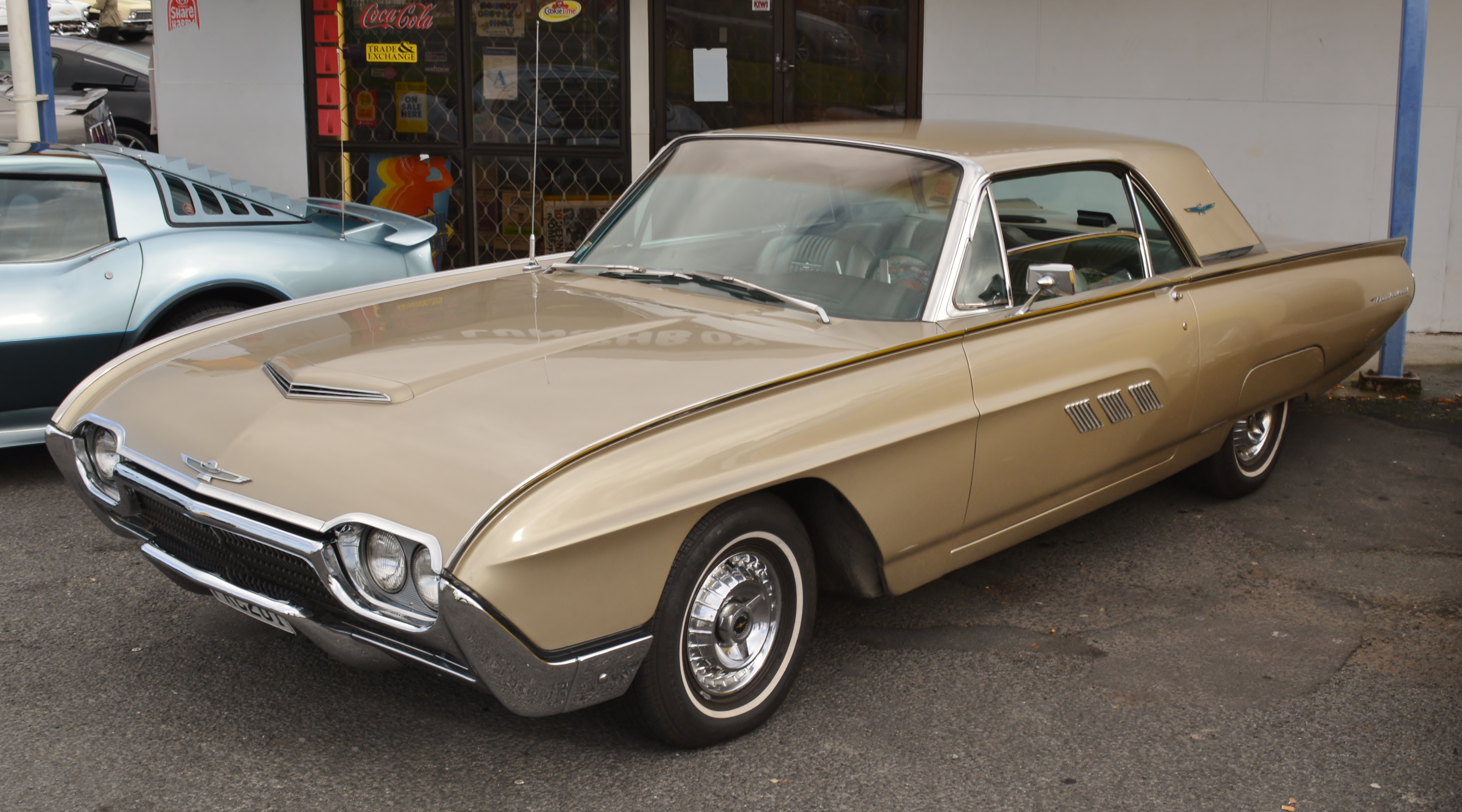
1963 Ford Thunderbird hardtop

The Thunderbird was redesigned for 1961 with styling that gave the car a futuristic bullet-like body-side appearance. A new engine, the 390 cu in (6.4 L) FE V8, was the standard and only engine initially offered in the Thunderbird. It was rated at 300 hp (224 kW) and was mated to a three-speed automatic transmission. The new Thunderbird was well received, with 73,051 sold for 1961.

The car was 1961's Indianapolis 500 pace car and was featured prominently in US President John F. Kennedy's inaugural parade, who appointed Ford executive Robert McNamara as secretary of defense. It also benefitted from product placement, notably on the popular television series 77 Sunset Strip.

A vinyl-roofed Landau option with simulated S-bars was added to the Thunderbird for 1962 as was a Sports Roadster package for convertible models. The Sports Roadster included 48-spoke Kelsey-Hayes-designed wire wheels and a special fiberglass tonneau cover for the rear seats, which gave the car the appearance of a two-seat roadster like the original Thunderbird. The Sports Roadster package was slow-selling due to the high price of the package and the complexity of the tonneau cover.

Newly optional for 1962 was a 340 hp (254 kW)version of the 390 cu in (6.4 L) V8 equipped with three two-barrel Holley carburetors. For 1963 only, The engine was only available in cars equipped with factory air conditioning.

Few other changes were made to the Thunderbird for 1963, as Ford prepared to introduce a new version for 1964. A horizontal styling line was added that ran from the front of the car back through the door. Small diagonal chrome bars were added in this area on the door. Alternators rather than generators were a new feature on all 1963 Thunderbirds.

=== Fourth generation (1964–1966) ===
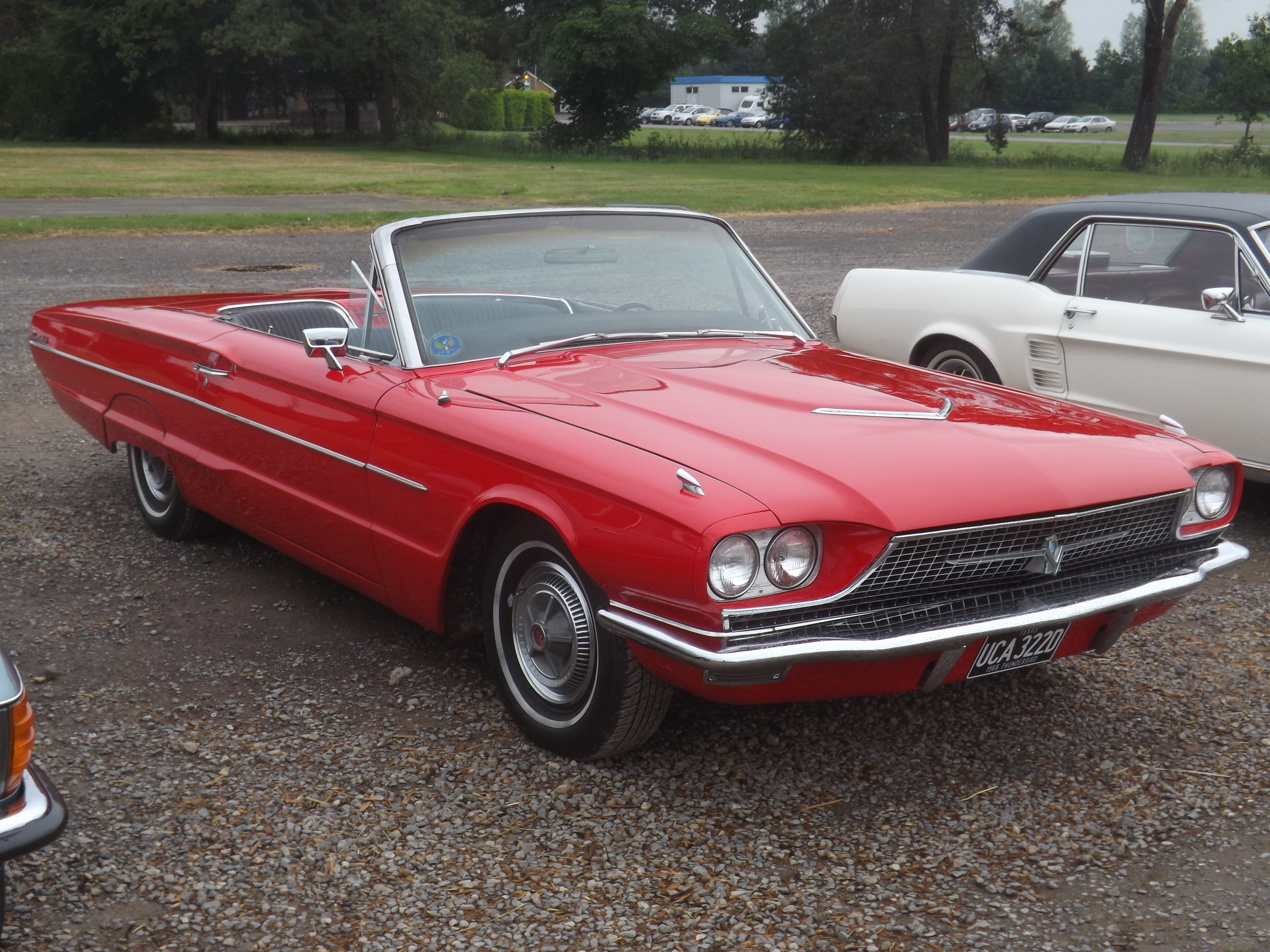
1966 Ford Thunderbird convertible

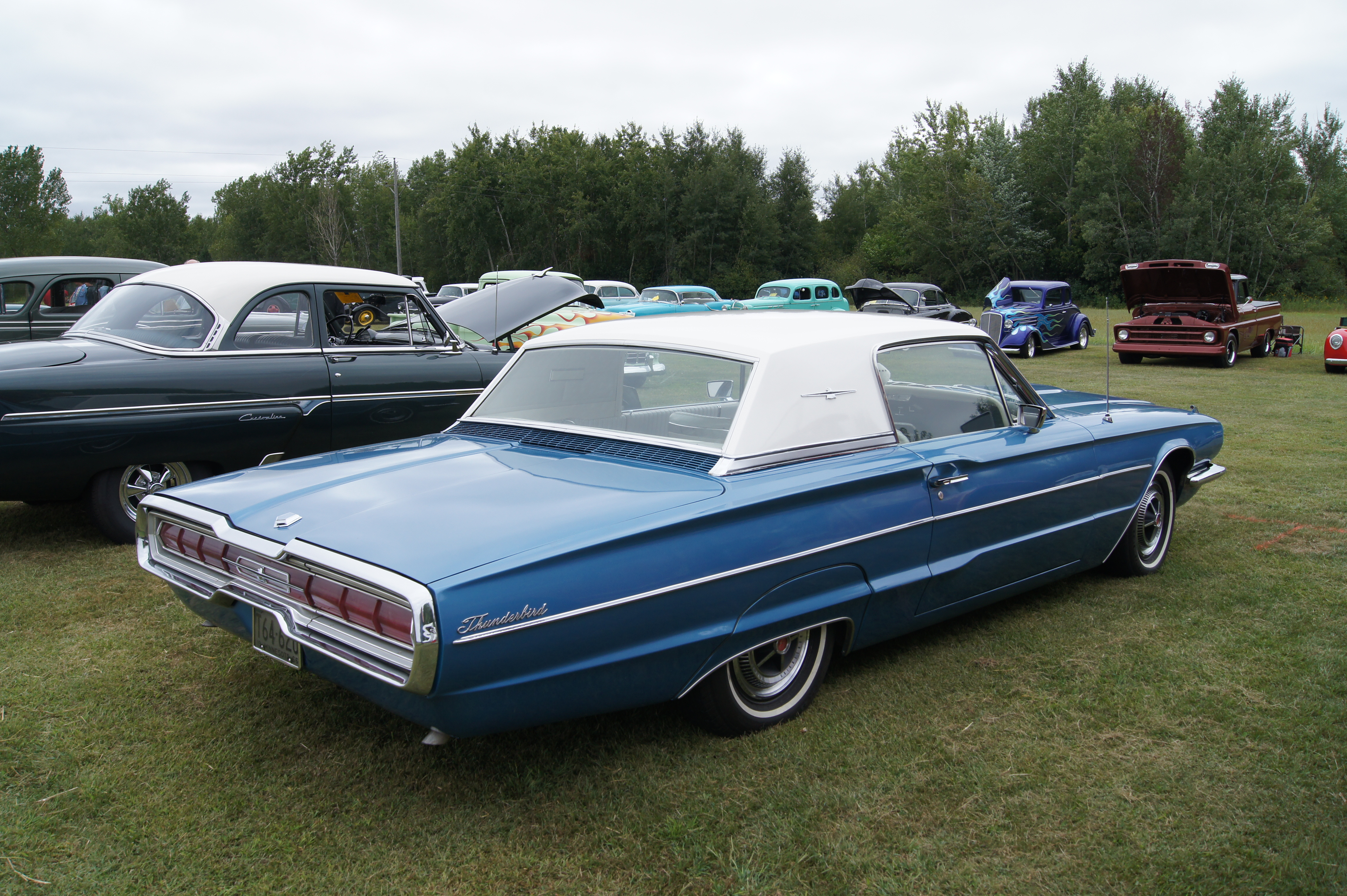
1966 Ford Thunderbird Hardtop. Rear view

1966 Ford Thunderbird at a US car picnic

For 1964, the Thunderbird was restyled in favor of a more squared-off appearance, which was mostly evident when viewing the car from the side or rear. Hinting at its roots in the previous generation of Thunderbird, the new model retained a similar grille design with quad headlights and a 113.2 in (2,875 mm) wheelbase. As before, the new Thunderbird continued to be offered in hardtop, convertible, and landau versions. The 300 hp (224 kW) 390 cu in (6.4 L) FE V8 continued as the standard engine. It was paired with a three-speed automatic transmission. For 1965, sequential turn signals were added, flashing the individual segments of the broad, horizontal tail lights from inside to outside. Also new for 1965 were standard front disc brakes.

The 1966 model received a new egg crate-style grille and a single-blade front bumper. Its restyled rear bumper included new full-width taillamps. The standard 390 cu in (6.4 L) V8 equipped with a single four-barrel carburetor was rated at 315 hp (235 kW), and a 345 hp (257 kW) 428 cu in (7.0 L) FE V8 became the top power option. This was the last year for the convertible until the "retro" models of 2002–05.

=== Fifth generation (1967–1971) ===
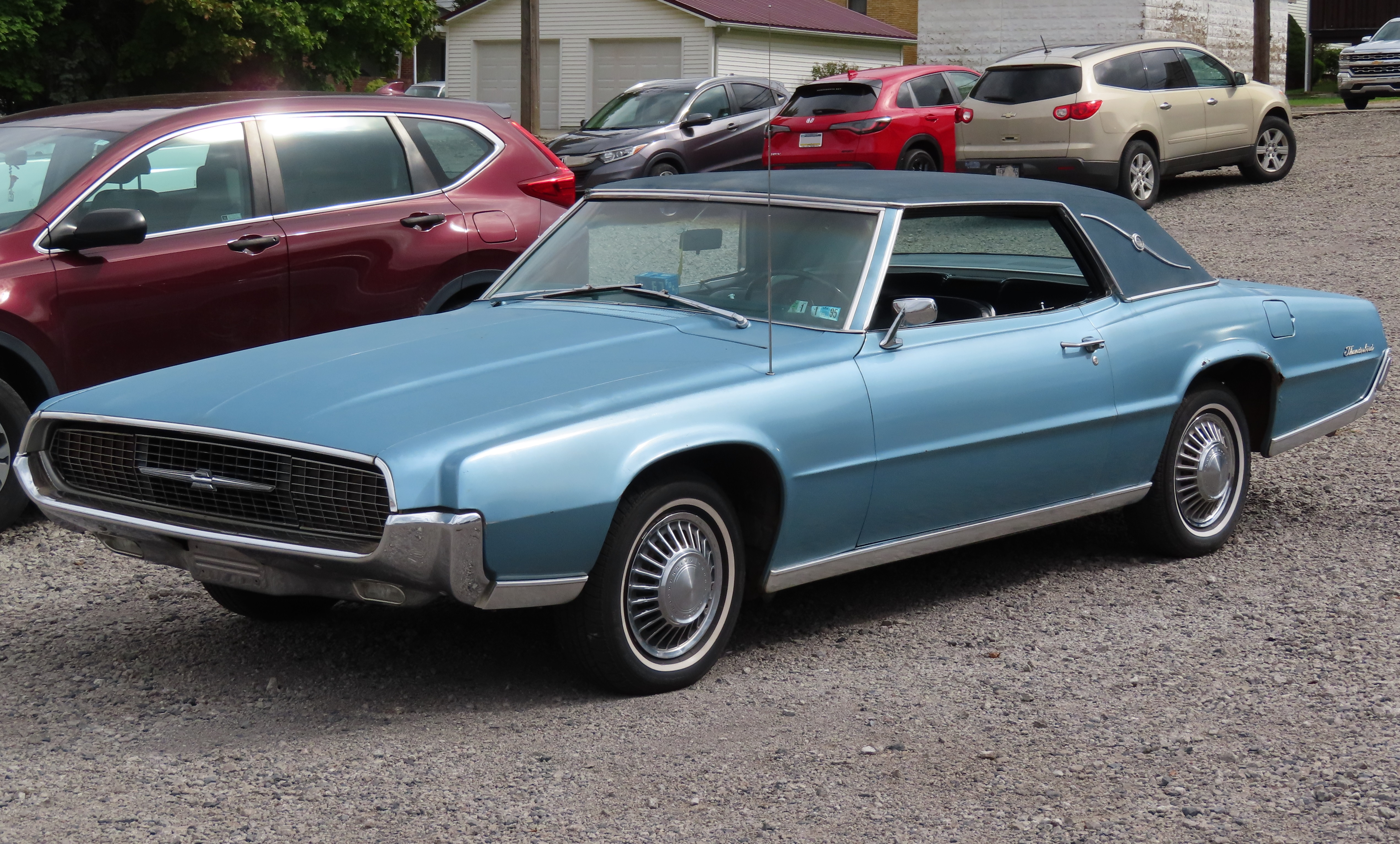
1967 Ford Thunderbird

For 1967, Ford introduced the fifth-generation Thunderbird, bringing several changes to the model line. For its past three generations, the Thunderbird had remained the same in its fundamental concept: a two-door coupe or convertible with at least four seats. In response to the successful 1965 Ford Mustang and the 1967 Mercury Cougar, the Thunderbird expanded its focus on luxury. In another change, the convertible was traded for a four-door sedan. To visually slim the roofline, the four-door was fitted with simulated landau bars; as before, the two-door was offered as a two-door hardtop alongside the landau-style roof (with a full-width C-pillar).

In a fundamental change, the sleek rocket-style appearance was toned down and replaced with a fuselage-style body and large, wide grille; hidden headlamps were used for the first time. For 1969, the Continental Mark III was introduced. While sharing its body-on-frame chassis with the Thunderbird, the Mark III shared no body panels with the Thunderbird.

For 1970, the Thunderbird underwent a complete redesign of its body. Distinguished by its return to exposed headlamps, the 1970 Thunderbird was styled with a smaller grille with a forward-extended center section; the two-door hardtop adopted a sleeker appearance with larger rear side windows. The four-door Thunderbird continued, ending production after 1971; it became the final vehicle produced in the United States with rear-hinged doors until 2019.

Developed in response to the introduction of the Mercury Cougar, the fifth-generation took on a more formal design, later serving as the basis of the Continental Mark III.

=== Sixth generation (1972–1976) ===
For 1972, the sixth-generation Thunderbird was released alongside the Continental Mark IV. Growing to a 120.4-inch wheelbase, the generation became the largest Thunderbird ever produced by Ford. The four-door sedan was discontinued, with the two-door adopting a single hardtop roofline design (differing from the Mark IV in its opera window design). For 1973 and 1974, 5 mph bumpers were added to the model line (ultimately adding 11 inches of length.

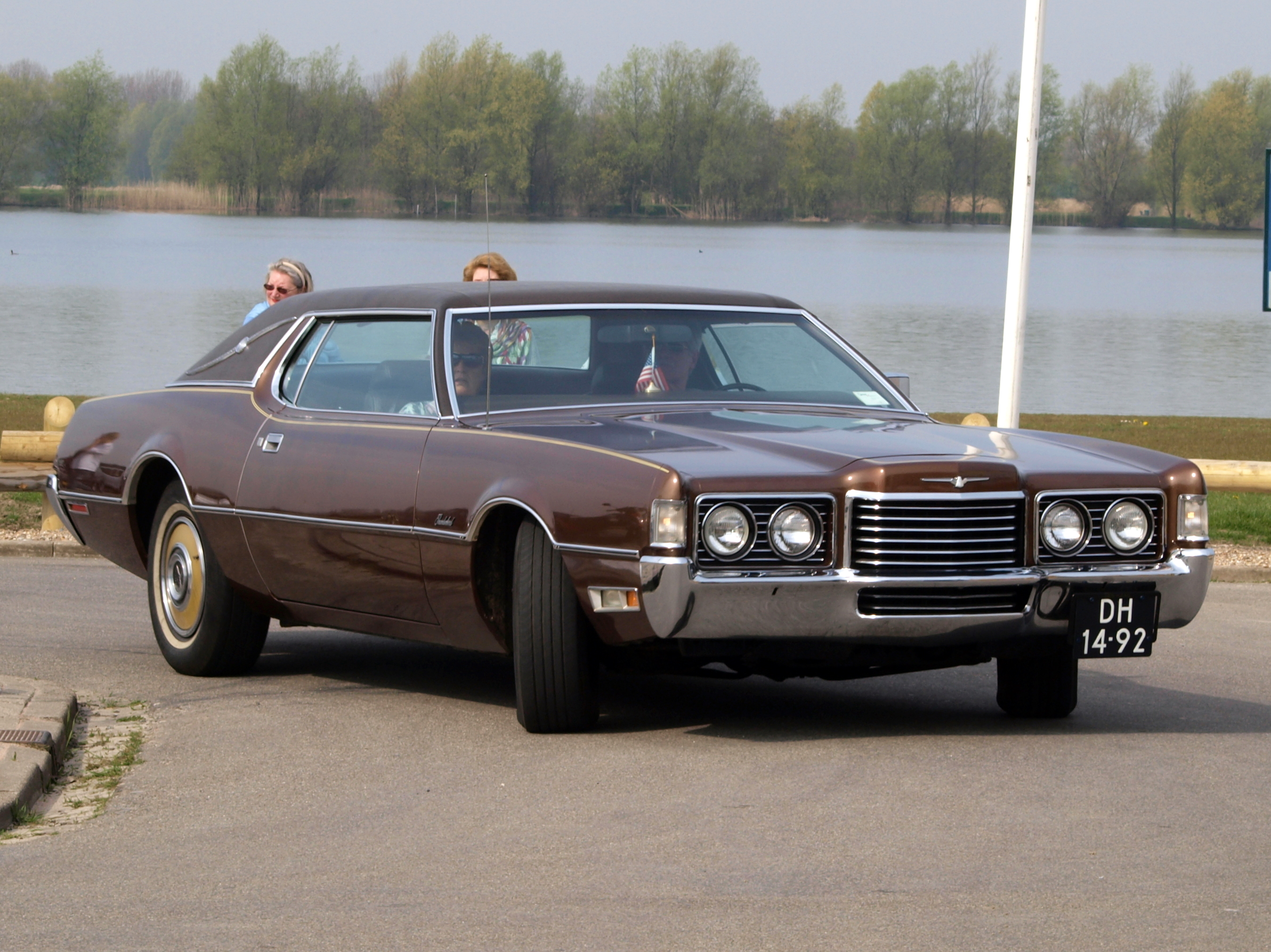
1972 Ford Thunderbird

Initially powered by a 429 cubic-inch V8, a 460 cubic-inch V8 became standard for 1974. Power output decreased over the previous generation, coinciding with the expansion of restrictive emissions technology, with fuel economy correspondingly suffering.

The sixth generation initially fared well in the market, peaking in 1973 at over 87,000. The 1973 oil crisis had a strongly negative effect on sales, falling nearly 50% by 1975. In total, over 299,000 units were sold, making it the most successful generation of the model line at the time.

=== Seventh generation (1977–1979) ===
For 1977, the seventh-generation Thunderbird was released, replacing the Ford Elite coupe. In a pairing that would last for two decades, the Thunderbird became the divisional counterpart of the Mercury Cougar XR7. The redesign brought the model line into the intermediate size segment. Though still a large vehicle, the 1977 Thunderbird shed nearly 8 inches of length and 900 pounds of curb weight. Along with partially downsizing the model line, the Thunderbird was repackaged to face much wider competition in the personal luxury segment, including the Chrysler Cordoba and Dodge Charger and the GM quartet of the Chevrolet Monte Carlo, Buick Regal, Oldsmobile Cutlass Supreme, and Pontiac Grand Prix.

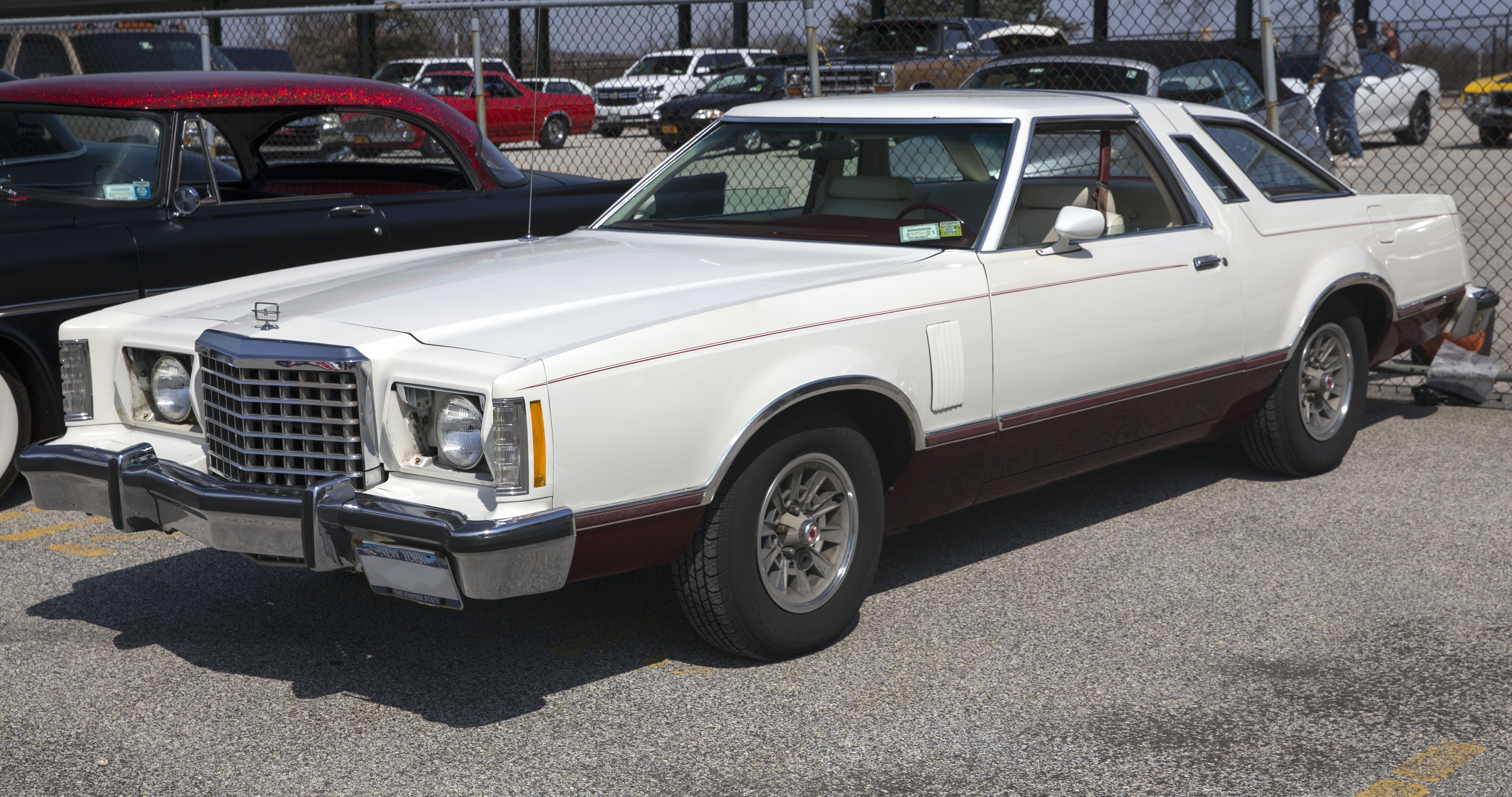
1977–1978 Ford Thunderbird

To distinguish the Thunderbird from the Elite and its Cougar counterpart, the Thunderbird was styled with a model-specific roofline with large B-pillars, opera windows, and large windows in the C-pillar (a design adopted by the 1978 Ford Fairmont Futura coupe); a new option included T-tops (for the first time). A full-width taillamp cluster was retained, with hidden headlamps making their return (though no longer part of the grille). With the Torino chassis, the powertrain underwent substantial revisions, shifting from a single 460 cubic-inch V8 to a three-engine line of small-block V8s; the 302 V8 became standard, with the 351M and 400 V8s offered as an option.

For 1978, Ford commemorated its 75th anniversary with a Diamond Jubilee Edition special-edition Thunderbird, offered alongside the Continental Mark V. The option package nearly doubled the price of Thunderbird to almost $12,000 (equivalent to $59,230 in 2025). The Diamond Jubilee Edition included every available option for the Thunderbird, with only a moonroof and engine block heater optional.

In 1978, Ford offered the "Diamond Jubilee Edition" to commemorate the company's 75th year as an auto manufacturer. This option package virtually doubled the standard price of the car to almost US$12,000. It included every option available except for a moonroof and engine block heater. For 1979, the option package was renamed the Heritage Edition, commemorating the end of full-size Thunderbird production.

Though produced for only three model years, the seventh-generation Thunderbird is the most successful version of the model line, with over 955,000 units produced (nearly matching the combined production of the previous three generations). For 1980, Ford retired all cars derived from the Torino, leading the Thunderbird to become a mid-size car.

=== Eighth generation (1980–1982) ===
For 1980, Ford released the eighth-generation Thunderbird, again the counterpart of the Mercury Cougar XR7. In downsizing the model line a second time, Ford moved the Thunderbird to the Fox platform; in only four model years, the Thunderbird had lost 25 inches of length, 12 inches of wheelbase, and (dependent on powertrain) up to 1,900 pounds of curb weight. As part of the change, the model line changed its seating from six passengers to four. Though remaining a personal luxury car, the redesign eliminated nearly any aspects of performance, as designers scrambled to improve fuel economy and emissions performance.

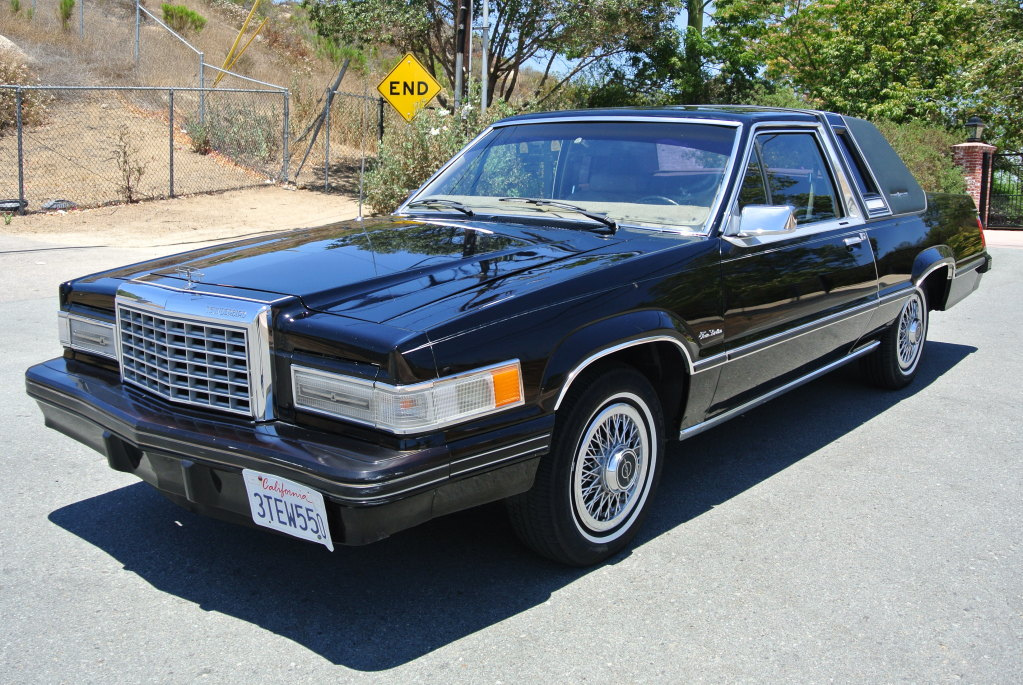
1982 Ford Thunderbird

Taking on an extremely straight-edged appearance, the exterior of the eighth-generation Thunderbird adopted several several design elements from its 1977-1979 predecessor, including its hidden headlamps, grille styling, and taillamp configuration. For the first time, the Thunderbird was configured with fully framed door windows. In optimizing the Fox chassis for fuel economy, the model was fitted with a 4.2 L V8 (producing 115 hp), with the 4.9 L V8 (131 hp) becoming an option. For 1981, a 3.3 L Thriftpower inline-6 became the standard engine (with both V8s as an option), becoming the first six-cylinder Thunderbird; for 1982, the 3.3L inline-6 was replaced by a 3.8 L Essex V6. The two V8 engines were paired with a 4-speed overdrive automatic (Ford AOD), giving the transmission four gears for the first time.

Though it was the most successful generation of the model line, the body design of the 1977–1979 Thunderbird translated poorly on a smaller car, in addition to its lower-power drivetrain. Sales of the 1980 Thunderbird fell nearly 50% over 1979, with a similar decrease for both 1981 and 1982. In contrast to the record-selling seventh-generation, the combined sales from 1980 to 1982 exceeded that of 1979 – by only 4,000 vehicles. Though used by the Thunderbird and Cougar for only three model years, the 1980 Fox platform designed for the Thunderbird would last through 1992, underpinning the Lincoln Mark VII.

=== Ninth generation (1983–1988) ===
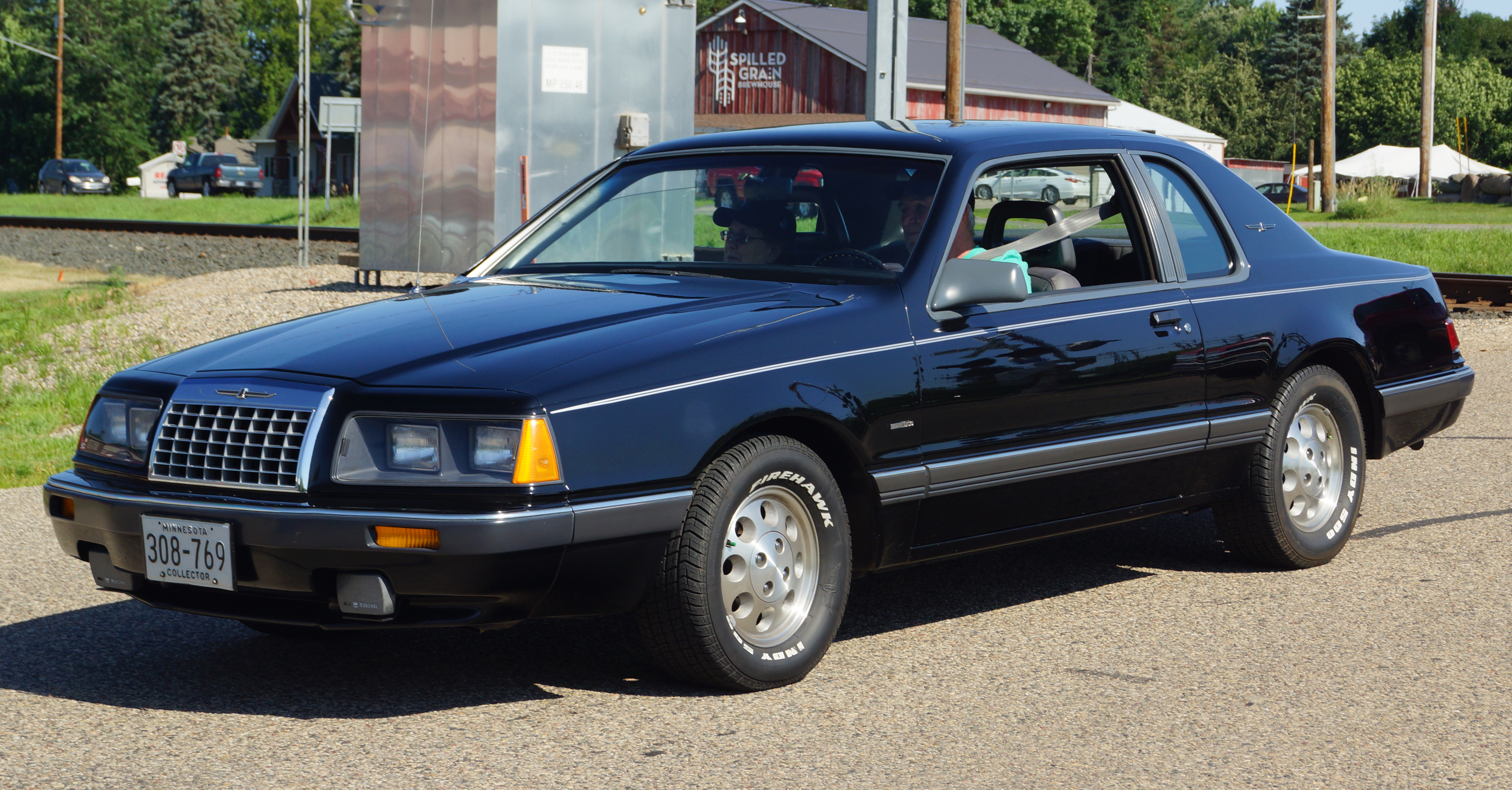
1984 Ford Thunderbird

For 1983, Ford released the ninth generation of the Thunderbird alongside the Mercury Cougar. Developed in response to the negative reception of the 1980 design, the body shared only its Thunderbird emblem with the previous generation, with the ninth-generation Thunderbird taking on a radically sleeker, more aerodynamic body design. In another change, the Thunderbird was styled with its own roofline (for the first time since 1971).

To expedite the redesign, Ford retained the Fox chassis of the previous generation, shortening its wheelbase to 104.2 inches. While the 4.2 L V8 was dropped, the 3.8 L V6 and 4.9 L V8 were carried over; the V8 received electronic fuel injection, with the V6 doing so for 1984. Serving as the flagship of the model line, the Turbo Coupe was introduced for 1983, powered by a 2.3 L Lima inline-4 (becoming the first four-cylinder engine for the model line); the Turbo Coupe also marked the first use of a manual transmission by the model line since 1960.

For 1987, the exterior and interior were completely redesigned, with composite-style headlamps added to the front fascia. Styled without a conventional grille, the Turbo Coupe received an intercooler for its 2.3 L engine (increasing output to 190 hp). The Sport trim was introduced with the 4.9 L V8, pairing the exterior and interior of the Turbo Coupe and a conventional grille.

The market responded well to the ninth-generation Thunderbird, selling nearly 900,000 examples (effectively triple that of the eighth generation).

=== Tenth generation (1989–1997) ===
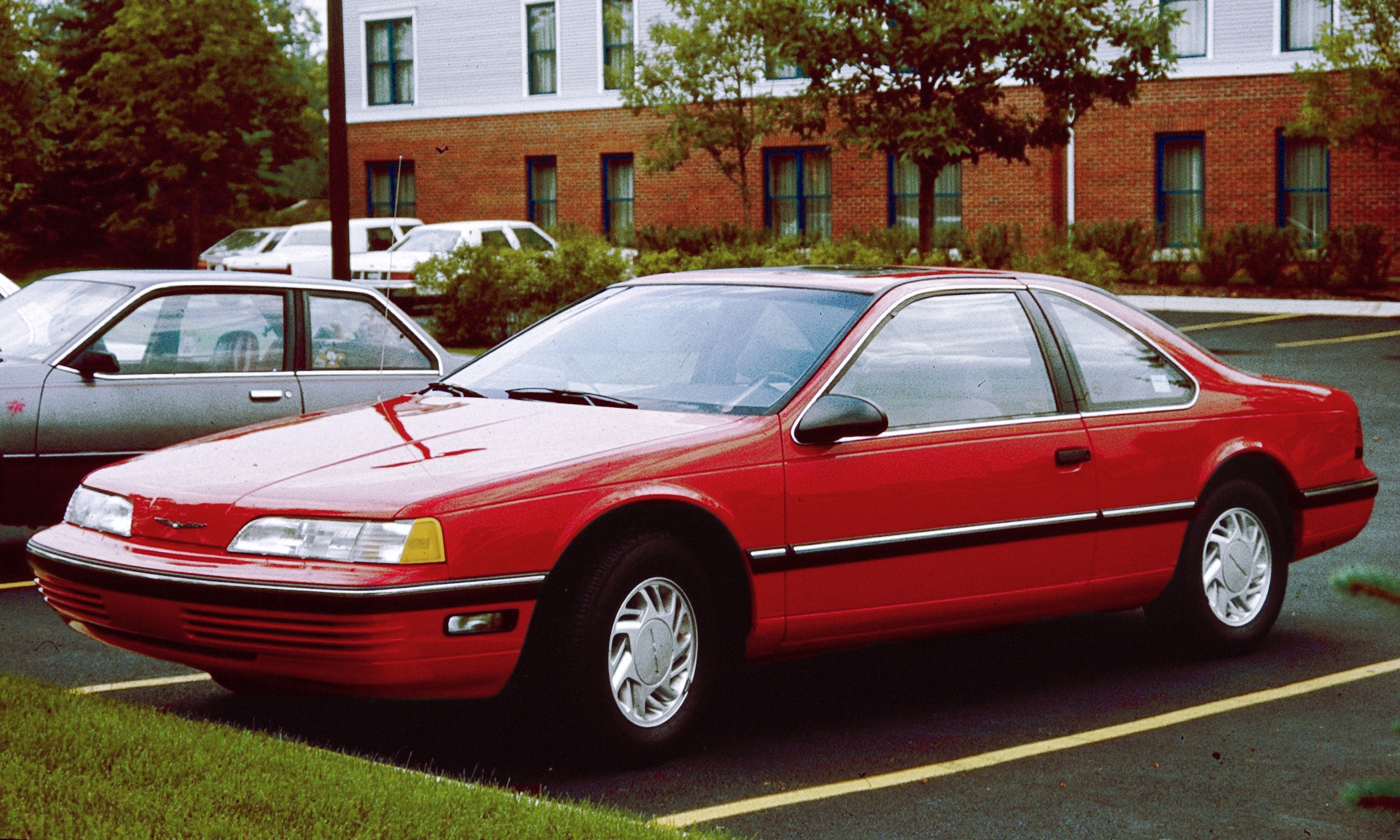
1990 Ford Thunderbird

For the 1989 model year, Ford released the tenth-generation Thunderbird, again serving as the counterpart of the Mercury Cougar. The first ground-up redesign of the model line since 1980, the Thunderbird shed the Fox architecture for the MN12 (mid-sized North American Project 12) platform. For the first time, the Ford Blue Oval emblem was externally shown (on the trunklid).

In development since 1984, the MN12 chassis maintained the traditional rear-wheel drive layout, but extensive changes were made to the overall design of the model line. The wheelbase was extended to 113 inches (9 inches longer than the previous generation) and the solid rear axle was replaced by independent suspension for both front and rear axles. In place of the three engines offered for 1988, the MN12 Thunderbird offered only the 3.8 L (232 cu in) Essex V6. The standard V6 produced 140 hp (104 kW); the Turbo Coupe was replaced by the supercharged and intercooled Super Coupe, increasing output to 210 hp (157 kW).

For 1990, the 4.9 L V8 made its return, producing 200 hp. To commemorate the 35th and 40th anniversary of the model line, Ford sold commemorative editions with exclusive exterior designs.

For 1994, the Thunderbird underwent a substantial revision. Alongside a complete redesign of the interior (partly to accommodate dual airbags), the exterior was restyled with more curvaceous bumpers. In a major change, the 4.9 L V8 was replaced by a 205 hp 4.6 L Modular V8, with the Super Coupe increasing to 230 hp output.

For 1996, the model was revised for a second time (adding sleeker front fascia styling). The Super Coupe was discontinued (along with its manual transmission), with the model largely replaced by a Sport option package for V8-equipped examples (including an upgraded suspension and exterior spoiler).

In March 1997, Ford announced the discontinuation of the MN12 Ford Thunderbird and Mercury Cougar, alongside the Ford Aspire, Ford Probe, Ford Aerostar, and Lincoln Mark VIII. In September 1997, Lorain Assembly produced the final four-seat Thunderbird.

=== Eleventh generation (2002–2005) ===
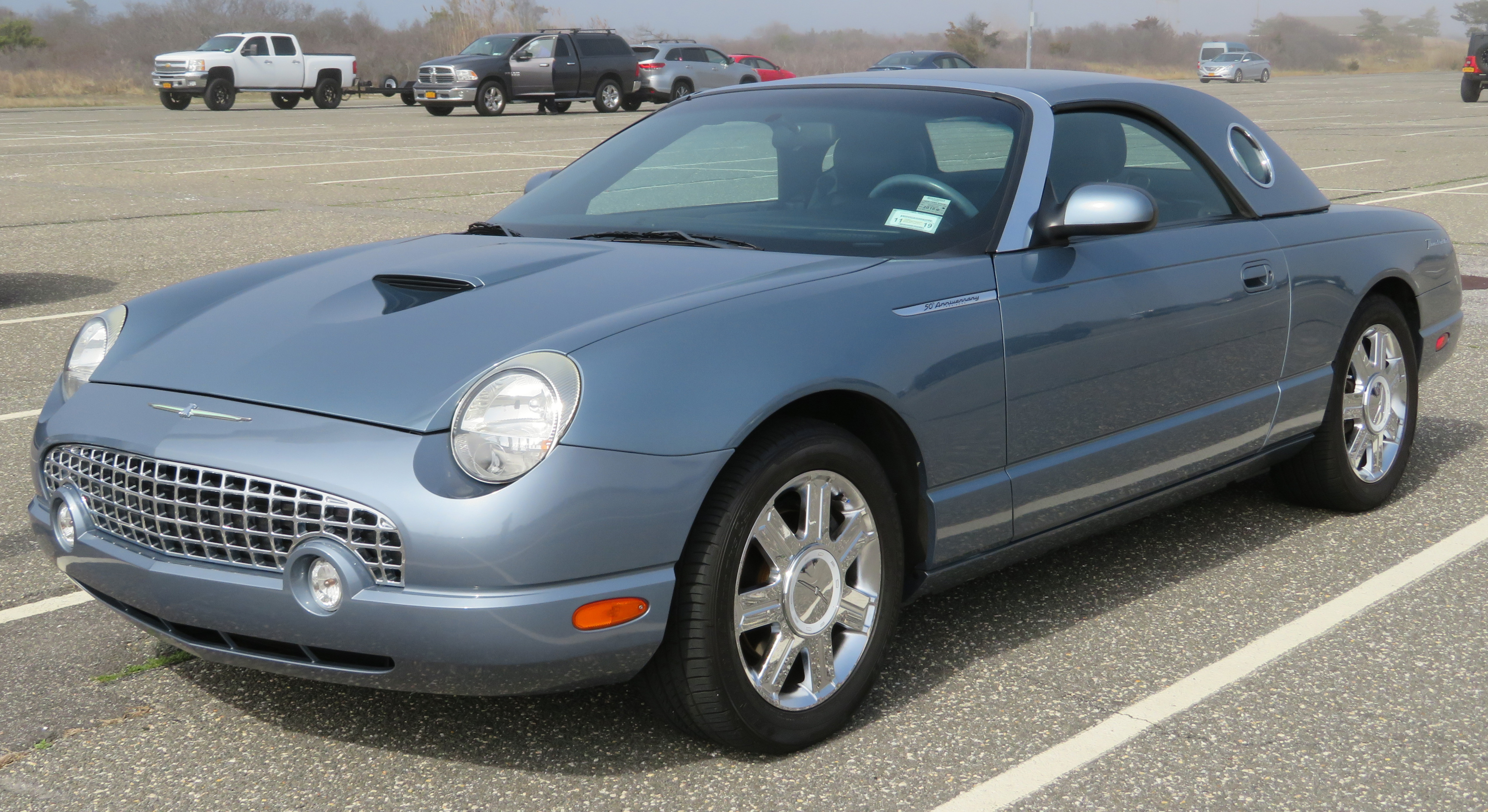
2002–2005 Ford Thunderbird

For the 2002 model year, Ford released the eleventh-generation Thunderbird. Returning after a five-year hiatus, the model line was switched from a 5-seat personal luxury coupe to its original configuration of a two-seat convertible. As with the first generation, the 2002 Thunderbird was touring-oriented, contrasting extensively with the Chevrolet Corvette. Featuring heritage design for both its interior and exterior, the eleventh generation combined design elements from the first generation and the sleeker, minimalist design of the third generation convertibles. A removable hardtop was optional, featuring the porthole-style window in its side (a feature from the 1956–1957 design).

The eleventh-generation Thunderbird adopted the Ford DEW platform, giving it commonality with the Lincoln LS and Jaguar S-Type sedans; the Ford Mustang is loosely based on the platform. Sharing no body panels with the Lincoln/Jaguar sedans, the interior shared several components with the LS (instrument panel, steering wheel, and other trim pieces). As with the LS V8, the Thunderbird used a Jaguar-designed 3.9 L AJ-30 V8, producing 252 hp, paired with a Ford 5R55N 5-speed automatic. For 2003, the engine underwent several major revisions, increasing output to 280 hp; the transmission was upgraded with optional SelectShift manual shifting control.

After 2002, sales of the model line decreased significantly; in April 2003, Ford announced that the eleventh-generation Thunderbird was to be discontinued after the 2005 or 2006 model years. On July 1, 2005, Wixom Assembly produced the final Ford Thunderbird ever built.

== Convertible models ==
Alongside the original two-seat Thunderbirds of 1955-1957, the Thunderbird was offered as a soft-top convertible from 1958 through 1966. The convertible top mechanism was adopted from the Ford Skyliner retractable-hardtop convertible, later appearing in the 1961 Lincoln Continental four-door convertible. When the top was stowed, the rear-hinged trunklid was raised in order for the forward edge of the trunklid to serve as a metal boot cover. Though the hydraulically powered design reduced available trunk space, the metal top boot negated the need for a separate cover. Unlike hardtop models that used a conventional key-secured, forward-hinged design, the convertibles combined the trunk opening and closing within the convertible top operating system.

The top mechanism was complex, consisting of solenoids, relays, limit switches, electric motors, and a hydraulic pump/reservoir; several hydraulic directional valves and cylinders were also part of the design. While the hydraulic system is not often a cause for trouble, electrical relays are known to fail. Malfunction of any of the numerous relays, motors, or limit switches prevents the convertible system from completing the cycle.

For 1962 to 1964, the Ford offered convertible Thunderbirds with a rare "Sports Roadster" option. To give the appearance of a two-seat car, a removable fiberglass tonneau cover was installed over the rear seat. The Sports Roadster was combined with even rarer options, including higher-performance engines and wire-spoke wheels.

== NASCAR ==
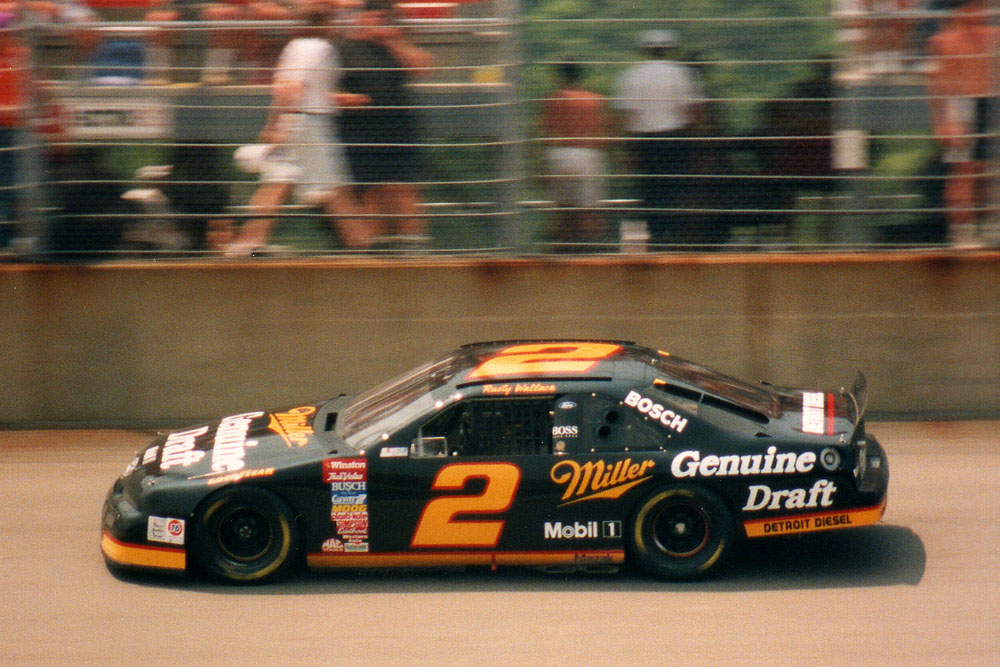
A 1994 NASCAR version of the Thunderbird driven by Rusty Wallace at Michigan International Speedway

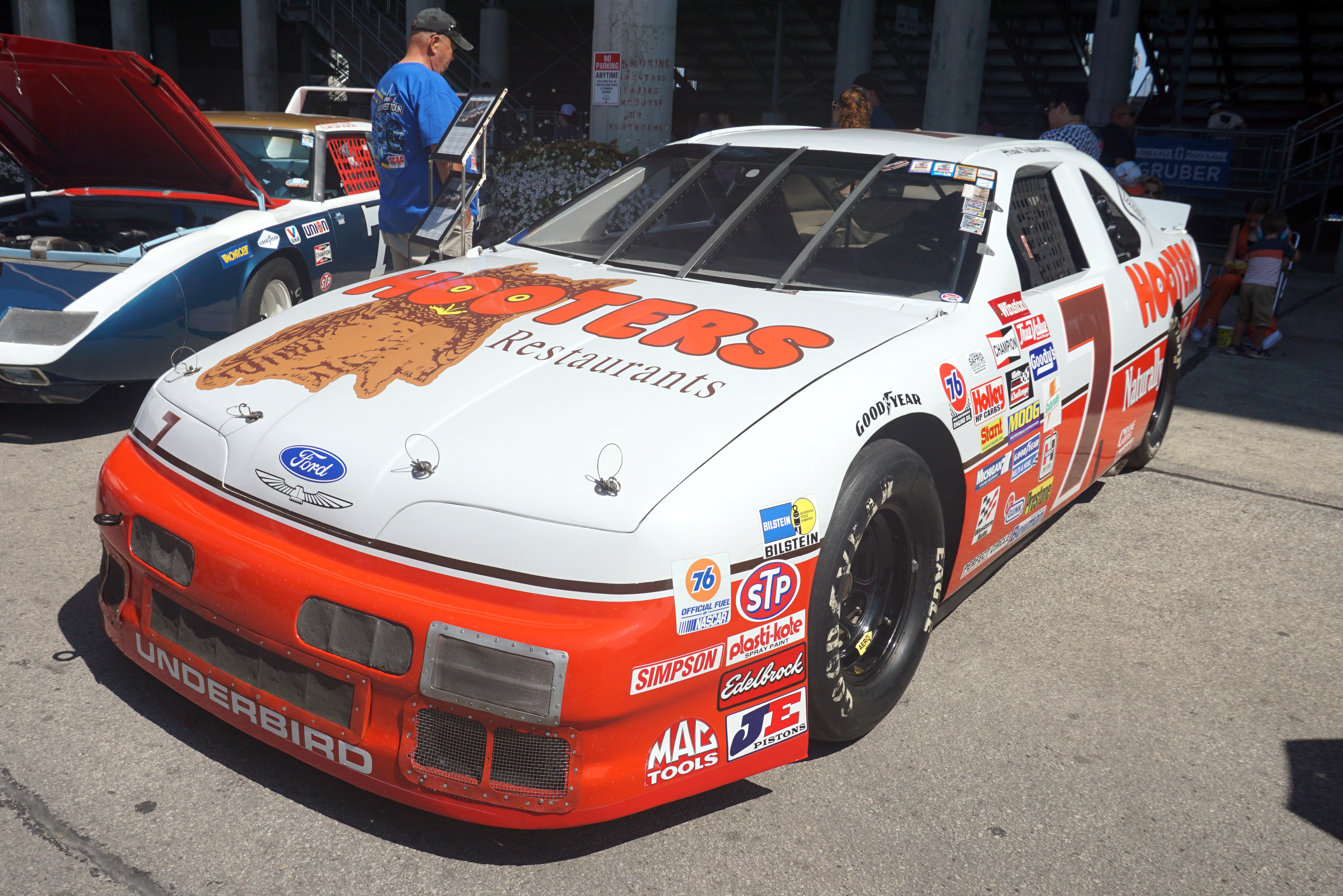
Alan Kulwicki's No. 7 Hooters Ford Thunderbird, with the "Underbird" nameplate

Thunderbirds first made inroads into NASCAR racing in the 1959 season. The combination of the second-generation body style and the newly available 430 CID V8 took drivers Curtis Turner, Johnny Beauchamp, "Tiger" Tom Pistone, and Cotton Owens to victory lane. In the 1960 season, most teams returned to using the conventional full-sized Ford body style, and the T-Bird made only sporadic appearances through the rest of the 1960s, with no additional wins.

Beginning in 1977, Thunderbird-bodied racecars replaced the Torino as Ford's primary body style in NASCAR, starting a trend of luxury coupe-type body styles (eventually the 1981 Imperial would also be seen racing) being used as a sheet-metal source on the race track. Bobby Allison won 13 races with this car driving for owner Bud Moore in the 1977 to 1980 seasons, though the cars looked boxy and un-aerodynamic. During 1981–1997, the downsized and aerodynamically clean Thunderbirds were successful in NASCAR stock car racing before they were replaced by Taurus-based bodies in 1998. The 1983 to 1988-bodied exceeded 200 mph and in one case during a qualifying session set the record of the fastest lap in stock car history at 44.998 seconds with an average speed of 212.809 mph (342.483 km/h) at Talladega Superspeedway, a record that still stands. Bill Elliott and Davey Allison, in particular, were successful with the cars, with Elliott winning the 1988 championship. Alan Kulwicki also won the championship in 1992 in a car nicknamed "Underbird", for his underdog status as a driver. The last time a Thunderbird was used in the Cup Series was when Billy Standridge failed to qualify for the 1999 Daytona 500.
