= Caracole =

Turning maneuver on horseback

The caracole or caracol (from the Spanish caracol - "snail") is a turning maneuver on horseback in dressage and, previously, in military tactics.

In dressage, riders execute a caracole as a single half turn, either to the left or to the right, representative of the massed cavalry tactic of caracole previously used in the military.

== Military use ==
Variations of the military caracole has a long history of usage by various cavalry forces that used missile weapons throughout history. The Scythians and Parthians were thought to use it, while ancient Iberian cavalry famously developed their own variation known as the 'Cantabrian circle'. It was noted in the 13th century to be used by the Mongols of Genghis Khan and also by the Han Chinese military much earlier (likely learning it from their battles with the Xiongnu nomads). It was later revived by European militaries in the mid-16th century in an attempt to integrate gunpowder weapons into cavalry tactics. Equipped with one or more wheellock pistols or similar firearms, cavalrymen would advance on their target at less than a gallop in formation as deep as twelve ranks. As each rank came into range, the soldiers would turn their mount slightly to one side, discharge one pistol, then turn slightly to the other side to discharge another pistol at their target. The horsemen then retired to the back of the formation to reload, and then repeat the manoeuvre. The whole caracole formation might move slowly forward as each rank fired to help press the attack, or move slowly backward to avoid an enemy's advance. Despite this complex manoeuvring, the formation was kept dense rather than open, as the cavalrymen were generally also armed and armoured for melee, and hoped to follow the caracole with a charge. The tactic was accompanied by the increasing popularity of the German Reiter in Western armies from about 1540.

The effectiveness of the caracole is debated. This tactic was often successfully implemented, for instance, at the battle of Pinkie Cleugh, where the mounted Spanish herguletier under Dom Pedro de Gamboa successfully harassed Scottish pike columns. Likewise, at the battle of Dreux mercenary German reiters in the Huguenot employ inflicted huge casualties on the Royal Swiss pike squares, although they failed to break them. At the battle of Lützen in 1632, the Swedish Brigade suffered 50% casualties and retreated from Johann von Götzen's Imperial cuirassier and Ottavio Piccolomini's cavalry arquebusier regiments who used the caracole effectively.

Some historians after Michael Roberts associate the demise of the caracole with the name of Gustavus Adolphus of Sweden (1594–1632). Certainly he regarded the technique as fairly useless, and ordered cavalry under Swedish command not to use the caracole; instead, he required them to charge aggressively like their Polish-Lithuanian opponents. However, there is plenty of evidence that the caracole was falling out of use by the 1580s at the latest. Henry IV's Huguenot cavalry and Dutch cuirassiers were good examples of cavalry units that abandoned the caracole early on — if they ever used it at all.

According to De la Noue, Henry IV's pistol-armed cavalrymen were instructed to deliver a volley at close quarters and then "charge home" (charge into the enemy). Ranks were reduced from twelve to six, still enough to punch a hole into the classic thin line in which heavy lancers were deployed. That was the tactic usually employed by cavalry since then, and the name reiter was replaced by cuirassier. Sometimes it has been erroneously identified as caracole when low morale cavalry units, instead of charging home, contented themselves with delivering a volley and retire without closing the enemy, but in all those actions the distinctive factor of the caracole, the rolling fire through countermarching, was absent.

The caracole was rarely tried against enemy cavalry, as it could be easily broken when performing the maneuver by a countercharge. The last recorded example of the use of the caracole against enemy cavalry ended in disaster at the battle of Klushino in 1610, when the Polish hussars smashed a unit of Russian reiters, which served as the catalyst for the rout of much of the Russian army. The battle of Mookerheyde (1574) was also another example of the futility in using caracole against aggressive enemy cavalry, as 400 Spanish lancers charged 2,000 German reiters (in Dutch employ) while the second line was reloading their pistols, easily routing the whole force and later the whole Dutch army as well. It is significant that 20 years later, the Dutch cuirassiers easily routed the same Spanish lancers at the battle of Turnhout and the battle of Nieuwpoort, so that according to Charles Oman, in 1603 lancers were finally disbanded from the Spanish army. Nevertheless, variations of caracole tactics continued to be used well into the 17th century against enemy cavalry. During the battle of Gniew of 1626, the Polish light cavalry used it with success twice. The first time light cavalry units under Mikołaj Abramowicz fired at the Swedish cavalry rank by rank, but instead of withdrawing to reload, it immediately proceeded to charge the enemy with sabres. Later the same unit also tried the caracole using gaps in the line of charging husaria heavy cavalry.

16th- and 17th-century sources do not seem to have used the term "caracole" in its modern sense. John Cruso, for example, explained the "caracoll" as a maneuver whereby a formation of cuirassiers received an enemy's charge by wheeling apart to either side, letting the enemy rush in between the pincers of their trap, and then charging inwards against the flanks of the overextended enemy.

== Sources ==
- Cruso, John, Militarie Instructions for the Cavallrie
- La Noue, F. Discours Politiques et Militaires
- Oman, C. The Art of War in the Sixteenth Century
- Wilson, Peter H. (2018). Lützen: Great Battles Series. Oxford: Oxford University Press. ISBN 978-0199642540.
