= Casuso =

Casuso is a surname. Notable people with the surname include:

- Roberto Casuso (1954–2011), Cuban handball player
- Teresa Casuso Morín (1912–1994), Cuban intellectual

== See also ==
- Caruso (surname)
