= Paul Caruso =

Paul Caruso may refer to:

- Paul Caruso (lawyer)
- Paul Caruso (drummer)
