= Ford Vega =

Overview
- Manufacturer: Ford
- Production: 1953
- Designer: Vince Gardner

Body and chassis
- Class: Sports car
- Body style: 2-door roadster
- Layout: Front-engine, rear-wheel drive

Powertrain
- Engine: 136 in^{3} (2.2 L) Flathead V8
- Transmission: Three-speed manual

The Ford Vega was the winning entry in a Ford-sponsored automotive design contest completed in 1953. Only one example was created.

== History ==
GIs returning after serving overseas in the years following World War II were bringing home MGs, Jaguars, Alfa Romeos, and similar European sports cars, a category that largely did not exist for American manufacturers. In 1951, Nash Motors began selling an expensive two-seat sports car, the Nash-Healey, that was made in partnership with the Italian designer Pininfarina and British auto engineer Donald Healey, but there were few moderate-priced models.

GM responded with the hand-built, EX-122 pre-production Corvette prototype, first shown on January 17, 1953. Production began six months later, with the fiberglass bodied Chevrolet Corvette (C1)

Ford also responded. The Ford Vega was conceived as an entry to a Ford-sponsored design contest, Henry Ford II expressed interest and provided the additional financing needed for the completion of the lightweight, two-seat roadster.

The contest rules specified a British Ford Anglia chassis mounted to a Phil Weiand-built Ford flathead V8 modified with dual carburetors, high-compression cylinder heads and tube-type exhaust headers.

The winning design was from Vince Gardner, who began his career as a clay modeler working for Gordon M. Buehrig during the design of the Cord 810. Some styling touches, such as the pop-up headlamps, were Cord-inspired details. The lightweight body was fabricated from aluminum by metalsmith Emil Deidt.

== Influence ==
Celebrities such as Groucho Marx and Howard Hughes were offered private viewings of the Vega by invitation of Henry Ford II. Henry Ford II proudly displayed the car at the firm's 50th anniversary.

Gardner had planned on producing an inexpensive fiberglass version of the Vega to be offered in kit form, unfortunately, the rights to the vehicle's design were the property of Ford according to the rules of the original contest. While Ford did show enthusiasm the Vega was a one-off project that ultimately did not enter series production. As an exercise, however, it was a success.

The production of a stylish roadster kindled interest within Ford concerning making its own modern sporty roadster, which led directly to the creation of the highly successful 2 seat Ford Thunderbird in 1955.

The Thunderbird convertible held the same niche as the Vega would have. After the introduction of the Ford Mustang in 1964, the Thunderbird increased in size and shifted emphasis away from these performance aspirations and towards increased luxury, so as not to cannibalize sales within the Ford enterprise.

== Eventual fate ==
The single car was displayed for several years in the Ford Rotunda Exhibition Center in Dearborn, Michigan, remaining in the property of Ford. In the 2006 Barrett-Jackson Scottsdale Auction it was sold for $385,000 to private collector Sam Pack, in whose possession it remains.
