= Carusi =

Carusi may refer to:

- Carusu, child labourers in Sicilian sulfur mines
- 4700 Carusi, a minor planet
- Nazzareno Carusi, Italian pianist
- Carusi's Saloon, a 19th century social venue in Washington, D.C.

== See also ==
- Caruso (disambiguation)
