= Anthony Caruso =

Anthony Caruso may refer to:

- Anthony Caruso (actor) (1916–2003), American actor
- Anthony Caruso (entrepreneur), president and CEO of CSA Group
