= Crusoe =

Crusoe may refer to:

== Art, entertainment, and media ==
- Crusoe (film), a 1989 film by Caleb Deschanel based on the novel Robinson Crusoe
- Crusoe (TV series), a 2008 television series based on the novel Robinson Crusoe
- Crusoe the Dachshund, internet celebrity
- Crusoe, a creature featured in the 2007 film The Water Horse: Legend of the Deep

== People ==
- Celina Crusoe (born 1974), Argentine volleyball player
- Lewis Crusoe, automobile executive
- Crusoe Kuningbal (1922–1984), Aboriginal Australian artist
- Crusoe Kurddal (born 1960/1961), Aboriginal Australian artist

== Other ==
- Transmeta Crusoe, a computer processor family by Transmeta Corporation

== See also ==
- Robinson Crusoe (disambiguation)
- Cruso (disambiguation)
