= Ernest R. Breech =

Ernest Robert Breech (24 February, 1897 – 3 July, 1978) was an American corporate executive. Although he is widely known for his work in revitalizing Ford Motor Company in the years following World War II, he served similar roles at Trans World Airlines and other companies.

Breech was drafted by the St. Louis Browns but opted to attend Drury College instead. Breech was a founding member of Phi Alpha Sigma, later Theta Kappa Nu Fraternity (now Lambda Chi Alpha).

Breech dropped out of college, later taking correspondence courses before taking his Certified Public Accountant exam. Breech worked for the Checker Cab Company, General Motors, and Bendix Aviation before being persuaded by Henry Ford II to come aboard at Ford.

Breech served as Ford Motor Company's chairman. Then in 1960, he was a member of the three-person trust overseeing Trans World Airlines' jet financing plan.

He was inducted into the Automotive Hall of Fame in 1979.

Breech was a 33rd degree Freemason. His induction to that degree was highlighted in the October 8, 1956 issue of Life magazine.

The Breech School of Business at Drury University is named in his honor due to his donation. The Louise G. Wallace Hospital in Lebanon, Missouri was renamed Breech Medical Center in 1979. The hospital was replaced by a new facility, Mercy Hospital Lebanon, in 1999.

A Great Lakes freighter acquired by the Ford Motor Co.'s dedicated fleet was renamed in his honor until the ship's sale in 1988. As of 2017, that freighter sailed for Lower Lakes Transportation as the Ojibway."Ojibway".

Business positions
Preceded by Henry Ford II	Executive Vice-President of Ford Motor Company; 1946-1955	Succeeded by Lewis Crusoe
Preceded by Henry Ford	Chairman of Ford Motor Company; 1955-1960	Succeeded by Henry Ford II
