= Caruso (fashion brand) =

Italian luxury fashion brand

Raffaele Caruso S.p.A.
- Industry: Fashion
- Founded: 1958; 68 years ago
- Founder: Raffaele Caruso
- Headquarters: Soragna, Italy
- Key people: Marco Angeloni (CEO)
- Revenue: €40 million (2023)
- Owner: MondeVita
- Number of employees: 450 (2024)
- Parent: Mondevo Group
- Website: carusomenswear.com

Caruso is an Italian luxury menswear manufacturer based in Soragna, near Parma, Italy.

Founded in 1958, the company produces its own ready-to-wear collections and manufactures menswear collections for various international luxury brands. Its production is carried out at its Soragna facility, where traditional Neapolitan tailoring techniques are integrated with modern industrial processes. The company generates annual revenues of approximately €35 million.

== History ==
The company was founded in 1958 by Raffaele Caruso, a Neapolitan tailor who established the Fabbrica Sartoriale Italiana in Soragna, Emilia-Romagna. It opened its first flagship store in New York City in 2014.

Aiming to modernize the company while maintaining its artisanal heritage, former Brioni CEO Umberto Angeloni acquired Caruso in 2009. Eight years later, the Chinese investment group Fosun became its largest shareholder after a capital increase.

After the transaction involving Fosun was completed, Umberto and Ruggero Magnoni retained a minority stake in the Italian firm through their holding company Aplomb. Umberto's son and former former operations director, Marco Angeloni, was appointed CEO following the acquisition.

In 2019, a year after reportedly having 600 employees, Caruso appointed Aldo Maria Camillo, a former designer at Zegna, Valentino, Cerruti 1881, and Berluti, as its first creative director. It closed its Milan and Paris boutiques to concentrate on wholesale operations, relocated its Milan showroom from Via Montenapoleone to Largo Augusto, and opened a permanent showroom at 501 Madison Avenue in New York.

When Max Kibardin succeeded Camillo in his role in January 2023, the firm maintained its focus on tailoring but also expanded its product line to include coats and knitwear, and reduced its sportswear lines. In the same year, Caruso's revenue increased by approximately 30%, reaching €40 million, making it the fastest-growing brand within Fosun's Lanvin Group.

As of 2024, it employed about 450 people at its Soragna facility, which the group described as the largest menswear production site in Italy.

On February 7, 2026, Caruso was acquired by MondeVita, the lifestyle and luxury division of the Mondevo Group.

== Legacy ==
In 2018, the municipality of Soragna named a street Via Caruso in honour of Raffaele Caruso, recognising his role in the local textile industry.
