= Robinson Crusoe (disambiguation) =

Robinson Crusoe is a 1719 book by Daniel Defoe.

Robinson Crusoe or The Adventures of Robinson Crusoe may also refer to:

- The Farther Adventures of Robinson Crusoe, the lesser-known sequel
- Serious Reflections of Robinson Crusoe, a 1720 book

== Adaptations of the novel ==
=== Films ===
- Robinson Crusoe (1902 film), a French silent film by Georges Méliès (French: Les aventures de Robinson Crusoë)
- The Adventures of Robinson Crusoe (serial), a 1922 American adventure film serial
- Robinson Crusoe (1927 film), a British silent film by M.A. Wetherell
- Robinson Crusoe (1947 film), a Soviet film by Aleksandr Andriyevsky (Russian: Робинзон Крузо)
- Robinson Crusoe (1954 film), a Mexican film by Luis Buñuel, made in English and Spanish (Spanish: Aventuras de Robinson Crusoe)
- Robinson Crusoe (1997 film), a British/American film by Rod Hardy and George T. Miller
- Robinson Crusoe (2016 film), a Belgian/French animated film by Vincent Kesteloot and Ben Stassen, released as The Wild Life in North America

=== Television ===
- The Adventures of Robinson Crusoe (TV series), a 1964 French-German children's television drama series
- Robinson Crusoe, a 1972 animated television film, aired as part of the CBS anthology series Famous Classic Tales
- "Robinson Crusoe", a 1973 episode of the Rankin/Bass animated anthology series Festival of Family Classics
- "Robinson Crusoe" (Play of the Month), a 1974 installment of the BBC anthology series Play of the Month

=== Operetta ===
- Robinson Crusoé (1867), an operetta by Jacques Offenbach

== Places ==
- Robinson Crusoe Airport
- Robinson Crusoe House
- Robinson Crusoe Island, Chile
- Robinson Crusoe Island (Fiji)

== Other uses ==
- Robinson Crusoe economy, a framework to study trade in economics
- Robinson Crusoes of Warsaw, or Robinsons, individuals who hid in ruins of Warsaw after the World War II Warsaw Uprising
- "Robinson Crusoe", a version of the theme from the 1964 TV series by Art of Noise from Below the Waste (1989)
- Robinson Crusoe, USN, a 1945 book concerning George Ray Tweed by Blake Clark
- Robinson Crusoeland, the British alternative title of the 1951 French film Atoll K

== See also ==
- Crusoe (disambiguation)
- Robinsonade, a genre inspired by Robinson Crusoe
- Robinson Crusoe: Adventures on the Cursed Island, a 2012 storytelling cooperative board game
- Lt. Robin Crusoe, U.S.N., a 1966 American film by Byron Paul
