= Media Matters for America =

American media watchdog organization

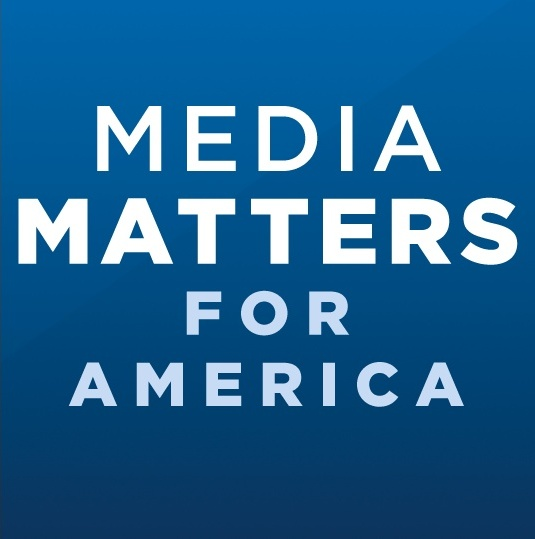

- Screenshot of website, January 4, 2021
- Formation: May 3, 2004; 22 years ago
- Founder: David Brock
- Founded at: Washington, D.C., US
- Type: 501(c)(3) nonprofit
- Tax ID no.: 47-0928008
- Purpose: "Comprehensively monitoring, analyzing, and correcting conservative misinformation in the U.S. media"
- President: Angelo Carusone
- Affiliations: American Bridge 21st Century Super PAC, Media Matters Action Network (501(c)(4))
- Revenue: $21.9 million (2024)
- Expenses: $27.4 million (2024)
- Website: www.mediamatters.org

Media Matters for America (MMfA) is a nonprofit left-leaning and progressive watchdog journalism organization. Founded in 2004 by journalist and political activist David Brock as a counterweight to the conservative Media Research Center, it seeks to spotlight "conservative misinformation" in American media; its methods include issuing reports and quick responses.

Two of its notable initiatives are the "Drop Fox" campaign (2011–2013), which sought to discredit Fox News's claims of producing "fair and balanced" coverage, and a 2023 report about X (formerly Twitter) that highlighted antisemitism on the platform.

== Organization overview ==
=== Founding ===
Media Matters for America was founded in May 2004 by David Brock, a formerly conservative journalist. Brock said that a central goal of the group would be to monitor journalists and outlets for misleading conservative claims and then flag them. He argued that existing conservative-monitoring groups had been doing this and pushing mainstream journalists, the media, and American politics to the right as a result. Brock founded the group with help from the Center for American Progress.

=== Funding ===
In 2004, MMfA began with the help of $2 million in donations. That year, MMfA received the endorsement of the Democracy Alliance, a partnership of wealthy and politically active progressive donors. The Alliance itself does not fund endorsees, but many wealthy Alliance members acted on the endorsement and donated directly to MMfA. In 2010, George Soros donated $1 million to MMfA, citing concern that the "incendiary rhetoric of Fox News hosts may incite violence". In a 2014 CNN interview, David Brock said that Soros's contributions were "less than 10 percent" of Media Matters's budget.

=== Personnel ===
John Podesta, the former chief of staff to President Bill Clinton, provided office space for Media Matters early in its formation at the Center for American Progress, a Democratic think tank Podesta established in 2002. Hillary Clinton advised Media Matters in its early stages out of a belief that progressives should follow conservatives in forming think tanks and advocacy groups to support their political goals. According to The New York Times, Media Matters "helped lay the groundwork" for Hillary Clinton's 2016 presidential campaign.

Media Matters has hired several of the best-known political professionals who have worked for Democratic politicians and progressive groups. In 2004, National Review referred to MMfA staffers who had recently worked on the presidential campaigns of John Edwards and Wesley Clark, for Congressman Barney Frank, and for the Democratic Congressional Campaign Committee. Eric E. Burns served as MMfA's president until 2011. Burns was succeeded by Matt Butler, and then, in 2013, by Bradley Beychok. In late 2016, Angelo Carusone replaced Beychok as MMfA's president. Under Carusone, the organization's focus shifted to the alt-right, conspiracy theories, and fake news.

In 2014, the Media Matters staff voted to join the Service Employees International Union (SEIU). Initially, Media Matters management declined to recognize the union through a card check process, instead exercising its right to force a union election, which delayed the process until July, when the vote favored unionization. In May 2024, a dozen staffers at Media Matters were laid off amid a series of lawsuits and legal investigations by Elon Musk and Republican state attorneys general.

== Initiatives ==
=== Early research ===
Media Matters analyzes American news sources from networks and channels to websites, including NBC, ABC, CBS, PBS, CNN, MSNBC, CNBC, One America News Network, Breitbart, and Fox News, as well as conservative talk radios. Its techniques include content analysis, fact checking, monitoring, and comparison of quotes or presentations from media figures to primary documents, such as United States Department of Defense and Government Accountability Office reports. Since 2006, Media Matters for America has released studies documenting that Republicans and conservatives outnumber Democrats and progressives in guest appearances on television news programs.

On September 12, 2007, Media Matters released a comprehensive study of 1,377 US newspapers and the 201 syndicated political columnists the papers carry on a regular basis. Media Matters wrote, "In paper after paper, state after state, and region after region, conservative syndicated columnists get more space than their progressive counterparts." John Diaz, an editor at the San Francisco Chronicle, cautioned that small-town columnists lean significantly to the right, which he felt could explain the rightward slant in columnists even if the trend does not hold for papers with the largest readership.

=== "Misinformer of the Year" ===
An annual feature on the Media Matters website is the title "Misinformer of the Year", given to the journalist, commentator, or network Media Matters contends was responsible for the most factual errors or claims. Past recipients include Rupert Murdoch, Sean Hannity, Glenn Beck, Mark Zuckerberg, and Steve Bannon.

=== Progressive Talent Initiative ===
The initiative seeks to train mid-career liberal pundits in media skills like TV interviews using four-day bootcamps.

=== Media Matters Action Network ===
In 2010, David Brock established Media Matters Action Network, a 501(c)(4), to track conservative politicians and organizations. In 2009, Media Matters Action Network launched the Conservative Transparency website, aimed at tracking the funding of conservative activist organizations. Media Matters Action Network established the Political Correction project with the goal of holding conservative politicians and advocacy groups accountable.

==== Equality Matters ====
Equality Matters

On December 23, 2010, Media Matters Action Network started Equality Matters, a media and communications initiative in support of LGBT rights in the US. It was described as a "communications war room for gay equality". The site fully incorporated Media Matters's content on LGBTQ issues. Brock set up the project to provide talking points for liberal activists and politicians.

Richard Socarides, a longtime LGBT rights activist and former senior advisor to President Bill Clinton on gay civil rights issues, served as the founding president of Equality Matters, and Kerry Eleveld, journalist for The Advocate, served as editor beginning in 2011. Both announced their departure from the organization in November 2011. Since their departures, Equality Matters has remained active as a mirror site for Media Matters' LGBT content, with a separate Equality Matters blog and podcast by Bradley Herring and Carlos Maza.

The website featured a blog, a fact-checking section, videos, and "Top Picks of the Week", which the organization called its "picks for the most interesting, outrageous, or thought provoking stories of the week." Brock said:

Equality Matters will build on the work done by [Media Matters and Media Matters Action Network]. Through strategic communication, research, training and media monitoring, Equality Matters will strengthen efforts for full LGBT rights and correct anti-gay misinformation. Its goal is to enhance advocacy and activism across all platforms and to leverage expertise in support of others who are working to make full equality a national imperative.

Brock said Equality Matters would "expose right-wing bigotry and homophobia wherever we find it" and "stiffen the spines of progressives." Gay author and activist David Mixner said of the group, "while a range of groups are working to advance gay rights, the movement has lacked a national rapid-response war room of the sort that can push back against homophobic messages in the media and the political arena and keep the pressure on elected officials."

Soon after it launched, Equality Matters faced some criticism about the way it was run. Peter Rosenstein of the Washington Blade wrote, "Over the past couple of months it appears that Equality Matters may have been launched too soon and before its organizers had a real strategy and mission for what they would do."

In 2015, the formal Equality Matters program was deactivated and merged with the LGBTQ program within Media Matters.

=== American Bridge 21st century ===
Brock established American Bridge 21st Century as a super PAC focused on opposition research in 2010.

=== Don Imus ===
On April 4, 2007, Media Matters posted a video clip of Don Imus calling the Rutgers University women's basketball team members "nappy-headed hoes" and made their discovery known in Media Matters' daily e-mailing to hundreds of journalists. According to The Wall Street Journal, top news outlets did not mention the incident until objections made to CBS Radio by the National Association of Black Journalists led to an on-air apology from Imus. MSNBC, calling Imus's comments "racist" and "abhorrent", suspended Imus's show, and within minutes, CBS suspended the show. The Wall Street Journal said Imus's apology "seemed to make matters worse, with critics latching on to Mr. Imus's use of the phrase 'you people.'" Among those dissatisfied with Imus's apology and suspension were the Rutgers team's coach and a group of MSNBC African-American employees. After Procter & Gamble pulled advertising from all of MSNBC's daytime schedule, and other advertisers, including General Motors and American Express, requested that CBS cancel any upcoming advertising they had bought for Imus in the Morning, MSNBC and CBS dropped Imus's show.

=== Rush Limbaugh "phony soldiers" ===
In September 2007, Media Matters reported that conservative radio talk show host Rush Limbaugh had called Iraq War veterans opposed to the war "phony soldiers". Limbaugh later said he was speaking of only one soldier, Jesse Macbeth, who had falsely claimed to have been decorated for valor but had never seen combat. Limbaugh said he was the victim of a "smear" by Media Matters, which had taken his comments out of context and selectively edited them. After Limbaugh published what he said was the entire transcript of the "phony soldiers" discussion, Media Matters reported that over 90 seconds was omitted without "notation or ellipsis to indicate that there is, in fact, a break in the transcript". Limbaugh told National Review that the gap between referring to "phony soldiers" and MacBeth was a delay because his staff printed out an ABC news story that reported on what it called "phony soldiers" and that his transcript and audio edits were "for space and relevance reasons, not to hide anything". The Associated Press, CNN, and ABC reported on the controversy, as political satirist and fictional pundit Stephen Colbert lampooned Limbaugh and his defenders saying: "Hey, Media Matters, you want to end offensive speech? Then stop recording it for people who would be offended."

=== Bill O'Reilly Harlem restaurant ===
In October 2007 television and radio host and commentator Bill O'Reilly said a Media Matters headline declaring "O'Reilly surprised 'there was no difference' between Harlem restaurant and other New York City restaurants" took out of context comments he made about a pleasant dinner he shared with Al Sharpton at a Harlem restaurant. O'Reilly said Media Matters misleadingly took comments spoken five minutes apart and presented them as one. On NBC's Today, Media Matters senior fellow Paul Waldman said Media Matters had included "the full audio, the full transcript, nothing was taken out of context".

=== Laura Schlessinger racial slur ===
On August 12, 2010, Media Matters reported that radio host Laura Schlessinger said the word "nigger" eleven times during a discussion with an African-American woman, though not as a slur. Schlessinger continued to use the word after the caller took offense, saying she thought the woman was being too sensitive and that a double standard was being applied to who could say the word. Schlessinger also said that those "hypersensitive" about color should not "marry outside of their race". The caller had earlier in the discussion said her husband was white.

Schlessinger apologized for the epithet the day after the broadcast. A joint statement by Media Matters and other organizations noted that although Schlessinger "attempted to apologize for using the epithet, the racist diatribe on Tuesday's show extends far beyond the use of a single word" and urged advertisers to boycott her show. After General Motors, OnStar, and Motel 6 pulled their advertising, Schlessinger said she would not renew her syndication contract set to expire in December 2010. In January 2011, her show resumed on satellite radio. Schlessinger held Media Matters responsible for the boycott, which she called a typical tactic of the group aimed at fulfilling its "sole purpose of silencing people". She said the boycott's "threat of attack on my advertisers and stations" had violated her First Amendment free speech rights. Media Matters said that, as the boycott was not "government-sanctioned censorship", her First Amendment rights had not been violated.

=== "Drop Fox" campaign ===
During an interview in March 2011, Brock said MMfA would focus its efforts on Fox News and select conservative websites in a new strategy that Brock described as a campaign of "guerrilla warfare and sabotage" and a "war on Fox." MMfA said the greater attention given to Fox News was part of an initiative to educate the public about what it regarded as the distortions of conservative media, and the greater attention given to Fox News was in line with its prominence. MMfA said its Drop Fox initiative, for advertisers to boycott Fox, was also part of the organization's educational mission. MMfA said that changing Fox, not shutting it down, was its intention.

One target, Orbitz, initially called Media Matters' efforts a "smear campaign", but on June 9, 2011, after a three-week effort by prominent LGBTQ organizations, it agreed to "review the policies and process used to evaluate where advertising is placed".

In December 2013, MMfA's then-Executive Vice President Angelo Carusone said "The war on Fox is over. And it's not just that it's over, but it was very successful. To a large extent, we won," claiming to have "effectively discredited the network's desire to be seen as 'fair and balanced.'" Around that time, Glenn Beck had left the network, and Sean Hannity's time slot was moved from 9 p.m. to 10 p.m. Other boycotts of cable news programs continued after the campaign, with PolitiFact suggesting that the boycotts are more successful in raising awareness than having an impact on the companies' bottom line.

=== Tucker Carlson audio recordings ===
In March 2019, MMfA released audio recordings of Fox News host Tucker Carlson in which he made remarks demeaning to women between 2006 and 2011 on the call-in show hosted by shock jock Bubba the Love Sponge. Among other comments, Carlson called rape shield laws "unfair", defended Mormon fundamentalist church leader Warren Jeffs, who had been charged with child sexual assault, and called women "extremely primitive". After his remarks had been widely reported, Carlson tweeted: "Media Matters caught me saying something naughty on a radio show more than a decade ago" and declined to apologize. The following day, MMfA released a second set of audio recordings in which Carlson called Iraqis "semiliterate primitive monkeys" and said they "don't use toilet paper or forks." Carlson also suggested that immigrants to the U.S. should be "hot" or "really smart" and that white men "created civilization". The Daily Caller, which Carlson co-founded, responded by resurfacing blog posts made by Carusone. The posts included derogatory comments about transvestites, Jews, and people from Japan and Bangladesh. Carusone responded that the posts were supposed to be a "caricature of what a right wing blowhard would sound like if he was living my life" and apologized for the "gross" remarks.

=== Misinformation on social media ===
Media Matters analyzed Donald Trump's Facebook posts from 2020 and early 2021 and flagged 1/4 of them as containing misinformation or extremist rhetoric.

=== Antisemitism on X (formerly Twitter) ===
In November 2023, Media Matters published an analysis indicating that advertisements of major firms such as IBM were being displayed on the social media platform X (formerly Twitter) next to user posts containing antisemitic content, including praise for Adolf Hitler and Nazis. Several prominent companies suspended their advertising on the platform in reaction to the study and to some of Musk's recent posts.

== Lawsuit and state investigations ==
On November 20, 2023, X Corp. owner Elon Musk filed suit in a Texas court alleging Media Matters defamed the platform with the intention of hurting its advertising revenues. According to the lawsuit, Media Matters had "manufactured side-by-side images depicting advertisers' posts on X Corp's social media platform beside Neo-Nazi and white-nationalist fringe content", falsely portraying the juxtaposition as a routine occurrence on X. Media Matters called the complaint frivolous and an attempt to silence their reporting. Legal experts criticized Musk's lawsuit as "frivolous" or "bogus" and said it contradicts the First Amendment. Judge Reed O'Connor, as of October 2024, has refused calls by some legal experts to recuse himself from the case for owning Tesla stock, disputing that the ruling would significantly impact Tesla's share price. X has been described as judge shopping by seeking to settle all litigation in O'Connor's district.

On the same day that the X lawsuit was filed, Texas Attorney General Ken Paxton opened an investigation into Media Matters for "potentially fraudulent activity", saying his goal was "to ensure that the public has not been deceived by the schemes of radical left-wing organizations". He also urged other state attorneys general to investigate the group. Media Matters sued Paxton in federal court days later, alleging he had violated the First Amendment to chill the group's work and engaged in unlawful retaliation to punish the group. In April 2024, Judge Amit Mehta issued a preliminary injunction against Paxton's demand for internal documents from the group.

In December 2023, Missouri Attorney General Andrew Bailey opened a similar investigation into Media Matters. In August 2024, a federal judge granted an injunction to halt the Missouri investigation, saying the suit was "using law enforcement machinery for political ends" against Media Matters, running contrary to the organization's First Amendment rights. In June 2025, Media Matters sued the Federal Trade Commission, alleging that the FTC's ongoing investigation into Media Matters was in retaliation for its scrutiny of Trump administration allies, including X Corp., and that the investigation violated Media Matters' First Amendment rights. In July 2025, The New York Times reported that Media Matters was "under siege by Trump and Musk" as part of their retribution campaign. Having trouble paying legal fees, it scaled back criticism, reduced staff, and contemplated closing entirely.

In April 2026, the FTC dropped its investigation into Media Matters. In May, Media Matters withdrew its suit against the FTC.

=== International lawsuits ===
Musk also pursued lawsuits against Media Matters internationally for lost advertising revenue worldwide. In December 2023, a lawsuit was filed in Ireland and in July 2024, Singapore. The Singapore subsidiary collects advertising revenue in the Asia Pacific region. Media Matters sought to stay the lawsuit on grounds that Singapore was not the right jurisdiction due to the multiplicity of the cases in Ireland, Singapore, and the United States, while the Singapore subsidiary contended that it had no other lawsuit with Media Matters and that the different entities were filing for their own specific damages. The High Court stayed the Singapore case in June 2026 and indicated that the US would be the appropriate location for the matter to be heard.

== Reception ==
Columnists and writers such as Paul Krugman and Molly Ivins cited Media Matters or identified it as a helpful source. In 2008, columnist Jacques Steinberg of The New York Times said David Folkenflik of National Public Radio had told him that although Media Matters has a partisan slant it was still a useful source for leads, partly due to its broad research. Steinberg said the right already had similar outlets looking for stories and feeding them to reporters, and that Media Matters has effectively filled a void on the left. He notes that some journalists like Stuart Rothenberg prefer nonpartisan sources. A 2010 opinion piece by "M. S." on The Economist magazine's blog argued that it carries no weight with conservatives because it mostly critiques conservative outlets. Some object to the organization fact-checking conservative commentators more than liberal ones. Some also criticized Media Matters as too supportive of Hillary Clinton before and during her 2016 presidential campaign.

== See also ==
- Journalism ethics and standards
- Media bias (in the United States)
- Media monitoring service
  - Accuracy in Media
  - Fairness & Accuracy in Reporting
  - Glasgow Media Group
  - People for the American Way
  - Project Censored
