= Paolo Carosone =

Italian painter (born 1941)

Paolo Carosone (born 8 January 1941 in Rome, Italy) is an Italian painter, sculptor, etcher and multimedia artist.

== Biography ==
Paolo Carosone lived in Rome until 1960, when he left for Amsterdam to study drawing and sculpture at the Instituut voor Kunstnijverheidsonderwijs until 1962. To pay for his studies, he made plaster statues in a workshop of religious articles and became a guide at the International Flower Market in Aalsmeer, Netherlands, where he became deeply interested in botany.

In 1962 he moved to Copenhagen, Denmark to study etching with Professor Holger Jensen at Royal Danish Academy of Fine Arts, where he received two annual scholarships from the Danish Government. He remained in Copenhagen until 1966. During his stay at the academy he developed a strong interest in the natural sciences (specifically, in entomology) and in music. He produced his first "sound bas-reliefs": sculptures that could be "played" by the public through various mechanisms.

The Gammel Strand Gallery in Copenhagen organized the first major exhibition of his work. In 1965, the Museum of Modern Art of New York and the Philadelphia Museum of Art bought several of his works. The American Art Gallery in Copenhagen also represented his works worldwide. In Italy, the first major exhibition of his graphic work was displayed at the Calcografia Nazionale in Rome, then headed by Maurizio Calvesi.

From 1966 to 1970 he lived in Japan, where he studied ukiyo-e woodblock printmaking. He was introduced by Professor T. Ono at the Tokyo University of the Arts (Tokyo Geijutsu Daigaku) to workshops focusing on lacquerware, Nihonga painters, calligraphy masters and katana craftsmen. With the support of the Minami Gallery in Tokyo and the help of four computer engineers, he designed and constructed the ”Winged Organ to play music by brain waves”; a highly sophisticated audio-kinetic sculpture which turned the waves of the human brain, the heartbeat, the breathing, the body temperature and the blood pressure into electronic sound.

Shimizu Kusuo, who owns the gallery, introduced him to the composer Toru Takemitsu, who later devoted to him a whole chapter of his book Oto to Chinmoku to Hakari aeru hodo ni ("Confronting sound and silence"). In 1970 he left Japan and arrived in Los Angeles on board the cargo ship Rose as the only passenger, with his numerous sculptures and projects.

In Santa Monica, he stayed with the painter Sam Francis, who introduced him to the artistic scene in Los Angeles. He turned a former pet shop near Santa Monica Beach into his laboratory-workshop. He began work on a series of kinetic sculptures inspired by 1930 California-architecture, titled “Monuments to the Automata”.

He worked for two months on the making a multi-screen film called “Do not polish the brass”, which shows the origin and inspiration of his images. Sponsored by the Italian Cultural Institute of Belgrade in Yugoslavia, he exhibited a set of etchings inspired by old medical images at the Graficki Kolectiv gallery. He gave a talk entitled “Man as a parasite of the universe” at the “Dom Omladine” cultural center where his film “Do not polish the brass” is also shown. The same exhibition traveled to the “Maison de l’Art” in Beirut.

In 1972 he returned to Los Angeles, where an exhibition dedicated to his work at the “Esther-Robles Gallery” was greatly successful. He gave a series of lectures at the “Los Angeles County Museum”, the ”Pasadena Museum of Art”, the “Otis Art Institute” and the “San Francisco Museum of Art” entitled "The heterogeneous composition of my poetic world".

Back in Europe, he worked in Rome for four months on a new series of etchings called “Love Wounds”, neo-classical figures covered with gauze and bandages. He returned to California, where he taught etchings for two years at the University of California, Berkeley, where he had access to the various laboratories of the science departments and conducted experiments on the flow of sands and colored crystals through tubes filled with rare gases.

In 1974, after exhibiting his works at the “Gallery Allen” in Vancouver, returned to Rome where he started working on a series of etchings titled “Impressed Images” that exploit the double meaning of “impressed”, as “impressed in memory” or “impressed on paper”. This series was a trip through nostalgia. Back in the United States, he began a new series of sculptures in epoxy resin which he called “Herobots”, a term coined by the fusion of “Hero” and “Robot”.

In 1980 he exhibited at the “Temple Gallery” in Rome a visionary reconstruction (on a 1:16 scale) of the obelisk of Piazza del Popolo re-arranged in neoclassical style by the architect Giuseppe Valadier. The piece was produced by introducing computer-made sculpture elements. Pushed by his growing interest in the transcription systems of world languages, he produced, through computer elaboration, a series of “Technological Hieroglyphs” in epoxy resin.

He became a visiting lecturer, and then an assistant professor at Temple University Tyler School of Art in Rome, where he teaches sculpture until 1988. In 1981 at the “Lerici Foundation” in Stockholm he inaugurated a travelling exhibition through major European cities titled ”Plastica Visionaria” The director of the Zoological Museum in Rome hosted him and his students in the Department of Taxidermy. Free access to the exhibited pieces represented a major source of inspiration, which would result in many drawings, photographs, models, plaster casts of animals and bone structures, leading eventually to the “Museum of Unnatural History”, a series of boxes containing Insects and other “Mechanical Animals”.

NASA invited him to participate in the “NASA Fine Art Program” with the task of documenting through his work the launch of the Space Shuttle Challenger at the Kennedy Space Center of Cape Canaveral. He was therefore present – drawing details of the launch platform and the shuttle – at the unfortunate launch of 1986 where the Challenger was destroyed. He then created for the NASA Art Museum a 6-meter-high obelisk in epoxy resin to commemorate the Space Shuttle “Challenger”.

The names of the seven astronauts who lost their lives in the disaster are written on the obelisk, using a “Three-Dimensional Universal Language Transcription System”, a hieroglyphic code capable of rationally transcribing every human language by coding the minimal articulatory constituents of their sounds. This system is developed in collaboration with Francesco Antinucci, research director at the Institute of Cognitive Science of the Consiglio Nazionale delle Ricerche (C.N.R.) of Rome.

Throughout the 1990s he continued experimenting on the “photo-milling process” making sculptures and bas-reliefs out of stainless steel, phosphorus bronze, aluminum and brass and also working on the Robotic Myths sculptures - they are idealized portraits from the ancient classics with robotic elements. He also started a cycle of "Mechanical Sculptures" inspired by the marine world. The subjects are mostly crabs, crawfishes, rays and shells and also sea birds. He also makes some moulds of a large "Limulus Poliphemus" (an Arthropod from the Lower Triassic) which are then transformed into helmets, ships and war machines.

He painted a series of zoological and botanical plates, originated from a fusion of the vegetable and the animal world, continuing the project started in 1980 with the "Museum of Unnatural History". Many of these images are translated into sculptural models manually or by the process of "rapid prototyping" used in industry.

== Museums and public collections ==
- The Museum of Modern Art. New York, U.S.
- National Gallery of Art. Washington, D.C., U.S.
- The Philadelphia Museum of Art. Philadelphia, U.S.
- University Art Museum. Berkeley, U.S.
- National Medical Museum. Bethesda, U.S.
- The NASA Art Museum. John F. Kennedy Space Center. Cape Canaveral, Florida, U.S.
- Yale University Art Gallery. New Haven, Connecticut, U.S.
- Galleria Nazionale d'Arte Moderna. Rome, Italy.
- Istituto Nazionale per la Grafica. Rome, Italy.
- Pinacoteca Nazionale. Bologna, Italy.
- Statens Museum for Kunst. Copenhagen, Denmark.
- Musik Konservatorium. Copenhagen, Denmark.
- Royal Danish Academy of Fine Arts. Charlottenborg, Copenhagen, Denmark.
- Hellerup Kunstforening. Hellerup, Denmark.
- Haderslev Kunst Museum. Haderslev, Denmark.

== Bibliography ==
- Toru Takemitsu. Oto to Chinmoku to Hakari aeru hodo ni (Confronting sound and silence). Shinchosha. Tokyo, 1971.
- Masuo Ikeda. “The Dionysiac and Apollonian world of Paolo Carosone” .Politaia. Tokyo, 1969.
- Paolo Carosone. Metamorfosi di un moschettiere. "Hvedekorn" Tidsskrift for litteratur og grafik. Copenhaghen, 1964.
- Paolo Carosone. “Watashi o Nihon e hakonda Kaze”. (The wind which brought me to Japan). Geijutsu Seikatsu, (Artistic Life) Tokyo, 1969.
- Paolo Carosone. “Italian Concert for brain waves”. Politaia. Tokyo, 1970
