= Lewis Crusoe =

Automobile executive

Lewis D. Crusoe was an automobile executive for Ford Motor Company in the 1950s.

Crusoe had been an executive for General Motors, and was recruited to come to Ford by Ernie Breech, a GM executive brought in by Henry Ford II. He became the vice-president in charge of Ford Division, then the head of the Car and Truck Divisions.

He was the primary inspiration for the introduction of the original Ford Thunderbird, along with designer George W. Walker Inspiration for the Ford Thunderbird came when Crusoe and Walker were viewing European car models at the Grand Palais car show in Paris.

Crusoe died on November 25, 1973, at the age of 78.

- TBird retrospective
