= Paul Caruso (lawyer) =

American lawyer

Paul Caruso (1920–2001) was a criminal defense attorney in Los Angeles, California. He served in the United States Marine Corps during World War II.

== Legal career ==
Paul Caruso was admitted to practice law in August 1953 following graduation from the Columbus University School of Law in Washington DC (now the Columbus School of Law of the Catholic University of America). He obtained a veteran's waiver for admission to the California Bar.

Caruso later represented war hero and actor Audie Murphy on a charge of trying to kill a Burbank dog trainer who Murphy claimed brutalized the dog and made advances towards Murphy's girlfriend. Caruso has also represented Charles Manson follower Susan Atkins, Eddie Nash—who was accused of four Laurel Canyon slayings—and TV sports reporter Stan Duke, who was charged in the gunshot slaying of radio commentator Averill Berman.

Caruso was the founding president of the Italian American Lawyers Assn. in Los Angeles.

Caruso had five children, and his eldest son, Carey Caruso, still runs his father's practice.
