= Angelo Carusone =

American author, president of Media Matters for America

Angelo Carusone (born May 16, 1982) is an American author and nonprofit executive. He is the president of Media Matters for America, a nonprofit media watchdog. He has led political and progressive initiatives like Dump Trump and StopBeck campaigns.

== Early life and education ==
Carusone was born on May 16, 1982. His father was a sewer and drain cleaner while his mother was a part-time lunch lady. He graduated from Chaminade High School in Mineola, New York in 2000. He graduated with a Bachelor's degree in philosophy at Fordham University in the Bronx, New York in 2004. In 2010, he obtained his Juris Doctor degree from the University of Wisconsin Law School in Madison.

== Career ==
Carusone gained attention in American politics for his initiatives targeting right-wing personalities whom he considers "bullies". The activities, which he says is "brand safety", include efforts helping drive advertisers away from the shows of Glenn Beck, who eventually lost his Fox News show, and Rush Limbaugh. Carusone is said to have played a role in hastening the departure of Bill O'Reilly from Fox. In 2012, Carusone also initiated the Dump Trump campaign. The initiative called on retailers to discontinue selling Trump-branded products. Trump threatened him with a $25 million lawsuit.

In 2016, Carusone served as the Deputy CEO of the Finance and Administration of the Democratic National Convention. In December 2016 he was promoted to president of Media Matters, having served as its executive vice president. He succeeded the organization’s founder David Brock. When Carusone assumed the position, he said that Media Matters would shift the focus of its scrutiny from the conservative media to "alt-right" websites, alleged "fake news", and "misinformation". He has unmasked, for example, U.S. news outlets that are associated with Falun Gong, a Chinese new religious movement.

Carusone has been critical of Elon Musk's 2022 takeover of Twitter. Carusone alleges Musk will allow the social media platform to become a source of hate speech, instead of reasonable controls on information. Carusone has called on major advertisers to pull funding from Twitter if Musk continues with his supposed planned "radicalization".

== Personal life ==
Carusone is married to Brett Abrams. He lives on Long Island, New York.
