= Luciano Caruso (composer) =

Italian jazz composer and saxophonist

- Born: 19 July 1957 (age 69); Turin, Italy
- Origin: Vittorio Veneto
- Genres: Jazz
- Occupations: Composer, musician
- Instrument: Soprano saxophone
- Member of: Phophonix Orchestra
- Website: digilander.libero.it/carujazz/index.htm

Luciano Caruso (born 19 July 1957, in Turin, Italy) is an Italian Jazz composer and Soprano saxophone performer.

In 1973, he moved to Vittorio Veneto to attend the music institute "Toti Dal Monte" in Pieve di Soligo and afterwards the school "Dizzy Gillespie" in Bassano del Grappa. He attended several workshops with Renato Geremia (1977), Gary Burton (1984) and Steve Lacy(1994).

He has played with musicians such as Eddi Busnello, Nello Da Pont, Giovanni Maier, Gianluigi Trovesi, Carlo Actis Dato, Giorgio Pacorig, Daniele Cavallanti, Michele Rabbia, Massimo De Mattia, Daniele Dagaro, Achille Succi, Ermes Ghirardini, Lauro Rossi, Romano Todesco, and U.T.Gandhi.

In 1992, along with drummer Nello Da Pont, he started "Progetto Exit". A school of jazz and experimental music based in Vittorio Veneto. He is the director of "Banda comunale della Città di Vittorio Veneto" and a member of "Phophonix Orchestra".
