= Anthony Caruso (entrepreneur) =

Anthony Caruso is an American business executive who is the president and chief executive officer of CSA Group, a distribution management and logistics company. CSA partners with fulfillment and logistics providers, using negotiations to offer customers discounts on shipping. CSA Group's clients include Amnesty International, Marriott and Samsung America.

Before founding CSA Group, he held various sales and sales management positions at FedEx Corporation. As a Global Sales Executive, Anthony led his team to closing the largest international express freight deal in FedEx history. For his efforts he was named “Global Account Manager of the Year”. He has also worked with political leaders including Tennessee Senator Fred Thompson to help the state and local government create stronger alliances with the private sector.

He is an active speaker. He lives in southern New Jersey with his three children. He was inspired to start his own business when his first child was born. He is involved with several charities including the American Red Cross and United Way.
