= John Cruso =

John Cruso (1592/3 – after 1650) was a writer on military matters before the English Civil War, and a supporter of the Parliamentary cause during the war.

Many of his works were as editor and a translator of continental works. Ole Peter Grell says "Cruso's military works were significant only in that they were the first to make the new continental, primarily Dutch, military literature available to an English-speaking audience." Cruso also wrote poetry in English and Dutch. His Dutch poems include a lengthy reflection on Psalm 8, and an elegy to the minister of the Dutch church in Norwich, Johannes Elison (1642). In 1655 he published a collection of 221 Dutch epigrams. We also know of at least three English poems by Cruso, dedicated to the preacher at St. Andrew's church, Norwich, Lawrence Howlett. Cruso was also an elder of the Dutch church in Norwich and made a living as a cloth merchant.

== Bibliography ==
- Militarie Instructions for the Cavallrie (1632)
- The Complete Captain and A Treatise of Modern War
- A Short Method for the Easie Resolving of any Militarie Question
- The Art of Warre (Cambridge 1639)
- A Short Method—the second part of The Art of Warre,(1639)
- Castrametation, or, The measuring out of the quarters for the encamping of an army (1642)
