= List of Two Guys and a Girl episodes =

The television show Two Guys, a Girl and a Pizza Place (retitled Two Guys and a Girl in its third season) began as a short-run (13 episodes) mid-season replacement on March 11, 1998, following two pizza delivery boys, Pete Dunville (Richard Ruccolo) and Michael "Berg" Bergen (Ryan Reynolds). They are close friends with the feisty Sharon Carter (Traylor Howard), the spokesperson of Immaculate Chemicals. The show aired on Wednesday nights for most of its run until it was moved to the Friday night death slot to start its fourth season, in 2000. This resulted in a steep drop in ratings and the plug was pulled. The series finale was titled "The Internet Show," an episode where fans of the show could go online and vote for the outcome. In the end, they chose to have Ashley become pregnant with Pete's child, as opposed to either of the other two female characters, or nobody, becoming pregnant. Revelation Films released the complete series on region 2 DVD in the UK, 24 June 2013.

== Series overview ==
Season	Episodes	Originally released	
Season	Episodes	First released	Last released
1	13	March 11, 1998	July 22, 1998
2	22	September 23, 1998	May 26, 1999
3	24	September 22, 1999	May 17, 2000
4	22	October 4, 2000	May 16, 2001

== Episodes ==
=== Season 1 (1998) ===
No. overall	No. in season	Title	Directed by	Written by	Original release date	Prod. code	Viewers (millions)
1	1	"The Pilot"	James Widdoes	Rick Wiener & Kenny Schwartz & Danny Jacobson	March 11, 1998	5Z79	17.94
Pete tells Berg and Sharon that he is going to break up with his girlfriend Melissa because he doesn't think "she's the one" but he then decides not to. When Melissa jokingly asks Berg "What have you done to my Pete?" unaware that Pete changed his mind, Berg says,"Hey, I told him not to break up with you." Melissa, getting angry breaks up with Pete. Berg tries to fix it, but as a result of taking part in some medical experiments can only tell the truth and ends up making things worse.
2	2	"Two Guys, a Girl and a Presentation"	Mark Cendrowski	Vince Calandra	March 18, 1998	5Z09	13.09
When Berg is accepted to med-school, Pete becomes irritated as suddenly everyone is taking Berg's advice instead of his. His frustration grows when Bill lets Berg take the rest of the shift off over Pete, despite Pete needing to prepare for his big presentation in front of the museum board later that night. When rushing out to the presentation, Berg thinks Pete accidentally swallowed an overdose of an analgesic mixed in with some orange juice. But Berg himself actually drank the orange juice with the analgesic, and starts to show symptoms at Pete's presentation.
3	3	"Two Guys, a Girl and a Guy"	John Fortenberry	Mark Ganzel	March 25, 1998	5Z04	14.83
When Sharon starts a new relationship, Pete and Berg realise how much they rely on her. They notice a change in her behaviour and become jealous when she starts spending more time with her boyfriend than with them. Wanting to go back to how things used to be, they invite Ted on a guys' night out, hoping to find something out about him that they could use to sabotage the relationship. Berg becomes very attracted to the latest product he is testing for money; a pair of talking sneakers that help train people for marathons by calling out encouraging comments. Meanwhile, at the pizza place, Mr. Bauer is convinced that Bill is a 'pod person'.
4	4	"Two Guys, a Girl and a Celtic Game"	John Fortenberry	Michelle Milzow	April 1, 1998	5Z03	12.62
Pete, a Boston Celtics fanatic, is jealous when Berg, who would have rather been at home watching TV, is the lucky ticket holder at a Celtics game and gets to sit on the bench beside Pete's favorite player. To cheer Pete up, Berg steals the Celtics 1981 Championship Banner for their apartment, unaware of the outrage and media frenzy it will cause.
5	5	"Two Guys, a Girl and an Apartment"	Marjorie Weitzman	Liz Sagal & Paige Bernhardt	April 8, 1998	5Z06	14.18
Berg and Sharon make it their business to interview possible future tenants when a vacancy opens up in their building. Pete tries to figure out what to get Melissa for their one-year anniversary, and Berg has a severe emotional reaction to his latest experimental product.
6	6	"Two Guys, a Girl and a Softball Team"	Rich Correll	Mark Ganzel & Vince Calandra & Barry Wernick	April 15, 1998	1ABZ10	11.75
Berg and Pete start a co-ed baseball team in order to meet more women. Bill, being their sponsor is led to believe that team is actually good and challenges one of his competitors to a game.
7	7	"Two Guys, a Girl and a Recovery"	Marjorie Weitzman	Danny Jacobson	April 22, 1998	5Z07	10.66
Berg sets Pete up with a patient at the hospital called Lauren (Rena Sofer) in an effort to get Pete over his recent breakup with Melissa. It's only when Pete starts to really like her and starts calling her "The One" that Berg finds out she may not have long to live and has to figure out how to break the news to Pete.
8	8	"Two Guys, a Girl and a Party"	John Fortenberry	Rick Wiener	April 29, 1998	5Z01	10.92
Looking for an excuse to spend more time with a girl he has had a crush on for years, Berg invites her to a party for Pete's 30th birthday, ignoring the fact that Pete is 24 and his birthday is months away. Sharon cleans the boys' apartment to vent her frustration at a guy she really likes not calling her back. When he does call, Berg and Pete decide not to tell her until after she has finished cleaning their apartment. Naturally they forget to...
9	9	"Two Guys, a Girl and a Chance Encounter"	Gordon Hunt	Kenny Schwartz & Rick Wiener	May 6, 1998	1ABZ11	10.52
When Sharon is flicking through the 'Chance Encounter' Ads, she notices one that could be Pete and so she and Berg decide to set up a meeting between them for their own entertainment. They are disappointed when she turns out to be a nice, pretty girl who Pete likes and starts to date, but she soon makes it clear she won't let anyone come between them, threatening Berg with a baseball bat in the middle of the night. When they realize how unbalanced she is, Pete wants to break up with her, but is too afraid to.
10	10	"Two Guys, a Girl and a Pizza Delivery"	Brian K. Roberts	Kenny Schwartz	May 20, 1998	5Z02	9.64
Berg gets suspicious of Pete when he always wants to deliver the pizza to 845 Arlington. So Berg makes the delivery for a change and discovers that it's a gorgeous artist (Carmen Electra) who paints with her nude body that's been making the orders. This leads Berg and Sharon to believe that Pete is cheating on Melissa with her.
11	11	"Two Guys, a Girl and How They Met"	Margorie Weitzman	Rick Wiener & Kenny Schwartz & Danny Jacobson	May 26, 1998	1ABZ12	11.34
When Bill asks if Berg or Pete were ever romantically interested in Sharon, they tell the story of how they met her. Back when they were freshmen they met Sharon in O'Malley's during 'Bladder Bust' when beer is free until somebody pees or flees. Both wanting to ask her out, they distract her from getting to the toilet before Bladder Burst begins and so have to find a way to get her out without Bladder Burst ending.
12	12	"Two Guys, a Girl and a Dad"	Rich Correll	Barry Wernick	July 15, 1998	5Z08	7.79
Pete is trusted to keep the fact that Berg's dad (Howard Hesseman) has quit his law firm to become a caricaturist in the park from Berg and that Berg is no longer in law school from Berg's father. Pete is highly irritated by all this and so tries to get the two to talk to each other. Sharon continues to hate her job.
13	13	"Two Guys, a Girl and a Landlord"	John Fortenberry	Vince Calandra	July 22, 1998	5Z05	7.95
Pete and Sharon fight back against their landlord (Harve Presnell) when he goes over the edge with the rules for living in the building. Berg thinks they are being childish until the landlord removes all the windows from their apartment to teach Pete a lesson and it causes Berg's pet fish to die. It's war.

=== Season 2 (1998–99) ===
No. overall	No. in season	Title	Directed by	Written by	Original release date	Prod. code	Viewers (millions)
14	1	"Two Guys, a Girl and Someone Better"	Michael Lembeck	Kevin Abbott	September 23, 1998	2ABZ02	12.83
When Berg notices he is no longer first in his class he goes out to find who is so he can psych them out. He finds out it's a beautiful female co-ed, Ashley, so he invites her out the night before a big test with the aim of getting her drunk so she will not be able to study. Little does he know that he has finally met his match.
15	2	"Two Guys, a Girl and a Vacation"	Michael Lembeck	Rick Wiener	September 30, 1998	2ABZ01	12.08
Sharon decides to quit her job but her boss does not want her to and tells her to think it over in Aruba with her friends. They are all looking forward to the trip but they risk missing their flight when Pete has to go to a job interview, Sharon has to hold a press conference and the hospital beep Berg to come into work. Determined to make it, they come up with various schemes to cut these activities short, but will it be enough?
16	3	"Two Guys, a Girl and a Tattoo"	John Fortenberry	Mark Ganzel	October 7, 1998	2ABZ03	12.01
Sharon and Berg are annoyed when Pete will not let them meet his new girlfriend because he fears they would point out something wrong with her that he would fixate on. When they decide to crash Pete's date with her, Berg realizes he had a one night stand with her years ago and that she had Berg's name tattooed on her butt. Berg is then on a mission to see if it is still there.
17	4	"Two Guys, a Girl and an Elective"	John Fortenberry	Kenny Schwartz	October 21, 1998	2ABZ04	12.44
Pete has to choose an elective course. He chooses metallurgy but when Berg leaves his course choice card in he changes it for a course in sports broadcasting because he thinks Pete needs to loosen up. At first Pete's mad but soon learns to enjoy it and considers making it his new career. Also Sharon flirts with the jukebox repairman Johnny, telling Berg that she keeps breaking it, just so Johnny will come back to the pizza place every time.
18	5	"Two Guys, a Girl and a Homecoming"	Michael Lembeck	Story by : Mark Ganzel; Teleplay by : Rick Wiener & Kenny Schwartz	October 14, 1998	2ABZ06	13.52
It's homecoming and Pete and Berg plan to get luxury box seats to the homecoming game to upstage some old college friends. The trouble is they neither have the money nor the means but they do have plenty of creative schemes. Sharon is looking forward to seeing her old friends so she can gloat about her new boyfriend Johnny. However, when they ask her what he does, she panics and tells them Johnny is a music executive. This causes problems as Johnny thinks she is embarrassed by him. But has Johnny told his friends the truth about what she does?
19	6	"Two Guys, a Girl and a Psycho Halloween"	Michael Lembeck	Stevie Ray Fromstein	October 28, 1998	2ABZ05	13.67
It's Halloween in this surreal episode and Berg is working late in the hospital when Psycho Berg appears, ties him up and goes on a murderous rampage. Pete and Sharon are throwing a costume party, unaware that it is Psycho Berg with them. When they find the real Berg, they try to protect themselves from the killer by locking themselves into the pizza place. After a mix-up, they must decide which one is the real Berg and which one is the killer.
20	7	"Two Guys, a Girl and an Internship"	Marjorie Weitzman	Vince Calandra	November 4, 1998	2ABZ07	13.61
Berg convinces Ashley to get her father to give Pete an internship. Pete's first day at work becomes interesting when he has sex with a girl on top of the photocopier. He later finds out that the girl is his bosses daughter and also Ashley's sister. Berg worries that if Ashley finds out it will affect her opinion of him and tries to get Pete to end things.
21	8	"Two Guys, a Girl and a Wedding"	Marjorie Weitzman	Liz Sagal & Paige Bernhardt	November 11, 1998	2ABZ08	13.54
One of Berg, Pete and Sharon's college friends is getting married and they are all invited. Pete takes it badly because the bride is his ex-girlfriend and he convinces himself that she was 'The One.' Sharon is bringing Johnny to the wedding as her date but is afraid he will not be attracted to her anymore after he sees her in the hideous bridesmaid dress. Berg brings Ashley to the wedding as a friend but uses another girl to make her jealous. It works and Ashley breaks down and admits her feelings for Berg, but also drops a bombshell.
22	9	"Two Guys, a Girl and Oxford"	Ellen Gittelsohn	Story by : Stevie Ray Fromstein; Teleplay by : Vince Calandra & Barry Wernick	November 18, 1998	2ABZ09	11.34
After her announcement that she has feelings for Berg but has a long term boyfriend, Ashley is avoiding Berg. When Berg finally tracks her down they kiss for the first time. Sharon insists he goes to talk to her again but when he does, her roommate tells him she went to Oxford to see her boyfriend. He decides to follow her to Oxford. Meanwhile, Pete and Johnny get jobs as limo drivers and Pete uses the job to charm and dance with old rich ladies who tip him well.
23	10	"Two Guys, a Girl and a Thanksgiving"	Marjorie Weitzman	Story by : Kenny Schwartz; Teleplay by : Mark Ganzel & Barry Wernick	November 25, 1998	2ABZ10	11.51
Sharon and Johnny want to start a new Thanksgiving tradition and be alone. But plans change when Pete's grandpa (Dick Martin) comes down unannounced and Berg invites Ashley and her boyfriend Justin. Berg and Pete both hate Justin. Berg and Justin both compete for Ashley's love but she apparently dumps both of them. While trying to break Ashley and Justin up Berg almost ends up breaking up Sharon and Johnny.
24	11	"Two Guys, a Girl and a Limo"	Leonard R. Garner Jr.	Barry Wernick	December 9, 1998	2ABZ11	13.01
Pete enlists the help of TV love guru, Adam Carolla when Berg calls Ashley to tell her that he thinks they shouldn't see each other anymore. Meanwhile, Sharon becomes jealous of Johnny's fishing companion Shawn, when she discovers that Shawn is a woman.
25	12	"Two Guys, a Girl and a Christmas Story"	Michael Lembeck	Michelle Milzow	December 16, 1998	2ABZ13	11.27
Pete embarks on a new relationship with an older woman who has a 10-year-old son. Sharon is having trouble organizing an office Christmas party and it's only 4 days till Christmas. Berg is having trouble with one of his older patients who doesn't seem to like him.
26	13	"Two Guys, a Girl and a Gamble"	Michael Lembeck	Paige Bernhardt & Liz Sagal	January 6, 1999	2ABZ12	15.52
Pete is put in charge of watching Michael after school which is fine, until he asks Berg to do it for a day. Berg brings Michael to the dog track to help him learn his fractions. Sharon asks Johnny to move in with her.
27	14	"Two Guys, a Girl and a Proposal"	Gil Junger	Stevie Ray Fromstein	January 13, 1999	2ABZ14	13.35
When Sharon uses an embarrassing underwear ad that Berg had posed for four years prior, for a contest he goes to great lengths to get one of her. Pete realizing he has no parental rights with Michael because he's just the guy dating the mother asks Kaitlyn to marry him. She refuses on the basis that they've only known each other a month and tells him that they should take a break from each other for a while.
28	15	"Two Guys, a Girl and Graduation"	Amanda Bearse	Rick Wiener	February 3, 1999	2ABZ15	14.68
When Sharon is up for a new job, she is told that she never graduated from college. When she goes to verify this, she learns that she hadn't paid her $210 of parking tickets. She had given the money to Pete and Berg so they could go and pay them. She pays for the tickets but finds out that the requirements have changed and she needs to retake freshman English. When she puts two and two together she thinks that instead of paying for her tickets that the guys had bought a $200 bottle of champagne instead. She later learns the truth which is that the money she had given them to pay the fines was actually used to bail her father out of jail after he caused a drunken ruckus due to his recent bankruptcy and the fact that he had just lost his job. The champagne that Pete and Berg had was actually a gift from a girl they had never met before.
29	16	"Two Guys, a Girl and Valentine's Day"	Gil Junger	Vince Calandra	February 10, 1999	2ABZ16	13.79
Irene misunderstands Pete when he comes to her for help and ends up thinking he is in love with her. When Pete realises he cannot get rid of her, he decides to just go along with it. Sharon continues to be jealous of Shawn's relationship with Johnny so decides to set her up with Berg. Berg figures out that Shawn is in love with Johnny. Everything comes to a climax when Sharon and Johnny, Berg and Shawn and Pete and Irene all go out for Valentine's dinner together when Sharon and Johnny's relationship is left in jeopardy.
30	17	"Two Guys, a Girl and the Storm of the Century" (Part 1)	Ellen Gittelsohn	Story by : Rick Wiener; Teleplay by : Mark Ganzel & Kenny Schwartz	February 17, 1999	2ABZ17	13.97
Berg falls in love with a TV newswoman and goes right in the eye of a huge storm just to ask her out. She agrees but just right after she leaves Berg and Pete's apartment Ashley shows up to tell Berg that she broke up with Justin because Berg's the one she wants.
31	18	"Two Guys, a Girl and Ashley's Return" (Part 2)	Michael Lembeck	Barry Wernick	March 10, 1999	2ABZ18	12.53
Ashley comes back and tells Berg she dumped Justin to be with him. Berg now has quite a dilemma, choose Ashley the woman he's been chasing for months or Vanita a woman he's just met. He wants to choose Vanita because he thinks he has a better chance with her. So he dumps Ashley but she won't let go she follows him to the restaurant where he has a date with Vanita and ends up breaking them up. Johnny and Sharon get back together.
32	19	"Two Guys, a Girl and a Fighter"	Ellen Gittelsohn	Vince Calandra & Stevie Ray Fromstein	March 17, 1999	2ABZ19	11.43
Berg gives Ashley a key to his and Pete's apartment without telling Pete. Pete doesn't like this because he hates Ashley. Ashley doesn't find out that Pete hates her until Sharon tells her. Now Ashley won't talk to Pete, and Sharon won't talk to Ashley because Ashley said Sharon has a big mouth. But they all find someone to blame for this: Johnny. Berg becomes a ringside fight doctor but gets fired when he tells the fighter that he should call it quits because he has extreme brain damage.
33	20	"Two Guys, a Girl and a Mother's Day"	Ellen Gittelsohn	Story by : Rick Wiener; Teleplay by : Mark Ganzel, Kenny Schwartz	May 12, 1999	2ABZ20	9.95
When Ashley becomes enamoured with their new professor (Anthony Head) and he hires her as his new assistant, Berg becomes jealous. Convinced that something untoward is going on, he decides to keep tabs on them. Johnny's sisters are in town along with their kids and Sharon is intimidated by how maternal they all are, three of them being currently pregnant. She worries that she will not want to be a mother but when one of Johnny's sisters goes into labour, she gains a new perspective.
34	21	"Two Guys, a Girl and Barenaked Ladies"	Ellen Gittelsohn	Donald Beck	May 19, 1999	2ABZ21	10.76
Wanting something more out of life, Pete quits his job at the pizza place and seeks the advice of a career counsellor, who tells him he has an aptitude for a job in architecture or the food industry. He ends up getting a place as a trainee therapist, but it doesn't go very well. The Barenaked Ladies are in Boston and following Pete around, narrating his day with songs. Meanwhile, Sharon and Ashley bond by getting their nails done and having 'girl talk', which much to Berg's annoyance involves sharing embarrassing secrets about him.
35	22	"Two Guys, a Girl and an Engagement" (Part 1)	Michael Lembeck	Story by : Keith Bickford; Teleplay by : Casey Johnson & David Windsor	May 26, 1999	2ABZ22	11.91
Sharon thinks Johnny is cheating on her so refuses to leave his side. Johnny tells Pete and Berg that he is going to propose to Sharon and so they help distract her while he runs around making the arrangements. While Berg sets up the pizza place to look like Rick's Café from Casablanca for the proposal, Ashley drops a bomb from her past. Pete consults a priest over whether or not to tell Sharon that he is in love with her. To be continued...

=== Season 3 (1999–2000) ===
No. overall	No. in season	Title	Directed by	Written by	Original release date	Prod. code	Viewers (millions)
36	1	"A New Hope"	Michael Lembeck	Kevin Abbott	September 22, 1999	3ABZ01	11.19
Sharon can't seem to give Johnny an answer at first but eventually comes out with "Yes, in theory" as it's obvious she's not sure about marrying him but doesn't want to hurt his feelings. Pete flies to Paris to get away from everything and gets hit by a car driven by a beautiful French woman that he later starts dating, even though she can't speak a word of English.
37	2	"Au Revoir, Pizza Place"	Michael Lembeck	Vince Calandra	September 29, 1999	3ABZ02	10.32
Pete returns from France with a new girlfriend, the woman who ran him over in Paris. He thinks he's in love with her until he finds out she is a racist. Berg feels old when a new employee calls him sir. He quits his job at the pizza place. Sharon realizes she really wants to marry Johnny. blink-182 guest star as themselves performing What's My Age Again? naked at the pizza place.
38	3	"Teacher's Pet Peeve"	Michael Lembeck	Mike Larsen	October 6, 1999	3ABZ03	11.05
After a conversation with Ashley, Pete becomes paranoid and thinks that Johnny is trying to kill him because he had feelings for Sharon. When Johnny finds out that Pete is afraid of him, he decides to have a little fun. Berg and Ashley start their medical residency, but when Berg switches rotations, his new supervisor rides him hard, making him help nurses do the filing and candy-striper work because she does not think he is taking the programme seriously and will not make a good doctor.
39	4	"Career Day"	Michael Lembeck	Rick Wiener	October 13, 1999	3ABZ04	9.45
Ashley's ex-husband plays a prank on Berg by making him believe that Ashley used to beat him. Pete tries to get Sharon a new job and in anticipation she quits her old job before finding out she didn't get the job.
40	5	"Sunday in the Apartment"	Leonard R. Garner Jr.	Donald Beck	October 20, 1999	3ABZ05	11.20
Sharon and Johnny fight over wedding plans, Berg and Ashley also fight and Pete runs into a crazy ex-girlfriend.
41	6	"Halloween 2: Mind over Body"	Leonard R. Garner Jr.	Kenny Schwartz	October 27, 1999	3ABZ06	10.22
A mad scientist switches Pete's brain with Ashley's brain and Berg's brain with Sharon's brain and the only who can help them is Johnny.
42	7	"Berg's New Roommate"	Michael Lembeck	Stevie Ray Fromstein	November 3, 1999	3ABZ07	11.13
Berg freaks out when he realizes that Ashley has moved in with him, and in fact they have been living together for over a month. Sick of having to wait for Ashley to get out of the bathroom in the mornings, Pete convinces Berg to ask her to move out. However he changes his mind when Ashley offers him more than her share of the rent, plus a date with the nurse of his choice if he lets her live there. With only one date available for a wedding in the church where Sharon and Johnny want to get married, they have to compete with another couple to prove that they are more ready to get married than them. They get the church after Sharon tells the priest a story about Johnny staying up all night talking her through a difficult time. However this causes conflict with Johnny, as the story was actually about her and Pete.
43	8	"Foul Play"	Michael Lembeck	Jennifer Celotta	November 10, 1999	3ABZ08	12.69
Berg and Ashley spend the weekend at his parents place to try and spice up their relationship. Pete introduces Sharon and Johnny to the Kama Sutra.
44	9	"Talking Turkey"	Ted Wass	Vince Calandra & Stevie Ray Fromstein	November 17, 1999	3ABZ10	13.11
Ashley invites a hobo over for Thanksgiving dinner and he gets the whole gang fighting with made up stories. Ashley moves in with Sharon and Johnny.
45	10	"Liver and Learn"	Ted Wass	Liz Sagal & Paige Bernhardt	November 24, 1999	3ABZ11	10.15
Ashley finally moves out into Sharon and Johnny's apartment, but then Pete's grandfather Charlie moves in. Berg takes him to the hospital for a check-up and discovers he has a liver problem and therefore only 6 months to live. Johnny accidentally walks in on Ashley while she is getting dressed and becomes embarrassed. Sharon finds this hilarious until she realizes that she wishes Johnny was still taken by surprise when he sees her naked.
46	11	"A Moving Script"	Gail Mancuso	Pat Bullard	December 1, 1999	3ABZ12	10.72
Sharon and Johnny move to the basement because it's cheaper but when Sharon discovers that Johnny has over 23 thousand dollars in the bank she wants to stay. Johnny refuses to go back up because he says that that's his life savings and that he wants to buy a house. Ashley gets a new roommate but Berg scares him away to get even at her for scaring away a nurse he was trying to get a phone number from. Pete is afraid to pick up a package that came in the mail for him because Irene is holding it for him.
47	12	"Out with the Old"	Gail Mancuso	Mike Larsen	December 15, 1999	3ABZ13	10.29
Berg treats Robert Goulet for an ear infection. When Goulet learns that he cannot fly to the destination where he is doing a gig, Berg seizes the opportunity to get him to sing at Ashley's New Year's Eve party. But Berg has to work that night, so he swaps with another doctor whom Ashley has a crush on. She thinks he did it intentionally. Johnny tries to get out of a romantic evening with Sharon to hear Robert sing saying that his late grandfather used to sit him on his lap when he was a kid and play some of Goulet's songs. Pete invites Irene to the party and she surprises him by acting normal. He even starts to fancy her, but Goulet moves in on his gal before he can get anywhere with her. To be a nice guy, Berg goes back to the hospital and swaps back his shift with the English doctor that Ashley likes. Ashley goes to the hospital to thank him and they end up having sex on a hospital bed.
48	13	"Bridesmaid Revisited"	Michael Lembeck	Barry Wernick	January 5, 2000	3ABZ09	8.83
Sharon and Ashley get drunk and in her drunken stupor Sharon asks Ashley to be one of her bridesmaids, but regrets it when sober. Pete, Johnny and Berg go to a laundromat/bar. Pete tries to meet a woman but blows it. Johnny uses fake quarters and gets caught. Berg gets his clothes stolen.
49	14	"The Monitor Story"	Leonard R. Garner Jr.	Donald Beck & Vince Calandra	January 19, 2000	3ABZ15	11.51
Sharon and Johnny discover a hidden room in their apartment, which contains a TV monitor that is hooked up to every apartment in the building. They quickly become glued to the screens, enjoying watching their friends when they think no one else is looking. Sharon sees it as an opportunity to meddle in other people's lives. Berg and Ashley get back in the dating swing, but only to make each other jealous. Irene is stealing items that belong to Pete, and Sharon fears she may be dangerous.
50	15	"The Wedding Dress"	Leonard R. Garner Jr.	Rick Wiener & Kenny Schwartz	January 26, 2000	3ABZ14	10.53
Pete searches for a woman he slept with only to find out she's getting married and he was her last one night stand. Ashley gets her arm stuck in the garbage disposal while trying to fix it herself and has to be nice to Johnny so he will help her. Berg comes to the realisation that he will never have a successful relationship, while Sharon goes shopping for wedding dress on sale.
51	16	"A Rookie Script"	Michael Lembeck	Casey Johnson & David Windsor	February 9, 2000	3ABZ16	11.81
Sharon and Johnny have a yard sale to try to get some money together. Pete gets angry with Johnny for selling him a broken toaster. Berg gets jealous when Ashley starts dating baseball superstar Nomar Garciaparra and Pete becomes starstruck and fawning all over Nomar. Sharon is organising a bachelor auction to raise money for the children's hospital and when he hears that Nomar has signed up to do it, Berg enters as a chance to compete with him. When things do not go well at the auction, Berg starts drinking and ends up making a fool out of himself.
52	17	"Feast or Fireman"	Ted Wass	Paige Bernhardt & Liz Sagal	February 16, 2000	3ABZ17	10.56
Everyone at the hospital is making fun of Berg for his actions at the bachelor auction so he tries to regain their respect by working non-stop. People are particularly impressed when there is a situation in the hospital and Berg remains on top of it. However, he makes a serious mistake in his over-tired state and almost kills a patient. In an effort to do more rewarding activities, Sharon volunteers to read to children at the hospital but ends up becoming a patient herself. Pete becomes a volunteer fireman but is subject to the pranks the other firemen play on him.
53	18	"Once Again from the Beginning"	Ted Wass	Story by : Kenny Schwartz; Teleplay by : Stevie Ray Fromstein & Rick Wiener	March 15, 2000	3ABZ18	10.10
Pete and Ashley get mugged while waiting for the subway, Sharon and Johnny have trouble writing their wedding vows, Berg is afraid he might screw up at the hospital again when he's called in to replace a sick doctor and Irene's dad visits.
54	19	"War Stories"	Michael Lembeck	Jennifer Celotta	March 22, 2000	3ABZ20	11.65
Pete, Berg and Johnny share bad stories about women.
55	20	"Two Guys, a Girl and a Bachelorette"	Michael Lembeck	Story by : Rick Wiener; Teleplay by : Stevie Ray Fromstein & Kenny Schwartz	April 12, 2000	3ABZ22	9.74
It's nearing the wedding and Johnny is having his bachelor party so Berg arranges for him, Pete and Sharon to hang out at O'Malley's, their favourite bar from college. However Berg is upset when Johnny leaves his bachelor party early and crashes their night. Also, the guys at the firehouse convince Pete that Marti is interested in him, causing him to begin to realize his own feelings for her.
56	21	"Love Shack"	Gail Mancuso	Barry Wernick	April 26, 2000	3ABZ19	8.19
The guys at the firehouse find Pete's make-up bag and the fire chief asks Pete to give his daughter a makeover. In hopes of getting off probation at the hospital Berg lends his apartment to his superior so she can take a nap, but she ends up having an affair instead. Berg rats her out to her superior, who in turn wants to use the apartment for the same reason. Sharon throws a hospital fundraiser tea party in Pete and Berg's apartment on the same night, but Berg's superior's superior shows up first and thinks that she's running a prostitution ring.
57	22	"Another Moving Script"	Ted Wass	Pat Bullard	May 3, 2000	3ABZ23	9.25
Johnny's friend Shawn shows up pregnant and Sharon cannot hide her jealousy when Johnny offers to be her Lamaze partner. They get into a fight were Johnny admits he feels neglected by Sharon while she does her charity work. Berg meets Marti at the hospital and unaware she is Pete's co-worker asks her out. This causes Pete to realize his feelings for Marti and despite telling Berg to go out with her, becomes jealous and ruins their date. Meanwhile Germ is trying to track down who has been stealing hospital supplies.
58	23	"The Undercard"	Michael Lembeck	Vince Calandra	May 10, 2000	3ABZ21	8.33
Sharon and Johnny get joint checking accounts but Johnny is annoyed when Sharon makes all the important choices. Pete is anxiously waiting to hear whether he has been accepted into fireman boot camp. When Marti finds out she has got in, Pete can only think about himself rather than being pleased for her. Berg feels like his life is going nowhere and becomes depressed. Looking to cheer himself up, he goes to visit his parents only to find out that his father no longer lives there.
59	24	"El Matrimonio Loco"	Leonard R. Garner Jr.	Kevin Abbott & Donald Beck	May 17, 2000	3ABZ24	9.05
After her huge fight with Johnny, Sharon cancels the wedding. However, they make up and realize they need to get married before they chicken out so Irene throws them a wedding on the roof of the building. Pete and Berg are fighting as Pete gets ready to head off to fireman boot camp and Pete and Marti decide to be together. At the wedding, Berg seeks comfort in the arms of someone most unexpected.

=== Season 4 (2000–01) ===
No. overall	No. in season	Title	Directed by	Written by	Original release date	Prod. code	Viewers (millions)
60	1	"The Bear"	Leonard R. Garner Jr.	Donald Beck & Vince Calandra	October 4, 2000	4ABZ01	7.78
It's the morning after the wedding and Berg and Irene regret sleeping together. They desperately want to keep it a secret and are on a mission to steal the photographs from the wedding before anyone sees them. At fireman boot camp, Pete sneaks off in the middle of the night to meet up with Marti. She's late and he ends up being mauled by a bear. He has to go home and thinks Marti does not care for him when she doesn't follow him back to Boston. Sharon and Johnny are honeymooning in a hotel in Boston and Sharon becomes irritated with him when continues to be tight with money. Johnny eventually explains it is because he bought a house that needs a lot of work done to it. Ashley is on the warpath when Nomar breaks up with her because of something Pete told him.
61	2	"Meat"	Leonard R. Garner Jr.	Mike Larsen	October 11, 2000	4ABZ02	7.29
Berg feels like he's treating Irene like a piece of meat as they continue secretly sleeping together, no strings attached. Pete gets his fireman's badge for good deeds. Johnny plans to christen the new house but Sharon keeps finding an excuse to stop him from doing it. Nomar wants to get back together with Ashley but she doesn't want to for other reasons.
62	3	"15 Minutes of Shame"	Gail Mancuso	Allison M. Gibson	October 18, 2000	4ABZ04	6.06
Having caught them having sex in his house, Johnny confronts Berg about him and Irene. Berg convinces him to keep it a secret but when Sharon notices something is going on, she is determined to get Johnny to tell her what it is. Nomar does an interview saying he is thinking of leaving Boston and the Red Sox because he is heartbroken over Ashley. Much to Pete's delight, an angry mob of Red Sox fans camps outside the apartment building.
63	4	"The Satanic Curses"	Leonard R. Garner Jr.	Barry Wernick	October 25, 2000	4ABZ03	6.72
When Pete, Berg and Sharon won't let Irene watch scary movies with them she puts a curse on them. The next day Pete has Ashley's head grow out of his shoulder, Berg becomes ugly and Sharon wakes up with a penis.
64	5	"A Germ Runs Through It"	Gail Mancuso	Kevin Abbott	November 1, 2000	4ABZ06	6.72
Germ acts as a marriage counselor for Johnny and Sharon. Sharon wants Johnny to hurry up and finish the house so she hires a carpenter to help him but he wants to do it himself. Marti breaks up with Pete and leaves him for Nomar.
65	6	"The One Without Dialogue"	Leonard R. Garner Jr.	Vince Calandra	November 8, 2000	4ABZ07	6.48
Pete tries to locate a woman he saw on the subway, Johnny tries to fix Ashley's bathroom plumbing and he has to turn off the building's water supply, which leaves Berg with a head full of shampoo. A dog follows Sharon home and she has him lick the dishes clean but he accidentally eats her wedding ring. Ashley refuses to give up her seat on the subway to a pregnant woman so four pregnant women hound her.
66	7	"Disco Nights"	Gail Mancuso	Stevie Ray Fromstein	November 15, 2000	4ABZ05	7.04
Pete, Berg and Johnny try to get into a club, but end up drinking beer outside a convenience store after Johnny complains about the price of the beer. When they return later to the club with Germ, none of them are allowed in except for Germ. They then go back to the convenience store, but Pete and Berg end up getting arrested for drinking in the street. Sharon finds out that Johnny doesn't wear his wedding ring and goes out with Ashley to the club to try to help Ashley find a man - and for Sharon to find Johnny so she can kill him. But they end up having a great time and get piles of phone numbers from single guys.
67	8	"My Dinner with Irene"	Leonard R. Garner Jr.	Casey Johnson & David Windsor	November 22, 2000	4ABZ08	6.78
Berg and Irene decide to go on a date to see if they could be an actual couple and not just sex buddies but when Irene sees Pete sad she asks him out instead. They go to dinner and Berg tags along but Irene dumps Pete. Johnny doesn't like all the time that Sharon is spending with Ashley.
68	9	"Drip"	Leonard R. Garner Jr.	Barry Wernick	November 29, 2000	4ABZ09	5.20
When water starts dripping into Pete and Berg's apartment in the middle of the night, they both have to find somewhere to sleep. Berg tries Irene's and Ashley's but ends up crashing on Sharon and Johnny's couch. They use Berg, who is acting like a child, to prove what types of parents they would be. Pete ends up at Irene's door a few times, leading her to think he is obsessed with her. This idea drives him crazy but the more he tries to prove he is not, the more she is convinced he wants her.
69	10	"Rescue Me"	Robby Benson	Mike Larsen	December 13, 2000	4ABZ10	6.35
The gang go out for dinner together at a restaurant filled with old people. When a man chokes on his food, Sharon is caught on tape saving his life. A local news station broadcasts the story and points out that a doctor and fireman were there and did nothing and Pete and Berg are embarrassed. To prove themselves, they try to save someone's life and tape it. Ashley gets in trouble with the law, when a policeman suspects her of drink driving. Ashley is rude to him and ends up in jail. Rather than just apologise, she insists in having her day in court to stand up for herself, but soon realises this is a bad idea.
70	11	"Burning Down the House"	Dana deVally Piazza	Rick Wiener & Kenny Schwartz	January 3, 2001	4ABZ11	8.61
Berg's mom comes to stay when she and Berg's dad split up. Berg becomes annoyed when she is staying out late every night at bars and clubs. Johnny and Sharon's new house burns down. When talking to the fire inspector, Pete realises he caused the fire, ironically from not disposing properly of the smoke detector box.
71	12	"Give Mommy a Kiss"	Wil Shriner	Pat Bullard	January 17, 2001	4ABZ12	7.76
Pete and Berg's mother Susan grow closer, leading to a kiss that they both are embarrassed about but feel something there. Berg sets his mom up with Felix Shaw, the Fire Chief. Ashley gives Johnny a stock market tip that earns him a lot of money but he decides not to tell Sharon about it. Berg and Irene make up and decide to officially become girlfriend and boyfriend. However they get in a fight when Berg won't introduce her to his mother so Irene thinks he is ashamed of her.
72	13	"I've Got a Secret"	Kim Rozenfeld	Donald Beck	January 31, 2001	4ABZ13	8.34
Berg and Irene decide to tell Pete about their relationship. Berg chickens out but tells Irene that he has already told Pete. Johnny buys Ashley an expensive scarf to thank her for her stock market tip but Sharon finds it in the apartment and thinks Johnny is going to give it to her. Pete is worried that Berg is going to find out about him and Susan and so avoids Berg. He also tries to grow a goatee but when he can't fill it in, Sharon draws it on for him with her eyebrow pencil. All the secrets come out in the open when Irene decides to throw a 'Boston Tea Party' for Susan.
73	14	"The Aftermath"	Rocco Urbisci	Bill Freiberger	February 7, 2001	4ABZ14	6.61
Pete's affair with Berg's mother affects their friendship. Pete tries to decide whether or not to follow Susan to Albany and risk his friendship with Berg. Irene tries to be supportive of Berg, but changes her mind when she realises that it was not just a casual fling, but that Pete is in love with Susan.
74	15	"An Eye for a Finger"	Andrew Susskind	Stevie Ray Fromstein	February 14, 2001	4ABZ15	6.52
Pete accidentally cuts the tip of his finger whilst making a salad and trying to apologise to Berg for sleeping with his mother. Berg takes him to hospital via taxi, as he says it will be quicker than ambulance or bus. But when they get out of the taxi, Berg leaves the finger behind and spends most of the day trying to find it. But it turns out that Pete is playing a trick on him, as he wants Berg to accept his apology. Berg accepts the apology thinking that Pete's finger is long gone but Pete had it the whole time. Ashley gives a reluctant Johnny a psychological test for a project, and ends up getting some very interesting insights. Meanwhile, Sharon gets a job as the assistant of a crooked lawyer, and only realises when they claim $30,000 for a man who "lost the use of his legs". But she keeps the job in attempt to clean his illegal ways
75	16	"A Few Good Firemen"	Wil Shriner	Liz Sagal	February 28, 2001	4ABZ16	6.81
It is Johnny's birthday and Sharon gets him a voucher to be a fireman for a day. It turns out to be day for kids but Johnny comes home wanting to become a fireman. When a nurse at the hospital says that chivalry is dead after Berg cuts in line in front of her, Berg becomes obsessed with proving he can be chivalrous.
76	17	"Adventures of Captain Karma"	Wil Shriner	Casey Johnson & David Windsor	March 7, 2001	4ABZ17	5.94
Berg is hurt and upset when he tells Irene he loves her and she doesn't say it back. Pete convinces him to go to a comic book convention to cheer him up, where he meets a girl who he went to high school with. After running into her again later that day, Berg is convinced it was fate and takes her number. Pete and Ashley run into each other in the line for the cinema and end up going on a sort of date together.
77	18	"Make Mine Tea"	Michael Lembeck	Pat Bullard	April 18, 2001	4ABZ18	6.15
Despite having made up with Irene, Berg still plans to meet up with Katie and arranges a clandestine rendezvous with her. Pete helps Sharon when she is sent to get incriminating photographs for a client at the law firm she works at.
78	19	"The Love Boat"	Robby Benson	Casey Johnson & David Windsor	April 25, 2001	4ABZ20	8.12
Berg tries to woo Irene so she'll take him back, Pete agrees to be Ashley's date at a hospital mixer where she wins a residency at Stanford in California, Sharon and Johnny spend their anniversary at the fire house when Johnny has to work.
79	20	"The Icewoman Cometh"	Gail Mancuso	Barry Wernick	May 2, 2001	4ABZ19	7.00
Pete has a near death experience and he believes that he and Ashley are meant to be together. Ashley has a dream about Pete so she goes to talk to him and they end up sleeping together. Berg wants to see if there can be anything between him and Katie and he discovers that she's been stalking him for eight years. Irene won't take Berg back because now she's seeing her mailman.
80	21	"Should I Stay or Should I Go?"	Michael Lembeck	Rick Wiener & Kenny Schwartz	May 9, 2001	4ABZ21	6.43
A jealous Berg tries to get Irene back but ends up screwing it up again, as he won't leave her alone and keeps on having conflicts with Roger, her new mailman-boyfriend. Pete tries to convince Ashley to stay by spending more time with her and making her a picnic in the park, but he gets stood up because Ashley doesn't want to get involved with Pete as she's moving, and it will end in heartache when she does leave. Johnny wants to spend more time with Sharon, so he helps Sharon serve a subpoena to a man who has a scary dog, and they spend the day together trying to get through the garden to his letter box.
81	22	"The Internet Show"	Michael Lembeck	Donald Beck & Vince Calandra	May 16, 2001	4ABZ22	7.65
Sharon thinks she may be pregnant and Ashley realises she could be too. She goes into denial, despite showing the symptoms but agrees to take a pregnancy test with Sharon. When Berg finds out from a news report that a glow in the dark condom he used was defective he thinks Irene could be pregnant. Not wanting to worry her, he tries to get a urine sample from her without telling her. Pete is still annoyed at Ashley for giving up on their relationship to go to Stanford.
