= The Pilot (Two Guys and a Girl) =

- Two Guys and a Girl episode
- Episode no.: Season 1 Episode 1
- Directed by: James Widdoes
- Written by: Danny Jacobson; Kenny Schwartz; Rick Weiner
- Original air date: March 11, 1998
- Running time: 21:51

Episode chronology
← Previous —	Next → "Two Guys, A Girl And A Presentation"

"The Pilot" is the first episode from the ABC sitcom Two Guys and a Girl. The episode aired on March 11, 1998. It is the only episode of the first two seasons to not have "Two Guys, A Girl And..." in the title.

== Plot ==
=== Plot summary ===
Pete tells Berg and Sharon that he is going to break up with his girlfriend Melissa because he doesn't think "she's the one" but he then decides not to. When Melissa jokingly asks Berg "What have you done to my Pete?" unaware that Pete changed his mind, Berg says,"Hey, I told him not to break up with you." Melissa, getting angry breaks up with Pete. Berg tries to fix it, but as a result of taking part in some medical experiments can only tell the truth and ends up making things worse.

=== Plot synopsis ===
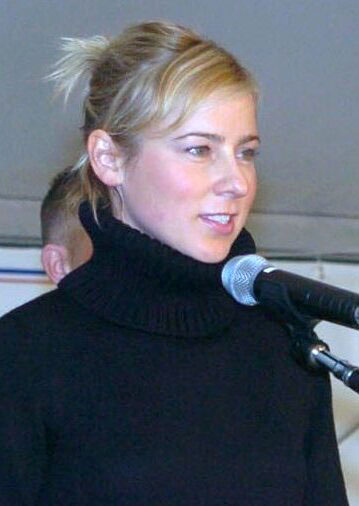
Traylor Howard played the role of Sharon Carter.

Berg interrupts Pete as he's studying for a class. Pete is noticeably in a bad mood as he's breaking up with Melissa today. Berg asks what Melissa's quirk is due to Pete's poor experiences with dating and focusing on everything that is wrong with that person. Pete tells Berg that, during sex, Melissa laughs uncontrollably in a psychotic manner. Berg says that Pete is overreacting and that he would be making a mistake if he broke up with her. Worrying that he might be late, Pete refuses to listen to Berg's advice. Berg then exclaims that Sharon will be down to drive him to class any minute. Sharon is then introduced as a hot-headed and sardonic person as she enters and throws an empty toilet paper case at Berg. Berg has been taking experimental drugs to get extra money and constantly talks into a tape recorder evaluating the results. Pete quickly explains how China is giving back the leise on Hong Kong and compares his and Melissa's relationship to that.

Later, at Beacon Street Pizza, Pete tries to break up with Melissa despite many distractions from Mr. Bauer (David Ogden Stiers), the deranged old man who claims that scenes from movies are his own life experiences, and Bill (Julius Carry), the owner of Beacon Street Pizza. Berg and Bill sit patiently close by as Melissa tells Pete that China won't give up the lease to Hong Kong for at least another 50 years. Pete, as a result, realizes that he would be making a mistake if he broke up with Melissa. Melissa identifies that Pete is acting mysterious and therefore asks "Berg what have you done to him" to which Berg replies, "Hey, this isn't me, I'm the one who told him not to break up with you". Pete panics and tries to cover himself by saying that Berg is lying. Whilst trying to stop her from leaving, Pete is dumped by her causing him to be incredulous with Berg.

Then, Pete realizes what he has lost and loiters around the pizza place. Berg, trying to win back the friendship of Pete, goes to Melissa's apartment to straighten everything out. Unfortunately, Berg sees that he has become honest and rigid, realizing that the experimental drug has a side effect, he must tell the truth. He tells Melissa nice things that Pete has said about her but then blurts out that she "laughs like a mad scientist during sex". Meanwhile, Sharon is told that she isn't a people person and covers Berg at the pizza place which results in her losing her temper with a customer.

Berg tells Pete of his mishap and hopes that Pete will forgive him. To redeem himself from the breakup, Pete goes to Melissa's to straighten everything out and comes back cheerful as him and Melissa are deciding to give it another shot. The episode ends with Berg and Sharon saying that Pete should lie to Melissa so that they can go and down "Pop 'n' Shot" at O'Malley's just after they got back together.

== Cast ==
=== Main ===
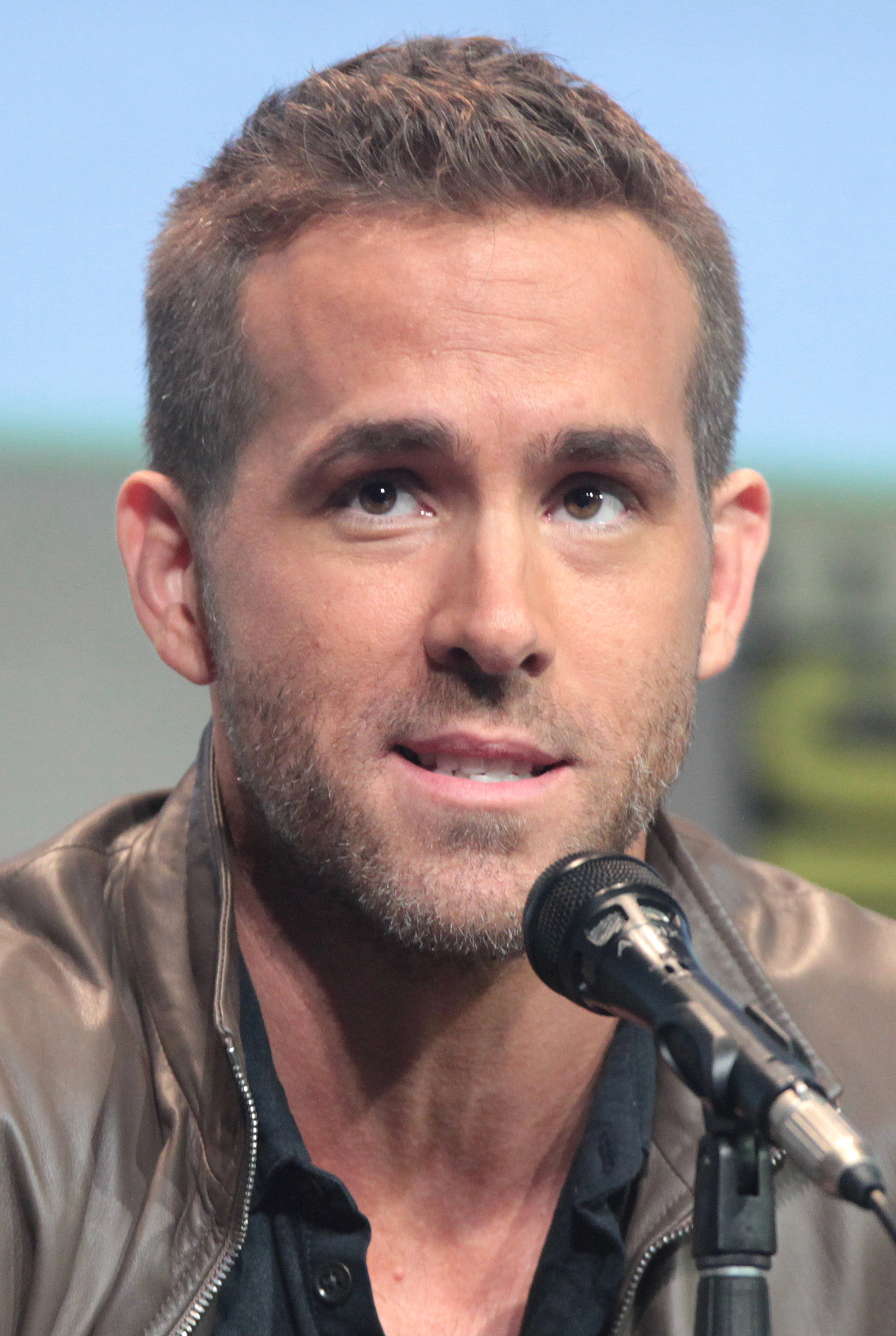
Ryan Reynolds portrayed the role of Michael "Berg" Bergen. He and Richard Ruccolo had met three months previous to the audition and instantly connected with each other.

- Ryan Reynolds as Michael "Berg" Bergen
- Richard Ruccolo as Pete Dunville
- Traylor Howard as Sharon Carter
- Julius Carry as Bill
- David Ogden Stiers as Mr. Bauer
- Jennifer Westfeldt as Melissa

=== Secondary ===
- Ed Levey as Customer

== Reception ==
The episode was given positive reviews and a very high Nielsen rating due to its large number of viewers and audience share. The episode first aired on March 11, 1998, and was watched by 17.94 million viewers, ranking #11 for the week. Preceding the second highest rated episode of The Drew Carrey Show, Two Guys and a Girl performed to a high standard for its first episode resulting in ABC's biggest opening night since Spin City.

The episode has been given a 7.2 out of 10 on the IMDb. As well as a score of 9.9 at TV.com, "The Pilot" ranks 46,246 out of all 120,171 episodes (of all shows) on TV.com.
