= World Gone Wild =

1988 film by Lee H. Katzin

- Theatrical release poster
- Directed by: Lee H. Katzin
- Written by: Jorge Zamacona
- Starring: Bruce Dern; Michael Paré; Catherine Mary Stewart
- Cinematography: Don Burgess
- Music by: Laurence Juber
- Distributed by: Apollo Pictures
- Release date: May 20, 1988 (United States)
- Running time: 95 minutes
- Country: United States
- Language: English
- Budget: $4 million
- Box office: $323,947

World Gone Wild is a 1988 science fiction film directed by Lee H. Katzin, and starring Bruce Dern, Catherine Mary Stewart and Michael Paré.

== Plot ==
In the nuclear-ravaged wasteland of Earth in the year 2087, rain has not fallen for fifty years and water is as precious as life itself. The isolated town of Lost Wells, an outpost that survived the holocaust, is led by Ethan, a Moses-like guru and the last schoolteacher on the planet, Angie. The inhabitants of the town guard the secret of their existence and source of their water from the outside world. The "town" consist of a Mobil station surrounded by a wall of old cars. The school takes place in an old school bus. One of the few books still in existence and held by the town is an unabridged book on etiquette by Emily Post. An evil cult of pseudoreligious renegades led by Derek, a group following the teachings in a book on Charles Manson discovers the existence of the water source and wants control of the town's valuable water supply. As the villagers are no match for Derek's brute military force, they hire mercenaries living in a distant city. That group includes Nitro, Ten Watt and they are led by George Landon. The townspeople and the mercenaries team up to stage a last ditch defense of the town.

== Cast ==
- Bruce Dern as Ethan
- Michael Paré as George Landon
- Catherine Mary Stewart as Angie
- Adam Ant as Derek Abernathy
- Anthony James as Ten Watt
- Rick Podell as Exline
- Julius Carry as Nitro (credited as Julius J. Carry III)
- Alan Autry as Hank
- Mindy McEnnan as Kate
- Bryan J. Thompson as Matthew
- Nancy Parsons as Rape Victim

== Production ==
The film was commissioned by Apollo Pictures in 1986, although it was ultimately released by Lorimar Studios. Principal photography began in Arizona in March 1987. Originally the book used by Derek's cult was to be L. Ron Hubbard's Dianetics: The Modern Science of Mental Health, but the book was changed to a book about Charles Manson after the Church of Scientology (A religion founded by Hubbard and which uses the Dianetics book as a holy text) which uses threatened a lawsuit.

== Reception ==
The film was nominated for a Young Artist Award in 1989. It received two out of five stars in Creature Feature. Dern was praised by Lee H. Katzin, but the source material was found lacking. The film was found to be a mix of Mad Max and The Magnificent Seven. Similarly, The Washington Post found the script lacking. The New York Times found the movie to be a standard-issue, post-apocalyptic film in the vein of Mad Max, although the attempts at dark humor were appreciated. Similarly, Kim Newman found the movie to stand out over other post-apocalyptic works due to its offbeat humor and its use of western motifs. The Los Angeles Times positively reviewed the film, citing the Seven Samurai homage and finding it surprisingly reflective. They also appreciated the humor and musical score.
