= Two Guys and a Girl =

American sitcom

- Also known as: Two Guys, a Girl and a Pizza Place (seasons 1–2)
- Genre: Sitcom
- Created by: Danny Jacobson; Kenny Schwartz; Rick Wiener
- Starring: Traylor Howard; Ryan Reynolds; Richard Ruccolo; Nathan Fillion; Suzanne Cryer; Jillian Bach; Jennifer Westfeldt; Julius Carry; David Ogden Stiers
- Composers: Freddy Curci; Tom Rizzo; Mark Vogel
- Country of origin: United States
- Original language: English
- No. of seasons: 4
- No. of episodes: 81 (list of episodes)

Production
- Executive producers: Mark Ganzel; Danny Jacobson; Kenny Schwartz; Marjorie Weitzman; Rick Wiener
- Producers: Donald R. Beck; Vince Calandra; Jan Siegelman
- Cinematography: Julius Metoyer
- Editors: Rick Blue; John Neal
- Camera setup: Multi-camera
- Running time: 20–22 minutes
- Production company: In Front Productions 20th Century Fox Television

Original release
- Network: ABC
- Release: March 11, 1998 – May 16, 2001

Two Guys and a Girl (titled Two Guys, a Girl and a Pizza Place for the first two seasons) is an American television sitcom created by Rick Wiener, Kenny Schwartz, and Danny Jacobson. The series started as a short-run (thirteen episodes) mid-season replacement on March 11, 1998, on ABC. It ran for four seasons, ending with a cliffhanger finale, its 81st episode, on May 16, 2001.

The series stars Ryan Reynolds, Richard Ruccolo, and Traylor Howard as the title characters. Two recurring characters arrived in season two: Johnny Donnelly (Nathan Fillion) and Ashley Walker (Suzanne Cryer). In 2000, for the fourth season, ABC moved the sitcom from midweek to a Friday night death slot, leading to a steep drop in ratings. After the show returned to Wednesday for a two-week trial in an unsuccessful attempt to regain ratings, it was canceled in May 2001. The series finale was titled "The Internet Show", an episode in which fans of the show voted on the characters' outcome online.

== Plot ==
Focusing on the lives of twenty-somethings Michael Bergen, Pete Dunville, and Sharon Carter, the show was originally based on the life of its creator. The fictional "Beacon Street Pizza" was based on a real pizza restaurant named Theo's Pizza in Teele Square in Somerville, Massachusetts, where show creator Kenny Schwartz worked while attending nearby Tufts University. The show is set in Boston, but was filmed at CBS Studio Center in Studio City, Los Angeles.

The series stars Ryan Reynolds as Michael Leslie "Berg" Bergen, Richard Ruccolo as Peter "Pete" Dunville, and Traylor Howard as Sharon Carter (later Carter-Donnelly). In the first two seasons, Berg, a slacker, works at a Boston pizza parlor, Beacon Street Pizza, with Pete. They both attend Tufts University with Sharon, who after graduation, works as the spokesperson for Immaculate Chemicals.

The format of the initial season varies considerably from the other seasons. The first season features Jennifer Westfeldt as Melissa, Pete's girlfriend, and David Ogden Stiers as Mr. Bauer, a delusional old man who frequents the pizza place, pretending that experiences from films are his own. The second season abandons the two characters, focusing on the interplay between Pete and Berg and their relationship with Sharon, who lives in the apartment above them. Berg eventually decides to attend medical school and become a doctor, while Pete drops out of architecture classes to become a career counselor. The second season introduces Johnny Donnelly (Nathan Fillion), a jukebox repairman who starts dating Sharon, and Ashley Walker (Suzanne Cryer), a medical school classmate of Berg's who competes with him to be top of the class.

At the beginning of season three, the pizza place setting is abandoned entirely (hence the change in the show's title), and Berg begins his medical residency. Pete becomes a vice president of a cosmetics company, and then a firefighter. Johnny and Sharon marry and become the superintendents of their apartment building. Berg dates Irene (Jillian Bach), the eccentric neighbor across the hall and Pete begins dating a fellow firefighter named Marti (Tiffani Thiessen).

== Episodes ==
Season	Episodes	Originally released	
Season	Episodes	First released	Last released
1	13	March 11, 1998	July 22, 1998
2	22	September 23, 1998	May 26, 1999
3	24	September 22, 1999	April 26, 2000
4	22	October 6, 2000	May 16, 2001

== Cast and characters ==
=== Main ===
- Ryan Reynolds as Michael Eugene Leslie "Berg" Bergen – the mischievous everyman with boyish looks who often creates chaos in the lives of his friends, particularly Pete. While in college, he has difficulty settling on what he wants to do in life. Eventually, he decides to become a doctor and meets Ashley, a worthy competitor at medical school. They begin a relationship but break up due to her inability to reciprocate his feelings. Near the end of the show, he and Irene, Pete's former stalker, form a relationship.
- Richard Ruccolo as Peter ”Pete” Dunville – often neurotic and anxious about what may occur with his professional and romantic life. Early in the show, he is conflicted about what he wants to do in life. He switches from his dreams of becoming an architect to becoming a firefighter. He has a very brief romance with Sharon. Near the end of the show, he begins a lust-based relationship with Berg's ex-girlfriend, Ashley.
- Traylor Howard as Sharon Carter-Donnelly – a complex woman who is good friends with Pete and Berg. She is known for her self-confidence, but also for her inability to commit to relationships. Eventually, she manages to move past her fears and marries her boyfriend Johnny Donnelly.
- Jennifer Westfeldt as Melissa (1998) – Pete's love interest during the first season. She shows up numerous times after the episode "Two Guys, a Girl and an Apartment", where she and Pete break up, suggesting that episodes aired in the wrong order.
- Julius Carry as Bill (1998) – the smart-mouth owner of Beacon Street Pizza. He only appears during the first season.
- David Ogden Stiers as Mr. Bauer (1998) – only appearing in the first season, he hangs about the pizza place telling stories that are from movies but which he claims to be his own experiences.
- Nathan Fillion as Johnny Donnelly (1999–2001) – arrives in the second season as a jukebox repairman with eyes for Sharon. He and Sharon begin dating with the occasional break-up due to Johnny's long-time friend Shawn (Bobbie Phillips), an attractive woman who often gets in the way of their relationship. The couple marries during the third-season finale. Johnny later decides to become a fireman against Sharon's wishes. Eventually, Sharon and Johnny decide they are ready for children, as seen in the series finale.
- Suzanne Cryer as Ashley Walker (1999–2001) – arrives in the second season and meets Berg at medical school. Initially, she rejects Berg, hoping to keep her long-distance relationship with Justin (Jon Cryer). She eventually starts dating Berg but he then calls it off. At the end of the fourth season, she starts a sexual relationship with Pete and becomes pregnant in the series finale. Viewers were left unable to know what Ashley would do with the baby due to the show's cancellation.
- Jillian Bach as Irene (1999–2001) – arrives mid-season 2 as Pete's stalker. She then forms a sexual relationship with Berg, while maintaining her love for Pete. Toward the middle of season 4, she and Berg start dating but break up due to Berg's other love interest, Katie Connor. Irene then forms a relationship with the mailman, causing Berg to become extremely jealous. The two get back together after an unexpected pregnancy scare.
- Giuseppe Andrews as Germ (2000–2001) – a helper at Tufts Hospital who is noted for his slobbish and uncaring attitude. He first appears in "Au Revoir Pizza Place", season 3/episode 2, and returns later in the series where he becomes a close acquaintance of Pete, Berg, Sharon, and Ashley.

=== Recurring ===
- Maury Ginsberg as Kamen (1998–1999) – thwarted by Berg in "Two Guys, a Girl and Someone Better" where Berg ruins his life. He attempts to get back at Berg on random occasions throughout season 2.
- Bobbie Phillips as Shawn (1998-1999) - Johnny's fishing buddy as well as Sharon's nemesis. Shawn appeared twice in season 2 and made a third appearance in season 3.
- Tiffani Thiessen as Marti (2000) – another love interest of Pete's who continually sasses him at the fire station. She and Pete start dating, to Irene's chagrin. She breaks up with Pete during the fourth season after having an affair with a baseball star.
- Dian Bachar as Roger (2001) – A mailman Irene dates after her breakup with Berg, who always wears shorts with his uniform. Like the Cheers character Cliff Clavin, Roger behaves as if his menial job requires a great amount of skill and effort. Despite his small height, he behaves as if he were tall and muscular, frequently challenging the much more physically intimidating Berg to fights. In the finale, it is revealed that this sense of self-righteousness comes from his status as an army reservist who is trained to snap a man's neck with one hand.

=== Notable guest cast ===
- Carmen Electra as Isabella (1998) – a love interest of Pete's who gets between him and Berg. When Pete feels he must dump Isabella to go to 845 Arlington, Berg tries to stop him. ("Two Guys, a Girl and a Pizza Delivery")
- Kathy Kinney as Mimi (1998) – Kinney played Mimi from The Drew Carey Show on the episode "Two Guys, a Girl and a Psycho Halloween", in a short cameo appearance.
- Fred Willard as Frank Farber (1998) - interviews Pete in "Two Guys, A Girl and a Vacation". He talks to Pete about women he has conquered all around the world until Berg uses a Scottish accent pretending to be his long-lost love child to drive him away.
- Adam Carolla as himself (1998) – Carolla appeared as himself from the talk show Loveline. Pete constantly asks him for advice on dating and career issues when Pete becomes a limo driver in "Two Guys, a Girl and a Limo".
- Anthony Head as Dr. Staretski (1999) – a role model of Ashley's in the episode "Two Guys, a Girl and Mother's Day"; Berg is surprised to learn that he paints nudes.
- Jon Cryer as Justin (1999) – Ashley's long-distance boyfriend who moves to Boston to give their relationship a chance; only appears in 1 episode. ("Two Guys, a Girl and Thanksgiving")
- Conchata Ferrell as Shawn's mother (1999) – Ferrell plays Shawn's mother in the episode "Two Guys, a Girl and Valentine's Day". She shows excitement when meeting Berg after discovering that he is a doctor.
- Blink-182 (1999) – The band appears in the third season where they play at the pizza place naked. This referenced their latest single at the time, "What's My Age Again?". ("Au Revoir Pizza Place")
- Barenaked Ladies (1999) – The band makes an appearance in "Two Guys, a Girl and Barenaked Ladies" where they follow Pete around and sing about his current events.
- Nomar Garciaparra as himself (2000) – becomes a love interest of Ashley's until he falls for Pete's girlfriend Marti.
- Dan Finnerty & The Dan Band (2000) – make an appearance in "Bridesmaids Revisited" where Dan sings female songs throughout the episode as they follow Ashley.

== Story progression ==
=== Season 1 ===
The series premiered on March 11, 1998, as Two Guys, a Girl and a Pizza Place. The episode entitled "The Pilot" was watched by almost 18 million viewers.

The story of season 1 centers around the pizza place. Actors such as Jennifer Westfeldt (Melissa), and Julius Carry (Bill) were credited as secondary cast members to principals Ryan Reynolds, Richard Ruccolo, and Traylor Howard. Mr. Bauer, played by David Ogden Stiers, frequently appeared around the pizza place, telling stories of life events which actually occurred in movies. Pete and Berg share an apartment, on which Pete pays the rent every month, with Berg testing experimental drugs to supplement their income. Pete structures his life around architecture and grad school, while Sharon, their friend upstairs, works for an evil corporation which exploits Earth's natural resources, much to her dislike.

The episodes contained storylines including Pete preparing for a presentation which Berg ruins; Berg stealing the Celtics' '81 championship banner; Sharon joining the softball team; and the story of how they all met. Because the episodes aired out of order, the season seems very disjointed---demonstrated by the status of Pete's relationship with Melissa: in episode 8 – "Party" Melissa and Pete are still together despite having previously broken up in episode 5 – "Apartment". On the DVD release, they are episodes 2 and 7.

=== Season 2 ===
Episodes in season 2 have more of a structure. Two additional primary characters arrived: Ashley Walker (Suzanne Cryer) and Johnny Donnelly (Nathan Fillion), as well as the dismissal of characters Bill, Mr. Bauer, and Pete's long-time girlfriend Melissa.

The cast during Season 2

The season starts with Berg's realization that someone in his class, Walker, is more clever than he is. It leads to an anticipated romance between Berg and Ashley as they both head down the path of becoming physicians. Jukebox repairman Johnny Donnelly begins a relationship with Sharon. Other secondary characters (Irene, Kamen, Shawn) are introduced throughout the season. Episodes of season 2 include: "Two Guys, a Girl and an Engagement", "Two Guys, a Girl and a Valentine's Day", and "Two Guys, a Girl and Ashley's Return", all of which mark turning points in the story of the show. Johnny and Sharon break up on Valentine's Day due to Sharon's jealousy of Shawn, Johnny's (female) best friend. Berg and Ashley finally get together in "...And Ashley's Return". Pete confesses his feelings towards Sharon, and Johnny proposes in "...And an Engagement". The season ends with Sharon not giving Johnny an answer as well as her realizing she may have feelings for Pete. It left the show with a cliffhanger after ABC had renewed it for another season.

=== Season 3 ===
The pizza place is completely abandoned in the third season so that the characters can pursue different dreams. The premiere resolves the season two cliffhanger, with Sharon answering Johnny's proposal with 'Yes, in theory,' although she is still holding out on her feelings for Pete. Evidently, Pete flies to Paris after the night's events and returns completely over Sharon, with a new girlfriend who speaks only French and is revealed to be extremely racist. Berg and Ashley continue to build on their relationship and finally become doctors involved in psych rotations. The season portrays their relationship as unsteady and completely built on hate of one another. Berg breaks up with Ashley during the middle of the season.

Ashley lives with Pete and Berg before moving into her own apartment, which was originally Sharon's and Johnny's, who move to the basement to become the new supers. She dates Boston Red Sox baseball star Nomar Garciaparra, who appears as himself. Pete finds his true calling by becoming a firefighter. He enjoys the experience of being an honorary firefighter until the feisty Marti, played by Tiffani Thiessen, comes along to thwart him at every turn. The two take shots at each other until she starts dating Berg, to Pete's dislike. Pete and Berg get into a huge fight concerning Marti and consider not being roommates anymore.

When Pete gets his acceptance letter to Fireman Boot Camp, he goes to Marti with open arms and they become an item. Pete continues to hate Berg throughout the final episodes of the season. Sharon and Johnny bicker at one another until Johnny calls off the wedding. When they get back together, they decide that a quickie wedding is the best idea. Irene, Pete's alleged stalker, agrees to throw Sharon and Johnny a wedding on the roof of the building; it results in her inviting Robert Goulet, who conducts the ceremony and brings Pete and Berg back together as friends during the wedding.

At the end of the two-part season finale, Pete and Marti leave to go to Fireman Boot Camp, Sharon, and Johnny go on their honeymoon, and Ashley leaves to sort out a joke that Pete told Nomar, causing his and Ashley's break-up. Berg and Irene are left alone at the wedding and start to dance. The series ends with another cliffhanger as the audience is led to believe something will happen between Berg and Irene. The series was renewed for another season due to its 10.2 million average viewers during season 3.

=== Season 4 ===
In 2001, ABC moved the sitcom from mid-week to Friday and the show's average viewers dropped from 10.2 to 6.7 million. Season 4 continues the story arc from the end of Season 3. Johnny and Sharon are married, Pete and Marti are now firefighters, and Berg and Irene are sleeping together. After Berg gets over being on academic probation, he continues to be Irene's "sex buddy". The two sleep together secretly hoping that Pete won't know.

Johnny continues to be the superintendent until Sharon makes him an honorary fireman for the day on his birthday. Johnny decides that he wants to be a fireman, much to Sharon's dislike. Berg and Irene become a couple and Pete and Marti break up. Marti leaves Pete for Ashley's ex, Nomar. Sharon feels unfulfilled after leaving her evil corporate job and decides that she wants to be a lawyer.

When Berg tells Irene that he loves her and she has no reply, Berg goes out and meets someone else. Katie, the girl he meets, admits she's been following him for 8 years. The two kiss and Berg tells Irene. Berg apologizes and Irene breaks up with him for the mailman Roger. In the final episode, Berg assumes that Irene may be pregnant and decides that he must win her back.

== Series finale ==
The series finale is titled "The Internet Show", and was an episode in which fans of the show voted on the outcome online. The episode aired on May 16, 2001. It was written by Donald Beck and Vince Calandra and directed by Michael Lembeck. In the episode, Sharon thinks she may be pregnant and Ashley realizes she could be too. Ashley goes into denial, despite showing symptoms, but agrees to take a pregnancy test with Sharon. When Berg finds out from a news report that a glow-in-the-dark condom he used was defective he thinks Irene could be pregnant. Not wanting to worry her, he tries to get a urine sample from her without telling her. Pete is still annoyed at Ashley for giving up on their relationship to go to Stanford.

Four different endings were filmed for viewers to decide whether one of the three central female characters (Sharon, Ashley, or Irene) should become pregnant or whether none should be. The plan was to have the pregnant one—which ultimately ended up being Ashley—give birth at the end of the proposed fifth season. However, a fifth season of the show never materialized; by the time the fourth-season finale aired in May 2001, the show had been cancelled due to low ratings.

== Ratings ==
The show had strong ratings success during its run, peaking in season 2 with an average of 12.0 million viewers. The series premiere, titled "The Pilot", was watched by 17.94 million viewers, airing after The Drew Carey Show. The episode got a 15.61 Nielsen rating and won its 18-49 adult demographic. It was ABC's biggest opening since Spin City. The eleventh episode of season 1, "Two Guys, a Girl and How They Met", got a 6.7 Nielsen rating, a big drop from the series premiere. The estimated number of viewers was 7.69 million.

The show continued to have success during the first few seasons but never reached the mark achieved by "The Pilot". Its key adult 18–49 audience was predominantly female (55%). It was ranked #1 in its time period with Total Viewers, outperforming Beverly Hills, 90210, The Nanny, and Dawson's Creek. It was also #1 in its time slot with key adults 18–49 and with all male demographics. It was the #3 sitcom on ABC with key adults 18–34.

Season	Timeslot (EDT)	Season premiere	Season finale	TV season	Rank	Viewers (in millions)
1	Wednesday 8:30 P.M. (March 11, 1998 – July 22, 1998)	March 11, 1998	July 22, 1998	1997–1998	#36	12.9
2	Wednesday 8:30 P.M. (September 23, 1998 – May 26, 1999)	September 23, 1998	May 26, 1999	1998–1999	#44	12.0
3	Wednesday 8:30 P.M. (September 27, 1999 – April 26, 2000)	September 22, 1999	April 26, 2000	1999–2000	#57	10.2
4	Friday 8:00 P.M. (October 6, 2000 – May 16, 2001)	October 6, 2000	May 16, 2001	2000–2001	#104	6.7

== Production notes ==
=== Theme song and opening sequences ===
The title sequence for the first two seasons consists of a short collection of images of the three main characters, and a few cartoon images of them drinking and eating pizza at the pizza place, which alternated with a logo saying Two Guys, a Girl and a Pizza Place. The title screen is accompanied by an instrumental cover of the song "Blister in the Sun" by the Violent Femmes.

The title sequence for Seasons 3 and 4 shows Pete, Berg, and Sharon dancing to a more modern piece of music in front of a plain white backdrop, wearing suits and dresses. The newly adopted logo (the show's name having changed) is seen overlaying the footage as the three dance and laugh.

The music for the series was composed by Freddy Curci, Tom Rizzo and Mark Vogel. The music for Seasons 1 and 2 included numerous variations on the title theme, a prime example of which is "Two Guys, a Girl and a Vacation" where the cast members do a short rendition of "Kokomo" by The Beach Boys. Steel drums and Caribbean instruments were used to vary the title theme within the scenes of the episode.

=== Crew ===
==== Directors ====
- Amanda Bearse
- Robby Benson
- Mark Cendrowski
- Rich Correll
- Dana DeVally Piazza
- John Fortenberry
- Leonard R. Garner Jr.
- Ellen Gittelsohn
- Gordon Hunt
- Casey Johnson
- Gil Junger
- Kim Rozenfeld
- Michael Lembeck
- Gail Mancuso
- Brian K. Roberts
- Wil Shriner
- Andrew Susskind
- Rocco Urbisci
- Ted Wass
- Marjorie Weitzman
- James Widdoes
- David E. Windsor

==== Writers ====
- Kevin Abbott
- Donald R. Beck
- Paige Bernhardt
- Pat Bullard
- Vince Calandra
- Stevie Ray Fromstein
- Mark Ganzel
- Danny Jacobson
- Liz Sagal
- Kenny Schwartz
- Barry Wernick
- Rick Wiener

== Home media ==
On June 24, 2013, Revelation Films released all four seasons on DVD in the UK. On June 28, 2016, Shout! Factory released the series on DVD in the United States.

DVD name	Ep#	Release dates		
DVD name	Ep#	Region 1	Region 2	Region 4
The Complete Season One	13	N/A	April 23, 2012	N/A
The Complete Season Two	22	N/A	August 27, 2012	N/A
The Complete Season Three	24	N/A	November 5, 2012	N/A
The Complete Season Four	22	N/A	February 11, 2013	N/A
The Complete Series	81	June 28, 2016	June 24, 2013	N/A
