= The One (2003 film) =

The One is a television film starring Richard Ruccolo and Meredith Monroe. It premiered on ABC Family in 2003. It was directed by Ron Lagomarsino.

== Plot summary ==
A chef falls in love, but the object of his affections is already engaged, so he does not pursue a relationship. He is hired to cater the couple's wedding, and is torn between seeing his dream girl marry another and realizing his happiness. The movie included Vanessa Carlton's "A Thousand Miles" as a romantic refrain.

== Cast ==
- Richard Ruccolo as Michael Blake
- Meredith Monroe as Gail Hollander
- Gabriel Hogan as Gordie Parks
