= A Nanny for Christmas =

- Film poster
- Directed by: Michael Feifer
- Screenplay by: Michael Ciminera; Richard Gnolfo
- Story by: Michael Ciminera; Richard Gnolfo; Jeffrey Schenck; Peter Sullivan
- Produced by: Michael Feifer; Peter Sullivan
- Starring: Emmanuelle Vaugier; Dean Cain; Richard Ruccolo; Cynthia Gibb; Sierra McCormick
- Cinematography: Carl Bartels
- Edited by: Josh Muscatine; Bryan Roberts
- Music by: Chad Rehmann
- Production companies: ARO Entertainment; Barnholtz Entertainment
- Distributed by: Feifer Worldwide; Starz Media
- Release date: November 23, 2010
- Running time: 90 minutes
- Country: United States
- Language: English

A Nanny for Christmas is a 2010 comedy direct-to-video film, directed by Michael Feifer with a screenplay by Michael Ciminera and Richard Gnolfo. Starring Emmanuelle Vaugier, Dean Cain, Richard Ruccolo, Cynthia Gibb, and Sierra McCormick, the film was released on DVD November 23, 2010.

== Synopsis ==
Ally (Emmanuelle Vaugier) is a smart young career woman who finds herself needing a new job. Samantha (Cynthia Gibb) is a busy Beverly Hills advertising executive/mom who's always too busy to take care of her kids. Danny Donner (Dean Cain) is the tough-guy owner of a chocolate company who wants a major hit ad for his company.

== Cast ==
- Emmanuelle Vaugier as Ally Leeds
- Dean Cain as Danny Donner
- Richard Ruccolo as Justin Larose
- Cynthia Gibb as Samantha Ryland
- Sierra McCormick as Jackie Ryland
- Jared Gilmore as Jonas Ryland
- Sarah Thompson as Tina
- Clyde Kusatsu as Mr. Halligan
- Stewart F. Lane as Mike Edelstein
- Bonnie Comley as Janet Edelstein
- Marla Maples as Brandy
- John Burke as Carl Ryland
- Michael Healey as News Reporter on Radio
- Caia Coley as Carol
- Anna Barnholtz as Kate Edelstein
- Aidan Schenck as Michael Edelstein
- Keith Dobbins as Santa Claus

== Critical reception ==
DVD Verdict found the DVD transfer acceptable, with "fine detail and considerable depth", and solid audio, but found the film itself to be trite and derivative, writing that poor performances, absurd character behavior and horribly-written dialogue made the film "a pretty wretched viewing experience".

Conversely, Movie City News wrote "Only fans of the cast members and made-for-cable rom-coms will find something interesting here, I’m afraid."
