= The Adventures of Brisco County, Jr. =

American television series

- Created by: Jeffrey Boam; Carlton Cuse
- Starring: Bruce Campbell; Julius Carry; Christian Clemenson
- Country of origin: United States
- Original language: English
- No. of seasons: 1
- No. of episodes: 27

Production
- Running time: 45 minutes
- Production companies: Boam/Cuse Productions; Warner Bros. Television

Original release
- Network: Fox
- Release: August 27, 1993 – May 20, 1994

The Adventures of Brisco County, Jr., often referred to as just Brisco or Brisco County, is an American weird western television series created by Jeffrey Boam and Carlton Cuse. It ran for 27 episodes on Fox from August 27, 1993, to May 20, 1994. Set in the American West of 1893, the series follows its title character, a Harvard-educated lawyer-turned-bounty hunter hired by a group of wealthy industrialists to track and capture outlaw John Bly and his gang. Bruce Campbell plays Brisco, who is joined by a colorful group of supporting characters, including Julius Carry as fellow bounty hunter Lord Bowler and Christian Clemenson as stick-in-the-mud lawyer Socrates Poole.

While ostensibly a Western, the series routinely includes elements of the science fiction and steampunk genres. Humor is a large part of the show; the writers attempted to keep the jokes and situations "just under over-the-top". A large number of episodes involve the Orb, a powerful device from the future. John Astin plays Professor Wickwire, an inventor who assists Brisco with anachronistic technology including diving suits, motorcycles, rockets, and airships. The search for new technology and progressive ideas, what the writers of the show called "The Coming Thing", is a central theme throughout the series.

Brisco was developed by Boam and Cuse at the request of Fox executive Bob Greenblatt. Impressed by the duo's work on the script for the 1989 film Indiana Jones and the Last Crusade, Greenblatt suggested they develop a series that bore the tone and style of vintage movie serials. The initial ideas and proposals from the show's writers were more often suited for film than television and had to be scaled down. Brisco was one of the last television shows to be filmed on the Warner Bros. Western backlot. Randy Edelman composed the distinctive theme music, which has been reused by NBC during its coverage of the 1997 World Series and the Olympic Games.

During its broadcast run, The Adventures of Brisco County, Jr. garnered a small but dedicated following and was well received by critics. The series earned high ratings at the beginning of its season, but later episodes failed to attract a substantial number of viewers. Fox canceled the show at the end of its first and only season. In 2006, Warner Home Video released a DVD set containing all 27 episodes. The series has been remembered fondly by critics, who praise its humor and unique blend of genres.

== Plot ==
=== Background ===
The Adventures of Brisco County, Jr., is set in a fictional American Old West of 1893. Robber barons control the financial and industrial interests of the West from the boardrooms of San Francisco's Westerfield Club. The famous U.S. Marshal Brisco County, Sr. (R. Lee Ermey) has apprehended a gang of outlaws and its leader, the notorious John Bly (Billy Drago). While transporting them to stand trial, County is murdered and the gang escapes. Meanwhile, in a nearby mine, a group of shackled Chinese workers unearths "The Orb", a large golden globe studded with rods. A worker draws one of the rods from out of the Orb, then touches several of his co-workers with it. As each worker is touched with the rod he is imbued with superhuman strength which they use to break the iron chains binding them, thus freeing themselves. The murder of Brisco County, Sr., and the discovery of the Orb set into motion the major plots of the series.

=== Synopsis ===
Members of the Westerfield Club hire Brisco County, Jr. (Bruce Campbell), the son of the slain U.S. Marshal, to track and re-capture Bly and his gang. The Westerfield Club's timid lawyer, Socrates Poole (Christian Clemenson) relays instructions and financial support to Brisco. Another bounty hunter, Lord Bowler (Julius Carry), who is known for his expert tracking skills, also hopes to capture Bly. Bitter over the elder County's fame, Bowler treats Brisco as a rival. The two men often find themselves reluctantly joining forces to achieve a common goal. Later in the series, Brisco and Bowler work together as partners and friends.

In the pilot episode, Brisco tracks John Bly's second-in-command, Big Smith (M. C. Gainey). In a battle on a train car, Brisco knocks Smith off the train and into a river; he is assumed dead until he reappears later in the series. Brisco, Bowler and Socrates hunt the rest of Bly's gang in subsequent episodes. All ten of the gang members are captured or killed, and Brisco's pursuit of Bly, who is seeking the Orb for its supernatural power, frequently puts him into contact with the object. Each encounter with the Orb reveals a fantastic effect on people who use it. In the episode "The Orb Scholar", Bly shoots Brisco and leaves him to die. Professor Ogden Coles (Brandon Maggart), a scientist who studies the Orb, heals Brisco with the device. In the episode "Bye Bly", it is revealed that Bly is a fugitive from the distant future who has traveled to 1893 to steal the Orb. Bly plans to use the Orb to travel back to his time and rule the world. Instead, Brisco uses the Orb to travel through time to save Bowler's life. Brisco eventually kills Bly by stabbing him with a rod from the Orb, causing Bly to disintegrate into a pile of ashes. Series creator and executive producer Carlton Cuse said that the Orb represents faith and that depending on the intentions of those who use it, the object rewards or punishes them accordingly.

The pilot episode introduces several characters who make recurring appearances throughout the series. Big Smith's moll Dixie Cousins (Kelly Rutherford) is a saloon singer and con artist who has a brief romantic encounter with Brisco. In later episodes, Dixie becomes Brisco's primary love interest. In his first mission, Brisco also meets Professor Albert Wickwire (John Astin), an eccentric scientist who returns to help many times during the series. Wickwire's ideas and inventions play into Brisco's interest in technology and the future, something Brisco calls "The Coming Thing". Pete Hutter (John Pyper-Ferguson) is a hapless mercenary working for Bly. He has a compulsive attachment to his "piece" (pistol), and given any opportunity will pontificate about topics such as art and philosophy. Pete appears throughout the series as a comic foil to trade barbs with the heroes. He appears to be killed three times during the series, but returns each time with a comic excuse for why he didn't die. The second half of the series includes many episodes with Whip Morgan (Jeff Phillips), a young cardsharp whose attempts to assist Brisco and Bowler often end up causing trouble.

=== Signature show elements ===
The show features classic Western motifs such as train robberies and gunfighter showdowns, in combination with atypical elements. Much of the series is devoted to the science fiction plot surrounding the Orb, and it is this mix of the Western genre with fantasy that has helped Brisco maintain its cult status. In almost every episode, the characters discover or are confronted by what is, for the time, fantastic technology. In the pilot episode, Brisco and Professor Wickwire modify a rocket to run on train tracks. In the episode "Brisco For the Defense", Brisco uses a slide projector to show a trial jury fingerprint evidence. Professor Wickwire returns many times in the series to assist with technology, including tinkering with motorcycles and rescuing the heroes with a helium-filled zeppelin. Campbell told Starlog magazine, "It's kind of Jules Verne meets The Wild Wild West." The presence of futuristic technology in a Victorian era Western places the series in the steampunk genre; it is one of the few such shows to have aired on prime-time television. At least one-third of the show's episodes contain steampunk or Weird West elements. Though "technology-out-of-time" frequently intrudes into the plots of Brisco, the fantastic machines or methods rarely appear again. Some of these out-of-time technologies were archaic renderings of those prevalent in the 20th century, and two film researchers, Cynthia Miller and A. Bowdoin Van Riper, suggest that followers of the show may be puzzled that such inventions, so useful in their own lives, are not exploited further.

According to Cuse, the show was purposely set in 1893, exactly 100 years before the series premiered in 1993. Brisco is meant to be aware of the imminent changes in society and technology and actively looks for them. The writers of the show, and also the character of Brisco, refer to this concept as "The Coming Thing". Elaborating on this theme, Campbell said, "Basically this show is about the turn of the century, when the Old West met the Industrial Era. Cowboys still chew tobacco and ride the range and states are still territories, but over the horizon is the onset of electricity, the first autos and telephones. Brisco is in the middle of a transition from the past to the future." The collision of cowboy characters with puzzling technology and other anachronisms generates humor throughout the series. The writers made it a point to insert scenes mirroring the pop culture of the 20th century, from the apparent invention of the term "UFO" in the pilot episode to the appearance of a sheriff who looks and acts like Elvis Presley. Speaking about the humor of the show, Campbell said, "I would say 30 percent of each episode is being played for laughs. But it's not a winking at the camera, Airplane-type of humor. We're funny like Indiana Jones is funny; the laughs come primarily from the wide variety of ridiculous, colorful characters that come in and out of this series."

== Cast ==
=== Main ===
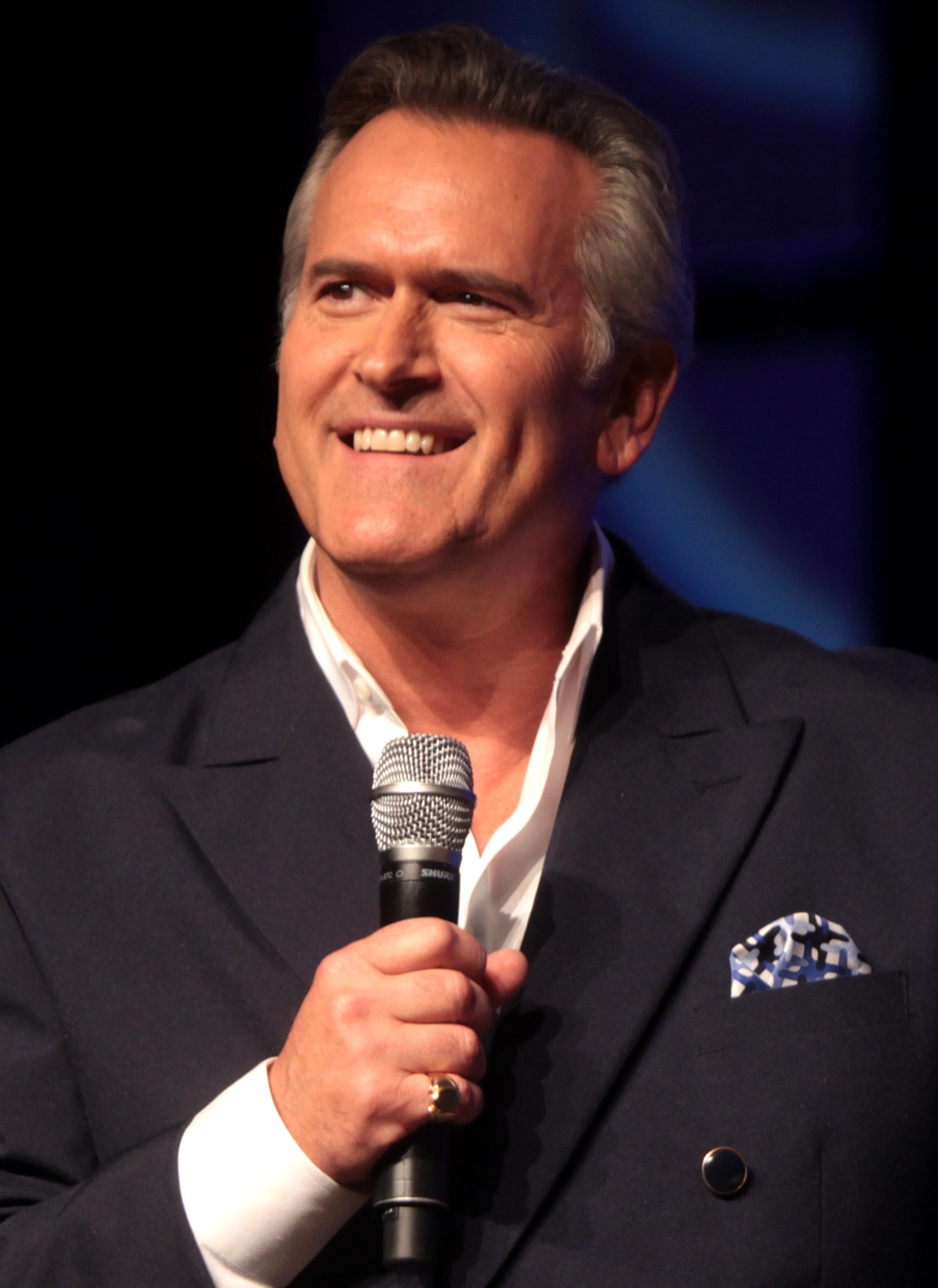
Bruce Campbell portrayed Brisco County, Jr. He auditioned five times before being offered the role.

- Brisco County, Jr., portrayed by Bruce Campbell, a Harvard-educated lawyer-turned-bounty hunter, hired by a group of robber barons to track down notorious outlaw John Bly, who killed County's father, famous lawman Brisco County, Sr. (portrayed in the pilot by R. Lee Ermey). Bruce Campbell went through five auditions for the role of Brisco before he was hired. In his first audition with the casting director, Campbell spontaneously did a standing flip. The stunt impressed the casting director so much that during each subsequent audition, Campbell was asked to do the flip again. In his final audition, Campbell assured the network executives that if hired for the role, he would work hard to make the show a success. In an interview, Campbell said, "It's every actor's dream to play a cowboy, so when this opportunity came up, I mean, yeah, where do I sign?" He added that working on Brisco provided him with acting opportunities he would not have otherwise had. Cuse said getting Campbell "was just one of those collisions between an actor and a script that was just perfect ... I can't imagine Brisco having ever existed without him."
- Socrates Poole, portrayed by Christian Clemenson, a lawyer in the employ of the robber barons who hired County, sent to supervise him. Clemenson went to Harvard with Cuse but still went through the normal audition channels to get the part of Poole. Clemenson was apprehensive about pursuing one of the lead roles in a television show because of the long time commitments involved. He later said, "The similarities between this show and The Wild Wild West, and my character to that show's Artemus Gordon, was an important hook for me. It was one of my favorite shows growing up, and as soon as I saw that Brisco County was based on the same kind of material and attitude as that show, I called my agent and said, 'I'll do anything I have to do to get this.'" Clemenson applied his experiences at Ivy League schools to play the uptight Poole. Praising Clemenson's work on Brisco, Cuse said, "You can't give him anything he's not capable of doing. He adds the voice of intelligence and caution to balance our cast".
- Lord Bowler, portrayed by Julius Carry, an ill-tempered bounty hunter who is a competitor and occasional collaborator with County. The creation was inspired by the Indian tracker "Lord Baltimore" in Butch Cassidy and the Sundance Kid. Carry saw great potential in the character of Bowler. He had researched black cowboys for a project in college and used that knowledge in his portrayal of Bowler. Carry said that Bowler was similar to the real-life black deputy U.S. Marshal Bass Reeves, in that "Reeves always got his man and would often pull off incredible tricks to bring people in." Carry knew Clemenson from the time they worked together on the Western television pilot Independence. He had no knowledge of Campbell, but approved of the choice for the leading man after watching Army of Darkness. He later told Starlog, "I saw that he would be very good with the physical stuff and that he could deliver a one-liner. I knew the situation would be good." The original direction for Bowler was to have him constantly oppose Brisco, but as the series progressed the writers saw the good-natured chemistry between the actors and decided to make Brisco and Bowler a team. Bowler's race was never an issue in the show. According to Cary Darling, a television critic, this attitude is different from serious Westerns and "may hew more to the truth than one might think". He said historians have noted that black cowboys were common and that conflicts with white cowboys were rare.
- Dixie Cousins, portrayed by Kelly Rutherford, a sultry saloon singer and con artist who serves as County's love interest. Rutherford's portrayal of Dixie Cousins, with her emphasis on innuendo and subtext, has been described as "less Miss Kitty (Gunsmoke) than Mae West". Rutherford said that playing Dixie allowed her to fulfill her "fantasy of being Madeline Kahn in Blazing Saddles".

=== Recurring ===
- Professor Albert Wickwire, portrayed by John Astin, an eccentric chemist, physicist, and "experimentalist" who assists County in is adventures and seeks to learn more about the Orb. Astin was best known for his portrayal of Gomez Addams in The Addams Family. Cuse said that he and the writers enjoyed paying homage to the television star of their childhoods: "For us, it was like, 'Oh wow, we get to meet John Astin in the guise of employing him on this show!'"
- John Bly, portrayed by Billy Drago, a flamboyant and psychotic outlaw who turns out to be a fugitive from the distant future who has traveled to 1893 to steal the Orb.
- Peter Hutter, portrayed by John Pyper-Ferguson, one of Bly's henchmen, often serving as a comic foil.

== Production ==
=== Conception and development ===
In 1989, Indiana Jones and the Last Crusade was released in the cinemas. It was a commercial success, earning its producers US$115 million from domestic screenings. The action-packed story, unfolding in a manner reminiscent of Saturday matinee movie serials, about the adventures of an archaeologist was written by Jeffrey Boam, with development and story help from Carlton Cuse; this film was their third collaboration, after Lethal Weapon 2 and 3. According to Cuse, Bob Greenblatt, an executive at Fox Broadcasting Company, engaged him and Boam to develop a television series "because of Indiana Jones and the Last Crusade". Greenblatt wanted a show that had a style similar to the Indiana Jones movies. Cuse started watching old serials and noticed that many fell into two genres: Westerns and science fiction. This gave Boam and Cuse the idea to combine the genres. They decided to emulate the serials' style; for example, each act within an episode begins with a title, usually a pun, and ends with a cliffhanger.

Boam and Cuse did not intend for the series to be historically accurate. Their aim was to create an action-adventure with a modern feel. Cuse told USA Today, "We're not approaching this show as if we were doing a period piece. We see it as a contemporary program. Our characters just happen to be living in the West with 1990s sensibilities. The Indiana Jones movies were period pieces too, but you never thought of them that way." Anachronisms and pop culture references were intentionally inserted into the series. The show was intended to be family friendly, so violence was minimized in favor of having Brisco think his way out of dangerous situations. Boam said, "In the two-hour pilot Brisco doesn't even once have to shoot his gun. Our violence is cartoonish. There is no pain and suffering." Bruce Campbell was prominently featured in advertisements, billboards, and even a trailer shown in movie theaters. When the series was being promoted in the summer of 1993, Fox Entertainment chief Sandy Grushow said that if Campbell "isn't the next big television star, I'll eat my desk".

=== Writing ===
Cuse served as show runner and head writer. Boam, who served as executive producer, also contributed scripts for the show. The writing staff included John Wirth, Brad Kern, Tom Chehak, David Simkins, and John McNamara. They followed Cuse's informal instruction that the tone of the show remain "just under over-the-top": the series would be humorous but not too campy. Every member of the staff participated in breaking down and analyzing the stories they conceived. Worth commented, "there was a very high percentage of ideas that worked in the room and got translated to paper that worked when you put them on film. That doesn't always happen." Cuse described long hours writing the show, including several overnight sessions. Each episode of Brisco was filmed in seven days, so the turn-around time for scripts was one week. McNamara said that he became a "student of TV history" while writing for Brisco, reviewing old episodes of Maverick for inspiration on using humor in the Western genre. He said the writing team felt the television audience was ready for a "trans-genre form", because much of the audience grew up with Lethal Weapon, Star Trek, and The Wild Wild West. Researchers Lynnette Porter and Barry Porter acknowledge the writer's familiarity with Mark Twain's novel Pudd'nhead Wilson. Porter and Porter describe the novel as an "ancestor text", because the characters of Brisco and Bly both refer to it, and say that this type of literary device is used again by Cuse in Lost.

One of the challenges the writers faced was scaling down their ideas to make them feasible for production. Cuse said that he let such ideas flourish because of his relative inexperience with writing for television series. An example given by the writers was Boam's idea for a full-sized "pirate ship on wheels". The writers quickly realized they needed to scale the idea down to something the production designers could create. They settled on putting a full pirate crew on a stagecoach with cannons. Kern said it was better to "shoot past the mark, and come back to it, rather than start below it". He elaborated on this, saying, "if you envision the 40-foot galleon and go back from that, you'll always end up with more than if you start out with a pirate on a horse."

As the series progressed during its broadcast season, the writers received frequent notes and directives from Fox network executives calling for increases and decreases in the science-fiction, comedy and traditional Western elements. Cuse said, "I think we did a particularly good job of maintaining continuity with all the schizophrenic notes we were getting from the network." However, midway through the first season, the writers made a thematic shift from science-fiction to more comedy and adventure. Cuse said, "We were biting off more than we could chew... we were trying to do a comedic action adventure Western, with tongue-in-cheek humor, genuine drama, plus science fiction. All these things added too many elements to serve simultaneously." By the final third of the series, the writers had wrapped up the science-fiction plot with the Orb and focused more on traditional Western motifs.

=== Production design ===
The Adventures of Brisco County, Jr., was filmed primarily on the Warner Bros. soundstages. Town and street scenes were staged on the Western backlot, known as Laramie Street. It was one of the last Western shows to use the backlot. Cuse said that logistics were a problem because so many of the Hollywood Western sets and towns had been torn down by the 1990s. Outdoor scenes were shot on the Warner Bros. ranch in Valencia, California; Bronson Canyon in Los Angeles; and the Valuze Ranch in Santa Clarita, California. Some of the locomotive scenes from Brisco were filmed on location at Railtown 1897 State Historic Park in Jamestown, California. A painting used in the show as a backdrop to create illusions of greater depth perspectives is exhibited at the park.

I was proud of the pilot, when Brisco and Bowler were tied up on the railroad track, and Comet had to come walking up and pull the rope loose and untie them and get them loose... Working a TV series for a trainer of horses is very tough because you don't have any time to prepare for the next show... It was a tough show, but I was very proud of the horses because they worked well, they never held the company up, and everything seemed to work fine.

— Gordon Spencer, head wrangler on The Adventures of Brisco County, Jr.

Comet was portrayed by five horses, each with a different talent. The main horse was Copper, chosen by veteran wrangler Gordon Spencer because it was calm and gentle. Campbell nicknamed the horse "Leadbelly" due to its ability to remain calm during action or dialogue scenes. Another horse, Boss, was used for long-range shots, chase scenes, and elaborate stunts, such as leaps through windows. Ace was called in when the crew had to shoot scenes in which the horse reared. Near the end of the season, a horse named Comet was trained, its name chosen so that the horse would get used to hearing it on set. The "true show horse" was Strip, which was adept at doing tricks, such as lip movements, head nods, and hoof stamping. According to Spencer, all those stunts "as well as tying the knots and opening the door and going into rooms and all of that" were done by Strip. For these scenes, Spencer would stand off-camera and use a stick to signal Strip. Campbell had a special pocket sewn into his costume and filled it with grain to reward Strip after every take. No other horse had more scenes than Strip and Copper. With white colorings on his nose and legs, Strip's appearance was chosen for Brisco's steed; Copper and the other horses were touched up with "clown white" greasepaint to match Strip's markings.

Foley artist Casey Crabtree provided sounds for horse hoof movements, work that was praised by sounds effects industry expert David Yewdall. He said of Crabtree's work on Brisco, "Her horses sounded so natural and real – their hooves, the sound of their hooves on the texture of the ground, the sound of saddle movement, bridle jingles – it was as good as anything I would want for a feature film, and this was episodic television." The make-up on many of Brisco's episodes was done by veteran artist Mel Berns Jr.

Two props of the Orb were made. One of the prop Orbs was used for stunts and had retractable rods. A second version was manufactured from cast bronze, making it heavy: "You really didn't want to have to handle it," Campbell said. The rocket car seen in the pilot episode was built by special effects coordinator Kam Cooney and was a working vehicle with an internal combustion engine and throttle controls. Some items used in the show had been repurposed from older productions, and some would later be used in other shows. For example, the steam locomotive seen in the pilot episode was the same as the one used in Back to the Future Part III. Two of Carry's prop guns – rifles whose barrels were sawed-off in fashion of the Mare's Leg – were later reused in the science fiction television series Firefly.

=== Music ===
Theme from The Adventures of Brisco County, Jr.
A sample from Randy Edelman's theme to Brisco: The theme was also used by NBC in its Olympic coverage.

Stephen Graziano and Velton Ray Bunch composed original music for the series.

Composed by Randy Edelman, the distinctive theme music gained recognition beyond the show's following; in the mid-1990s, NBC Sports had commissioned Edelman to compose theme music for its NFL coverage. At the time, NBC had often used excerpts from film scores as theme music for its sports broadcasts, and had used a portion of Edelman's Gettysburg score for the Breeder's Cup. A portfolio Edelman sent NBC included the Brisco theme, and by 1996 it was being used during coverage of the Olympics; the theme would be retired after the 2016 games. NBC used it again as the theme for their coverage of the MLB postseason in 1996 and 1997. Edelman said, "It was original, and it seemed to have the right spirit. It's got a very flowing melody, it's triumphant, and it has a certain warmth. And it has at the end of it, what all television things like this have, a 'button', an ending flourish that works really well if they need to chop it down into a 15-second thing."

Cary Darling said that the "booming" theme song was "part Magnificent Seven, part Aaron Copland and as grand and wide as 'Big Sky Country' ".

== Broadcast history ==
The Adventures of Brisco County, Jr., premiered on the Fox network at 8:00 pm on Friday, August 27, 1993, with a two-hour pilot movie. To bolster viewer interest in the show, Fox rebroadcast the pilot two days later at 7:00 pm. Both airings of the pilot returned strong ratings. Brisco's ratings for the pilot and first episode were high, particularly with the demographic of adults aged 18–49. The series was aired in Canada, including on Global Toronto (channel 29).

The pilot movie was followed by 26 episodes, each 45 minutes long and airing at 8:00 pm on Fridays. Fox Entertainment chief Sandy Grushaw openly touted Brisco and its star Bruce Campbell. The network fully expected the show to be its breakout hit of the year, a distinction which eventually went to Brisco's follow-up, The X-Files. Hoping that more viewers would follow Brisco as it progressed, Fox approved producing an entire season of the show, despite post-pilot low ratings. Subsequent episodes failed to attract more viewers and the show was cancelled at end of its first and only season. After the series ended, Fox retransmitted the show on Sunday nights at 8:00 pm during July and August 1994. The show was later broadcast for a short time in syndication, airing on the American cable channel TNT.

=== Episodes ===
No.	Title	Directed by	Written by	Original release date	Prod. code	Viewers (millions)
1	"Pilot"	Bryan Spicer	David Simkins & Jeffrey Boam & Carlton Cuse	August 27, 1993	455950	10.4
Two-hour premiere: Marshal Brisco County is killed by John Bly and his (12 strong) gang during their escape from the train transporting them. Brisco County Jr. is hired by "the robber barons" to bring the escaped men to justice. Elsewhere, the Orb is unearthed in a cave. This gives the Chinese indentured servants digging it increased strength, allowing their escape.
2	"The Orb Scholar"	Andy Tennant	Carlton Cuse	September 3, 1993	455953	8.4
Brisco and Lord Bowler both track John Bly to Poker Flats, where Brisco's childhood partner, Deputy Donovan, is sheriff. While there, Brisco meets a man, Professor Coles, who has been studying the Orb for a long time and knows its secrets.
3	"No Man's Land"	Kim Manners	Tom Chehak	September 10, 1993	455954	9.3
Brisco and Professor Wickwire end up in a town inhabited only by women. Elsewhere, Lord Bowler has been hired by Brisco's employers to track down and recover a "mobile battle wagon" (tank) that they had made for the government but was stolen by the Swill Brothers. They also end up in the women-only town.
4	"Brisco in Jalisco"	James A. Contner	Story by : Jeffrey Boam & Carlton Cuse; Teleplay by : Carlton Cuse	September 17, 1993	455956	8.4
Brisco and Socrates Poole go to Jalisco, Mexico, to track down a shipment of stolen guns, and wind up in the middle of a revolution.
5	"Socrates' Sister"	Greg Beeman	Chris Ruppenthal	September 24, 1993	455952	10.9
Brisco captures a suspected member of John Bly's gang, Jack Randolph. While in custody he claims to be a different Jack Randolph and hires Iphigenia Poole, Socrates' sister, to defend him.
6	"Riverboat"	Fred Gerber	John Warren	October 1, 1993	455955	7.5
Brisco tracks Brett Bones, a member of Bly's gang, to New Orleans. While there he attempts to win back the money that Socrates lost to Bones gambling and get justice for another murder Bones committed, despite his friends in high places. In order to get Bones into another jurisdiction, Bowler must take on a professional prize fighter while the riverboat is sailing,
7	"Pirates!"	Daniel Attias	Richard Outten	October 8, 1993	455957	8.9
Blackbeard LaCutte, a member of Bly's gang and a former pirate forced off of the sea, is wreaking havoc on a small town. Brisco and Bowler track him down and attempt to steal back the medicine he stole and capture him.
8	"Senior Spirit"	Michael Lange	John McNamara	October 15, 1993	455958	9.0
Jason Barkley, son of "robber baron" Jebediah Barkley, is kidnapped by John Bly who demands an Orb rod that belonged to Brisco Sr. for his safe return.
9	"Brisco for the Defense"	Andy Tennant	John McNamara & David Simkins	October 22, 1993	455959	8.2
Brisco defends a college friend, Dr. Carter, who is being tried for murder.
10	"Showdown"	Kim Manners	David Simkins	October 29, 1993	455960	9.2
Brisco returns to his childhood home and finds that lawless ranchers have taken over. When he begins to police the town the ranchers hire Utah Johnny Montana to kill Brisco.
11	"Deep in the Heart of Dixie"	Joe Napolitano	Brad Kern & John Wirth	November 5, 1993	455961	9.4
Dixie Cousins is involved in an early test of audio recording and records a sensitive conversation with a politician. Instead of placing herself in danger by testifying, she flees, and it's up to Brisco to bring her back.
12	"Crystal Hawks"	Win Phelps	Carlton Cuse & John McNamara	November 12, 1993	455962	9.9
Brisco is framed for a murder and suddenly finds himself running from his fellow bounty hunters. Female bounty hunter Crystal Hawks is hot on his trail as Brisco tries to clear his name and find out what all of this has to do with the Orb.
13	"Steel Horses"	Kim Manners	Tom Chehak	November 19, 1993	455963	8.9
Juno Dawkins, a member of Bly's gang, steals "the coming thing" in transportation — motorized steel horses (motorcycles) — to aid them in a stagecoach robbery for the Orb. Brisco and Bowler, with help from Prof. Wickwire, must get back the "steel horses" and stop the stagecoach robbery from taking place.
14	"Mail Order Brides"	Michael Shultz	Story by : Tom Chehak; Teleplay by : David Simkins & John Wirth	December 10, 1993	455964	9.5
Brisco and Bowler run into three women from the East coast who are headed for a small western town as "mail-order brides". However, on their journey westward the Swill Brothers attacked them and stole their dowries, without which no man will take them. Brisco and Bowler volunteer to track down the Swills and get the dowries back for the ladies.
15	"A.K.A. Kansas"	Rob Bowman	Story by : Carlton Cuse; Teleplay by : Brad Kern & John McNamara	December 17, 1993	455965	8.6
Doc McCoy, a member of Bly's Gang and Dixie Cousins' ex-husband, attempts to steal a "super cannon" which can precisely drop knockout gas from a distance so he can use it to steal the Orb from the facility where it is being stored.
16	"Bounty Hunters' Convention"	Kim Manners	James L. Novack	January 7, 1994	455966	9.0
A number of bounty hunters, including Brisco and Bowler, are invited to a convention on a small island. Upon arrival the bounty hunters all begin mysteriously dying one by one and it's up to Brisco to figure out why and at whose hand.
17	"Fountain of Youth"	Michael Caffey	Kathryn Baker	January 14, 1994	455967	8.6
Brisco and Bowler are contacted by Professor Coles who asks them to come find him. Instead of Coles they find his daughter Lillian, who says she too was asked to come, but can't find her father. Brisco, Bowler and Lillian attempt to track down Professor Coles and find themselves tangled up with members of Bly's Gang in a fight for the Orb.
18	"Hard Rock"	Joseph L. Scanlan	John McNamara	February 4, 1994	455969	10.1
Brisco and Bowler ride into Hard Rock, the town Bowler grew up in. While there they meet Sheriff Viva and try to help him stop Roy Hondo, a member of Bly's gang who has been running a protection racket. They also meet Whip Morgan who attempts to "call out" Hondo.
19	"Brooklyn Dodgers"	Kim Manners	Donald Marcus	February 11, 1994	455968	9.9
Brisco and Bowler run into two orphans who are on their way to San Francisco to claim an inheritance before the leader of their orphanage can claim it. At the same time members of the New York Irish Mob begin hunting the children in hopes of claiming the inheritance.
20	"Bye Bly"	Kim Manners	Carlton Cuse	February 18, 1994	455970	N/A
Brisco and Bowler are tracking down the last member of Bly's gang, Pepe Bendix, but lose him in an alley when the US Government saves him under the condition that he will steal the Orb for them. Later, a naked time traveler named Karina appears in Brisco's room while he's sleeping and informs him of the supernatural nature of the Orb. She convinces Brisco to track it down and kill Bly once and for all. Eventually, Brisco kills Bly by stabbing him with one of the Orb's rods and Bly disintegrates into a pile of ashes.
21	"Ned Zed"	Bryan Spicer	Jeffrey Boam	March 11, 1994	455951	7.7
A man reads his son a Brisco County, Jr. dime novel which recaps his dealings with the notorious, mouthy, bank-robbing member of Bly's gang named Ned Zed with his "machinery gun", and Frenchy Bearpaux who still holds a grudge over what Brisco County, Sr. did to him.
22	"Stagecoach"	Felix Enriquez Alcala	Jeffrey Vlaming	April 1, 1994	455971	7.3
Brisco must escort a spy to the Mexican border where a prisoner trade is to take place, who unbeknownst to him is in danger from a high-ranking government official who is attempting to incite a war.
23	"Wild Card"	Larry Shaw	Brad Kern & John Wirth	April 8, 1994	455972	8.5
Dixie Cousins' sister Dolly is cheated out of her casino in Reno. She enlists the help of Whip Morgan to win it back, but he too is cheated. Meanwhile, a money truck Brisco and Bowler are escorting to Reno is robbed. Brisco, Bowler, Whip, Dixie and Dolly all join forces to get back Dolly's casino and drive out the mob element that is sprouting up in Reno.
24	"And Baby Makes Three"	Kevin S. Bright	Tracy Friedman	April 22, 1994	455973	9.1
Pete Hutter has been contracted by the "Black Lotus" clan to steal a baby. After doing so they back out of their agreed-upon payment and Hutter, in a panic, drops the baby off with Dixie. It's up to Brisco, Bowler, Dixie and Whip to keep the baby safe and return him to his rightful home.
25	"Bad Luck Betty"	Joseph L. Scanlan	Tony Blake & Paul Jackson	April 29, 1994	455974	8.9
Socrates is kidnapped from his birthday celebration and Brisco, Bowler and Whip track his kidnappers to "Midnightville". While looking for Socrates the guys find themselves in the midst of a lot of creepy goings-on.
26	"High Treason Part I"	Kim Manners	Story by : Tom Chehak & John Wirth; Teleplay by : Carlton Cuse & Brad Kern	May 13, 1994	455975	7.2
Brisco and Bowler are accused of high treason and brought before a court-martial to determine their guilt.
27	"High Treason Part II"	Joseph L. Scanlan	Story by : Carlton Cuse & Brad Kern; Teleplay by : Tom Chehak & John Wirth	May 20, 1994	455976	7.2
Brisco and Bowler escape their fate and go on a quest to prove, once and for all, their innocence.

=== Cancellation ===
As the season progressed, the ratings declined, greatly hurting the show's chances of being renewed. Writer John McNamara partially blamed Brisco's low ratings on its Friday 8:00 p.m. time slot. He said not many people watch television at that time, so "fighting for numbers" then was "like being stuck on Normandy beach". Grushaw acknowledged the high quality of the show and the vocal support from its small fan base. "Obviously the viewers are very passionate about the show... and when you read some of the things they have to say, it gives you real pause", Grushaw told USA Today in 1994. By May of that year, Grushaw said renewing Brisco was a 50–50 call. At the end of its season, Brisco was one of the lowest rated shows of the year, and Fox confirmed its cancellation in June.

Brisco's writers were planning for another season before the show's cancellation. They had not penned the ending of the first season as a finale for the series and had broad ideas for the second season, which would have featured Brisco settling in as the sheriff of a small town. In his autobiography, Campbell mused, "To explain why a TV show is canceled is almost impossible. Ironically Brisco, with its off-kilter humor, wouldn't have been developed on any other network, yet the appeal of 'Westerns' was still rural – not the side Fox's urban bread was buttered on."

Writer and supervising producer Brad Kern reflected on the show's cancellation, saying, "Ten years later, everybody you talk to... they all love the show. I think that was the biggest disappointment about the show not coming back. We knew we were doing something special." Told of the show's success in the TV Guide "Save Our Shows" poll, Sandy Grushow said, "Obviously I'm happy and not entirely surprised", but added, "You can't dismiss a season's worth of ratings." Kim Manners, director on nearly a third of the Brisco episodes, said working on the series gave him an opportunity to grow creatively. He told writer Joe Nazzaro, "It really woke me up as a director, almost spiritually", and that directing for Brisco was a large contributing factor to his success as a regular director on The X-Files. Manners said, "When they didn't give it a second year, I was devastated", adding that he wished Cuse would have made a feature film based on Brisco. Considering the show's short life, Cuse later commented, "If the show could have survived into a second season, I think it could have ended up running for actually a long time. Some shows just sort of fall through the cracks in the right away and they kind of stay on the air long enough to aggregate an audience. I think if circumstances had been different, Brisco could have had a much longer life." Cuse also said the Friday night time slot hurt Brisco's chances of building an audience, saying, "We were on at 8 p.m. on Friday night, which is sort of a death slot – I mean people do still go bowling – few shows have succeeded in that slot."

== Home media ==
In 2005, Kirthana Ramisetti of Entertainment Weekly posted that The Adventures of Brisco County, Jr., deserved to be released on DVD. Gord Lacey, the creator of the website TVShowsonDVD.com, told the New York Daily News that Brisco was among the five most requested shows on the site. Lacey spent several years lobbying industry contacts to get Brisco released on DVD. This led to correspondence with Cuse, who also wanted to get a DVD set produced. On July 18, 2006, Warner Home Video released The Adventures of Brisco County, Jr.: The Complete Series on DVD in Region 1, an 8-disc DVD set that contains all 27 episodes of the series. The release includes commentary tracks from Campbell and Cuse; an interactive menu of Brisco's signature references narrated by Campbell; The History of Brisco County, Jr., documentary; a feature called A Reading from the Book of Bruce; and another gallery hosted by Campbell focusing on the gadgets from the show.

== Reception ==
=== Pilot episode ===
In July 1993, Brisco's two-hour pilot was screened for television critics in Los Angeles. Initial critical reaction to the pilot was positive and focused on the humor and the science fiction plot points. USA Today's Matt Roush enjoyed the campy humor and the cast of the show, saying it worked on many levels and would "please all but the family curmudgeon". Calling Brisco "one of the best shows of the fall season", Jennifer Stevenson of the St. Petersburg Times praised the show's "intelligent, satirical asides". Kay Gardella wrote in the New York Daily News that the pilot set itself "apart from others of genre" with its humorous script and sight gags. The Los Angeles Times called Brisco "gratifying nonsense", and praised Campbell and the supporting cast for supplying humor without "going over the top". Some critics, such as Walter Goodman of The New York Times and David Hiltbrand of People, found the supporting characters "weakly cast" and not as strong as Campbell in the lead. Other reviewers praised the overall look of the show, such as Todd Everett of Variety, who approved of the "strong comic-book visual style" and the pilot's high production values. Writing in The Washington Post, Tom Shales said that the pilot's production was "more movielike than serieslike".

The pilot's science-fiction plot elements were appreciated by New York magazine, which wrote favorably about the "millenarianism" of the show, including Brisco's use of a rocket to travel on railroad tracks. While Rod Dreher of the Washington Times liked the "nifty" Orb subplot, some critics responded negatively to the Orb. The Washington Post's Shales called the Orb "hokey supernatural bunk". Other reviewers complained generally about the broad mix of genres and number of subplots in the pilot. While TV Guide's Jeff Jarvis roundly praised the quality of the pilot and called Brisco his favorite Fox show of 1993, he criticized the pilot for being "padded with outlaws and mysterious orbs". Diane Werts of Newsday similarly said that Brisco "just about hits the bulls eye" with its "sharp wit" and "thrill a minute" action, although she noted that the pilot was over-packed with characters and subplots. Writing in The New York Times, Goodman said, "The writers try everything, including some business involving raiders of a lost orb, without much of a payoff."

Entertainment Weekly's Ken Tucker enjoyed the "nervy attempt to do something different with the TV Western" in the pilot and said that "Brisco County is less a satire of the Western's cliches than a revitalization of them." Writing in the Toronto Star, Greg Quill said that the pilot introduced Brisco as "a western in the loosest use of the term". Quill noted that the pilot includes "every cliche in the western movie arsenal", but that "everything, from characters to plot turns, is skewed away from the norm", and that the pilot episode rose above the level of western spoof to become an "outrageously confident tribute to... the best of the genre".

=== Broadcast run ===
During the broadcast run of The Adventures of Brisco County, Jr., TV Guide featured a positive review of the show in its Couch Critic column and wrote, "It's as funny as it is exciting, which is not an easy combo to pull off... it's fresh and funny and different, and that's why we like it." The magazine twice listed Brisco as a family-friendly TV program: "Back when some of us grew up, Westerns were synonymous with great family entertainment, but – let's be honest – some of them were dull as dust. Not this one. Brisco is a Western with a sense of humor, filled with impish action for kids and adults."

The Wall Street Journal reviewed a host of Westerns from 1992 and 1993 and said that Brisco was "the most sheer fun of the bunch", calling it "a period piece with slick production values and a mix of drama and humor, fast pace and high camp". In an article on the 1993 television season, the Toronto Star's Greg Quill wrote that Brisco was a program that represented "American TV craft at the top of its form". In contrast, Elvis Mitchell of Spin magazine gave Brisco a scathing review, calling the show's premise a "tedious... rickety gimmick". Mitchell acknowledged the show's "quick reflexes", but said the humor was "uncomfortable" with a "cynical quickness". He added, "Brisco County relieves us of the burden of laughing. It spends too much time looking at itself in the mirror, admiring its own adorable dimpled half-smile."

Viewership figures for Brisco fell as its season progressed and in 1994, it was listed in TV Guide's annual "Save Our Shows" article. Readers were requested to write in and vote to save one of the four listed shows – one from each television network – that were in danger of being cancelled. The Adventures of Brisco County, Jr., won with 34.7 percent of the 72,000 votes cast. Cuse said the vote "reaffirms for me a feeling I've had – namely that the Nielsens aren't accurately reflecting people's interest in this show", adding that, given Fox's then relatively small share of the market, it was notable that the show got more votes than any of the programs from NBC, CBS, and ABC.

Writing in USA Today, Matt Roush encouraged readers to watch the low-rated show, saying that families should watch it rather than "that interchangeable T.G.I.F. tripe". He said, "Brisco is mighty lavish but even more mightily loony, happily saddled with broad sight gags and tortured puns." Bruce Fretts of Entertainment Weekly speculated that mainstream success eluded the show because of its mixing of genres. He said, "Brisco refuses to behave like a normal Western, mixing in sci-fi, slapstick, and... kung fu." Chicago Tribune's Scott Williams praised Brisco for its "strong supporting cast" and "superb physical comedy and crisp dialogue". He said the show should have been a hit, but that the Friday night time slot hampered its ratings.

=== Level of violence ===
Brisco was criticized early on for the violence it portrayed; meant to be comical, a scene in the pilot in which four villains accidentally kill each other in a crossfire troubled critics instead. Cuse insisted that the show was still appropriate for children, saying, "I think we're very conscious of violence and I think we've made an effort to avoid violence in the pilot and in the future episodes". Halfway through the season, U.S. Senator Byron Dorgan singled out Brisco as the most violent show on television based on a study at Minnesota's Concordia University, in which students watched 132 hours of network and cable programming, during the week of September 28 to October 4, 1993. The students tallied each act of violence, and found that Brisco had 117 violent acts per hour. The study deemed Brisco more violent than the film Beverly Hills Cop, which was also viewed for the study. Cuse called the criticism "patently ridiculous", noting that only one episode of the show was viewed, in which a boxing match takes place. Each punch and jab was counted as an act of violence. Cuse spoke out against legislation to curb television violence, saying that politicians were "chasing a false objective". He said it was the job of a show's producer to control the moral content of a television program and the parents' duty to monitor what their children watch.

The Los Angeles Times printed a story about Senator Dorgan's efforts to elicit a response from the Federal Communications Commission (FCC) with the title "Fox Tops Tally of Violence on Major TV Networks Media: Study of a week of prime-time shows also lists 'Brisco County' as bloodiest series. Senator wants FCC to issue report card, name sponsors". Cuse responded by writing a letter to the editor. In the letter, entitled "'Brisco County' Is a Family-Oriented Series", Cuse objected to the newspaper story title labeling Brisco as the "bloodiest series". He said that Senator Dorgan's press release did not mention blood and that the show's violence should be viewed in context. Cuse added the show had been listed as family friendly in other publications, and that he read every viewer letter sent regarding the show. "The overwhelming majority praise "Brisco County" for being a show that the entire family can watch together. After 15 original airings, I have not received one single letter criticizing the show on the grounds of violence or violent content." When the US Senate discussed forcing broadcast and cable networks to regulate violent programming, Cuse said that self-regulation within the industry was a positive move. As he operated on his "own internal moral principles", the measures would not affect his week-to-week work.

=== Post-cancellation ===
Writing in People magazine in 1995, Craig Tomashoff said the cancellation of Brisco was "one of the tragedies going into [the 1994–1995] TV season". Tomashoff suggested that the show influenced UPN's Legend, another Western series with comedy and science fiction elements. Reflecting on the show in the Orange County Register in 1996, critic Cary Darling lamented Brisco's cancellation, saying that the show "stood way out from the rest of the broadcast pack". Darling reviewed the show, describing it as "a witty, multiracial Western that tempered its fisticuffs with fantasy, its innocence with irony, and its romantic vision of the Old West with an abiding New World faith in the future's infinite possibilities". Writing in Entertainment Weekly, Ken Tucker called the show a "one season wonder" that was "ahead of its time".

When the series was released on DVD, critics remembered it fondly. Video Librarian called Brisco "criminally short-lived" and "wildly entertaining". Ken Tucker of Entertainment Weekly gave the series an "A−", calling the show "smart-alecky and witty, suspenseful and absurd". IGN DVD called the DVD set "impressive" and said that the series was "a satisfying show that hits its mark". Auxiliary Magazine called Brisco "one of the greatest sci-fi/Western epics in television history" and compared it favorably to the more well-known sci-fi/Western shows, Firefly and The Wild Wild West. In its 2006 gift guide, the Christian Science Monitor gave Brisco a positive review, saying, "Folks, there are so few comic sci-fi/Westerns, they should be celebrated, not canceled prematurely."

In a 2018 interview with Houston Chronicle, Bruce Campbell voiced an interest in reviving the series. "I would actually be willing to do a Brisco revisited".
