= Julius Carry =

American actor (1952–2008)

- Carry at San Diego Comic-Con, July 2006
- Born: Julius John Carry III; March 12, 1952; Chicago, Illinois, U.S.
- Died: August 19, 2008 (aged 56); Los Angeles, California
- Occupation: Actor
- Years active: 1973–2006
- Spouse: Naomi Carry
- Parent: Helen Carry

Julius John Carry III (March 12, 1952 – August 19, 2008) was an American actor. He made his acting debut in the 1979 film Disco Godfather starring Rudy Ray Moore. He played Sho'Nuff in the martial arts film The Last Dragon. He also acted in the films World Gone Wild and The Fish That Saved Pittsburgh.

Carry appeared primarily in numerous television roles, including Dr. Abraham Butterfield on Doctor, Doctor and the bounty hunter Lord Bowler in The Adventures of Brisco County, Jr. He also appeared on shows such as It's a Living (as the boyfriend/husband of Sheryl Lee Ralph), Murphy Brown, Family Matters, A Different World, Two Guys, a Girl and a Pizza Place, and Boy Meets World.

== Early life and education ==
Carry grew up in the Lake Meadows neighborhood of Chicago, Illinois. Carry attended Hales Franciscan High School, where, at age 15, he joined the Spartan Players, an acting group. He discovered a love of acting with the group, performing in plays such as Hamlet and West Side Story. After touring the country with the Spartan Players, Carry joined the Chicago Actors Repertory Company, performing with them for four years. Afterwards, Carry stayed in Chicago, "basically getting into no good", he told writer Marc Shapiro. He attended Quincy College, but only for one year. His family encouraged him to move to Los Angeles to live with his uncle and "get back on [his] feet." Once in Los Angeles, Carry entered Loyola Marymount University, where he received a bachelor's degree in film and TV production. He stayed at the university, and completed a master's degree in communication arts.

== Career ==
In the TV series The Adventures of Brisco County, Jr. with Bruce Campbell, which aired in 1993 and 1994, Carry played the part of Brisco's one-time rival and fellow bounty hunter Lord Bowler (a.k.a. James Lonefeather), who then became Brisco's best friend and sidekick. Carry also portrayed the main villain Sho'nuff in the film The Last Dragon. Carry's final appearance as an actor was in the season one episode "Eating The Young" on the CBS series The Unit in 2006. He had also guest starred on three episodes of the ABC/Disney sitcom Boy Meets World, once as a college professor and later as Sgt. Alvin Moore, father of series regular Angela Moore (Trina McGee). As a result of Carry's death, the character of Sgt. Moore is revealed to have died as well (off-screen) in the years between Boy Meets World and the second season of its sequel series Girl Meets World, which aired on Disney Channel.

== Personal life and death ==
Carry's family included Ronald, his brother, and Helen, his mother, who is a minister with the Christ Universal Temple in Chicago. He married twice; his second wife was Naomi Carry.

Carry died from pancreatic cancer at his home in Studio City, Los Angeles, on August 19, 2008, at the age of 56.

== Filmography ==
=== Film ===
| Year | Title | Role | Notes |
|---|---|---|---|
| 2006 | The 12th Man | Sonny | TV movie |
| 2002 | The New Guy | Coach | |
| 2000 | Schimmel | Doctor | TV movie |
| 1989 | Perry Mason: The Case of the All-Star Assassin | Temple Brown | TV movie |
| 1989 | Jake Spanner, Private Eye | Lenny | TV movie |
| 1988 | Police Story: Monster Manor | Aaron | TV movie |
| 1988 | Why on Earth? | Julius J Carry Bill | TV movie |
| 1988 | Moving | Coach Wilcox | |
| 1987 | World Gone Wild | Nitro | |
| 1985 | The Man with One Red Shoe | CIA Agent | |
| 1985 | The Last Dragon | Sho'nuff / The Shogun of Harlem | |
| 1984 | Goldie and the Bears | Walker Johnson | TV movie |
| 1979 | The Fish That Saved Pittsburgh | Malik Jamal Truth | |
| 1979 | Disco Godfather | Bucky | |

=== Television ===
| Year | Title | Role | Notes |
|---|---|---|---|
| 2006 | The Unit | Colonel George | 1 episode |
| 2003 | Half & Half | Earl | 1 episode |
| 2003 | Columbo | Policeman | Episode: "Columbo Likes the Nightlife" |
| 2002 | The Hughleys | Marcos | 1 episode |
| 2002 | Do Over | Principal Glen Rudd | 4 episodes |
| 2001 | Nikki | Frank Schisler | 1 episode |
| 2001 | Men, Women & Dogs | Stan | 1 episode |
| 2001 | Diagnosis Murder | Roger Calender | 1 episode |
| 2001–04 | JAG | Maj. Gen. Paul Spinoza / Alton Foreland | 2 episodes |
| 2001–02 | The District | Reverend Garvey | 4 episodes |
| 2000 | Strong Medicine | Art Lewis | 1 episode |
| 1999 | Spin City | Nick Mitchell | 1 episode |
| 1999 | Moesha | Mr. Filmore | 1 episode |
| 1999 | Grown Ups | Mr. Richmond | 1 episode |
| 1998 | Two Guys, a Girl and a Pizza Place | Bill | 13 episodes |
| 1997 | Caroline in the City | Reggie | 1 episode |
| 1997–2000 | Boy Meets World | Sergeant Moore / Professor Michaels | 3 episodes |
| 1997–98 | Cosby | Robert / Bradshaw | 2 episodes |
| 1995 | Misery Loves Company | Perry | 8 episodes |
| 1995–96 | Maybe This Time | Brock | 2 episodes |
| 1994 | Grace Under Fire | Ted Larkin | 1 episode |
| 1994 | Empty Nest | Bo | 1 episode |
| 1994 | Earth 2 | Les Firestein | 1 episode |
| 1993 | Tales from the Crypt | Detective Connors | 1 episode |
| 1993 | Murder, She Wrote | Sergeant Bill Davis | 1 episode |
| 1993 | Dinosaurs | Mudbelly | 1 episode |
| 1993 | Cutters | Troy King | 5 episodes |
| 1993–94 | The Adventures of Brisco County, Jr. | Lord Bowler | 27 episodes |
| 1992 | Family Matters | Oscar | 1 episode |
| 1992–96 | Murphy Brown | Mitchell Baldwin | 5 episodes |
| 1991 | A Different World | Larry Beaujolais | 1 episode |
| 1989–91 | Doctor Doctor | Dr. Abe Butterfield | 40 episodes |
| 1988 | Tanner '88 | Secret Serviceman | 1 episode |
| 1988–89 | It's a Living | Reggie St. Thomas | 2 episodes |
| 1988–89 | Duet | Luke | 2 episodes |
| 1987 | Moonlighting | Inmate | 1 episode |
| 1987 | Fame | Billy Waters | 1 episode |
| 1986–89 | 227 | Dale Evans / Franklin 'Rocketman' Garvard | 3 episodes |
| 1986–87 | The New Leave It to Beaver | Don St. Don / Don St. John | 2 episodes |
| 1985 | Misfits of Science | Odor Williams | 1 episode |
| 1985 | The Jeffersons | Bobby | 1 episode |
| 1985 | The A-Team | Mussaf | 1 episode |
| 1985 | E/R | Bill Ford | 1 episode |
| 1983 | Newhart | Celtic | 1 episode |
| 1983 | Bay City Blues | Willie Henderson | 2 episodes |
| 1983 | Alice | Customer #3 | 1 episode |
| 1982 | Hill Street Blues | Cab Customer | 1 episode |
| 1982 | Benson | Zeke Webster, an ex-con | 1 episode |
| 1980 | The White Shadow | Basketball Player | 1 episode |
