= Richard Ruccolo =

American television and film actor (born 1972)

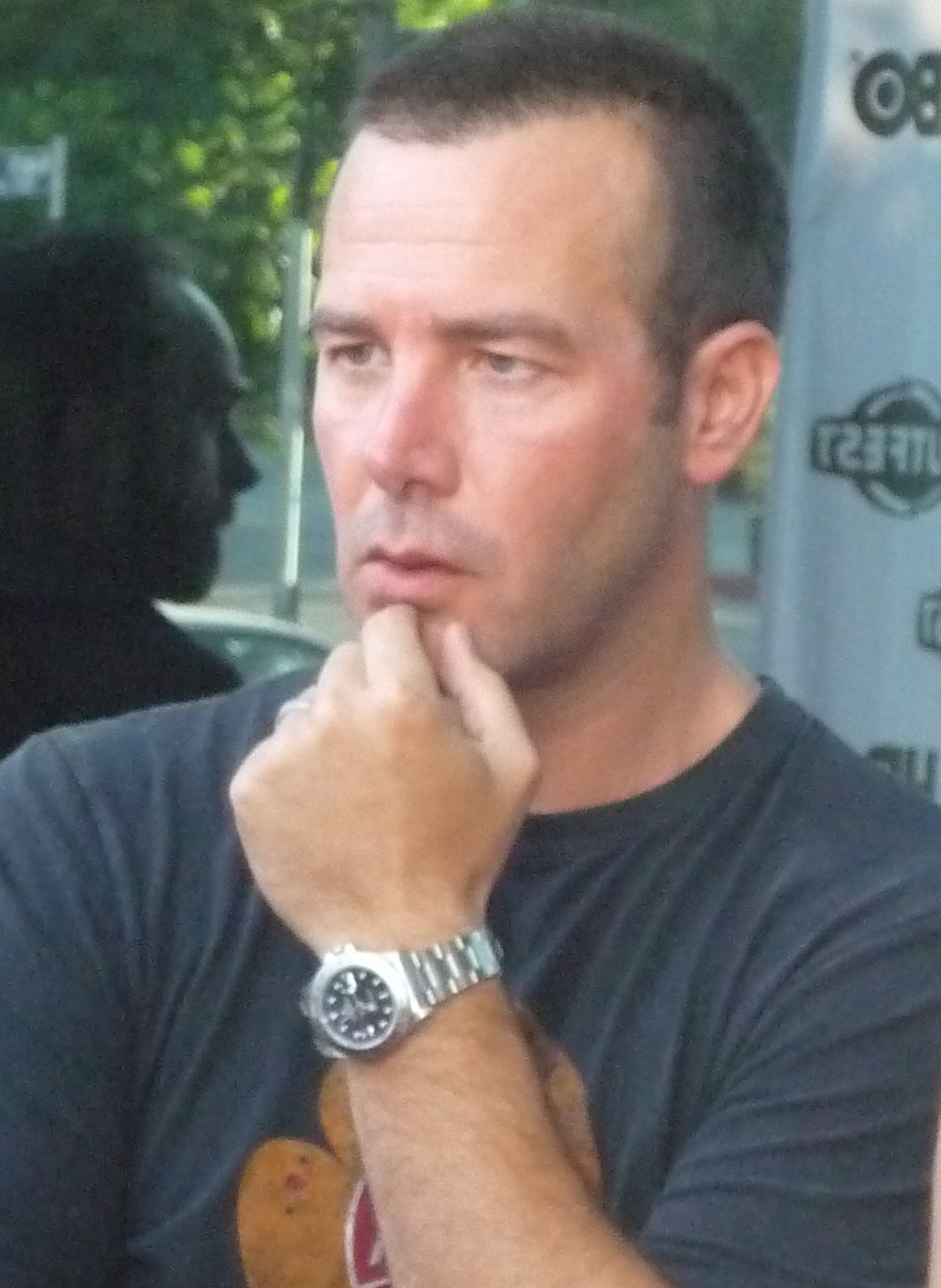
- Born: Richard Robert Ruccolo; March 2, 1972 (age 54); Marlton, New Jersey, U.S.
- Other name: Rich Ruccolo
- Occupation: Actor
- Years active: 1997–present
- Spouse: Lauren Ruccolo (m. 2008)

Richard Robert Ruccolo (born March 2, 1972) is an American television and film actor, best known for his lead role in the sitcom Two Guys and a Girl (originally titled Two Guys, a Girl and a Pizza Place).

== Early life ==
Ruccolo was born in Marlton, New Jersey. He attended Cherokee High School in Evesham Township, New Jersey. It was there Ruccolo first discovered his love of acting while starring as the lead in the high school's production of Oklahoma! After graduating he moved to Los Angeles to find work as an actor. Throughout his auditions, Ruccolo slept on a friend's sofa until he found work.

== Career ==
Gradually Ruccolo began to find guest roles in such dramas as Beverly Hills, 90210 and The X-Files. He starred in nationally televised commercials for Wendy's, Skittles and 7 Up. However, it was not until 1998 that Ruccolo became recognized. Ruccolo found fame as Pete Dunville in the sitcom Two Guys and a Girl. When the series was canceled in 2001, Ruccolo starred in All Over the Guy, The One, Missing in the USA, and Anacardium. In 2005, he guest starred in three episodes of Joey as Glen.

In 2008 and 2010, Ruccolo starred in the Lifetime sitcom Rita Rocks.

== Personal life ==
Ruccolo was once engaged to former Saved by the Bell star Tiffani Thiessen. They met in 2000 when Thiessen guest starred in several episodes of Two Guys and a Girl. Their relationship ended in March 2003. In 2008, he married Lauren Rees.

== Filmography ==
=== Film ===
| Year | Title | Role | Notes |
|---|---|---|---|
| 1998 | Music from Another Room | Nick | |
| 2000 | Luck of the Draw | Jedd | |
| 2001 | All Over the Guy | Tom | |
| 2001 | Deranged (Anacardium) | Chris | |
| 2006 | Available Men | Rob | Short film |
| 2009 | Obsessed | Hank | |
| 2010 | A Nanny for Christmas | Justin Larose | Direct-to-video |
| 2012 | Playdate | Brian Valentine | |

=== Television ===
| Year | Title | Role | Notes |
|---|---|---|---|
| 1997 | Beverly Hills, 90210 | Dean | Episode: "Straight Shooter" |
| 1998–2001 | Two Guys, a Girl and a Pizza Place | Pete Dunville | Main role |
| 1999 | The X-Files | Agent Peyton Ritter | Episode: "Tithonus" |
| 2003 | Spellbound | | NBC TV-Pilot |
| 2003 | The One | Michael Blake | ABC Family TV-Movie |
| 2003 | Less than Perfect | Bobby Casey | Episode: "A Little Love For Lydia" |
| 2003 | The Brotherhood of Poland, New Hampshire | Charlie Babbot | Episodes: "Secrets and Lies" and "Tough Love" |
| 2004 | Missing in the USA | Host | |
| 2004 | Taste | Danny Coyle | CBS TV-Pilot |
| 2005 | Talk Show Diaries | Blake | UPN TV-Pilot |
| 2005 | Joey | Glen | Episodes: "Joey and the Assistant", "Joey and the Fancy Sister", and "Joey and the Spying" |
| 2005 | Reba | Dr. Beck | Episode: "Issues" |
| 2006 | Standoff | Ken Mund | Episode: "Man of Steele" |
| 2007 | Backyards & Bullets | | NBC TV-Pilot |
| 2007, 2012 | It's Always Sunny in Philadelphia | Corporate Rep | Episodes: "The Gang Sells Out" and "The Gang Recycles Their Trash" |
| 2008–2009 | Rita Rocks | Jay Clemens | 40 episodes |
| 2011 | Desperate Housewives | Scott | Episode: "The Art Of Making Art" |
| 2013 | Wendell & Vinnie | Allan Kramer | Episodes: "Abra & Cadabra" and "Wendell and the Sleepover" |
| 2013–2014 | Crash & Bernstein | Karl Bernstein | 3 episodes |
| 2013–2014 | Legit | Mike Mert | 6 episodes |
| 2014 | Hot in Cleveland | Matt | Episode: "Rusty Banks Rides Again" |
| 2014 | Devious Maids | Kim Rampton | Episode: "The Bad Seed" |
| 2014 | NCIS | Ronald Troutman | Episode: "Page Not Found" |
| 2015 | Take It from Us | Lucas | TV movie |
| 2016 | I Know Where Lizzie Is | Martin Holden | TV movie |
| 2016 | Internity | Owen Sieber | Episode: "Pilot" |
