= 2005 United States elections =

- ← 2003 2004 2005 2006 2007 → Off-year elections
- Election day: November 8

Congressional special elections
- Seats contested: 3
- Net seat change: 0

Gubernatorial elections
- Seats contested: 3 (2 states, 1 territory)
- Net seat change: 0
- 2005 gubernatorial election results map

Legend
- Democratic hold Covenant gain No election

Elections were held in the United States on November 8, 2005. During this off-year election, the only seats up for election in the United States Congress were special elections held throughout the year. None of these congressional seats changed party hands. There were also two gubernatorial races, state legislative elections in two states, numerous citizen initiatives, mayoral races in several major cities, and a variety of local offices on the ballot.

Usual for an offyear election under a Republican president, the Democratic Party are successful in the races for the governorships in Virginia and New Jersey, but the Democrats did worse in these two states than they did in 2001. Despite the underperformance, they are still favorable showings for the Democrats and they ultimately cruised to a blue wave in the 2006 mid-term elections.

== Federal elections ==
There were three total special elections to the United States House of Representatives during 2005: California's 5th congressional district, California's 48th, and Ohio's 2nd. In each of these special elections, the incumbent party won.

== State elections ==
=== Gubernatorial elections ===
Only New Jersey, Virginia, and the Northern Mariana Islands featured off-year gubernatorial races in 2005.

==== New Jersey ====
Democratic U.S. Senator Jon Corzine defeated Republican businessman Doug Forrester 53% to 43%, taking the open seat held by acting governor Richard Codey since Democrat Jim McGreevey resigned in 2004.

==== Virginia ====
Democratic Lieutenant Governor Tim Kaine defeated former Republican Attorney General Jerry Kilgore 52% to 46%, in the race to succeed term-limited Democratic Governor Mark Warner.

==== Northern Mariana Islands ====
Benigno Fitial, who belonged to the local Covenant Party, narrowly defeated independent Heinz Hofschneider and incumbent Republican Governor Juan N. Babauta to win the governorship in that U.S. territory.

=== State legislative elections ===
Legislative elections were held for the New Jersey General Assembly, the Virginia House of Delegates, and the Northern Mariana Islands Commonwealth Legislature. Democrats maintained a comfortable majority in the lower house of the New Jersey legislature, while Republicans maintained control of the lower chamber of the Virginia legislature.

=== Citizen initiatives ===
- California had eight questions on the ballot for the voters to consider. The election was seen as a referendum on Gov. Arnold Schwarzenegger (who was up for reelection in 2006), as he sponsored and actively campaigned for four propositions on the ballot, Propositions 74 - 77. All eight propositions failed by varying margins.
- In Maine, voters decided a number of issues. Question 1 considered whether to repeal a law passed by the state legislature banning discrimination on the basis of sexual orientation (see gay rights). The initiative to make discrimination on the basis of sexual orientation legal failed, and the legislature's law was upheld for the first time by Mainers. The state was also considering whether to pass a constitutional amendment designed to lower property taxes for fishermen by taxing property based on current use, rather than potential resale value. The measure passed overwhelmingly.
- As the last two elected governors (Christine Todd Whitman and Jim McGreevey) had resigned, forcing a series of acting governors, New Jersey considered whether to create the post of Lieutenant Governor; the measure passed.
- Ohio was considering whether to move the electoral redistricting process from the authority of the legislature to a non-partisan panel. Ohio also considered (in separate measures) whether to reduce individual financial contributions to political candidates, move election oversight to a bipartisan panel and away from the Secretary of State, and whether to allow all voters to vote early by mail. All four measures failed. These measures were placed on the ballot as a response to the controversies of the 2004 Presidential election in Ohio.
- In Texas, Proposition 2, a legislatively referred constitutional proposition, passed, making Texas the 18th state to amend its constitution to prohibit same-sex marriage. This result was largely expected.
- An initiative to shorten the planned expansion of the Seattle Monorail was denied, meaning no expansion will be built at all. Four previous initiatives to cancel the project had been unsuccessful. However, a state Fuel Tax, which is earmarked for transportation improvements including the Evergreen Point Floating Bridge, was not repealed.

=== Judicial elections ===
==== Pennsylvania ====
Perceiving the Supreme Court's decisions as supporting corruption and secrecy in Harrisburg, voters refused to grant State Supreme Court Justice Russell Nigro a retention vote. Nigro lost very narrowly, becoming the first justice in Pennsylvania history to lose a retention vote. Fellow Justice Sandra Schultz Newman was retained. The vote was closely connected with the backlash against the Harrisburg establishment and the 2005 legislative pay raise which increased judges' and legislators' salaries.

== Local elections ==
Many additional cities across the United States held mayoral elections; this list is representative, not inclusive. Nationally, the vast majority of mayors were reelected, often by wide margins, and there were few partisan upsets.

Some of the major races included:

- Buffalo, New York: Democrat Byron Brown defeated Republican Kevin Helfer to replace the retiring Anthony Masiello.
- New York, New York: Incumbent Republican mayor Mike Bloomberg defeated former Bronx Borough President Fernando Ferrer.
- San Diego, California: Republican Jerry Sanders defeated Democrat Donna Frye in a special election held after the resignation of Dick Murphy.
- St. Paul, Minnesota: Democrat Chris Coleman defeated incumbent Randy Kelly.
