= 2005 United States state legislative elections =

- November 8, 2005

2 legislative chambers 2 states
	Majority party	Minority party
Party	Republican	Democratic
Chambers before	50 (Note: The Iowa Senate was evenly split. Thus it is not included in either total.)	48
Chambers after	50	48
Overall change	Steady	Steady
- Map of lower house elections: Democrats retained control Republicans retained control No regularly-scheduled elections

The 2005 United States state legislative elections were held on November 8, 2005. Two legislative chambers in two states held regularly scheduled elections. These off-year elections coincided with other state and local elections, including gubernatorial elections in two states. Both chambers of the Northern Mariana Islands legislature was up.

Democrats maintained control of the New Jersey General Assembly and Republicans maintained control of the Virginia House of Delegates.

== Summary table ==
Regularly scheduled elections were held in 8 of the 99 state legislative chambers in the United States. Nationwide, regularly scheduled elections were held for 578 of the 7,383 legislative seats. This table only covers regularly scheduled elections; additional special elections took place concurrently with these regularly scheduled elections.

State	Upper House				Lower House			
State	Seats up	Total	% up	Term	Seats up	Total	% up	Term
New Jersey	0	0	100	2/4 (Note: The upper houses of Arkansas, Delaware, Florida, Hawaii, Illinois, Minnesota, New Jersey, and Texas use a 2-4-4 term length system.)	80	80	100	2
Virginia	0	0	100	4	100	100	100	2

== State summaries ==
=== New Jersey ===
All seats of the New Jersey General Assembly were up for election. Assembly members were elected to two-year terms in two-member districts. Democrats slightly increased their majority control.

General Assembly
Party	Before	After	Change
Democratic	47	49	▲2
Republican	33	31	▼2
Total	80	80	

=== Virginia ===
All seats of the Virginia House of Delegates are up for election. Delegates are elected to two-year terms in single-member districts. Democrats made slight gains, but Republicans maintained the majority.

House of Delegates
Party	Before	After	Change
Republican	60	57	▼3
Democratic	38	40	▲2
Independents	2	3	▲1
Total	100	100	

== Territorial and federal district summaries ==
=== Northern Mariana Islands ===
All seats of the Northern Mariana Islands House of Representatives and half of the Northern Mariana Islands Senate are up for election. Senators are elected to four-year terms and Representatives are elected to two-year terms.

House of Representatives
Party	Before	After	Change
Republican	7	7	Steady
Democratic	1	2	▲1
Independents	1	2	▲1
Covenant Party	9	7	▼2
Total	18	18	

Senate
Party	Before	After	Change
Republican	2	3	▲1
Democratic	2	2	Steady
Covenant Party	3	3	Steady
Independents	2	1	▼1
Total	9	9	

== See also ==
- 2005 United States gubernatorial elections
