= Nick Coleman (politician) =

American politician

5th Minnesota Senate Majority Leader
- In office January 1973 – January 1981
- Preceded by: Stanley W. Holmquist
- Succeeded by: Roger Moe

5th Minnesota Senate Minority Leader
- In office January 1971 – January 1973
- Preceded by: Karl F. Grittner
- Succeeded by: Harold G. Krieger

Member of the Minnesota State Senate
- In office 1963–1981

Personal details
- Born: Nicholas David Coleman; February 23, 1925 Saint Paul, Minnesota, US
- Died: March 5, 1981 (aged 56) Saint Paul, Minnesota, US
- Party: Minnesota Democratic-Farmer-Labor Party
- Spouse(s): Bridget Finnegan; Deborah Howell
- Children: Nicholas J., Patrick, Maureen, Brendan, Meghan, Christopher, Emmett.
- Education: College of St. Thomas; University of Minnesota
- Occupation: advertising agency owner, legislator

Nicholas David Coleman (February 23, 1925 – March 5, 1981) was a Minnesota politician and a former member and majority leader of the Minnesota Senate. A Democrat, he was first elected in 1962 and reelected in 1966, 1970, 1972, and 1976. He represented the old districts 45, 46, and 65, which changed through the years due to legislative redistricting, and included portions of the city of Saint Paul in Ramsey County.

Born in Saint Paul, Coleman served as a Signalman 2nd Class in the United States Navy during World War II. He entered politics as a volunteer for the 1948 congressional campaign of Eugene McCarthy, then a professor at the College of St. Thomas (now the University of St. Thomas), where Coleman was a student. He was later Minnesota chair for the 1964 presidential campaign of Lyndon Johnson.

While in the Senate, Coleman served as an assistant minority leader from 1967 to 1970, as minority leader during the 1971–1972 biennium, and as the first Democrat in 114 years to become majority leader—a position he held from 1973 until leaving the Senate in 1981. The Democrats held the majority in that chamber of the Minnesota Legislature until January, 2011. He was an unsuccessful candidate for the DFL Party's endorsement for governor in 1970, and for the U.S. Senate in 1978.

Coleman was a founder and partner of the advertising agency Coleman-Goff Advertising, later known as Coleman and Christison. He was the father of Chris Coleman, the former mayor of St. Paul, of Minnesota journalist Nick Coleman, and of the Acquisitions Librarian at the Minnesota Historical Society Library, Patrick K. Coleman. Prior to his career in advertising, he was a high school teacher for two years in the rural town of Tyler, Minnesota.

Coleman was married twice. He left his first wife, the mother of his seven children, to marry Deborah Howell, who was 14 years his junior. The divorce and betrayal cost him his relationship with then-governor Rudy Perpich, who was a devout Catholic.

Coleman died of leukemia on March 5, 1981. His body lay in state in the Minnesota State Capitol before burial in Fort Snelling National Cemetery in Minneapolis.

== Sources ==
- Lacy, Robert. "A Very Fine Fellow from Frogtown. Remembering Nick Coleman – from Many Viewpoints." Minnesota Law and Politics, February/March 2009, p. 12–16.
- Milton, John Watson, "Five Sons of Erin at the State Capitol," 'Ramsey County History' Magazine, Spring 2009
- Milton, John Watson, "How the Adman Became the Senator from Ramsey," Ramsey County History Magazine, Spring 2011
- Milton, John Watson, For the Good of the Order, the life and times of Minnesota's Senator Nick Coleman, to be published in 2011
