= 2001 Saint Paul mayoral election =

- November 6, 2001
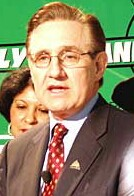

| Candidate | Randy Kelly | Jay Benanav |
| Party | Democratic (DFL) | Democratic (DFL) |
| Popular vote | 29,819 | 29,416 |
| Percentage | 50.07% | 49.39% |
Mayor before election
Norm Coleman
Republican
Elected Mayor
Chris Coleman
Democratic (DFL)

The 2001 Saint Paul mayoral election in the U.S. state of Minnesota held a scheduled primary election on 11 September and a general election on 6 November.

Incumbent mayor Norm Coleman had opted against seeking a third term.

The general election was particularly close, with Kelly winning by a mere 403 vote margin.

== Candidates ==
- Marc D. Anderson
- Sharon Anderson
- Jay Benavav, City Council member
- Jerry Blakely
- David R. Buehler
- Bill Dahn
- Tom Fiske
- Honey M. Hervey
- Bill Hosko
- Bob Kessler, former administrative employee for Saint Paul mayor's office
- Randy Kelly, Minnesota State Senator
- Bob Long, St. Paul City Council member
- Louie Lopez
- Roberta "Bobbi" Megard, activist
- Devin L. Miller
- Maryjane Reagan

== Primary ==
A primary was held on September 11, from which the top two candidates would advance to the general election.

The primary coincided with the date of the September 11th terrorist attacks on the United States.

Saint Paul Mayoral Primary results
| Party | Candidate | Votes | % |
|---|---|---|---|
| Nonpartisan | Jay Benavav | 11,441 | 30.36 |
| Nonpartisan | Randy Kelly | 10,006 | 26.55 |
| Nonpartisan | Bob Long | 6,456 | 17.13 |
| Nonpartisan | Jerry Blakely | 4,564 | 12.11 |
| Nonpartisan | Bob Kessler | 2,187 | 5.80 |
| Nonpartisan | Roberta "Bobbi" Megard | 1,989 | 5.28 |
| Nonpartisan | Sharon Anderson | 241 | 0.64 |
| Nonpartisan | Bill Hosko | 191 | 0.51 |
| Nonpartisan | Marc D. Anderson | 136 | 0.36 |
| Nonpartisan | Maryjane Reagan | 136 | 0.31 |
| Nonpartisan | Devin L. Miller | 108 | 0.29 |
| Nonpartisan | Louie Lopez | 62 | 0.16 |
| Nonpartisan | David R. Buehler | 57 | 0.15 |
| Nonpartisan | Tom Fiske | 58 | 0.15 |
| Nonpartisan | Bill Dahn | 42 | 0.11 |
| Nonpartisan | Honey M. Hervey | 37 | 0.10 |
| Total votes | | 37,690 | 100 |

== General Election Results ==
Outgoing mayor Norm Coleman threw his support behind Kelly, and Kelly campaigned as a candidate that promised to continue much of Coleman's leadership style.

Kelly pledged that public safety would be his top priority, while Benavav pledged that housing would be his.

Saint Paul General Election Results
| Party | Candidate | Votes | % |
|---|---|---|---|
| Nonpartisan | Randy Kelly | 29,819 | 50.07 |
| Nonpartisan | Jay Benanav | 29,416 | 49.39 |
| Nonpartisan | Write-Ins | 320 | 0.54 |
| Total votes | | 59,465 | 100.00 |
