= James W. Treffinger =

American politician (born 1950)

James Treffinger

4th County Executive of Essex County
- In office 1995–2003
- Preceded by: Thomas J. D'Alessio
- Succeeded by: Joseph N. DiVincenzo Jr.

Member of the Essex County Board of Chosen Freeholders
- In office 1992–1995

Mayor of Verona, New Jersey
- In office 1993–1995
- Preceded by: Nicholas M. Rolli
- Succeeded by: Nicholas M. Rolli
- In office 1983–1987
- Preceded by: Frank Albright
- Succeeded by: Nicholas M. Rolli

Personal details
- Born: James Padalino; May 20, 1950 (age 76) Newark, New Jersey, U.S.
- Party: Republican (since 1986)
- Other political affiliations: Democratic (until 1986)
- Education: St. Benedict's Prep
- Alma mater: Seton Hall University (BA); University of Bonn; University of Marburg; Rutgers University, Newark (JD)

James William Treffinger (born James Padalino, May 20, 1950) is an American former politician and disbarred lawyer. A member of the Republican Party, he served as County Executive of Essex County, New Jersey from 1995 to 2003. He pleaded guilty to federal charges of obstruction of justice and mail fraud in 2003.

== Early life and legal career ==
Treffinger was born James Padalino in Newark, New Jersey. When he was 4 years old, he was adopted by Fred Treffinger, who had married his mother. He grew up in Maplewood, New Jersey and attended Saint Benedict's Preparatory School in Newark. Treffinger later recalled, "We didn't know many Republicans... My family idolized F.D.R. and Truman and John Kennedy. It was a Catholic family, so Kennedy was a double hero."

Treffinger graduated magna cum laude from Seton Hall University in 1972 with a degree in history. He was selected as a Fulbright scholar, the first in Seton Hall's history, and studied history, jurisprudence and economics in Germany at the University of Bonn and the University of Marburg in 1973.

Treffinger earned a J.D. degree from Rutgers School of Law—Newark in 1976. He was admitted to the bar in New York and New Jersey, concentrating in his legal career on corporate and insurance law. He worked for the Home Insurance Company in New York City from 1982 to 1987, serving as senior vice president for government affairs and associate general counsel. He was special insurance counsel at Willkie Farr & Gallagher from 1987 to 1989. He joined Hughes Hubbard & Reed in 1990, serving as partner until 1995.

== Political career ==
Treffinger began his political career as a member of the Democratic Party, though later switched to the Republican Party in the mid-1980s. He was elected to the Verona Township Council in 1980, serving until 1983, when he was elected Mayor of Verona, New Jersey. He served again on the Township Council from 1987 to 1989 and from 1991 to 1993, and then served another term as mayor from 1993 to 1995. From 1992 to 1995, he served on the Essex County Board of Chosen Freeholders.

In 1994, Treffinger defeated a divided Democratic Party to become the second Republican County Executive of Essex County in 17 years. His predecessor, Thomas J. D'Alessio, had resigned after being convicted of money laundering, fraud and extortion. After taking office, Treffinger reported that the county had been left with a $161 million budget gap and was later credited with nearly closing that gap in the following year. Treffinger won re-election in 1998, defeating former Newark mayor Kenneth A. Gibson by a margin of 50 percent to 47 percent.

Treffinger ran for the United States Senate in 2000. He finished third in the Republican primary with 18 percent of the vote, behind U.S. representative Bob Franks (36 percent) and state senator William Gormley (34 percent).

In November 2001, he announced he would again run for U.S. Senate, in the 2002 race for the seat of incumbent Robert Torricelli. He withdrew from the race in April 2002, after it became known that he was a target of a federal investigation.

While serving as County Executive in 2000, Treffinger and Essex County Sheriff Armando Fontoura banned the television show The Sopranos from filming an episode on county-owned property due to safety concerns and displeasure over the show's portrayal of Italian Americans.

== Indictment and conviction ==
On April 18, 2002, agents from the Federal Bureau of Investigation and the Internal Revenue Service raided Treffinger's county office, carting away boxes of files, computers, and other materials. On October 28, Treffinger was arrested at his house in Verona. U.S. Attorney Chris Christie announced that Treffinger had been charged in a 20-count indictment with extortion, fraud, obstructing a federal investigation and conspiracy. He was released on $100,000 bail.

On May 31, 2003, shortly before his trial was scheduled to begin, Treffinger pleaded guilty to one count of obstruction of justice and one count of mail fraud, admitting that he had solicited an illegal $15,000 campaign contribution in exchange for a county contract, and that he had placed two people on the Essex County payroll who instead worked on his 2000 Senate campaign. The remaining counts were dismissed as part of the plea agreement. On October 17, he was sentenced to 13 months in prison. Treffinger had sought a lighter sentence, saying he was "a new man, a better man" after converting from Catholicism to Baptism and joining an evangelical Baptist congregation in Bloomfield after his arrest.

In December 2004, Treffinger was released from federal prison into the custody of a Newark halfway house. In April 2006, he agreed to pay $171,000 to settle an investigation by the Federal Election Commission over improper use of campaign funds to pay his legal fees. In November 2007, it was reported that Treffinger had enrolled at the Princeton Theological Seminary and was planning to start a ministry for prison inmates.

== See also ==
- List of federal political scandals in the United States

Political offices
Preceded by Thomas J. D'Alessio	County Executive of Essex County, New Jersey; 1995 – 2003	Succeeded by Joseph N. DiVincenzo, Jr.
