= Second Chance Month =

Observation in April in the U.S.

Second Chance Month, observed in the United States during April since 2017, is a nationwide effort to raise awareness of the collateral consequences of a criminal conviction, and unlock second-chance opportunities for people who have completed their sentences to become contributing citizens. The awareness effort is led by Prison Fellowship, the nation's largest nonprofit serving prisoners, former prisoners, and their families, and an advocate for justice reform. Activities include promoting public awareness and encouraging employers to become second-chance employer.

== History and purpose ==
In the United States, one in three American adults has a criminal record, which limits their access to education, jobs, housing, and other things necessary for a productive life. Even after they have completed their sentences and have been released from prison, these men and women face more than 48,000 documented legal restrictions in addition to widespread social stigma. This is sometimes called the “second prison.”

Prison Fellowship founded Second Chance Month in 2017 to raise awareness and improve perceptions of people with a criminal record, encourage second-chance opportunities, and drive momentum for policy change throughout the country. The nonprofit designated April as Second Chance Month for several reasons, including the following:

- The United States Department of Justice recognizes National Reentry Week. during April.
- Prison Fellowship had previously held Second Chance 5K races in April.
- The anniversary of the federal Second Chance Act is during April.
- April marks the anniversary of the death of Charles Colson, who used his second chance following his incarceration for a Watergate-related crime to found Prison Fellowship.
- The Easter season focuses on the message of Christ's atoning sacrifice and themes of redemption and second chances, although Second Chance Month is not a movement restricted to the faith community.

=== 2017 ===
Prison Fellowship declared Second Chance Month for the first time in April 2017. More than 77 organizations joined the nonpartisan effort as official second-chance partners (although partnership does not indicate support for particular legislation or policies). Throughout April, Prison Fellowship mobilized individuals, businesses, organizations, legislators, and other supporters to sign petitions, post to social media, attend special events, and amplify the call for second-chance opportunities in the United States.

==== Congressional resolutions ====
Prison Fellowship asked Senators Amy Klobuchar, D-Minn., and Robert Portman, R-Ohio, to take the lead with the United States Senate resolution to declare April 2017 as Second Chance Month. Sens. James Lankford, R-Okla., and Richard Durbin, D-Ill., also co-sponsored the resolution.

The United States House also introduced a resolution

==== State and local resolutions and proclamations ====
- The State of Colorado, Sponsored by Rep. Cole Wist (R) and Sen. Rhonda Fields (D).
- The State of Maine, Sponsored by Sen. Eric Brakey (R).
- The State of Michigan, Issued by Gov. Rick Snyder (R).
- The City of St. Paul, Minnesota, Issued by Mayor Chris Coleman (D).

==== In the media ====
Second Chance Month 2017 received widespread recognition by media outlets and other groups:

- Second Chance Month – Breaking Down Barriers for Those Returning From Prison (BreakPoint Online)
- What Is Second Chance Month? ‘Christians Should Be Very Troubled’ (Catholic Online)
- Second Chance Month: Affording Former Offenders the Redemption They Deserve (Charles Koch Institute)
- Prison Fellowship, ACLU, NAACP Fight ‘Immoral’ Prison System, Launch ‘Second Chance Month’ for Prisoners (The Christian Post)
- U.S. Senate Declares April ‘Second Chance Month’ in Support of Former Inmates (Cleveland.com)
- Prison Fellowship Launches ‘Second Chance Month’ to Help Convicts (Richmond Free Press)

==== Key events ====
On April 8, 2017, Prison Fellowship hosted the Second Chance 5K walk/run, including a kid's fun run, at Sloan's Lake Park in Denver. Second Chance 5Ks are community events that bring people together inside and outside of prison to raise awareness of the many collateral consequences of a criminal conviction and catalyze real, significant change in public attitudes and policies.

On April 23, 2017, Prison Fellowship and its Minnesota partners hosted the Second Chance 5K at Concordia University's Sea Foam Stadium in St. Paul. The event drew more than 250 participants, including St. Paul's Mayor Chris Coleman, who shared comments at the rally prior to the race. While runners participated on the outside, people ran in solidarity behind bars at Lino Lakes, Shakopee, and Stillwater prisons.

=== 2018 ===
For a second consecutive year, Prison Fellowship declared April as Second Chance Month. More than 200 businesses, congregations, organizations, and others joined with Prison Fellowship as official second-chance partners (partnership does not indicate support for particular legislation or policies). Prison Fellowship's Second Chance Month toolkit provided social media hashtags, sample social media posts, shareable graphics and banners, and other promotional tools for supporters.

==== Resolutions and proclamations ====
Prison Fellowship developed model resolutions and proclamations which have been used by policymakers at the state, federal, and local levels. The total number of state and local resolutions has quadrupled since 2017.

==== White House proclamation ====
For the first time, the White House issued a proclamation recognizing April as Second Chance Month. This took place on March 30, days after Prison Fellowship's president and CEO James J. Ackerman and Vice President of Advocacy and Public Policy Craig DeRoche met with Vice President Mike Pence to discuss Prison Fellowship's work and the nation's readiness for second chances.

==== Congressional resolutions ====
The United States Senate passed a resolution declaring April Second Chance Month for the second year in a row. Sen. Robert Portman, R-Ohio, introduced the resolution. Other sponsors of the bill include Sens. Amy Klobuchar, D-Minn.; James Lankford, R-Okla.; Tammy Duckworth, D-Ill.; John Cornyn, R-Texas; and Gary Peters, D-Mich.

The United States House also introduced a resolution.

==== State and local proclamations, official recognitions, and resolutions ====
Several other jurisdictions issued their own recognitions of Second Chance Month throughout April:

- The State of Alabama, Sponsored by Sen. Cam Ward (R).
- The State of Illinois, Sponsored by Sen. Mattie Hunter (D) and Senator Omar Aquino (D).
- The State of Louisiana, Issued by Gov. John Bel-Edwards (R).
- The State of Michigan, Issued by Gov. Rick Snyder (R) and Lt. Gov. Brian Calley (R).
- The State of Minnesota, Issued by Gov. Mark Dayton (D).
- The State of Nebraska, Issued by Gov. Pete Ricketts (R).
- The State of Oklahoma, Issued by Gov. Mary Fallin (R).
- The State of Rhode Island, Sponsored by Rep. Raymond Hull (D).
- The State of South Carolina, Sponsored by Sen. Karl Allen (D).
- The State of Tennessee, Sponsored by Rep. Brenda Gilmore (D).
- The State of Texas, Issued by Gov. Greg Abbott (R).
- The State of Utah, Issued by Gov. Gary Herbert (R).
- The State of West Virginia, Issued by Gov. Jim Justice (R).
- Collier County, Florida, Issued by the Board of County Commissioners.
- The city of Greenville, South Carolina, Issued by Mayor Knox White (R).
- The city of Minneapolis, Minnesota, Issued by Mayor Jacob Frey (D).
- The city of St. Paul, Minnesota, Issued by Mayor Melvin Carter (D).
- The Council of the District of Columbia, Issued by Council member Charles Allen (D).
- The District of Columbia, Issued by Mayor Muriel Bowser (D).

==== In the media ====
Prison Fellowship's Second Chance Month received exponentially greater media exposure in 2018 than the previous year, with 963 editorial mentions and approximately 507 million article views. Second Chance Month captured the attention of national media outlets including the Wall Street Journal, Washington Post, Huffington Post, FOX News, PBS NewsHour, The Hill, USA Today, CNN, and New York Times. Regional news coverage of Second Chance Month events took place in 23 targeted media markets around the country. A combined 800 million people were reached through #SecondChanceMonth earned and social media.

Several op-eds ran throughout the month, including the following:

- Let’s unlock second chances in Alabama (Alabama Political Reporter)
- Second chances are rung on ladder to new life (Naples Daily News)
- How South Carolina can give convicts a second chance (The Post and Courier)
- One in four American adults lives with a criminal record—it’s time for them to get a chance (FoxNews.com)

==== Key events ====
Several key events took place to raise support and awareness for Second Chance Month in 2018, including the following:

Second Chance Sundays: Throughout April, churches hosted Second Chance Sunday services with special messages and prayer for returning citizens and their families. Pastors delivered sermons on redemption and second chances, including this sermon by Pastor Jon Kelly of Chicago West Bible Church, who served time in prison before joining the ministry.

April 7: Prison Fellowship organized the Road to Second Chances in Washington, D.C., along with partners including the D.C. Mayor’s Office of Returning Citizen Affairs; Healing Communities USA; the DC Dream Center; Anacostia River Church; National Association of Criminal Defense Lawyers; Little Lights; Friends of the Guest House; So Others Might Eat; Central Union Mission; Women Involved in Reentry Efforts; Christian Legal Aid; Academy of Hope Adult Public Charter School; SOME Center for Employment Training; Council for Court Excellence; One Love = True Change; Center for State Governments Justice Center; Harvest Life Fellowship Church; Dress for Success Washington, D.C.; and others. Hundreds of people gathered at Anacostia Park for a community-wide prayer walk ending at the DC Dream Center. The event featured a press conference, true stories of people searching for their second chance, and a reentry fair with legal, educational, employment, advocacy, and counseling services.

April 22: To raise awareness and promote second chances, Prison Fellowship hosted the second annual Second Chance 5K in St. Paul along with local partners including Charis Prison Ministry; Concordia University, St. Paul; Conflict Resolution Minnesota; Community Mediation & Restorative Services, Inc.; Crossing HOME; I AM DUCHE BRADLEY, Mile in My Shoes; Minnesota Adult and Teen Challenge; the Minnesota Second Chance Coalition; Sparrows Rising; Thrive! Family Support; and Ujamaa Place. In 2018, 335 participated in the St. Paul Second Chance 5K, including community members, former prisoners, and Mayor Jacob Frey, D-Minneapolis. Mayor Frey finished first in the 5K and participated as a rally speaker along with Minnesota State Representative Fue Lee, a member of former mayor Chris Coleman's office, and Duche Bradley. Meanwhile, 912 prisoners at Faribault, Lino Lakes, Shakopee, and Stillwater prisons ran in solidarity with those outside.

Trumbull Correctional Institution (TCI) was the first Ohio prison to conduct a Second Chance 5K. WKBN covered the story of the 5K at TCI.

ConBody, the creator of the prison-style boot camp that employs former prisoners as trainers, organized a Second Chance 5K in New York City.

Prison Fellowship organized the Virtual Second Chance 5K for people to show support for Second Chance Month in their own communities. Registered participants received a special race packet including a runner's medal and race bib.

April 23: On Capitol Hill, Prison Fellowship co-hosted a screening of Knife Skills with Sen. Rob Portman, R-Ohio. The film received an Academy Award nomination for 2018 Best Documentary Short Subject. The Capitol Hill event included a discussion moderated by CNN commentator Shermichael Singleton and featuring the film's director, Thomas Lennon, and EDWINS owner, Brandon Chrostowski. Sen. Portman offered remarks after the screening.

Other local Second Chance Month events, including 5Ks and job fairs, were organized by individuals and groups in communities across the country.

=== 2019 ===
==== Official Proclamations and bipartisan resolution making April 2019 official Second Chance Month ====
On March 11, 2019, U.S. Representatives Mark Walker (R-N.C.) and Tony Cárdenas (D-Calif.) introduced a resolution expressing support for April 2019 to be recognized as Second Chance Month. A Senate companion bill is being introduced by U.S. Senators Amy Klobuchar (D-Minn.) and Rob Portman (R-Ohio).

On March 29, the White House issued an official proclamation, making April 2019 proclaim April 2019 as Second Chance Month. From the proclamation, the president's quote:

"I call on all Americans to commemorate this month with events and activities that raise public awareness about preventing crime and providing those who have completed their sentences an opportunity for an honest second chance."

==== Second Chance Month Events ====
- April 1: Washington, D.C., 2019 Prison Reform Summit and First Step Act Celebration, The White House hosts an invitation-only event celebrating the successful passage of the First Step Act last December, holds discussions on potential reform efforts
- April 2: Hartsville, South Carolina, 2019 Workforce Reentry Seminar: Fill in the Gaps, The Hartsville Chamber of Commerce holds a workforce reentry seminar that provides tips about resume writing, effective interviewing, and searching for jobs.
- April 8: New York, New York, Launch of New Clean Slate Clearinghouse —a project funded by, and developed in partnership with, the U.S. Department of Labor (DOL) and the U.S. Department of Justice (DOJ)—is an online resource that provides information and resources on juvenile and adult record clearance in all states and U.S. territories. Check out the new website, including interactive maps and updated information, at cleanslateclearinghouse.org.
- April 9: Washington, D.C., Eleventh Anniversary of George W. Bush Signing the Second Chance Act, On April 9, 2008, then-President George W. Bush signed the Second Chance Act into law with bipartisan support behind him. Since then, the Second Chance Act has funded countless vital programs and systems reforms to improve reentry process, including the National Reentry Resource Center; the Second Chance Reauthorization Act, part of the First Step Act, was passed in December 2018.
- April 10: Beaver, West Virginia, West Virginia Reentry Resource Fair, Southern West Virginia Reentry Council's resource fair features a reentry simulation to demonstrate challenges and barriers faced by this population.
- April 13: Roseville, Minnesota, Second Chance Month 2019 – Minnesota 5K, Prison Fellowship and the University of Northwestern will host the third annual Second Chance 5K in Minnesota. To register, visit here.
- April 18: Jersey City, New Jersey, The Road to Salvation: From Addiction to Employment Conference, Speakers at NJ Reentry Corporation's annual conference include Senator Bob Menendez, Rev. Al Sharpton, and NJ Attorney General Gurbir Grewal.
- April 23: Baton Rouge, Louisiana, Reentry Alliance of Louisiana (REAL) Annual Conference, REAL's fifth annual conference provides information on best practices for a successful reentry and honors champions from across the state in a series of plenaries about building coalitions and improving communities. U.S. Congressman Cedric Richards is the keynote speaker.
- April 29: Stamford, Connecticut, Family ReEntry Discussion About Successful Reentry, Family ReEntry will speak about successful reentry and life in the criminal justice system.
- April 30: Alexandria, Virginia, Alexandria Reentry Resource Fair, Alexandria Reentry Council hosts a resource fair where returning citizens and families have the chance to interact with community partners, gain information, and get questions answered.
- May 6: Phoenix, Arizona, 2019 Reentry Employer Forum, The second annual Reentry Employer forum educates employers about the benefits of hiring people who face barriers to employment. The event features Gov. Doug Ducey and Arizona Cardinals CEO Michael Bidwill as speakers.

=== 2020 ===
Due to the COVID-19 pandemic, Prison Fellowship and its partners adapted Second Chance Month 2020 events from in-person to virtual in response to the virus.

==== Resolutions and Proclamations ====
Prison Fellowship joined 20 states and jurisdictions, along with the White House, to formally declare April as Second Chance Month.

- Alabama
- Alaska
- Arizona
- Arkansas
- Colorado
- Hawaii
- Iowa
- Mississippi
- Missouri
- Muscogee (Creek) Nation
- Nebraska
- New Jersey
- Oklahoma
- Tennessee
- Texas
- The state of Washington
- Washington, D.C.
- West Virginia
- Wisconsin

==== Second Chance Month Events ====
Throughout April, social media campaigns, prayer groups, Twitter chats, and other activities centered around Second Chance Month took place around the nation. Prayer leaders in Detroit, Chicago, Minneapolis, Lincoln, Oklahoma City, Fresno, and San Bernardino joined forces for a Road to Second Chances Virtual Prayer Meeting, where community members from all these cities came together to cover our nation with prayer. More than 380 partners joined Prison Fellowship in advocating for second chances, and several states declared their support for Second Chance Month.

==== In the Media ====
Several op-eds and articles highlighting Second Chance Month ran throughout April, including:

- Congress should include second chances in coronavirus relief bill (The Hill)
- April is Second Chance Month: Declare Your Support for Those Affected by Incarceration (Global Leadership Network)
- Supporting Second Chance Month—Revitalizing Corrections to Support Successful Reentry (Cision PR Newswire)
- April Is Second Chance Month (Bureau of Justice Assistance)
- New Data: Second Chance Pell Continues to Open Doors for More Students (Vera Institute of Justice)
- Department of Justice Awards More than $92 Million to Support Offenders Returning to Communities (U.S. Department of Justice)
- What the Bible Says About Second Chances (Ethics and Religious Liberty Commission)
- Opinion: An opportunity to celebrate second chances (The Detroit News)
- Second Chance Month matters even more during the COVID-19 pandemic (Tennessean)
- Education is the best second chance for many inmates (Tennessean)
- Resolution supports Second Chance Month and Prison Fellowship’s efforts to unlock better futures for former inmates (The Montgomery Independent)

==== Key Events ====
April 1: Prison Fellowship pivots to celebrate the fourth annual Second Chance Month with a virtual gala.

April 1: The White House issues a proclamation, signed by the president, declaring April as Second Chance Month for the third year in a row.

April 18: The Road to Second Chances Virtual Prayer Meeting featured real-life stories of people living out their second chance and opportunities to pray for all those affected by crime and incarceration.

==== Throughout April ====
- 46 panelists participated in four Second Chance Month Twitter chats.
- 489 participants from 41 states joined the Virtual Prayer Meeting.
- 17 governors and D.C. declared April as Second Chance Month.
- 1,279 advocates from 50 states sent 2,460 letters in support of Second Chance Month.
- 40,944 people learned about the barriers to second chances via Prison Fellowship's website.
- 4,424 social media posts were shared in April to support second chances.
- 40 million people from 47 countries saw #SecondChanceMonth social media posts.
