= Nick Coleman (columnist) =

American journalist

Nicholas J. Coleman (June 26, 1950 – May 16, 2018) was an American journalist for the Star Tribune, the daily newspaper published in Minneapolis, Minnesota and the St. Paul Pioneer Press. Coleman had two stints at the Star Tribune, having begun his career there in 1973. In 1986, Coleman left the Star Tribune and became a news columnist at the St. Paul Pioneer Press. Coleman was with the Pioneer Press until 2003, when he then returned to the Star Tribune as a Metro News columnist, staying until 2009.

In his 35-year newspaper career, Coleman reported on Minneapolis and St. Paul city government, business, out-of-state issues, media, and general news. He has had published more than 3,000 newspaper columns and 300 television commentaries. Politics, Native American issues and the Northern Ireland peace process are his favored themes. He also hosted two radio talk shows.

Coleman was the eldest child of the late Nicholas D. (Nick) Coleman, who served as majority leader of the Minnesota Senate from 1973 to 1981, and Bridget Finnegan. He is also the oldest brother and godfather of Mayor Chris Coleman of St. Paul and was the stepson of Deborah Howell, ombudsman for The Washington Post. Howell was editor of the Pioneer Press when Coleman was hired there in 1986. Coleman died at a hospital in Saint Paul, Minnesota after suffering a massive stroke.
