= John Harrington (American politician) =

American politician (born 1956)

Commissioner of the Minnesota Department of Public Safety
- In office January 5, 2019 – January 3, 2023
- Appointed by: Tim Walz
- Preceded by: Ramona Dohman
- Succeeded by: Bob Jacobson

Member of the Minnesota Senate from the 67th district
- In office January 4, 2011 – September 3, 2012
- Preceded by: Mee Moua
- Succeeded by: Foung Hawj

55th Chief of the Saint Paul Police Department
- In office July 1, 2004 – June 30, 2010
- Appointed by: Randy Kelly
- Preceded by: William Finney
- Succeeded by: Thomas E. Smith

Personal details
- Born: January 16, 1956 (age 70) Chicago, Illinois
- Party: Democratic–Farmer–Labor
- Children: Seven
- Education: Dartmouth College; College of St. Thomas
- Occupation: Teacher, legislator, former police chief

John Mark Harrington (born 1956) is a former commissioner of the Minnesota Department of Public Safety for the U.S. State of Minnesota, appointed by Governor Tim Walz. He served from 2019 to 2023. Harrington previously served as Chief of the Saint Paul Police Department (2004-2010) and Chief of the Metro Transit Police (2012-2019) in Minneapolis–Saint Paul. He is a former member of the Minnesota Senate who represented District 67, which includes portions of the city of Saint Paul in Ramsey County. A Democrat, he is a teacher and manager at Metropolitan State University in Saint Paul.

== Biography ==
=== Early life, education and career ===
John Harrington grew up in Chicago until he finished high school at De La Salle Institute. He received his Bachelor of Arts from Dartmouth College, where he majored in Far East religion and minored in Chinese. He earned a master's degree in education from the University of St. Thomas in Saint Paul, Minnesota. He also graduated from the FBI National Academy, the National Executive Institute, and the Harvard Senior Management Institute. Harrington began his police career in 1977 at the Saint Paul Police Department, working his way up the chain of command from patrol officer. He was selected as chief of police in 2004 and served in that role until 2010. As chief of police, he addressed some of Saint Paul's most difficult problems, developing innovative programs that greatly reduced domestic violence and gang involvement. He also increased the diversity of the police department by 40% and worked with the private sector to increase police resources.

=== State Senate ===
Harrington was elected to the Senate in 2010, running after Senator Mee Moua decided not to seek reelection. Before winning the November general election, he defeated eight challengers in the August primary. He was a member of the Education, the Judiciary and Public Safety, and the Local Government and Elections committees. He was also appointed to the Senate Ethics Committee and Redistricting Committee. His special legislative concerns included public safety, education, and employment. Harrington vacated his seat weeks before the November 2012 election and was named chief of the Metro Transit Police.

=== St. Paul Police Department ===
Harrington was a member of the Saint Paul Police Department from 1977 to 2010, serving as its chief from 2004 to 2010.

=== Metro Transit ===
In September 2012, Harrington was sworn in as chief of Metro Transit Police in Minneapolis–Saint Paul.

=== Ujamaa Place ===
After retiring from the Saint Paul Police Department, Harrington became the president and CEO of Ujamaa Place, a nonprofit organization in Saint Paul that serves African American men who are economically disadvantaged and have experienced repeated cycles of failure. His name recognition helped the organization raise over $1 million. Harrington stepped down as CEO in 2012 but continues to serve as chair of the organization's board.
