= Second-chance hiring =

Practice of not discriminating potential hires based on past convictions

In the United States, second-chance hiring or fair-chance hiring is when an employer does not automatically disqualify all prospective job applicants who have prior involvement in the criminal justice system. Instead, the hiring process includes an evaluation of the individual. For example, if a person has a past conviction related to driving, but the job involves no driving, then the conviction may not be relevant. Similarly, since most recidivism happens within the first three years, then old convictions may not be relevant.

It can be part of a diversity, equity, and inclusion program.

== See also ==
- Ban the Box
- Second Chance Month
- Second Chance Act (2007) – US law
