= 2005 New Jersey gubernatorial election =

- November 8, 2005
- Turnout: 49%
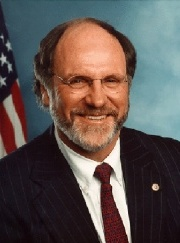

Nominee	Jon Corzine	Doug Forrester
Party	Democratic	Republican
Popular vote	1,224,551	985,271
Percentage	53.47%	43.02%
- Corzine: 40–50% 50–60% 60–70% 70–80% 80–90% >90% Forrester: 40–50% 50–60% 60–70% 70–80% >90% Tie: 50%
Governor before election
Richard Codey
Democratic
Elected Governor
Jon Corzine
Democratic

The 2005 New Jersey gubernatorial election was a race to determine the governor of New Jersey. It was held on November 8, 2005. Democratic governor Richard Codey, who replaced Governor Jim McGreevey in 2004 after his resignation, did not run for election for a full term of office.

The primary election was held on June 7, 2005. U.S. senator Jon Corzine won the Democratic nomination without serious opposition. Former West Windsor Mayor Doug Forrester received the Republican nomination with a plurality of 36%. Corzine defeated Forrester in the general election. New Jersey is reliably Democratic at the federal level, but this was the first time since 1977 in which Democrats won more than one consecutive gubernatorial election in the state. This was the first time since 1965 that a Democrat won a gubernatorial race without Ocean County, and the first since 1961 that they did so without Monmouth County.

The 2005 general election also saw a public referendum question on the ballot for the voters to decide whether to create a position of lieutenant governor, alter the state's order of succession, and whether the state's first lieutenant governor would be chosen in the subsequent gubernatorial election held in 2009. The question passed by a tally of 836,134 votes (56.1%) to 655,333 (43.9%). To date, this is the most recent election that Salem County voted for the Democratic candidate in a gubernatorial race.

== Background ==
Governor Jim McGreevey was elected in 2001 by a large margin but resigned from office in November 2004 after Golan Cipel, an Israeli national and former advisor to the Governor, threatened to bring a lawsuit for sexual harassment, and thus reveal McGreevey was homosexual. Though McGreevey admitted to an "adult consensual affair with another man" on August 12, 2004, he announced that he would not resign from office until November 15, after the fall general election.

McGreevey's decision to delay the effective date of his resignation until after September 3, 2004, avoided a November special election for governor, which would have coincided with the election for President of the United States. The 2004 election between George W. Bush and John Kerry was expected to be competitive, the political aftermath of the September 11 attacks in the state, and some observers speculated that McGreevey's decision to delay his resignation was designed to improve Kerry's political position and preserve Democratic Party control of the office of governor.

Republicans and Democrats alike called upon McGreevey to make his resignation effective immediately. The New York Times editorial board opined, "Mr. McGreevey's strategy to delay resignation does not serve New Jersey residents well. The state will be led by an embattled governor mired in personal and legal problems for three months." On September 15, U.S. District Judge Garrett E. Brown Jr. dismissed Afran v. McGreevey, a lawsuit by Green Party members claiming that the postponement of McGreevey's resignation had left a vacancy, thereby violating New Jerseyans' voting rights.

New Jersey Senate President Richard Codey took office upon McGreevey's resignation and served the remainder of the term until January 17, 2006. At the time of McGreevey's resignation, the New Jersey State Constitution stipulated that the Senate president retains that position while serving as acting governor. In the wake of McGreevey's resignation, and in consideration of other past New Jersey governors who had left office before the end of their terms, the New Jersey legislature passed a resolution establishing a public referendum on the creation of the position of Lieutenant Governor of New Jersey effective with the 2009 elections.

== Democratic primary ==
=== Candidates ===
==== Nominee ====
- Jon Corzine, U.S. senator

==== Eliminated in primary ====
- James D. Kelly Jr., telecommunications company employee
- Francis X. Tenaglio, former Pennsylvania state representative

==== Declined ====
- Richard Codey, incumbent governor and president of the New Jersey Senate

=== Polling ===
Poll source	Date(s) administered	Sample size	Margin of error	Richard Codey	Jon Corzine	Other	Undecided
Quinnipiac	November 9–15, 2004	814 RV	±3.4%	20%	60%	1%	19%
Quinnipiac	January 18–24, 2005	433 RV	±4.7%	33%	43%	0%	23%

=== Results ===
Democratic Primary results
Party	Candidate	Votes	%
Democratic	Jon S. Corzine	207,670	88.08
Democratic	James D. Kelly, Jr.	19,512	8.28
Democratic	Francis X. Tenaglio	8,596	3.65
Total votes		235,778	100.00

== Republican primary ==
=== Candidates ===
==== Nominee ====
- Doug Forrester, former mayor of West Windsor and nominee for U.S. Senate in 2002

==== Eliminated in Primary ====
- Todd Caliguire, Bergen County Freeholder
- Paul DiGaetano, assemblyman from Nutley
- Steve Lonegan, mayor of Bogota
- John J. Murphy, Morris County Freeholder and former mayor of Morris Township
- Bob Schroeder, Washington Township (Bergen County) councilman
- Bret Schundler, former mayor of Jersey City and nominee for governor in 2001

==== Declined ====
- Chris Christie, U.S. Attorney for the District of New Jersey

=== Polling ===
Poll source	Date(s) administered	Sample size	Margin of error	Todd Caliguire	Paul Di Gaetano	Doug Forrester	Steve Lonegan	John Murphy	Bob Schroeder	Bret Schundler	Other	Undecided
Quinnipiac	January 18–24, 2005	329 RV	±5.4%	0%	1%	32%	0%	3%	0%	32%	3%	30%
Quinnipiac	March 9–14, 2005	268 RV	±6.0%	0%	0%	33%	1%	2%	0%	29%	3%	31%

Hypothetical polling

Poll source	Date(s) administered	Sample size	Margin of error	Diane Allen	Chris Christie	Doug Forrester	Bret Schundler	Other	Undecided
Quinnipiac	November 9–15, 2004	623 RV	±3.9%	11%	12%	19%	34%	0%	24%

=== Results ===
Republican Primary results
Party	Candidate	Votes	%
Republican	Doug Forrester	108,941	36.01
Republican	Bret Schundler	94,417	31.21
Republican	John J. Murphy	33,800	11.17
Republican	Steve Lonegan	24,433	8.08
Republican	Robert Schroeder	16,763	5.54
Republican	Paul DiGaetano	16,684	5.52
Republican	Todd Caliguire	7,463	2.47
Total votes		302,501	100.00

== General election ==
=== Candidates ===
- Wesley Bell, former mayor of Stafford Township (Independent)
- Hector Castillo, physician and candidate for mayor of Paterson in 2002 (Independent)
- Jon Corzine, U.S. senator (Democratic)
- Ed Forchion, Candidate for U.S. representative in New Jersey's 3rd congressional district in 2004 (Marijuana)
- Doug Forrester, businessman, nominee for U.S. Senate in 2002, and former mayor of West Windsor (Republican)
- Angela Lariscy, candidate for U.S. representative in New Jersey's 13th congressional district in 2004 (Socialist Workers)
- Michael Latigona, registered nurse and EMT from Marlton (Independent)
- Jeffrey Pawlowski, former Sayreville borough councilman (Libertarian)
- Constantino Rozzo, candidate for U.S. representative in New Jersey's 2nd congressional district in 2004 (Socialist)
- Matthew Thieke, computer software analyst and resident of Maple Shade (Green)

=== Debates ===
The New Jersey Election Law Enforcement Commission declared that the four candidates would be included in the official gubernatorial debates to be aired on NJN. They included Jeffrey Pawlowski and Hector Castillo.

- Complete video of debate, September 20, 2005
- Complete video of debate, October 18, 2005
- Complete video of debate, November 5, 2005

=== Predictions ===
Source	Ranking	As of
Sabato's Crystal Ball	Likely D	October 25, 2005

=== Polling ===
View source data.

Source	Date	Sample size	Margin of error	Jon Corzine (D)	Doug Forrester (R)	Other	Undecided
Quinnipiac	August 19–23, 2004	887 RV	±3.3%	50%	27%	2%	21%
Quinnipiac	November 9–15, 2004	2,235 RV	±2.1%	51%	29%	1%	19%
Quinnipiac	January 18–24, 2004	1,215 RV	±2.8%	51%	29%	1%	19%
Quinnipiac	March 9–14, 2005	937 RV	±3.2%	50%	33%	1%	16%
Rasmussen	June 8, 2005			47%	40%	5%	8%
Rutgers	June 12, 2005			43%	33%	–	–
Quinnipiac	June 15, 2005			47%	37%	–	–
Rasmussen	July 15, 2005			50%	38%	4%	8%
Strategic Vision	July 19, 2005			48%	40%	–	–
Fairleigh Dickinson-PublicMind	July 21, 2005			47%	34%	–	–
Rasmussen	August 7, 2005			45%	37%	5%	–
Quinnipiac	August 10, 2005			50%	40%	–	–
Strategic Vision	August 18, 2005			50%	40%	–	–
Star-Ledger/Eagleton-Rutgers	September 12, 2005			48%	28%	–	–
Strategic Vision	September 16, 2005			47%	36%	–	–
Rasmussen	September 19, 2005			47%	36%	5%	–
Fairleigh-Dickinson	September 26, 2005			48%	38%	4%	10%
Monmouth University	September 28, 2005			46%	38%	–	–
Quinnipiac	September 28, 2005			48%	44%	–	–
Rasmussen	October 6, 2005			45%	38%	5%	–
Star-Ledger/Eagleton-Rutgers	October 3–6, 2005			44%	37%	–	–
Marist	October 10, 2005			44%	43%	–	–
Survey USA	October 11, 2005			49%	41%	5%	5%
Strategic Vision	October 13, 2005			46%	40%	–	–
Quinnipiac	October 19, 2005			50%	43%	–	–
Rasmussen	October 20, 2005			49%	40%	3%	–
Survey USA	October 25, 2005			50%	41%	7%	3%
Strategic Vision	November 2, 2005			48%	42%	–	–
Fairleigh-Dickinson	November 2, 2005			44%	40%	3%	13%
Quinnipiac	November 2, 2005			50%	38%	–	–
Marist College	November 4, 2005			51%	41%	–	–
Monmouth University	November 4, 2005			47%	38%	–	–
Rasmussen	November 6, 2005			44%	39%	5%	12%
Quinnipiac	November 7, 2005			52%	45%	–	–
Survey USA	November 7, 2005			50%	44%	5%	2%

Hypothetical polling

Poll source	Date(s) administered	Sample size	Margin of error	Jim McGreevey (D)	Diane Allen (R)	Chris Christie (R)	Doug Forrester (R)	Bret Schundler (R)	Other	Undecided
Quinnipiac	July 30–August 2, 2004	996 RV	±3.1%	38%	32%	–	–	–	2%	28%
Quinnipiac	July 30–August 2, 2004	996 RV	±3.1%	40%	–	27%	–	–	2%	31%
Quinnipiac	July 30–August 2, 2004	996 RV	±3.1%	41%	–	–	34%	–	3%	23%
Quinnipiac	July 30–August 2, 2004	996 RV	±3.1%	40%	–	–	–	37%	2%	20%

Poll source	Date(s) administered	Sample size	Margin of error	Richard Codey (D)	Diane Allen (R)	Chris Christie (R)	Doug Forrester (R)	Bret Schundler (R)	Other	Undecided
Quinnipiac	November 9–15, 2004	2,235 RV	±2.1%	39%	28%	–	–	–	1%	31%
Quinnipiac	November 9–15, 2004	2,235 RV	±2.1%	40%	–	27%	–	–	1%	32%
Quinnipiac	November 9–15, 2004	2,235 RV	±2.1%	39%	–	–	32%	–	1%	27%
Quinnipiac	November 9–15, 2004	2,235 RV	±2.1%	40%	–	–	–	34%	1%	25%
Quinnipiac	January 18–24, 2004	1,215 RV	±2.8%	53%	–	–	25%	–	1%	22%
Quinnipiac	January 18–24, 2004	1,215 RV	±2.8%	54%	–	–	–	26%	1%	20%

Poll source	Date(s) administered	Sample size	Margin of error	Jon Corzine (D)	Diane Allen (R)	Chris Christie (R)	Bob Franks (R)	Bret Schundler (R)	Christine Whitman (R)	Other	Undecided
Quinnipiac	August 19–23, 2004	887 RV	±3.3%	49%	24%	–	–	–	–	2%	24%
Quinnipiac	August 19–23, 2004	887 RV	±3.3%	53%	–	22%	–	–	–	1%	24%
Quinnipiac	August 19–23, 2004	887 RV	±3.3%	52%	–	–	24%	–	–	1%	23%
Quinnipiac	August 19–23, 2004	887 RV	±3.3%	48%	–	–	–	32%	–	1%	19%
Quinnipiac	August 19–23, 2004	887 RV	±3.3%	48%	–	–	–	–	37%	1%	14%
Quinnipiac	November 9–15, 2004	2,235 RV	±2.1%	51%	25%	–	–	–	–	1%	23%
Quinnipiac	November 9–15, 2004	2,235 RV	±2.1%	51%	–	24%	–	–	–	1%	23%
Quinnipiac	November 9–15, 2004	2,235 RV	±2.1%	51%	–	–	–	30%	–	1%	18%
Quinnipiac	January 18–24, 2004	1,215 RV	±2.8%	52%	–	–	–	28%	–	1%	18%
Quinnipiac	March 9–14, 2005	937 RV	±3.2%	50%	–	–	–	34%	–	1%	15%

=== Results ===
New Jersey Gubernatorial Election, 2005
Party	Candidate	Votes	%	±%
Democratic	Jon Corzine	1,224,551	53.47%	▼2.96
Republican	Doug Forrester	985,271	43.02%	▲1.34
Independent	Hector Castillo	29,452	1.29%	N/A
Libertarian	Jeffrey Pawlowski	15,417	0.67%	▲0.46
Green	Matthew Thieke	12,315	0.54%	▲0.26
Legalize Marijuana	Edward Forchion	9,137	0.40%	N/A
Independent	Michael Latigona	5,169	0.23%	
Independent	Wesley Bell	4,178	0.18%	N/A
Socialist Workers	Angela Lariscy	2,531	0.11%	▲0.06
Socialist	Constantino Rozzo	2,078	0.09%	▲0.02
Majority		239,280	10.45%	−4.31%
Turnout		2,290,099		
Democratic hold		Swing		

==== Results by county ====
County	Corzine votes	Corzine %	Forrester votes	Forrester %	Other votes	Other %
Atlantic	34,539	53.3%	28,004	43.2%	2,238	3.5%
Bergen	142,319	55.6%	108,017	42.2%	5,683	2.2%
Burlington	64,421	50.5%	57,908	45.4%	5,203	4.1%
Camden	76,955	60.4%	45,079	35.4%	5,458	4.3%
Cape May	14,375	45.2%	16,179	50.9%	1,243	3.9%
Cumberland	18,580	57.2%	12,692	39.0%	1,231	3.8%
Essex	131,312	72.7%	45,789	25.4%	3,456	1.9%
Gloucester	41,128	53.2%	33,225	43.0%	3,004	3.9%
Hudson	87,409	75.4%	25,769	22.2%	2,691	2.3%
Hunterdon	15,004	33.6%	27,521	61.6%	2,179	4.9%
Mercer	56,592	57.1%	38,871	39.2%	3,596	3.6%
Middlesex	107,176	56.0%	75,021	39.2%	9,085	4.7%
Monmouth	85,187	43.8%	101,085	51.9%	8,376	4.3%
Morris	60,986	41.3%	82,550	56.0%	3,997	2.7%
Ocean	71,953	41.6%	93,693	54.2%	7,242	4.2%
Passaic	61,803	57.9%	41,532	38.9%	3,413	3.2%
Salem	10,057	48.6%	9,608	46.5%	1,008	4.9%
Somerset	40,459	43.3%	49,406	52.8%	3,661	3.9%
Sussex	14,854	35.1%	25,283	59.7%	2,182	5.2%
Union	77,982	59.2%	50,036	38.0%	3,677	2.8%
Warren	11,460	36.8%	18,003	57.9%	1,654	5.3%

Counties that flipped from Democratic to Republican

- Monmouth (largest municipality: Middletown Township)
- Ocean (largest municipality: Lakewood)

== See also ==
- Politics of New Jersey
