= Mee Moua =

American politician (born 1969)

Mee Moua 𖬂𖬦 𖬑𖬲𖬦
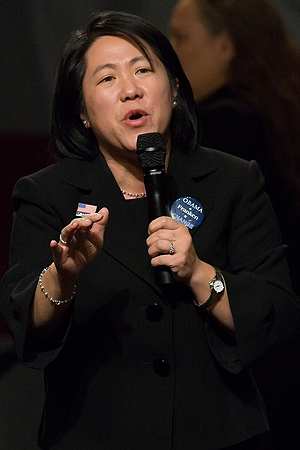

Member of the Minnesota Senate from the 67th district
- In office February 4, 2002 – January 3, 2011
- Preceded by: Randy Kelly
- Succeeded by: John Harrington

Personal details
- Born: June 30, 1969 (age 56) Xiangkhouang, Laos
- Political party: Democratic
- Spouse: Yee Chang
- Children: 3
- Education: Brown University (BA); University of Texas, Austin (MPA); University of Minnesota (JD)

Mee Moua (RPA: Mim Muas, Pahawh: 𖬂𖬦 𖬑𖬲𖬦; born June 30, 1969), is an American politician, and is the former president and executive director of the Asian Americans Advancing Justice -AAJC (Advancing Justice-AAJC) She served as the vice president for strategic impact initiatives at the Asian & Islander American Health Forum (APIAHF) from 2011–12, and as a member of the Minnesota state senate from 2002 to 2011. On February 3, 2017, Moua announced her departure from AAJC to "spend more time with her family, for her children and their future, and being the right kind of mom for them."

== Early life and education ==
Moua's father was a medic in the Vietnam War. At the end of the war, her family fled to Thailand when Moua was five years old. In 1978 her family, along with other Hmong refugees, moved to the United States. Moua graduated from Xavier High School, Appleton, Wisconsin, in 1988.

Moua obtained an undergraduate degree from Brown University, a master's degree in public policy from the Lyndon B. Johnson School of Public Affairs at the University of Texas, and a Juris Doctor from the University of Minnesota Law School.

== Minnesota State Senate ==
Moua was first elected to the Minnesota State Senate with 51 percent of the vote in a special election held in January 2002. She succeeded Senator Randy Kelly, who resigned after being elected mayor of Saint Paul. She was re-elected in November 2002 and, again, in November 2006.

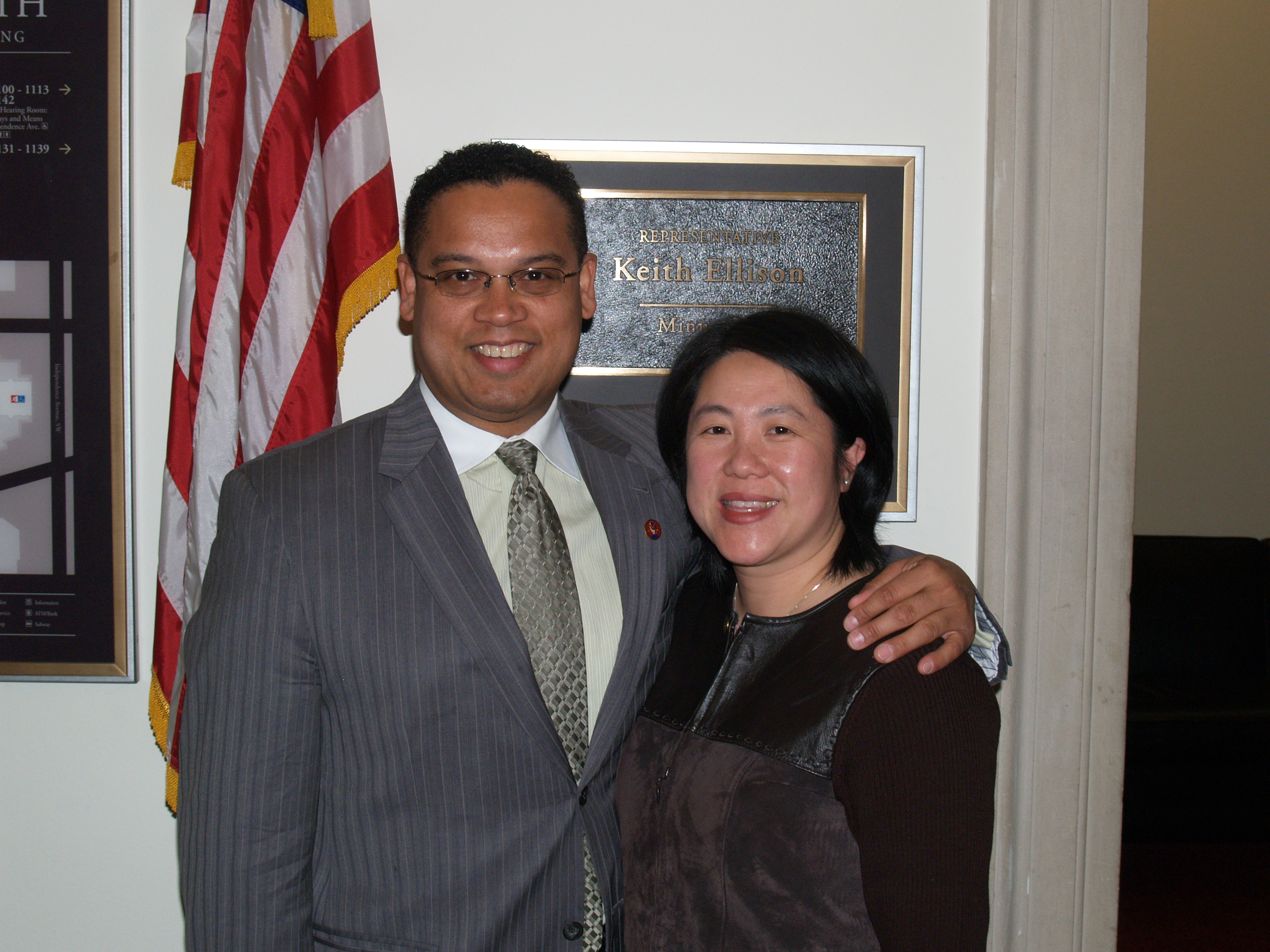
Moua with Keith Ellison in 2007

Moua became the first Hmong American woman elected to a state legislature, where she served as a member of the Minnesota Democratic-Farmer-Labor Party. At the time, District 67 included portions of the city of Saint Paul in Ramsey County

Moua chaired the Judiciary Committee and held the highest office of any Hmong American politician. She also served on the senate's Taxes and Transportation committees, and was a member of the Finance subcommittee for the Public Safety Budget Division and the Transportation Budget and Policy Division, of the Judiciary Subcommittee for Data Practices, and of the Taxes Subcommittee for the Property Tax Division.

In May 2010, Moua announced that she would not seek re-election. She said "My decision not to run was about my children and their future, and being the right kind of mom for them."

=== Campaign finance ===
In 2002, Moua spent $45,852 on her campaign, including $11,200 in campaign matching funds. Her opponent in the 2002 race for MN Senate district 67, David Racer (R), received matching funds in the amount of $7,706. In order to receive matching funds a candidate must also raise a specified amount in individual contributions and agree to campaign spending limits. Moua received individual donor contributions in the amount of $21,599 in 2006. In 2006 she only had a single donor who contributed the $500 maximum under Minnesota campaign finance laws. The majority, $18,899 of her $21,599 in individual contributions, were from individual contributors donating $100 or less. She received matching funds in the amount of $15,794. Her Republican challenger, Richard Mulkern, received $9,982 in matching funds.

=== Per diem criticism ===
In 2008, Minnesota public records indicated that Moua claimed $21,954 in per diem, the most of any senator, and effectively increased her compensation by 71 percent. In response to Moua leading the senate with her per diem claims, Republican Senator Dick Day stated "I don't know how someone like Sen. Moua who lives a few miles from the Capitol can justify to her constituents spending taxpayer dollars so recklessly." A study looking at per diem claims from 2009 to 2010, Moua topped the list at $35,136. Also in 2010, CBS News noted that Moua as the top per diem taker.

== Personal ==
She is married to Yee Chang, with whom she has three children.

== See also ==
- History of the Hmong in Minneapolis–Saint Paul
- Asian Americans Advancing Justice

Political offices
Preceded by Randy Kelly	Member of the Minnesota Senate from the 67th District; 2002 – 2011	Succeeded by John Harrington
