= 2009 Saint Paul mayoral election =

American municipal election

- November 3, 2009
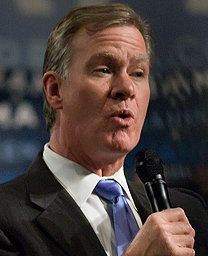

Candidate	Chris Coleman	Eva Ng
Party	Democratic (DFL)	Independent
Alliance		Republican
Popular vote	23,380	10,496
Percentage	68.67%	30.84%
Mayor before election
Chris Coleman
Democratic (DFL)
Elected Mayor
Chris Coleman
Democratic (DFL)

The 2009 Saint Paul mayoral election in the U.S. state of Minnesota held a scheduled primary election on 15 September and a general election on November 3.

== Primary Results ==
The top two getters advanced to the November 3 general election.

Saint Paul Mayoral Primary results
Party	Candidate	Votes	%
Nonpartisan	Chris Coleman (incumbent)	7,791	67.80
Nonpartisan	Eva Ng	2,967	25.81
Nonpartisan	Sharon Anderson	445	3.88
Nonpartisan	Bill Dahn	289	2.51
Total votes		11,492	100.00

== General election results ==
Saint Paul mayoral general election results
Party	Candidate	Votes	%
Nonpartisan	Chris Coleman (incumbent)	23,380	68.67
Nonpartisan	Eva Ng	10,496	30.84
Nonpartisan	Write-ins	166	.49
Total votes		34,042	100.00
