= 1996 United States Senate election in New Jersey =

- November 5, 1996
- Turnout: 72% (▲18pp)
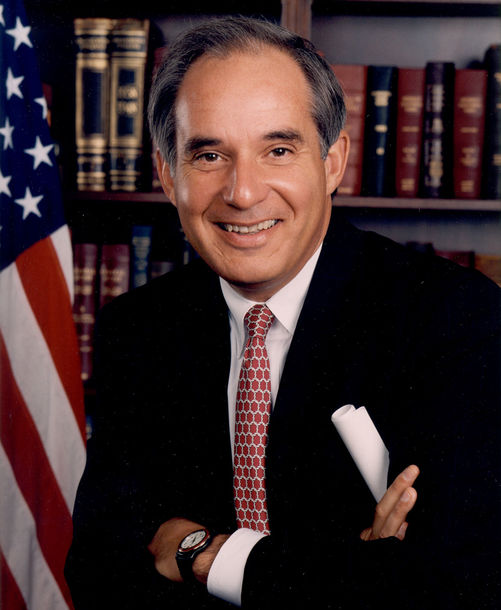

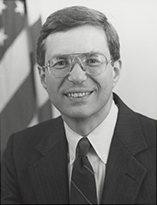
Nominee	Robert Torricelli	Dick Zimmer
Party	Democratic	Republican
Popular vote	1,519,328	1,227,817
Percentage	53.12%	42.93%
- Torricelli: 40–50% 50–60% 60–70% 70–80% 80–90% Zimmer: 40–50% 50–60% 60–70%
U.S. senator before election
Bill Bradley
Democratic
Elected U.S. Senator
Robert Torricelli
Democratic

The 1996 United States Senate election in New Jersey was held on November 5, 1996. Incumbent Democratic U.S. Senator Bill Bradley decided to retire instead of seeking a fourth term. The seat was won by Democratic congressman Robert Torricelli.

== Democratic primary ==
=== Candidates ===
- Robert Torricelli, U.S. representative from Englewood

==== Declined ====
- Rob Andrews, U.S. representative from Bellmawr
- Bill Bradley, incumbent senator since 1979 (declined August 17, 1995)
- James Florio, former governor of New Jersey
- Ray Lesniak, state senator from Elizabeth
- Jim McGreevey, state senator and mayor of Woodbridge
- Bob Menendez, U.S. representative from Union City (declined October 21, 1995)

=== Campaign ===
Senator Bill Bradley announced on August 17, 1995, that he would not stand for a fourth term.

Initial speculation in the Democratic Party centered on two North Jersey congressmen, Robert Torricelli and Robert Menendez. Torricelli, who had over $1.2 million in campaign funds on hand and had been contacting key players for several weeks in anticipation that Bradley would retire, immediately issued a statement claiming several prominent party members had urged him to run for the seat.

Menendez, who had roughly $165,000 in funds, likewise issued a statement that he would give the race "serious consideration" and "look at it in terms of what's in the best interest of the party and the state." Menendez's decision was further complicated by the fact that Torricelli's district also included part of Hudson County, and many local politicians immediately endorsed Torricelli. In September, he requested that Hudson County politicians refrain from taking sides, given the potential for a competitive primary. Menendez ultimately announced he would not challenge Torricelli in October 1995, fueling immediate speculation that he would campaign for governor in 1997.

=== Results ===
1996 Democratic U.S. Senate primary
Party	Candidate	Votes	%
Democratic	Robert Torricelli	223,444	100.00%
Total votes		223,444	100.00%

== Republican primary ==
=== Candidates ===
- Richard DuHaime, Passaic County freeholder
- Dick LaRossa, state senator from Ewing
- Dick Zimmer, U.S. representative from Delaware Township

==== Declined ====
- Michael Chertoff, former United States Attorney for the District of New Jersey
- Thomas Kean, former governor
- Marge Roukema, U.S. representative from Ridgewood
- Bret Schundler, mayor of Jersey City

=== Campaign ===
Zimmer announced his campaign before Bradley's announced retirement, and was the front-runner from the start, getting endorsements from Republican leaders across the state, including Governor Christine Todd Whitman. Bradley's retirement shook up the race, as several serious contenders, including the popular former Governor Thomas Kean, reconsidered whether to run.

Both DuHaime, a pro-life candidate, and La Rossa, a pro-gun candidate, attempted to portray Zimmer as too liberal, but Zimmer largely ignored his opponents and won the primary easily.

=== Results ===
1996 Republican U.S. Senate primary
Party	Candidate	Votes	%
Republican	Dick Zimmer	144,121	68.0%
Republican	Richard DuHaime	42,155	19.9%
Republican	Dick La Rossa	25,608	12.1%
Total votes		211,884	100.0%

== General election ==
=== Candidates ===
- Robert Torricelli, U.S. representative from Englewood (Democratic)
- Dick Zimmer, U.S. representative from Delaware Township (Republican)

=== Campaign ===
Democratic U.S. Representative Robert Torricelli won his party's primary unopposed, and Republican U.S. Representative Dick Zimmer won his party's nomination easily. Torricelli defeated Zimmer in the general election by 10 points, while President Bill Clinton simultaneously carried New Jersey by almost 18% in his reelection bid. Third-party and independent candidates carried 4.8% of the vote.

Like other Democratic candidates around the country, Torricelli tried to tie "Zig-Zag Zimmer" to House Speaker Newt Gingrich and attacked him for flip flopping on his positions on issues like Medicare, gun control and an increase in the minimum wage during the campaign. Zimmer tried to cast his opponent as a tax-and-spend liberal with ethical flaws. Military morale was also a part of the campaign.

=== Polling ===
Poll source	Date(s) administered	Sample size (Note: Key: A – all adults RV – registered voters LV – likely voters V – unclear)	Margin of error	Robert Torricelli (D)	Dick Zimmer (R)	Other/ undecided
Rutgers-Eagleton	September 6–13, 1995	804 A	±3.5%	29%	34%	37%
Rutgers-Eagleton	September 6–13, 1995	707 RV	±3.5%	29%	34%	36%
Rutgers-Eagleton	June 13–19, 1996	646 RV	±4.0%	39%	31%	31%
Rutgers-Eagleton	September 5–11, 1996	627 RV	±4.0%	38%	32%	30%
Rutgers-Eagleton	October 10–20, 1996	810 RV	±3.5%	40%	35%	25%
Rutgers-Eagleton	Oct. 29–Nov. 1, 1996	810 RV	±3.5%	41%	37%	19%
Rutgers-Eagleton	Oct. 29–Nov. 1, 1996	508 LV	±4.5%	42%	41%	17%

Hypothetical polling

Poll source	Date(s) administered	Sample size (Note: Key: A – all adults RV – registered voters LV – likely voters V – unclear)	Margin of error	Jim Florio (D)	Dick Zimmer (R)	Other/ Undecided
Rutgers-Eagleton	September 6–13, 1995	804 A	±3.5%	39%	42%	19%
Rutgers-Eagleton	September 6–13, 1995	707 RV	±4.0%	39%	43%	18%

=== Results ===
General election results
Party	Candidate	Votes	%	±%
Democratic	Robert Torricelli	1,519,328	53.12%	+3.32%
Republican	Dick Zimmer	1,227,817	42.93%	−4.47%
Independent	Richard J. Pezzullo	50,971	1.78%	N/A
Independent	Paul A. Woomer	15,183	0.53%	N/A
Independent	Olga L. Rodriguez	14,319	0.50%	N/A
Independent	Mark Wise	13,683	0.48%	N/A
Independent	Wilburt Kornegay	11,107	0.39%	N/A
Independent	Steven J. Baeli	7,749	0.27%	N/A
Total votes		2,860,157	100.00%	N/A
Democratic hold				

==== By county ====
County	Torricelli votes	Torricelli %	Zimmer votes	Zimmer %	Other votes	Other %
Atlantic	41,564	53.3%	33,416	42.8%	3,024	3.9%
Bergen	185,365	53.6%	150,655	43.6%	9,544	2.9%
Burlington	73,517	49.7%	66,450	44.9%	7,957	5.3%
Camden	105,932	59.9%	62,564	35.4%	8,260	4.7%
Cape May	17,786	43.2%	22,040	53.5%	1,378	3.4%
Cumberland	22,129	53.6%	16,886	40.9%	2,246	5.5%
Essex	160,714	67.9%	68,286	28.9%	7,608	3.2%
Gloucester	49,190	51.7%	40,105	42.2%	5,830	6.2%
Hudson	111,539	71.1%	39,220	25.0%	6,143	3.9%
Hunterdon	15,538	31.2%	31,002	62.3%	3,247	6.5%
Mercer	67,867	55.3%	48,829	39.8%	6,110	5.0%
Middlesex	133,123	54.6%	94,978	39.0%	15,512	6.4%
Monmouth	108,060	47.1%	109,173	47.6%	11,987	5.3%
Morris	73,921	39.2%	103,283	54.8%	11,378	6.0%
Ocean	91,041	47.4%	92,505	48.2%	8,527	4.4%
Passaic	74,118	54.3%	57,090	41.8%	5,407	3.9%
Salem	11,736	46.2%	12,102	47.6%	1,585	6.3%
Somerset	44,748	41.4%	58,393	54.0%	5,068	4.7%
Sussex	18,152	34.3%	30,865	58.4%	3,843	7.3%
Union	99,356	55.5%	69,781	39.0%	9,784	5.4%
Warren	13,932	38.0%	20,194	55.1%	2,523	6.9%
Total	1,519,328	52.7%	1,227,817	42.6%	136,961	4.7%

Counties that flipped from Republican to Democratic

- Bergen
- Passaic

Counties that flipped from Democratic to Republican

- Salem
- Cape May

== See also ==
- 1996 United States Senate elections
