= 2005 United States gubernatorial elections =

- November 8, 2005

3 governorships 2 states; 1 territory
	Majority party	Minority party
Party	Republican	Democratic
Seats before	28	22
Seats after	28	22
Seat change	Steady	Steady
Popular vote	1,897,598	2,250,493
Percentage	44.4%	52.66%
Seats up	0	2
Seats won	0	2
- Map of the results Democratic hold Covenant gain No election

United States gubernatorial elections were held on November 8, 2005, in the states of New Jersey and Virginia as well as in the U.S. commonwealth of the Northern Mariana Islands.

Shortly before election day, U.S. president George W. Bush returned from a trip to Latin America to provide last-minute campaigning for Virginian gubernatorial candidate Jerry W. Kilgore. After the defeat of Kilgore and Doug Forrester in New Jersey, Democrats ascribed these victories to the President's decreasing popularity. Republicans then tried to downplay these Democratic triumphs as victories exclusive to those states and their candidates. Some speculate that these two elections were harbingers of the positive momentum around the Democratic Party, and it could be said that they had some positive effect on the landmark victories in the 2006 midterm elections and the 2008 presidential election for the party. Republicans, however, maintain that the Democrats' advantage in 2005 was due simply to the fact that they were the incumbent party.

This was the first election since 1987 that no seats switched parties in a gubernatorial election and the first time this occurred in this cycle of governorships since 1985.

== Election predictions ==
Several sites and individuals publish predictions of competitive seats. These predictions look at factors such as the strength of the incumbent (if the incumbent is running for re-election), the strength of the candidates, and the partisan leanings of the state (reflected in part by the state's Cook Partisan Voting Index rating). The predictions assign ratings to each state, with the rating indicating the predicted advantage that a party has in winning that seat.

Most election predictors use:

- "tossup": no advantage
- "tilt" (used by some predictors): advantage that is not quite as strong as "lean"
- "lean": slight advantage
- "likely": significant, but surmountable, advantage
- "safe" or "solid": near-certain chance of victory

State	Incumbent	Last race	Sabato's Crystal Ball Oct 25, 2005	Result
New Jersey	Richard Codey (retired)	56.43% D	Likely D	Corzine; 53.47% D
Virginia	Mark Warner (term-limited)	52.16% D	Tossup	Kaine; 51.72% D

== Race summary ==
=== States ===
State	Incumbent	Party	First elected	Result	Candidates
New Jersey	Richard Codey	Democratic	2004 (Note: Codey took office after his predecessor (Jim McGreevey) resigned.)	Incumbent retired. New governor elected. Democratic hold.	▌ ✓ Jon Corzine (Democratic) 53.5%; ▌Doug Forrester (Republican) 43.0%; ▌Hector Castillo (Independent) 1.3%
Virginia	Mark Warner	Democratic	2001	Incumbent term-limited. New governor elected. Democratic hold.	▌ ✓ Tim Kaine (Democratic) 51.7%; ▌Jerry Kilgore (Republican) 46.0%; ▌Russ Potts (Independent) 2.2%

=== Territory ===
Territory	Incumbent	Party	First elected	Result	Candidates
Northern Mariana Islands	Juan Babauta	Republican	2001	Incumbent lost re-election. New governor elected. Covenant gain.	▌ ✓ Benigno Fitial (Covenant) 28.0%; ▌Heinz Hofschneider (Independent) 27.3%; ▌Juan Babauta (Republican) 26.6%; ▌Froilan Tenorio (Democratic) 18.1%

== Closest races ==
States where the margin of victory was under 1%:

1. Northern Mariana Islands, 0.6%

States where the margin of victory was under 10%:

1. Virginia, 5.7%

== Virginia ==
2005 Virginia gubernatorial election
- November 8, 2005
- Turnout: 45.0% ▼1.4
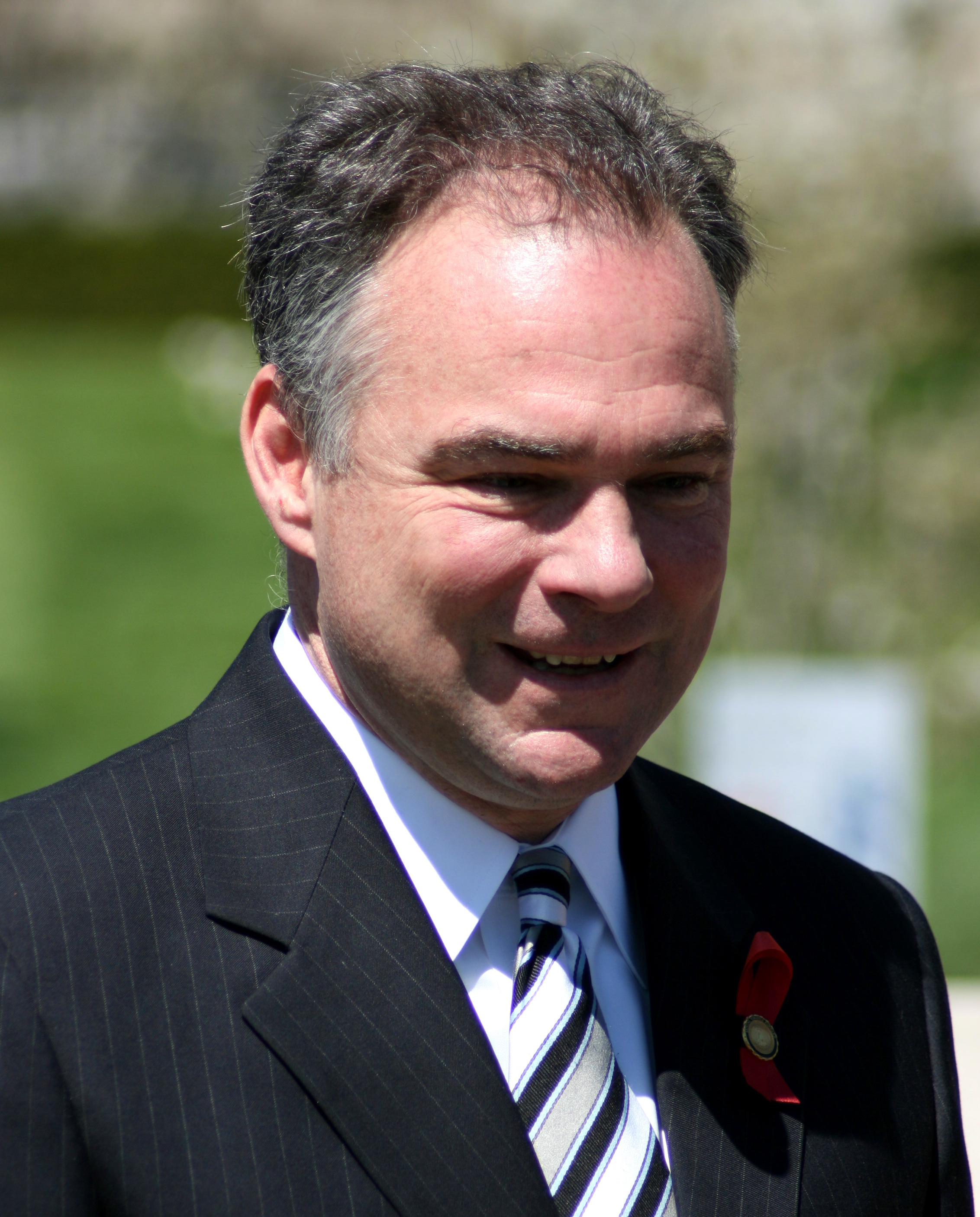

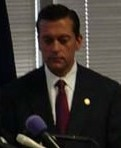
Nominee	Tim Kaine	Jerry Kilgore
Party	Democratic	Republican
Popular vote	1,025,942	912,327
Percentage	51.7%	46.0%
- County and independent city results Kaine: 40–50% 50–60% 60–70% 70–80% 80–90% Kilgore: 40–50% 50–60% 60–70% 70–80%
Governor before election
Mark Warner
Democratic
Elected Governor
Tim Kaine
Democratic

The 2005 Virginia gubernatorial election was held on November 8, 2005, to elect the governor of Virginia. The Democratic nominee, Lieutenant Governor Tim Kaine, the son-in-law to Linwood Holton, won the election. Virginia is the only state in the United States to prohibit governors from serving successive terms, meaning that the popular incumbent, Mark Warner, could not run for reelection.

While the previous Democratic governor, Mark Warner, was credited with doing especially well for a Democrat in rural areas of the commonwealth, Kaine's win featured surprising triumphs in traditionally Republican areas such as Virginia Beach, Chesapeake, and the Northern Virginia suburbs of Prince William County and Loudoun County, as well as impressive showings in Democratic strongholds such as Richmond and Norfolk. This is the most recent election in which a Virginia governor and lieutenant governor of opposite parties were elected.

== New Jersey ==
2005 New Jersey gubernatorial election
- November 8, 2005
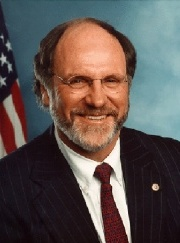

Nominee	Jon Corzine	Doug Forrester
Party	Democratic	Republican
Popular vote	1,224,551	985,271
Percentage	53.5%	43.0%
- County results Corzine: 40–50% 50–60% 60–70% 70–80% Forrester: 50–60% 60–70%
Governor before election
Richard Codey
Democratic
Elected Governor
Jon Corzine
Democratic

The 2005 New Jersey gubernatorial election was a race to determine the governor of New Jersey. It was held on November 8, 2005. Democratic governor Richard Codey, who replaced Governor Jim McGreevey in 2004 after his resignation, did not run for election for a full term of office.

The primary election was held on June 7, 2005. U.S. senator Jon Corzine won the Democratic nomination without serious opposition. Former West Windsor Mayor Doug Forrester received the Republican nomination with a plurality of 36%. Corzine defeated Forrester in the general election. New Jersey is reliably Democratic at the federal level, but this was the first time since 1977 in which Democrats won more than one consecutive gubernatorial election in the state. This was the first time since 1965 that a Democrat won a gubernatorial race without Ocean County, and the first since 1961 that they did so without Monmouth County.

The 2005 general election also saw a public referendum question on the ballot for the voters to decide whether to create a position of lieutenant governor, alter the state's order of succession, and whether the state's first lieutenant governor would be chosen in the subsequent gubernatorial election held in 2009. The question passed by a tally of 836,134 votes (56.1%) to 655,333 (43.9%). As of 2022, this is the most recent time that Salem County voted for the Democratic candidate in a gubernatorial race.

== Territories ==
=== Northern Marina Islands ===
2005 United States gubernatorial elections
- 5 November 2005
- Gubernatorial election
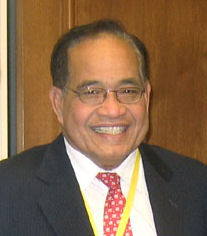

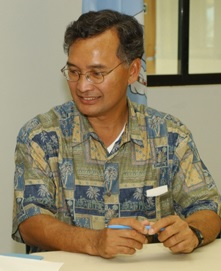

Candidate	Benigno Fitial	Heinz Hofschneider
Party	Covenant	Independent
Running mate	Timothy Villagomez	Diego Benavente
Popular vote	3,766	3,682
Percentage	27.95%	27.33%
Candidate	Juan Babauta	Froilan Tenorio
Party	Republican	Democratic
Running mate	David M. Apatang	Antonio Santos
Popular vote	3,584	2,440
Percentage	26.60%	18.11%
Governor before election
Juan Babauta
Republican
Elected Governor
Benigno Fitial
Covenant
- House election
- All 18 seats in the House of Representatives; 9 seats needed for a majority
Party	Seats
Covenant	7
Republican	7
Democratic	2
Independents	2
This lists parties that won seats. See the complete results below.
- Senate election
- All 9 seats in the Senate; 5 seats needed for a majority
Party	Seats
Covenant	3
Republican	3
Democratic	2
Independents	1
This lists parties that won seats. See the complete results below.
