= Douglas Forrester =

American politician (born 1953)

Doug Forrester

Mayor of West Windsor
- In office 1981–1982

Personal details
- Born: Douglas Robert Forrester; January 24, 1953 (age 73) Glendale, California, U.S.
- Party: Republican
- Spouse: Andrea Howard
- Children: 3
- Education: Harvard University (BA); Princeton Theological Seminary (MDiv)

Douglas Robert Forrester (born January 24, 1953) is an American businessman and politician from New Jersey. He was the Republican nominee for U.S. Senator from New Jersey in 2002, and the Republican nominee for Governor of New Jersey in 2005. Forrester was defeated by his two Democratic opponents, Frank Lautenberg and then-U.S. Senator Jon Corzine, respectively. Forrester currently serves as the president of Integrity Health, a health benefits management firm.

== Early life ==
Forrester is the youngest of five children. His father never graduated from high school, but worked his way through the ranks at Lockheed Martin, while his mother died when he was four. His father remarried.

Forrester excelled in water polo at high school in Santa Clara, California. He was graduated cum laude from Harvard in 1975, having studied philosophy and government.

Forrester then moved to New Jersey to study at the Princeton Theological Seminary, where he earned a master's degree in theology and politics. He then married childhood friend Andrea Howard, and moved to West Windsor. Forrester and his wife have three children.

== Career ==
=== Early career ===
Forrester was elected as a township committeeman in West Windsor at age 26, and served as mayor from 1981 to 1982. In the 1980s, Forrester became Assistant State Treasurer in the Kean Administration, and later went on to direct the pension system for state employees. In 1990, Forrester founded BeneCard Services, Inc., a pharmacy benefit management firm that provides prescription drug coverage primarily to public sector entities. In a financial disclosure statement in 2002, Forrester reported his 51 percent share in the company to be worth over $50 million. In 2003, Forrester started Heartland Fidelity with Robert Ullman, his partner in BeneCard.

=== 2002 U.S. Senate election ===
Forrester ran for the United States Senate in 2002 with the endorsement of President George W. Bush. Forrester's original opponent, Robert Torricelli, abandoned his re-election bid under accusations of accepting improper "gifts". While he was never prosecuted, Torricelli withdrew after he fell far behind in the polls due to an admonishment by the Senate.

In the case of The New Jersey Democratic Party v. Samson, 175 N.J. 178 (2002), Forrester sued to stop Democratic Party efforts to replace Torricelli on the ballot with recently retired former Senator Frank Lautenberg. Forrester argued that the state statute generally forbidding the replacement of a candidate on the ballot within 51 days of an election (N.J.S.A 19:13-20) should be obeyed because "here, there are really no extraordinary facts" such as "death and incapacitation". Furthermore, Torricelli was only withdrawing from the race, not his current Senate seat. The Democrats argued that there was still time to notify all the absentee voters and Torricelli had the right to withdraw. The County Clerks agreed that a substitution was logistically possible if it occurred immediately but might cost up to $800,000.

During arguments, the New Jersey Supreme Court justices questioned whether this precedent would be abused in the future. Justice James R. Zazzali asked, "Will there be a parade of candidates removed at the whim of party leaders because the candidate is collapsing?" The justices expressed concern for absentee voters and the public interest in having an optimal choice of candidates.

Ultimately, the justices ruled unanimously to allow the ballot replacement. Peter Verniero, a Republican appointed by Christine Todd Whitman, wrote that the statute in question "does not preclude the possibility of a vacancy occurring within 51 days of the election." He also wrote, "We see what advantage this has for Mr. Forrester; we fail to see what advantage this has for the people of New Jersey." In deciding to interpret the deadline as it did, the Court cited Kilmurray v. Gilbert, 10 N.J. 435 (1952) and Catania v. Haberle, 123 N.J. 438. The Democrats were ordered to cover the extra costs incurred by the state.

Three weeks later, Forrester was defeated by Lautenberg 54-44 percent.

=== 2005 gubernatorial election ===
According to the Associated Press, Forrester was being asked to run for governor in autumn 2004. He initially decided to take care of his daughter Briana, who had suffered a brain hemorrhage and been diagnosed with cancer. That November, however, she encouraged him to run. (As of April 2005, her cancer is in remission).

On November 23, 2004, Forrester formally announced his gubernatorial candidacy at Washington Crossing State Park. He announced that he would not accept public funding for his campaign. His primary competitor in the primaries was Bret Schundler, a former gubernatorial candidate and former Mayor of Jersey City, New Jersey. After vote counting problems in Bergen County, a swing county in the primary election, Forrester broke even as planned with Schundler, giving him a 36-31 percent statewide victory over Schundler, setting Forrester up for his race against Democratic Party candidate and US Senator Jon Corzine.

New Jersey law has prohibited insurance companies, or people with a majority interest in one, from making political donations. Forrester's campaign was substantially funded by donations from himself, leading to claims that Forrester violated these regulations. Forrester contended that because Heartland Insurance had been incorporated in Washington, D.C., it was not covered by the restrictions. Acting Banking and Insurance Commissioner Donald Bryan, who had been reappointed by Democratic Governor Jim McGreevey, issued an opinion in August 2005 stating that Forrester had not broken the law.

On November 8, Forrester was defeated by Sen. Jon Corzine 53.5-43 percent.

=== Integrity Health ===
Forrester currently serves as president of Integrity Health, a health benefits management firm that focuses on early prevention and claims transparency. The firm provides health benefit programs for public and private sector employees, including school districts and municipalities.

Integrity Health uses a program to update members on the status of their health and remind them when it is time to get necessary tests, screenings, and check-ups. The focus on preventive care helps to control costs.

The company proposes to streamline the healthcare billing and claims resolution process, while providing detailed reporting of how healthcare dollars are spent.

Forrester founded the Princeton, New Jersey firm after his daughter experienced a traumatic brain injury.

== Electoral history ==
United States Senate election in New Jersey, 2002
| Party | Candidate | Votes | % | ±% |
|---|---|---|---|---|
| Republican | Doug Forrester | 928,439 | 44 | |
| Democratic | Frank Lautenberg | 1,138,193 | 54 | |

New Jersey Gubernatorial Election 2005
| Party | Candidate | Votes | % | ±% |
|---|---|---|---|---|
| Republican | Doug Forrester | 985,271 | 43.0 | |
| Democratic | Jon Corzine | 1,224,551 | 53.5 | |

== Sources ==
- "Democrats score big". (Nov. 10, 2005). New Straits Times, p. 29.
- Newmarker, Chris (Nov. 5, 2005). "N.J. Governor's Race Hits New Lows". Associated Press.
- "Ex-hopeful for governor starts health benefits firm". (Oct. 18, 2008). "Ex-hopeful for governor starts health benefits firm". The Record.

Party political offices
| Preceded by Dick Zimmer | Republican nominee for U.S. Senator from New Jersey (Class 2); 2002 | Succeeded by Dick Zimmer |
| Preceded by Bret Schundler | Republican nominee for Governor of New Jersey; 2005 | Succeeded by Chris Christie |
