= Ujamaa Place =

Non-profit organization in St. Paul, Minnesota, United States

- Founded: 2010
- Type: (IRS exemption status): 501(c)(3)
- Purpose: Education, Employment, Ending recidivism
- Location: Saint Paul, Minnesota, United States
- Coordinates: 44°57′26.61″N 93°10′46.26″W
- Region served: Saint Paul area
- Method: Donations and Grants
- Key people: Otis Zanders, CEO
- Website: ujamaaplace.org
- Formerly called: Awali Place

Ujamaa Place is a non-profit organization, it was launched in 2009 to fill a gap in social welfare programming and services for African-American men in the age group of between 17 and 28 years old in St. Paul, Minnesota. Ujamaa Place took over the services offered by a previous form of the program, Awali Place. Ujamaa Place replaced Awali, when Awali lost its funding due to the 2009 budget cuts. Ujamaa Place received its non-profit status in 2010.

== History ==
In 2009, a group of leaders in the St. Paul African-American community, including the St. Paul Chief of Police John Harrington, executive director of the St. Paul YWCA Billy Collins, St. Paul City Council Member Melvin Carter III, Thad Wilderson, Mary K. Boyd, the NAACP, and several members of the Black Ministerial Alliance and the Council on Black Minnesotans, identified that there was a significant gap in social welfare delivery system and programming for its population in Saint Paul, which needed immediate attention. The organizers realized that without intervention from a program like Ujamaa Place, this would become a “lost generation” of young men who either die at a young age, or are incarcerated for most of their lives.

A similar program to Ujamaa Place was developed by Twin Cities RISE! (TCR!) and piloted in St. Paul in 2008 and part of 2009. In 2009, TCR! determined that the program (Awali Place) would be part of a budget reduction since it was not closely aligned with their core mission. A group of concerned citizens (several of whom are mentioned earlier) decided to collaborate and establish Ujamaa Place to further develop the program and build on the good work conducted within the Awali Place program. Ujamaa Place received 501(c)(3) nonprofit status in April 2010 and opened its doors at 1885 University Avenue in St. Paul in November 2010.

== Program ==
Ujamaa Place programming is made available at no cost to participants, but it is a program that demands mutual accountability. It helps men develop the skills it takes to be a successful individual, father, employee, and citizen.

Trained coaches develop high-context relationships that are individualized for each participant, this rather than applying a prescribed approach to all. Coaches often overcome similar obstacles in their own lives, providing inspiration and models of empowerment for participants.

To graduate from the program, an Ujamaa Place participant must demonstrate job skills, empowerment skills and life skills through the following:

- Completion of his GED
- Demonstrated use of Empowerment Skills in his daily life
- Remained drug-free
- No recent criminal offenses
- Secured stable housing
- Held a job for a minimum of three months

Ujamaa Place is not a holding place, but a place of new beginnings and transition. Graduates continue to successfully hold jobs and are enrolled in job training programs in which they gain the skills necessary to secure high skill jobs with benefits.

== Board of directors ==
- Mary K. Boyd, Saint Paul Public Schools (retired)
- Billy Collins, YWCA Saint Paul
- John Couchman, The Saint Paul Foundation (retired)
- John Harrington, Minnesota Senate
- Rick Heydinger, Public Strategies Group (retired)
- Jim Miller, Ecolab
- Bill Sands, Western Bancshares, Inc.
- Bill Svrluga, WJS Consulting Group
- Reverend David Van Dyke, House of Hope Presbyterian Church
- Reverend Carl Walker, Morningstar Missionary Baptist Church
- Thad Wilderson, Thad Wilderson & Associates
- Otis Zanders, Minnesota Department of Corrections (retired)

== Development Strategy Committee ==
- Ellen Brown, The Brown Partners, Inc.
- Pat Cook, Minnesota Public Radio (retired)
- Terry Crowley, Crowley, White & Helmer, Inc. (retired)
- Joseph Ellis, Wells Fargo
- John Harrington, Minnesota Senate
- Rick Heydinger, Public Strategies Group (retired)
- Jim Miller, Ecolab
- Bill Sands, Western Bancshares, Inc.
- Bill Svrluga, WJS Consulting Group
- Otis Zanders, Minnesota Department of Corrections (retired)
