= 2005 Saint Paul mayoral election =

- November 8, 2005
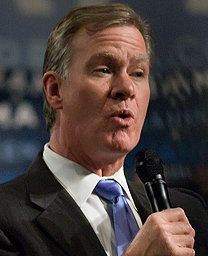

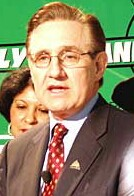
Candidate	Chris Coleman	Randy Kelly
Party	Democratic (DFL)	Democratic (DFL)
Popular vote	40,601	18,203
Percentage	68.63%	30.78%
Mayor before election
Randy Kelly
Democratic (DFL)
Elected Mayor
Chris Coleman
Democratic (DFL)

The 2005 Saint Paul mayoral election in the U.S. state of Minnesota held a scheduled primary election on September 13 and a general election on November 8.

== Background ==
Kelly had been the mayor of Saint Paul, Minnesota since 2001. He won the office in 2001 by just 403 votes in a tight race with Jay Benanav, a city councilman. As mayor, he was noted for his efforts to increase the minimum wage and create and retain high-paying jobs.

During Kelly's term in office, his political views and several appointments generated controversy. In 2004, he rankled fellow Democrats by endorsing and campaigning for President George W. Bush's re-election. According to critics, his conservative views, which may have been intended to garner support from Republicans and independents, undermined his constituent base in the Democratic Party. An unsuccessful grassroots campaign to recall him was launched shortly after his announcement in support of Bush's re-election effort.

In 2005, one of Kelly's appointees, Sia Lo, head of the criminal division of the city attorney's office, was reported to be at the center of an investigation into alleged corruption in a city development deal which focused on a new Hmong funeral home on the city's West Side. Lo was never charged.

== Primary results ==
The top two vote-getters advanced to the November 8 general election.

Saint Paul mayoral primary results
Party	Candidate	Votes	%
Nonpartisan	Chris Coleman	13,041	51.80
Nonpartisan	Randy Kelly (incumbent)	6,740	26.77
Nonpartisan	Elizabeth Dickinson	4,905	19.48
Nonpartisan	Sharon Anderson	216	.85
Nonpartisan	Nick Tschida	135	.53
Nonpartisan	Bill Dhan	59	.23
Nonpartisan	Glen Mansfield	40	.15
Nonpartisan	Jacob Perasso	36	.14
Total votes		25,172	100.00

== General Election Results ==
Saint Paul General Election Results
Party	Candidate	Votes	%
Nonpartisan	Chris Coleman	40,601	68.63
Nonpartisan	Randy Kelly (incumbent)	18,203	30.78
Nonpartisan	Write-ins	350	.59
Total votes		59,154	100.00
