= 2002 United States Senate election in New Jersey =

- November 5, 2002
- Turnout: 46% (▼26pp)
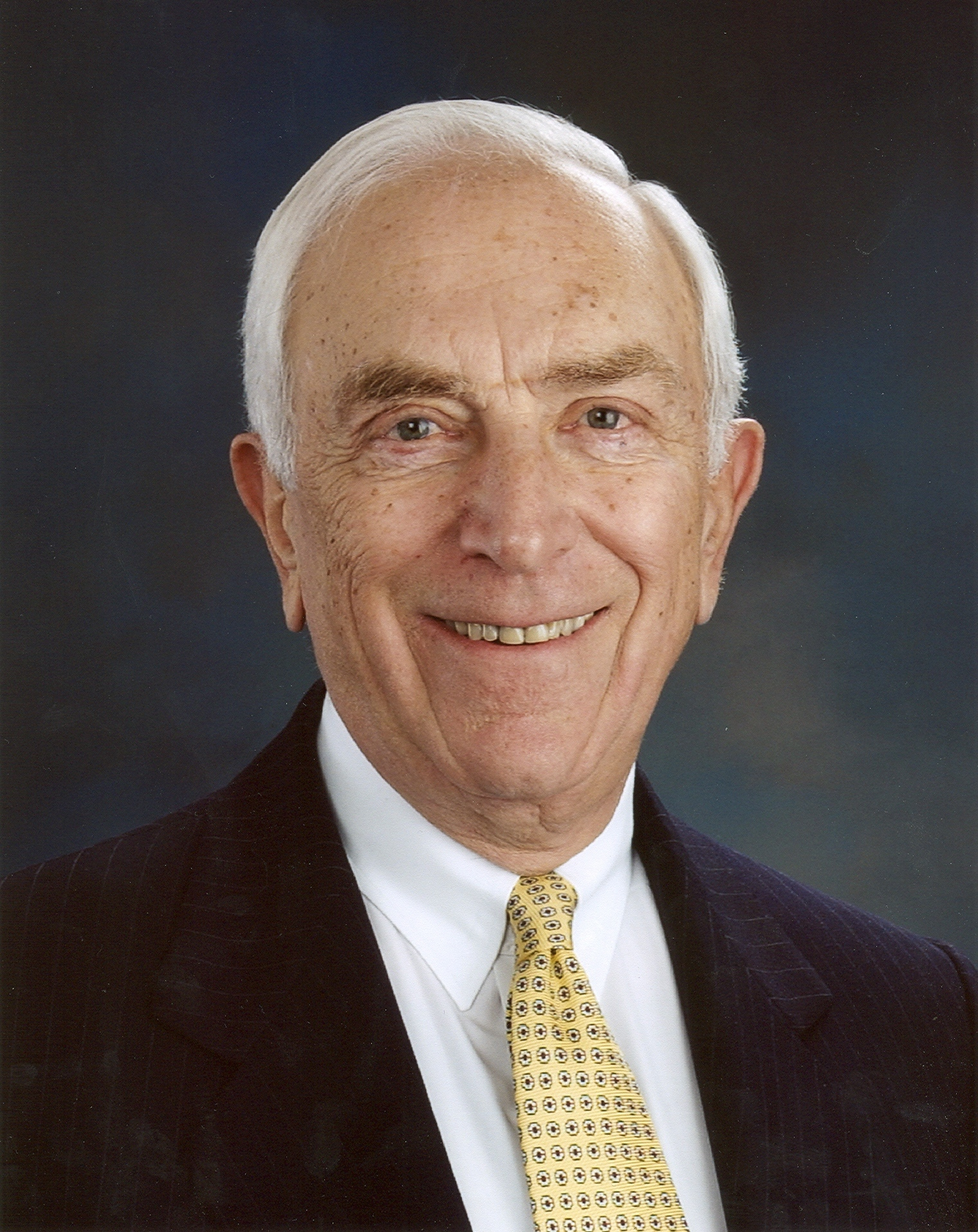

Nominee	Frank Lautenberg (replacing Robert Torricelli)	Doug Forrester
Party	Democratic	Republican
Popular vote	1,138,193	928,439
Percentage	53.88%	43.95%
- Lautenberg: 40–50% 50–60% 60–70% 70–80% 80–90% Forrester: 50–60% 60–70%
U.S. senator before election
Robert Torricelli
Democratic
Elected U.S. Senator
Frank Lautenberg
Democratic

The 2002 United States Senate election in New Jersey was held on November 5, 2002. Former U.S. senator Frank Lautenberg was elected over Republican businessman Doug Forrester. Democratic incumbent Robert Torricelli dropped out of the race on September 30 in the face of ethical misconduct allegations, a formal admonishment by the Senate Ethics Committee, and poor public polling.

Primary elections were held on June 4. Torricelli, the target of a federal ethics probe, was unopposed for the Democratic nomination. Forrester won a competitive Republican primary over state senators Diane Allen and John Matheussen. Another leading candidate, Essex County executive James W. Treffinger, dropped out on April 22 amid a federal criminal investigation for bribery.

In the general election, Torricelli steadily fell behind Forrester in public polling and dropped out in late September. The New Jersey Democratic State Committee replaced him with Frank Lautenberg, who had held the state's other Senate seat from 1982 until 2001. Forrester's campaign filed legal proceedings aimed at forcing Torricelli's name to remain on the ballot, but the New Jersey Supreme Court ruled unanimously on October 2 that Lautenberg could replace Torricelli.

On election day, Lautenberg defeated Forrester by a 9.9 percentage point margin to win a fourth, non-consecutive term as U.S. senator. At 78, Lautenberg became the oldest non-incumbent to win a Senate election. Lautenberg became the state's junior senator for the second time when he was sworn in on January 3, 2003, as his previous terms in the Senate were not counted for purposes of seniority.

This was the last time a replacement nominee in a Senate race went on to win the general election until the 2026 United States Senate election in Maine.

== Democratic primary ==
=== Candidates ===
- Robert Torricelli, incumbent U.S. senator since 1997

=== Results ===
Although Torricelli would later withdraw from the race, he was unopposed for the Democratic nomination on June 4.

2002 Democratic U.S. Senate primary
Party	Candidate	Votes	%
Democratic	Robert Torricelli (incumbent)	181,468	100.00%
Total votes		181,468	100.00%

== Republican primary ==
=== Candidates ===
- Diane Allen, state senator from Moorestown since 1998
- Doug Forrester, businessman and former mayor of West Windsor (1981–82)
- John J. Matheussen, state senator from Mantua since 1992

==== Withdrew ====
- Guy R. Gregg, assemblyman from Washington Township (Morris County) and former Assembly majority whip (withdrew April 8; endorsed Treffinger)
- Robert Ray, former Whitewater controversy special counsel (withdrew April 8)
- James W. Treffinger, Essex County executive and candidate for Senate in 2000 (withdrew April 22)

==== Declined ====
- Lewis Eisenberg, former chairman of the Port Authority of New York and New Jersey
- Steve Forbes, publisher of Forbes magazine and candidate for president in 1996 and 2000
- Thomas Kean, former governor of New Jersey (1982–90)

=== Campaign ===
Many Republicans were eager to take on Torricelli, who was the subject of a federal investigation into his fundraising practices in his 1996 election.

James W. Treffinger became the first candidate to officially announce his campaign in November 2001, shortly after the state elections which ended a decade of Republican rule. Much speculation at the time revolved around popular former Governor Thomas Kean, whom party chair Joe Kyrillos referred to as a "star player."

At the April 8 filing deadline, the two trailing candidates, Assemblyman Guy Gregg and attorney Robert Ray, dropped out of the race. Gregg endorsed Treffinger, who seemingly became the front-runner for the nomination. However, Treffinger's campaign collapsed less than two weeks later, when his office was raided by federal agents as part of an investigation into his acceptance of campaign contributions in exchange for public contracts. Many state and national Republicans withdrew their support from Treffinger. Four days after the raid, he withdrew from the race.

=== Results ===
2002 Republican U.S. Senate primary
Party	Candidate	Votes	%
Republican	Doug Forrester	97,275	44.56%
Republican	Diane Allen	80,476	36.87%
Republican	John J. Matheussen	40,549	18.58%
Total votes		218,300	100.00%

=== Aftermath ===
Treffinger was arrested in October and indicted by U.S. Attorney Chris Christie on twenty counts of extortion, fraud, obstructing a federal investigation, and conspiracy. He pleaded guilty in May 2003 to one count of obstruction and one count of mail fraud.

== General election ==
=== Candidates ===
- Doug Forrester, businessman and former mayor of West Windsor (Republican)
- Ted Glick (Green)
- Frank Lautenberg, former U.S. senator (1982–2001) (Democratic)
- Elizabeth Macron (Libertarian)
- Greg Pason, national secretary of the Socialist Party USA and perennial candidate (Socialist)
- Norman E. Wahner (Conservative)

==== Withdrew ====
- Robert Torricelli, incumbent U.S. senator since 1997 (Democratic)

=== Campaign ===
On July 30, the United States Senate Ethics Committee issued a letter which "severely admonished" Torricelli for failing to disclose gifts he received and accepted from a donor. In late September, evidence was revealed about the relationship between Torricelli and the donor, and the donor was interviewed on WNBC in a segment dubbed "The Prisoner and the Politician". Torricelli dropped out of the race on September 30 due to ethical problems and poor poll numbers against Forrester, a relatively unknown opponent.

==== Replacement nominee and lawsuit ====
Various candidates were sought after to replace Torricelli, including former U.S. senator Bill Bradley and current U.S. representatives Bob Menendez and Frank Pallone. The New Jersey Democratic State Committee eventually chose former U.S. senator Frank Lautenberg as the party's candidate. In The New Jersey Democratic Party v. Samson, 175 N.J. 178 (2002), Forrester sued to prevent Lautenberg from replacing Torricelli on the ballot. On October 2, the New Jersey Supreme Court ruled unanimously that the Democratic Party had the right to nominate Lautenberg.

=== Endorsements ===
Forrester received the endorsement of President George W. Bush.

=== Debates ===
- Complete video of debate, September 5, 2002
- Complete video of debate, September 12, 2002
- Complete video of debate, October 30, 2002
- Complete video of debate, November 2, 2002

=== Predictions ===
Source	Ranking	As of
Sabato's Crystal Ball	Lean D	November 4, 2002

=== Polling ===
Poll source	Date(s) administered	Sample size (Note: Key: A – all adults RV – registered voters LV – likely voters V – unclear)	Margin of error	Bob Torricelli (D)	Doug Forrester (R)	Other / Undecided
Quinnipiac	January 22–28, 2002	1,018 RV	±3.1%	50%	26%	22%
Quinnipiac	February 28–March 4, 2002	1,005 RV	±3.1%	53%	26%	21%
Quinnipiac	April 17–22, 2002	837 RV	±3.4%	47%	29%	24%
Rutgers-Eagleton	June 5–9, 2002	626 RV	±4.0%	43%	29%	21%
Quinnipiac	June 11–17, 2002	736 RV	±3.6%	44%	36%	21%
Quinnipiac	July 31–August 6, 2002	879 RV	±3.3%	37%	37%	28%
Torricelli internal	August 2002	? LV	?	40%	40%	20%
Forrester internal	August 19, 2002	? LV	?	35%	47%	18%
SurveyUSA	August 21, 2002	978 RV	±3.3%	37%	48%	15%
Rutgers-Eagleton	September 3–8, 2002	537 LV	±4.0%	37%	33%	30%
Quinnipiac	September 3–10, 2002	1,341 LV	±2.7%	45%	41%	14%
Quinnipiac	September 3–10, 2002	861 LV	±3.3%	44%	48%	9%
Rutgers-Eagleton	September 18–25, 2002	547 RV		34%	41%	26%
Poll source	Date(s) administered	Sample size	Margin of error	Frank Lautenberg (D)	Doug Forrester (R)	Other / Undecided
Quinnipiac	October 2–6, 2002	514 LV	4.3%	49%	45%	6%
Rutgers-Eagleton	October 3–6, 2002	801 A	±4.0%	46%	40%	14%
Rutgers-Eagleton	October 3–6, 2002	530 LV	±4.5%	44%	44%	12%
Rutgers-Eagleton	October 13–17, 2002	793 RV	±3.5%	44%	35%	22%
Quinnipiac	October 16–20, 2002	603 LV	±4.0%	52%	43%	4%
NYT–CBS News	October 19–24, 2002	772 RV	±?	46%	39%	21% (Note: 5% were for "other candidates.")
SurveyUSA	October 27–29, 2002	732 LV	±3.7%	51%	41%	8%
Rutgers-Eagleton	October 27–31, 2002	909 RV	±3.5%	51%	34%	14%
Rutgers-Eagleton	October 27–31, 2002	458 LV	±3.5%	52%	40%	8%
Quinnipiac	October 28–November 3, 2002	574 LV	±4.1%	50%	39%	11%
Research 2000/The Record	November 1–2, 2002	600 LV	±4.0%	51%	42%	8%

Hypothetical polling

with Diane Allen

Poll source	Date(s) administered	Sample size	Margin of error	Robert Torricelli (D)	Diane Allen (R)	Undecided
Quinnipiac	February 28–March 4, 2002	1,005 RV	±3.1%	49%	30%	20%
Quinnipiac	April 17–22, 2002	837 RV	±3.4%	44%	32%	24%

with Guy Gregg

Poll source	Date(s) administered	Sample size	Margin of error	Robert Torricelli (D)	Guy Gregg (R)	Undecided
Quinnipiac	January 22–28, 2002	1,018 RV	±3.1%	51%	25%	24%
Quinnipiac	February 28–March 4, 2002	1,005 RV	±3.1%	52%	26%	21%

with John Matheussen

Poll source	Date(s) administered	Sample size	Margin of error	Robert Torricelli (D)	John Matheussen (R)	Undecided
Quinnipiac	February 28–March 4, 2002	1,005 RV	±3.1%	52%	28%	20%
Quinnipiac	April 17–22, 2002	837 RV	±3.4%	46%	31%	23%

with Robert Ray

Poll source	Date(s) administered	Sample size	Margin of error	Robert Torricelli (D)	Robert Ray (R)	Undecided
Quinnipiac	February 28–March 4, 2002	1,005 RV	±3.1%	53%	28%	20%

with James Treffinger

Poll source	Date(s) administered	Sample size	Margin of error	Robert Torricelli (D)	James Treffinger (R)	Undecided
Quinnipiac	January 22–28, 2002	1,018 RV	±3.1%	49%	28%	23%
Quinnipiac	February 28–March 4, 2002	1,005 RV	±3.1%	51%	27%	21%
Quinnipiac	April 17–22, 2002	837 RV	±3.4%	45%	29%	26%

=== Results ===
2002 United States Senate election in New Jersey
Party	Candidate	Votes	%	±%
Democratic	Frank Lautenberg	1,138,193	53.88%	+0.76%
Republican	Doug Forrester	928,439	43.95%	+1.02%
Green	Ted Glick	24,308	1.15%	N/A
Libertarian	Elizabeth Macron	12,558	0.59%	N/A
Conservative	Norman E. Wahner	6,404	0.30%	N/A
Socialist	Greg Pason	2,702	0.13%	N/A
Total votes		2,112,604	100.00%	
Democratic hold				

==== By county ====
County	Frank Lautenberg December		Doug Forrester Republican		Various candidates Other parties		Margin		Total votes cast
County	#	%	#	%	#	%	#	%	Total votes cast
Atlantic	33,277	53.85%	27,236	44.07%	1,288	2.08%	6,041	9.78%	61,801
Bergen	139,241	54.81%	110,272	43.40%	4,547	1.79%	28,969	11.41%	254,060
Burlington	61,476	51.71%	54,846	46.13%	2,563	2.16%	6,630	5.58%	118,885
Camden	77,640	63.21%	41,628	33.89%	3,564	2.90%	36,012	29.32%	122,832
Cape May	14,760	44.59%	17,751	53.63%	587	1.77%	-2,991	-9.04%	33,098
Cumberland	17,020	54.64%	13,189	42.34%	943	3.03%	3,831	12.30%	31,152
Essex	114,624	71.09%	44,072	27.33%	2,541	1.58%	70,552	43.76%	161,237
Gloucester	41,009	55.47%	31,140	42.12%	1,776	2.40%	9,869	13.35%	73,925
Hudson	74,127	72.76%	25,194	24.73%	2,560	2.51%	48,933	48.03%	101,881
Hunterdon	13,890	34.57%	25,124	62.53%	1,163	2.90%	-11,234	-27.96%	40,177
Mercer	53,675	57.59%	37,195	39.91%	2,338	2.51%	16,480	17.68%	93,208
Middlesex	98,019	58.64%	65,128	38.96%	4,009	2.40%	32,891	19.68%	167,156
Monmouth	79,730	46.24%	88,424	51.28%	4,278	2.48%	-8,694	-5.04%	172,432
Morris	55,592	40.29%	79,984	57.97%	2,406	1.74%	-29,640	-17.68%	137,982
Ocean	69,328	45.24%	80,592	52.59%	3,315	2.16%	-11,264	-7.35%	153,235
Passaic	53,275	56.14%	39,822	41.96%	1,806	1.90%	13,453	14.18%	94,903
Salem	10,232	50.47%	9,487	46.79%	556	2.74%	745	3.68%	20,275
Somerset	36,476	43.42%	45,590	54.26%	1,951	2.32%	-9,114	-10.84%	84,017
Sussex	13,673	34.34%	25,099	63.04%	1,045	2.62%	-11,426	-28.70%	39,817
Union	70,085	57.73%	49,243	40.56%	2,074	1.71%	20,842	17.17%	121,402
Warren	11,044	36.16%	17,423	57.05%	2,074	6.79%	-6,379	-20.89%	30,541
Totals	1,138,193	53.88%	928,439	43.95%	45,972	2.17%	209,754	9.93%	2,112,604

Counties that flipped from Republican to Democratic

- Salem (largest municipality: Pennsville Township)

== See also ==
- 2002 United States Senate elections
