= Chris Coleman (politician) =

American politician and lawyer (born 1961)

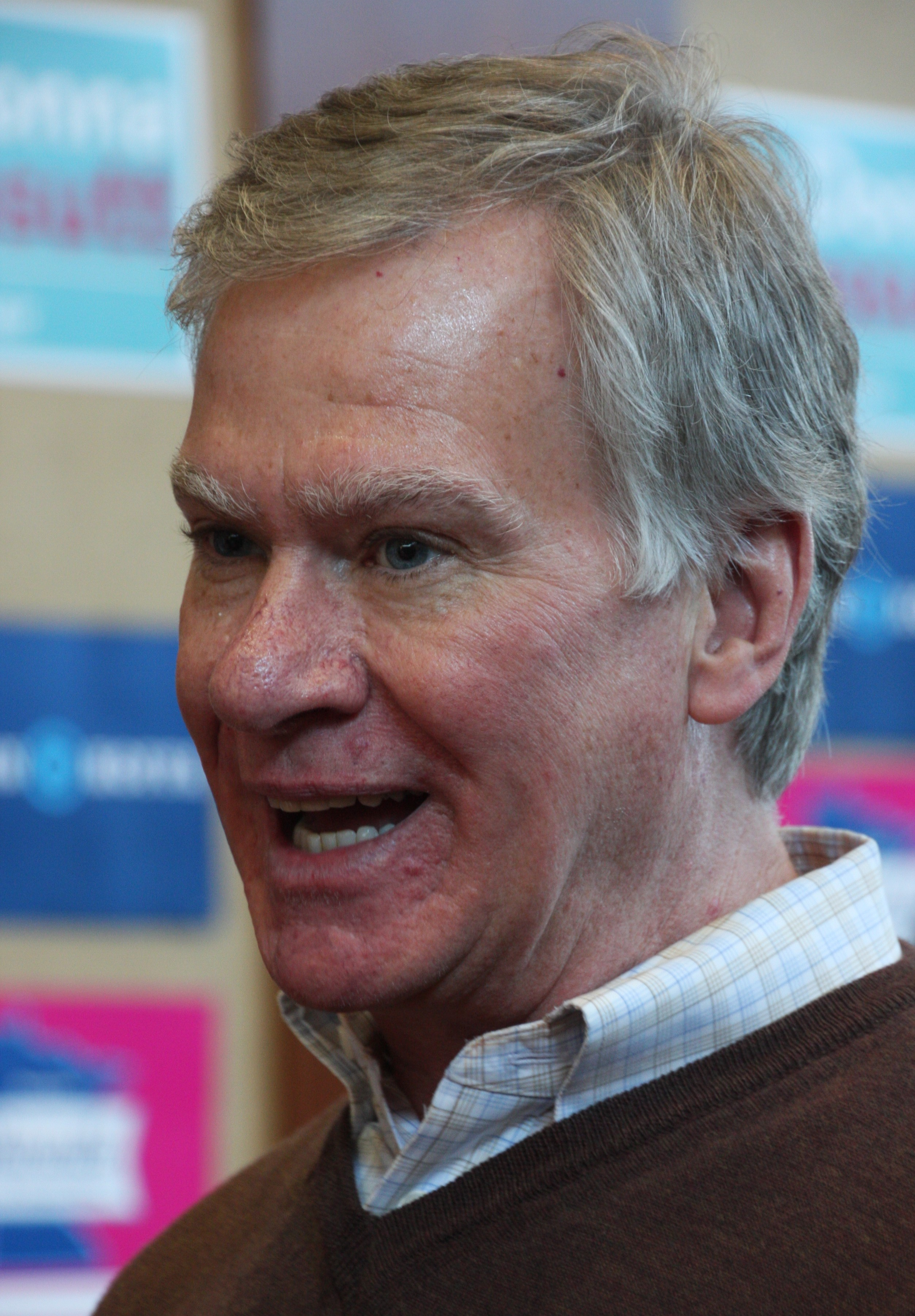
- Coleman in 2017

53rd Mayor of Saint Paul
- In office January 3, 2006 – January 2, 2018
- Preceded by: Randy Kelly
- Succeeded by: Melvin Carter

87th President of the National League of Cities
- In office 2014
- Preceded by: Marie Lopez Rodger
- Succeeded by: Ralph Becker

Member of the Saint Paul City Council for Ward 2
- In office 1997 – January 2003

Personal details
- Born: September 1, 1961 (age 64) Saint Paul, Minnesota, U.S.
- Party: Democratic (DFL)
- Spouse: Connie Coleman
- Education: University of Minnesota (BA, JD)

Christopher B. Coleman (born September 1, 1961) is an American politician and lawyer who served as the 54th Mayor of Saint Paul, Minnesota between 2006 and 2018. He defeated incumbent mayor Randy Kelly in 2005 and took office on January 3, 2006. He was later succeeded by city councilman Melvin Carter on January 2, 2018.

== Family and early career ==
Chris Coleman was born in Saint Paul, Minnesota into a Roman Catholic family. The son of Bridget (Finnegan) and Nicholas Coleman, Sr., who served as State Senate majority leader from 1973 to 1981, Chris Coleman attended Cretin High School in St. Paul. His brother, Nick Coleman, was a columnist and reporter for the Minneapolis Star Tribune and the St. Paul Pioneer Press, and their stepmother, Deborah Howell, was an editor for the Minneapolis Star and the St. Paul Pioneer Press and an ombudsman for The Washington Post. He is of no relation to former mayor and U.S. Senator Norm Coleman.

Coleman attended the University of Minnesota as both an undergraduate and law student. He then worked for eight years in Hennepin County as a public defender and prosecutor. Proposals to build a metal shredder along the Mississippi River in Saint Paul inspired his first run for the Saint Paul City Council. Coleman represented Saint Paul's Ward 2 from 1997 to 2003. While on the city council he was also an investment management consultant specializing in nonprofit organizations and endowments for RBC Dain Rauscher. He was also president of United Family Practice Medical Center.

Coleman unsuccessfully sought the Democratic-Farmer-Labor (DFL) nomination for the United States House of Representatives seat in Minnesota's 4th congressional district in 2000. Betty McCollum won both the nomination and the seat.

== Mayorship ==
Coleman ran in the 2005 Saint Paul mayoral election, challenging the DFL incumbent, Randy Kelly. Kelly had alienated supporters with his endorsement of George W. Bush in the 2004 presidential election, and national Democratic figures endorsed Coleman. Wesley Clark, John Kerry, and Bill Richardson visited St. Paul to campaign for Coleman, while Hillary Clinton and John Edwards actively supported him. Coleman defeated Kelly in the general election, 69% to 31%.

Shortly after taking office, Coleman signed a city ordinance banning tobacco smoking in all bars and restaurants within city limits. The ban had long been opposed by former mayor Kelly.

Coleman is a member of the Mayors Against Illegal Guns Coalition, an organization formed in 2006 and co-chaired by New York City mayor Michael Bloomberg and Boston mayor Thomas Menino.

Coleman worked with then Minneapolis mayor R. T. Rybak in bids to host a national party convention. St. Paul was selected as the site of the 2008 Republican National Convention.

In 2009, Coleman was elected to a second term. He again received 69% of the general election vote, while his Republican opponent, Eva Ng, received 31%. Coleman successfully sought a third term in 2013, defeating three challengers with 78% of the vote.

Coleman also served as President of the National League of Cities until his term expired at the end of 2014. He was well-known for being a champion of education, with the launch of the Sprocket’s After School Network being a key milestone during his administration.

Coleman declined to run for a fourth term as mayor.

== 2010 Governor's Race ==
In 2009, Coleman contemplated a bid for the DFL nomination for Governor of Minnesota in the 2010 election but withdrew from the race before formally announcing a bid.

== 2018 Governor's Race ==
On December 13, 2016, Coleman announced his second candidacy for Governor of Minnesota in the 2018 election, which he later withdrew.

In June 2018, he became the president and CEO of the Twin Cities chapter of Habitat for Humanity.

Political offices
Preceded by Randy Kelly	Mayor of Saint Paul; 2006–2018	Succeeded by Melvin Carter
