= Robert Torricelli =

American politician (born 1951)

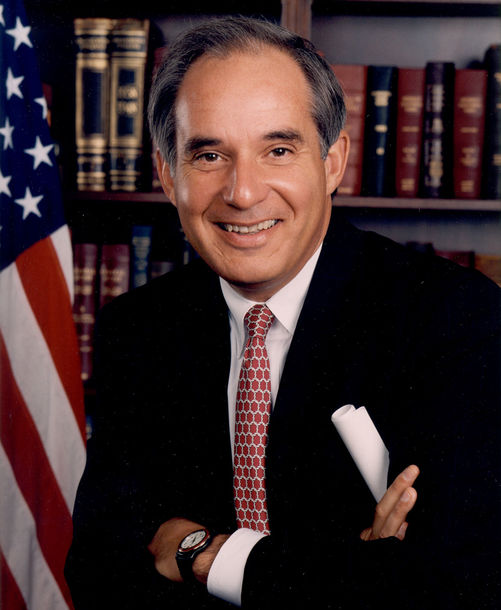
- Official portrait, 1997

Chair of the Democratic Senatorial Campaign Committee
- In office January 3, 1999 – January 3, 2001
- Leader: Tom Daschle
- Preceded by: Bob Kerrey
- Succeeded by: Patty Murray

United States Senator from New Jersey
- In office January 3, 1997 – January 3, 2003
- Preceded by: Bill Bradley
- Succeeded by: Frank Lautenberg

Member of the U.S. House of Representatives from New Jersey's 9th district
- In office January 3, 1983 – January 3, 1997
- Preceded by: Harold Hollenbeck
- Succeeded by: Steve Rothman

Personal details
- Born: Robert Guy Torricelli; August 27, 1951 (age 75) Paterson, New Jersey, U.S.
- Party: Democratic
- Spouse: Susan Holloway (m. 1980; div. 2001)
- Education: Rutgers University, New Brunswick (BA); Rutgers University, Newark (JD); Harvard University (MPA)
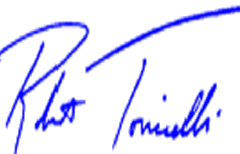
- Signature

Robert Guy Torricelli (born August 27, 1951) is an American attorney, real estate developer, consultant, and former Democratic Party politician who represented New Jersey in the United States House of Representatives from 1983 to 1997 and the United States Senate from 1997 to 2003. In the House, he represented the state's 9th congressional district, which centered on Bergen County. He also chaired the Democratic Senatorial Campaign Committee during the 2000 elections.

In September 2002, Torricelli's political career came to an abrupt end when he was formally admonished by the Senate for his connection to a campaign finance scandal and he ended his campaign for re-election to a second term.

== Early life and education ==
Robert Guy Torricelli was born on August 27, 1951 in Paterson, New Jersey to Betty (née Lotz) and Salvatore Torricelli. His mother was a school librarian, and his father was a lawyer. He was raised in suburban Franklin Lakes. Torricelli later described himself as "a very serious child" and credited his mother, an avid supporter of the New Deal platform who would bring home recordings of speeches by Franklin D. Roosevelt and Winston Churchill, for inspiring his political ambition. His father was the son of Sicilian immigrants and was also active in the Democratic Party, running unsuccessfully for local office several times.

Torricelli attended Storm King School as a boarder in Cornwall-on-Hudson, New York. He began running for office in the fifth grade, and he was repeatedly elected class president through college. While at Storm King, he earned the nickname "the Torch," which would follow him into politics, for his aggressive style of campaigning. After graduation, Torricelli attended Rutgers University–New Brunswick, where continued to serve as class president. In his freshman year, he campaigned using a brass band while other candidates relied on more traditional tactics. He received his Bachelor of Arts degree in 1974.

He earned his Juris Doctor degree in 1977 from Rutgers Law School in Newark. He was admitted to the New Jersey bar in 1978, and he later attended the Harvard Kennedy School, earning a master of public administration degree in 1980.

== Early political career ==
After graduating from Rutgers Law, Torricelli worked briefly as an assistant to New Jersey governor Brendan Byrne. In 1978, he served as associate counsel to Vice President Walter Mondale. He accompanied Mondale on international trips and meetings with world leaders, deepening his interest in foreign affairs.

In 1980, Torricelli was deeply involved with the re-election campaign for Mondale and President Jimmy Carter. He moved to Illinois to manage the campaign there. At the 1980 Democratic National Convention, he served as the director of the committee on rules, which decisively ruled against a motion by supporters of Ted Kennedy to allow Carter delegates to defect. After the Democratic ticket was defeated by Ronald Reagan in the general election, Torricelli returned to New Jersey to practice law.

== U.S. representative (1983–97) ==
From 1983 until 1997, Torricelli represented New Jersey's 9th congressional district in the United States House of Representatives. During his time in office, the district was heavily suburban and centered on southern Bergen County and included parts of Hudson and Passaic counties. He was a resident of New Milford, New Jersey during his first term in Congress.

=== Elections ===
In 1982, Torricelli challenged Republican incumbent Harold C. Hollenbeck for in the election for New Jersey's 9th congressional district. During the campaign, Torricelli knocked on over 75 thousand doors. Torricelli was helped by an entirely redrawn congressional map in New Jersey, which made the solidly Republican district much more Democratic and introduced many new voters Hollenbeck had not previously represented. He won the seat by approximately 13,000 votes.

In 1984, Torricelli's district was again redrawn after the prior election's map was ruled unconstitutional in Karcher v. Daggett. He continued to easily win re-election through 1994, serving a total of seven terms in the House until he chose to run for election to the Senate in 1996.

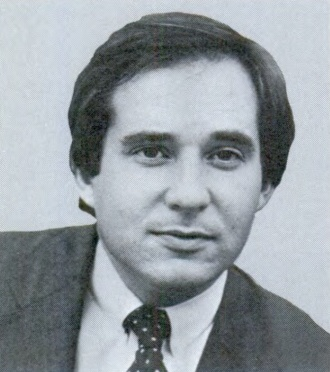
Official portrait, 100th Congress

=== Tenure ===
Upon entering Congress, he quickly became heavily involved in foreign affairs, joining the House Committee on Foreign Affairs. He served as chair of the subcommittee on the Western hemisphere. He also joined the Select Committee on Intelligence.

As a congressman, Torricelli continued to maintain a reputation for raw ambition. In 1990, he lobbied for an appointment as chair of the Democratic Congressional Campaign Committee, but he was passed over. In 1995, he unsuccessfully sought an election as chair of the Democratic National Committee, but President Bill Clinton rejected his candidacy.

==== Domestic issues ====
He opposed Reagan's Strategic Defense Initiative. In 1989, Torricelli led legislative efforts to require double hulls on oil tankers following the Exxon Valdez oil spill. After several children died in 1991 of e. coli poisoning believed to have originated in tainted fast food, Torricelli drafted legislation to reform food inspection procedures.

By the end of his term in the House, Torricelli's views on economic issues was considered moderate. He supported a constitutional balanced budget amendment and several Republican proposals to cut taxes, though he opposed Republican-led efforts to eliminate direct federal education loans and to cut the Environmental Protection Agency budget.

==== Foreign affairs ====
While he was well regarded for his work on domestic issues and constituent services, Torricelli's work on foreign affairs gained him wide recognition. In 1996, Torricelli said, "This nation operates on such a shallow knowledge of history and perception of itself as a shaper of events. We're underestimating our ability as architects of history."

In 1991, Torricelli was floor leader among Democratic supporters of the joint resolution authorizing Operation Desert Storm and gave the closing speech. His support for the war was vehemently criticized by his own mother, who died in 1991.

Torricelli was the lead House sponsor of the Cuban Democracy Act of 1992, sometimes referred to as the Torricelli Act or Torricelli–Graham Act, which prohibits United States trade with Cuba. In 1988, Torricelli visited Cuba himself and stated, "Living standards are not high, but the homelessness, hunger and disease that is witnessed in much of Latin America does not appear evident." Torricelli himself admitted that the embargo would "wreak havoc on that island," but he defended it as necessary to force democratic reform on the island and halt Castro's export of violent revolution in Latin America. After his opponent Bill Clinton endorsed the legislation, President George H. W. Bush signed the act into law on October 23, 1992. During his 1996 campaign for Senate, critics accused Torricelli of changing his position in response to 1992 redistricting, which placed more Cuban American voters into his district, and large campaign donations from Jorge Mas Canosa. Helen Yaffe noted that between Torricelli's visit to the island and passage of the 1992 law, he received significant campaign contributions from the Cuban American National Foundation.

In 1995, Torricelli accused the Central Intelligence Agency (CIA) of covering up information about an informant's involvement in two murders in Guatemala. In response, several conservative members of the Select Committee on Intelligence called for Torricelli to be removed from the panel. In response, Torricelli called House speaker Newt Gingrich "a participant in a conspiracy of silence" who had "a stronger allegiance to the CIA than to the truth." His stand won praise from former U.S. ambassador Robert E. White.

== U.S. senator (1997–2003) ==
Torricelli was elected to the U.S. Senate in 1996, defeating Republican congressman Dick Zimmer by 291,511 votes to obtain the seat vacated by the retirement of Democratic Senator Bill Bradley. It was later found that six donors had made illegal contributions to Torricelli's campaign. In 2000, he headed the Democratic Senatorial Campaign Committee which regained the Democratic majority in the Senate. Torricelli was responsible for recruiting Senate candidates including Hillary Clinton. As a member of the Senate Finance Committee, Torricelli amended the tax code to permit the partial deduction of college tuition for the first time. After 9/11, he amended legislation to authorize a new rail tunnel to New York City.

A federal criminal investigation into Torricelli was dropped in early 2002. In the summer of 2002, however, Torricelli received a formal letter of admonishment from the U.S. Senate Select Committee on Ethics following an investigation into his alleged receipt of improper gifts from campaign donor David Chang, who had pleaded guilty to violating federal election laws. Torricelli apologized to voters for his behavior and delivered a speech in which he promised to take "'full personal responsibility'" for his actions. On September 30, 2002, Torricelli ended his 2002 re-election campaign after Republicans "successfully made the incumbent's ethics troubles -- stemming from illegal 1996 campaign donations and questionable gifts -- a campaign issue..." Shortly thereafter, the New Jersey Supreme Court unanimously ruled that the Democratic Party could legally replace Torricelli's name on the ballot with that of former U.S. Senator Frank Lautenberg.

During his time in the Senate, Torricelli was a member of the Governmental Affairs Committee, the Finance Committee, and the Rules Committee.

== Later career ==
In 2003, Torricelli was appointed by the U.S. District Court for the District of New Jersey as special master overseeing the environmental cleanup project of the Mutual Chemical site in Jersey City, New Jersey, owned by the Honeywell Corporation.

Torricelli founded business and government affairs consulting firm Rosemont Associates. He is the founding partner in real estate firm Woodrose Properties, which is invested in over 50 multi family or commercial properties in 10 states. Torricelli has represented the Iranian opposition group, the MEK..

In 2007, Torricelli drew public criticism despite federal rules allowing retired officials to give leftover campaign funds to political parties, candidates and charities when his leftover campaign funds, given to the Rosemont Foundation, were not funneled back to his political party. The Rosemont Foundation donates funds to animal welfare charities with particular emphasis on dog shelters.

Torricelli serves as a Board Member for Clover Health, Glassbridge Financial and National Retail Systems.

== Personal life ==
In 1980, Torricelli married to Susan Holloway, a fellow Mondale aide. They had no children and divorced in 1989, but they remained friends, and Holloway was a fundraiser for his 1996 Senate campaign.

In 1986, Torricelli assumed care for a 15-year-old girl whose father was a fugitive and had fled the country. The guardianship became an issue in the 1996 Senate election, when his opponent accused him of protecting a fugitive, and he repeatedly denied any knowledge of the father's whereabouts.

In 1993, Torricelli met Bianca Jagger when she requested his help obtaining a visa for a Bosnian boy in need of cardiac surgery. After arranging the visa, he allowed Jagger and the boy to stay in his Englewood home in preparation for the surgery. Torricelli and Jagger worked together on other human rights initiatives and dated for around three years. In 1996, Jagger described him as "very stubborn" and "combative," but ultimately said, "I think he is a man of courage."

== Bibliography ==
- Robert Torricelli Andrew Carroll (1999). In Our Own Words: Extraordinary Speeches of the American Century. WSP.
- Robert Torricelli (2000). Quotations for Public Speakers: A Historical, Literary, and Political Anthology. Rutgers University Press. ISBN 9780813528892.

== See also ==
- List of federal political scandals in the United States

U.S. House of Representatives
Preceded by Harold Hollenbeck	Member of the U.S. House of Representatives from New Jersey's 9th congressional district 1983–1997	Succeeded by Steve Rothman
Party political offices
Preceded by Bill Bradley	Democratic nominee for U.S. Senator from New Jersey (Class 2); 1996, 2002 (withdrew)	Succeeded by Frank Lautenberg
Preceded by Bob Kerrey	Chair of the Democratic Senatorial Campaign Committee; 1999–2001	Succeeded by Patty Murray
U.S. Senate
Preceded by Bill Bradley	U.S. Senator (Class 2) from New Jersey; 1997–2003; Served alongside: Frank Lautenberg, Jon Corzine	Succeeded by Frank Lautenberg
U.S. order of precedence (ceremonial)
Preceded by Ben Sasse as Former U.S. Senator	Order of precedence of the United States	Succeeded by Mack Mattingly as Former U.S. Senator
