= Randy Kelly =

American politician (born 1950)

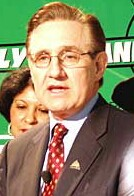
- Kelly in 2013

52nd Mayor of St. Paul
- In office 2002–2006
- Preceded by: Norm Coleman
- Succeeded by: Chris Coleman

Member of the Minnesota Senate for the 67th District
- In office January 8, 1991 – January 2, 2002
- Preceded by: Marilyn Lantry
- Succeeded by: Mee Moua

Personal details
- Born: Randy Cameron Kelly; August 2, 1950 (age 76) Rolette, North Dakota, U.S.
- Party: Democratic (DFL)
- Spouse: Kathy Parrish
- Children: 2
- Profession: politician, legislator, computer technician

Randy Cameron Kelly (born August 2, 1950) is an American politician and the former mayor of Saint Paul, Minnesota. He is a member of the Democratic–Farmer–Labor Party (DFL).

Born in the small town of Rolette, North Dakota, Kelly and his family later moved to Saint Paul, where he graduated from Harding High School, and the University of Minnesota.

== Service in the Minnesota Legislature ==
Kelly served in the Minnesota Senate from 1991 to 2002, representing District 67 (covering most of Saint Paul's East Side), and in the Minnesota House of Representatives from 1983 to 1991, representing districts 66B and, after redistricting, 67A. While in the legislature, he worked to reform Minnesota's criminal justice system, including creating a statewide criminal gang strike force, developing a four-year law enforcement degree, authoring many of the existing crime-victim and witness laws, and worked towards requiring sexual offender registration and community notification.

Kelly served as chair (2001) and a member of the Senate Transportation Committee, and was also a member of the Crime Prevention, Finance, and Telecommunications & Energy & Utilities committees. He was also a member of the Public Safety Budget Division subcommittee. Previously, in the Minnesota House, he had served as chair of the House Judiciary Committee from 1987 to 1991.

== Mayor of Saint Paul ==
Kelly was the mayor of Saint Paul, Minnesota from January 2002 through January 2006. He won the office in 2001 by just 403 votes in a tight race with Jay Benanav, a city councilman. As mayor, he was noted for his efforts to increase the minimum wage and create and retain high-paying jobs.

During Kelly's term in office, his political views and several appointments generated controversy. In 2004, he rankled fellow Democrats by endorsing and campaigning for President George W. Bush's re-election. According to critics, his conservative views, which may have been intended to garner support from Republicans and independents, undermined his constituent base in the Democratic Party. An unsuccessful grassroots campaign to recall him was launched shortly after his announcement in support of Bush's re-election effort.

In 2005, one of Kelly's appointees, Sia Lo, head of the criminal division of the city attorney's office, was reported to be at the center of an investigation into alleged corruption in a city development deal which focused on a new Hmong funeral home on the city's West Side. Lo was never charged.

== 2005 mayoral race ==
Kelly sought reelection in 2005 and narrowly avoided being dropped from the ballot in the September primary. Fellow DFLer Chris Coleman finished in first place with 52% of the vote, Kelly at 27%, and the Green Party candidate, Elizabeth Dickinson, at 20%. The top two finishers went on to the November general election, in which Coleman defeated Kelly 69% to 31%. This was only the third loss by an incumbent Saint Paul mayor, as well as the greatest percentage loss on record for an incumbent mayor in the city's history.

In the aftermath of the election, it was suggested that Kelly's endorsement of President Bush the previous fall was a factor in his loss to Coleman.

== Post-mayoral activities ==
In late 2006, Kelly was named Deputy Associate Administrator for Intergovernmental Relations for the Environmental Protection Agency by President Bush. At the EPA, his duties included managing relations with governors, state legislators, mayors, county executives and other state and local officials, as well as working with the national associations representing these officials. In the position, he also served as the liaison to the White House Office of Intergovernmental Affairs. He remained in this position until early 2009.

He continues to reside on Saint Paul's East Side with his wife and family. Kelly's youngest son, Reed Kelly, competed on season 29 of Survivor on CBS with his boyfriend Josh Canfield.

== Notes ==
Political offices
| Preceded by Norm Coleman | Mayor of St. Paul; 2002–2006 | Succeeded by Chris Coleman |
Minnesota Senate
| Preceded by Marilyn Lantry | Member of the Minnesota Senate from the 67th District; 1991–2002 | Succeeded by Mee Moua |
