= Deborah Howell =

American journalist (1941–2010)

- Born: Deborah Howell; San Antonio, Texas, U.S.
- Died: January 2, 2010 (aged 68); New Zealand
- Occupation: Journalist

Deborah Howell (January 15, 1941 – January 2, 2010) was a long-time newswoman and editor who served for three years as the ombudsman for The Washington Post.

Howell is a Board Member In Memoriam at the IWMF (International Women's Media Foundation).

== Biography ==
Howell was born in San Antonio, Texas, where her father worked as a journalist at the San Antonio Express-News and was a well-known broadcaster and meteorologist at WOAI Radio and TV. Howell entered journalism by working on her high school paper and then, as a journalism student, on The Daily Texan, the student newspaper for The University of Texas at Austin. After graduation, Howell had difficulty finding a job other than on old-time women's pages and instead took a job at a local TV and radio station. Later, she was hired to work on the copy desk of the Corpus Christi Caller-Times, before moving to the Minneapolis Star as a reporter, then city editor and assistant managing editor. She was hired at the St. Paul Pioneer Press as senior vice president and editor before becoming the Washington bureau chief and editor of Newhouse News Service from 1990 until 2005.

Howell served on the board of directors of the American Society of Newspaper Editors from 1992 to 1999 and on the ASNE Foundation Board from 2000 until her death. She was a member of the board of the International Women's Media Foundation and the National Press Foundation.

On January 2, 2010, Howell died after being struck by a motorist while she was vacationing in New Zealand. She had stopped to take a photo near Blenheim, and may have looked the wrong way for other vehicles.

== Washington Post career ==
On February 25, 2005, Howell was named ombudsman of the Washington Post. On October 23, 2005, Howell introduced herself to readers by saying she had two goals in mind: "to foster good journalism and to increase understanding between the Post and its readers."

Her farewell column appeared on December 28, 2008.

Andrew Alexander took over as the Post ombudsman on February 2, 2009.

=== Abramoff column controversy ===
In January 2006, Howell became involved in a dispute with some of her readers over the contents of one of her columns. In her January 15 column defending the reporting by Washington Post reporter Susan Schmidt on lobbyist Jack Abramoff, Howell claimed that Abramoff "had made substantial campaign contributions to both major parties," referring to the Republicans and Democrats. Many readers took exception to Howell's statement, pointing to Federal Election Commission records that showed Abramoff had given money only to Republicans and none to Democrats.

After receiving many angry comments at the Post's blog, Howell responded: "A better way to have said it would be that Abramoff 'directed' contributions to both parties."

This did not satisfy some readers of the blog, who responded that although Abramoff's clients did give money to both parties, there was no evidence that Abramoff "directed" contributions to Democrats and furthermore, that Abramoff's clients had given less money to Democrats than non-Abramoff clients.

As the demands on the blog for a retraction and correction continued, the management of the Post decided to shut down and pull all comments from the blog. Jim Brady, executive editor of washingtonpost.com, said there had been "personal attacks, the use of profanity and hate speech" by "a significant number of folks". Some readers were skeptical of his claims and brought forth a mirror site of the blog that showed that there were relatively few posts fitting Brady's description. Brady responded by saying that the comments never showed up on the blog because management had been removing them as soon as they were posted. The Post has since restored 948 comments.

On January 22, 2006, Howell discussed the controversy started by her column the previous week. She repeated the statement that Abramoff had directed his clients to donate to both parties, but this time referred to her original assertion as a mistake and agreed that the Abramoff scandal is "not a bipartisan scandal; it's a Republican scandal." Howell went on to describe some of the "abusive" comments and e-mails she received, saying "I'll read every e-mail and answer as many legitimate complaints as I can ... But I will reject abuse and all that it stands for," adding, "... I have a tough hide, and a few curse words (which I use frequently) are not going to hurt my feelings." The kicker for the column summed up her attitude about the whole matter: "To all of those who wanted me fired, I'm afraid you're out of luck. I have a contract. For the next two years, I will continue to speak my mind. Keep smiling. I will."
