= 1998 United States House of Representatives elections in New Jersey =

- November 3, 1998

All 13 New Jersey seats to the United States House of Representatives
- Turnout: 42% (▼30pp)
	Majority party	Minority party
Party	Democratic	Republican
Last election	6	7
Seats won	7	6
Seat change	▲1	▼1
Popular vote	902,374	858,367
Percentage	49.7%	47.3%
Swing	▲1.82pp	▼2.27pp

Democratic
50–60%
60–70%
70–80%
80–90%
Republican
50–60%
60–70%
70–80%

The 1998 United States House of Representatives elections in New Jersey were held on November 3, 1998, to determine who would represent the people of New Jersey in the United States House of Representatives. This election coincided with national elections for U.S. House and U.S. Senate. New Jersey had thirteen seats in the House, apportioned according to the 1990 United States census. Representatives are elected for two-year terms.

Democrats won the popular vote for the first time since 1986.

== Overview ==
1998 United States House of Representatives elections in New Jersey
Party	Votes	Percentage	Candidates	Seats	+/–
Democratic	902,374	49.70%	13	7	▲1
Republican	858,367	47.28%	13	6	▼1
Independents	54,748	3.02%	41	0	Steady
Totals	1,815,489	100.00%	67	13	—

== District 1 ==
Incumbent Democrat Rob Andrews won. The district included parts of Burlington, Camden, and Gloucester counties.

=== Democratic primary ===
==== Candidates ====
- Rob Andrews, incumbent Representative from Haddon Heights since 1990

==== Results ====
1998 Democratic primary
Party	Candidate	Votes	%
Democratic	Rob Andrews (incumbent)	15,083	100.00%
Total votes		15,083	100.00%

=== Republican primary ===
==== Candidates ====
- Ronald L. Richards, member of the Voorhees Township Committee

==== Results ====
1998 Republican primary
Party	Candidate	Votes	%
Republican	Ronald L. Richards	4,423	100.00%
Total votes		4,423	

=== General election ===
==== Candidates ====
- Rob Andrews, incumbent Representative from Haddon Heights since 1990 (Democratic)
- James E. Barber (Independent)
- Ronald L. Richards, member of the Voorhees Township Committee (Republican)
- Ed Forchion, marijuana legalization activist (Independent)
- Joseph W. Stockman (Independent)
- David E. West Jr. (Independent)

==== Campaign ====
Given this district's strong Democratic lean, the general election was a foregone conclusion in favor of the incumbent Andrews, who easily outraised his opponent. Richards touted his success in cutting local taxes and criticized Andrews, who had spent much of 1997 running for governor, for missing votes in Congress.

==== Results ====
1998 U.S. House election
Party	Candidate	Votes	%	±%
Democratic	Rob Andrews (incumbent)	90,279	73.19%	▼2.93
Republican	Ronald L. Richards	27,855	22.58%	▲1.56
Independent	David E. West Jr.	1,684	1.37%	N/A
Independent	Joseph W. Stockman	1,324	1.07%	N/A
Independent	Ed Forchion	1,257	1.02%	N/A
Independent	James E. Barber	943	0.76%	N/A
Total votes		123,342	100.00%	
Democratic hold		Swing	{{{swing}}}	

== District 2 ==
Incumbent Republican Frank A. LoBiondo won. This district, the largest in South Jersey, included all of Atlantic, Cape May, Cumberland, and Salem counties and parts of Burlington and Gloucester.

=== Republican primary ===
==== Candidates ====
- Frank LoBiondo, incumbent Representative since 1995

==== Results ====
1998 Republican primary
Party	Candidate	Votes	%
Republican	Frank LoBiondo (incumbent)	16,384	100.00%
Total votes		16,384	100.00%

=== Democratic primary ===
==== Candidates ====
- Derek Hunsberger, Rowan University administrator

==== Results ====
1998 Democratic primary
Party	Candidate	Votes	%
Democratic	Derek Hunsberger	5,102	100.00%
Total votes		5,102	100.00%

=== General election ===
==== Candidates ====
- Glenn Campbell (Independent)
- Derek Hunsberger, Rowan University administrator (Democratic)
- Frank LoBiondo, incumbent Representative since 1995 (Republican)
- Mary A. Whittam (Independent)

==== Candidate ====
Hunsberger, who was only 28, ran without the support of Democratic leadership and described himself as an "angry voter candidate" opposed to the two-party system. He refused to raise money and instead focused on direct voter outreach.

==== Results ====
1998 U.S. House election
Party	Candidate	Votes	%	±%
Republican	Frank LoBiondo (incumbent)	93,248	65.89%	▲5.58
Democratic	Derek Hunsberger	43,563	30.78%	▼7.23
Independent	Glenn Campbell	2,955	2.09%	N/A
Independent	Mary A. Whittam	1,748	1.24%	N/A
Total votes		141,514	100.00%	
Republican hold		Swing	{{{swing}}}	

== District 3 ==
Incumbent Republican Jim Saxton won. This district included parts of Burlington, Camden, and Ocean counties.

=== Republican primary ===
==== Candidates ====
- Jim Saxton, incumbent Representative from Mount Holly since 1984

==== Results ====
1998 Republican primary
Party	Candidate	Votes	%
Republican	Jim Saxton (incumbent)	12,254	100.00%
Total votes		12,254	100.00%

=== General election ===
==== Candidates ====
- Ken Feduniewicz, candidate for this district in 1996 (Independent)
- Steven J. Polansky, attorney and former member of the Cherry Hill Board of Education (Democratic)
- James Pircher (Independent)
- Janice Presser, candidate for this district in 1996 (Independent)
- Jim Saxton, incumbent Representative from Mount Holly since 1984 (Republican)
- Norman E. Wahner, candidate for the 1st district in 1996 (Independent)

==== Results ====
1998 U.S. House election
Party	Candidate	Votes	%	
Republican	Jim Saxton (incumbent)	97,508	62.01%	▼2.20
Democratic	Steven J. Polansky	55,248	35.14%	▲1.88
Independent	Janice Presser	2,527	1.61%	▲0.37
Independent	Norman E. Wahner	1,063	0.68%	N/A
Independent	James Pircher	608	0.39%	N/A
Independent	Ken Feduniewicz	285	0.18%	▼0.09
Total votes		157,239	100.00%	
Republican hold		Swing	{{{swing}}}	

== District 4 ==
Incumbent Republican Chris Smith won. This district, in Central Jersey, consisted of parts of Burlington, Mercer, Monmouth and Ocean counties.

=== Republican primary ===
==== Candidates ====
- Chris Smith, incumbent Representative since 1981

==== Results ====
1998 Republican primary
Party	Candidate	Votes	%
Republican	Chris Smith (incumbent)	20,062	100.00%
Total votes		20,062	100.00%

=== Democratic primary ===
==== Candidates ====
- Paul Rizzo
- Lewis duPont Smith
- Larry Schneider, software development executive
- Paul D. Teel

==== Results ====
1998 Democratic primary
Party	Candidate	Votes	%
Democratic	Larry Schneider	6,238	78.33%
Democratic	Paul Rizzo	1,099	13.80%
Democratic	Lewis duPont Smith	316	3.97%
Democratic	Paul D. Teel	311	3.91%
Total votes		7,964	100.00%

=== General election ===
==== Candidates ====
- Nick Mellis (Independent)
- Keith Quarles, candidate for the sixth district in 1996 (Independent)
- Larry Schneider, software development executive (Democratic)
- Chris Smith, incumbent Representative since 1981 (Republican)
- Morgan Strong, candidate for this district in 1996 (Independent)

==== Campaign ====
Schneider criticized Smith for using abortion to derail United States funding for the United Nations; Smith's position on abortion had been a consistent target for his Democratic opponents.

==== Results ====
1998 U.S. House election
Party	Candidate	Votes	%	±%
Republican	Chris Smith (incumbent)	92,991	62.17%	▼1.45
Democratic	Larry Schneider	52,281	34.95%	▲1.24
Independent	Keith Quarles	1,753	1.17%	N/A
Independent	Morgan Strong	1,498	1.00%	▲0.12
Independent	Nick Mellis	1,054	0.70%	N/A
Total votes		149,577	100.00%	
Republican hold		Swing	{{{swing}}}	

== District 5 ==
Incumbent Marge Roukema won after facing a strong primary challenge from assemblyman Scott Garrett. This district included parts of Bergen, Passaic, and Sussex counties and all of Warren County.

=== Republican primary ===
==== Candidates ====
- Scott Garrett, assemblyman from Wantage
- Marge Roukema, incumbent Representative from Ridgewood since 1981

==== Results ====
1998 Republican primary
Party	Candidate	Votes	%
Republican	Marge Roukema (incumbent)	16,215	52.80%
Republican	Scott Garrett	14,498	47.20%
Total votes		30,713	100.00%

=== Democratic primary ===
==== Candidates ====
- Mike Schneider, former television anchorman

==== Results ====
1998 Democratic primary
Party	Candidate	Votes	%
Democratic	Mike Schneider	5,605	100.00%
Total votes		5,605	100.00%

=== General election ===
==== Candidates ====
- Helen Hamilton, candidate for this district in 1994 and 1996 (Independent)
- Marge Roukema, incumbent Representative from Ridgewood since 1981 (Republican)
- Mike Schneider, former television anchorman (Democratic)
- William Weightman (Independent)
- Thomas W. Wright (Independent)

==== Campaign ====
Schneider, who had never run for public office, ran his campaign on a limited budget, did not have consultants or media advisors, and refused to accept money from political action committees.

==== Results ====
1998 U.S. House election
Party	Candidate	Votes	%	±%
Republican	Marge Roukema (incumbent)	106,304	63.72%	▼7.57
Democratic	Mike Schneider	55,487	33.26%	▲8.51
Independent	Thomas W. Wright	2,395	1.44%	N/A
Independent	William Weightman	1,628	0.96%	N/A
Independent	Helen Hamilton	1,004	0.60%	▼0.06
Total votes		166,818	100.00%	
Republican hold		Swing	{{{swing}}}	

== District 6 ==
Incumbent Democrat Frank Pallone won. This district included parts of Middlesex and Monmouth counties.

=== Democratic primary ===
==== Candidates ====
- Frank Pallone, incumbent Representative from Long Branch since 1988

==== Results ====
1998 Democratic primary
Party	Candidate	Votes	%
Democratic	Frank Pallone (incumbent)	24,475	100.00%
Total votes		24,475	

=== Republican primary ===
==== Candidates ====
- Mike Ferguson, Brookdale College political science professor

==== Results ====
1998 Republican primary
Party	Candidate	Votes	%
Republican	Mike Ferguson	4,905	100.00%
Total votes		4,905	100.00%

=== General election ===
==== Candidates ====
- Mike Ferguson, Brookdale College political science professor (Republican)
- Leonard P. Marshall (Independent)
- Carl J. Mayer, consumer advocate, member of the Princeton Township Council, and runner-up in the 1996 and 1998 Democratic primaries in the twelfth district (Green)
- Steve Nagle (Independent)
- Frank Pallone, incumbent Representative from Long Branch since 1988 (Democratic)

==== Campaign ====
Carl J. Mayer, who finished second in the Democratic primary in the neighboring twelfth district for the second consecutive election, went to court to win the right to run as an independent against Pallone. Although Pallone had supported Rush Holt, his primary opponent, Mayer claimed he had no personal animosity towards Pallone. His campaign was self-financed.

Mike Ferguson, a political science professor, ran a well-financed challenge with funding from the national and state Republican committees and the New Conservative Leadership Fund; he was able to run television commercials and full-page newspaper advertisements attacking Pallone. Although Pallone would typically be heavily favored on the basis of the district's Democratic lean, Karen Demasters of The New York Times reported it to be a toss-up in the final week of campaigning, given two well-funded challengers.

==== Results ====
1998 U.S. House election
Party	Candidate	Votes	%	±%
Democratic	Frank Pallone Jr. (incumbent)	78,102	57.00%	▼4.25
Republican	Mike Ferguson	55,180	40.27%	▲4.20
Green	Carl J. Mayer	1,291	0.94%	N/A
Independent	Steve Nagle	1,262	0.92%	N/A
Independent	Leonard P. Marshall	1,177	0.86%	N/A
Total votes		137,012	100.00%	
Democratic hold		Swing	{{{swing}}}	

== District 7 ==
Incumbent Bob Franks won. This district included parts of Essex, Middlesex, Somerset, and Union counties.

=== Republican primary ===
==== Candidates ====
- Bob Franks, incumbent Representative from Summit since 1993

==== Results ====
1998 Republican primary
Party	Candidate	Votes	%
Republican	Bob Franks (incumbent)	8,955	100.00%
Total votes		8,955	100.00%

=== Democratic primary ===
==== Candidates ====
- Maryanne Connelly, mayor of Fanwood

==== Results ====
1998 Democratic primary
Party	Candidate	Votes	%
Democratic	Maryanne Connelly	7,151	100.00%
Total votes		7,151	100.00%

=== General election ===
==== Candidates ====
- Maryanne Connelly, mayor of Fanwood (Democratic)
- Bob Franks, incumbent Representative from Summit since 1993 (Republican)
- Richard C. Martin (Independent)
- Darren Young (Independent)

==== Campaign ====
Franks, who had been handily elected to three terms in office, campaigned on the Republican record in Congress, including balancing the budget and welfare reform.

Connelly criticized Franks for neglecting his duties to his district, arguing that he was focused on running for governor in 2001 rather than his job in Washington. She proposed low-interest loans for middle-income families to cover the costs of college and opposed school vouchers, which she argued would undermine the public school system. Although the district was Republican-leaning, Connelly expected to gain support from opponents of the ongoing Clinton impeachment proceedings, who believed that Republicans were persecuting the president.

==== Results ====
1998 U.S. House election
Party	Candidate	Votes	%	±%
Republican	Bob Franks (incumbent)	77,751	52.52%	▼2.87
Democratic	Maryanne Connelly	65,778	44.43%	▲2.60
Independent	Richard C. Martin	3,007	2.03%	N/A
Independent	Darren Young	1,508	1.02%	N/A
Total votes		148,042	100.00%	
Republican hold		Swing	{{{swing}}}	

== District 8 ==
Incumbent Democrat Bill Pascrell won. This district included parts of Essex and Passaic counties.

=== Democratic primary ===
==== Candidates ====
- Bill Pascrell, incumbent Representative from Paterson since 1997

==== Results ====
1998 Democratic primary
Party	Candidate	Votes	%
Democratic	Bill Pascrell (incumbent)	10,167	100.00%
Total votes		10,167	100.00%

=== Republican primary ===
==== Candidates ====
- Matthew J. Kirnan, attorney and mayor of Verona

==== Results ====
1998 Republican primary
Party	Candidate	Votes	%
Republican	Matthew J. Kirnan	6,871	100.00%
Total votes		6,871	100.00%

=== General election ===
==== Candidates ====
- Jose L. Aravena (Independent)
- Thomas Paine Caslander (Independent)
- Bernard George, Conservative Party nominee for this district in 1994 (Independent)
- Matthew J. Kirnan, attorney and mayor of Verona (Republican)
- Jeffrey Levine, candidate for this district in 1996 (Independent)
- Bill Pascrell, incumbent Representative from Paterson since 1997 (Democratic)
- Stephen Spinosa (Independent)

==== Campaign ====
After three consecutive competitive elections, the Republican Party initially expected to challenge Bill Pascrell for re-election. Their nominee, Matthew Kirnan, was the mayor of Verona and an ally of James Treffinger, who led the Essex County ticket. He also benefited from running with popular sheriff Edwin Englehardt in Passaic County. Both Governor Christine Todd Whitman and former governor Thomas Kean campaigned in the district for Kirnan, who emphasized education reform in his campaign, including support for competitive standardized testing and merit pay for teachers.

However, the urban cores of the district in Paterson and Passaic had turned out for Bill Clinton in 1996 and Jim McGreevey in 1997, and Pascrell appeared to have late momentum.

==== Results ====
1998 U.S. House election
Party	Candidate	Votes	%	±%
Democratic	Bill Pascrell Jr. (incumbent)	81,068	62.08%	▲10.88
Republican	Matthew J. Kirnan	46,289	35.45%	▼12.51
Independent	Jeffrey Levine	804	0.62%	▼0.22
Independent	Stephen Spinosa	762	0.58%	N/A
Independent	Bernard George	722	0.55%	N/A
Independent	Thomas Paine Caslander	625	0.48%	N/A
Independent	Jose L. Aravena	318	0.24%	N/A
Total votes		130,588	100.00%	
Democratic hold		Swing	{{{swing}}}	

== District 9 ==
Incumbent Democrat Steve Rothman won.

=== Democratic primary ===
==== Candidates ====
- Steve Rothman, incumbent Representative from Fair Lawn since 1997

==== Results ====
1998 Democratic primary
Party	Candidate	Votes	%
Democratic	Steve Rothman (incumbent)	14,364	100.00%
Total votes		14,364	100.00%

=== Republican primary ===
==== Candidates ====
- Steve Lonegan, mayor of Bogota

==== Results ====
1998 Republican primary
Party	Candidate	Votes	%
Republican	Steve Lonegan	7,162	100.00%
Total votes		7,162	100.00%

=== General election ===
==== Candidates ====
- Kenneth Ebel (Independent)
- Michael W. Koontz (Independent)
- Steve Lonegan, mayor of Bogota (Republican)
- Michael Perrone Jr. (Independent)
- Steve Rothman, incumbent Representative from Fair Lawn since 1997 (Democratic)

==== Campaign ====
Steve Lonegan, who had built a political profile by fighting the Federal Aviation Administration over aircraft noise, received full support from the Republican National Committee and national Republican leadership, including 1996 presidential nominee Bob Dole. Republicans considered Rothman vulnerable, particularly in an off-year election without Bill Clinton and Bob Torricelli leading the Democratic ticket.

In contrast to 1996, when Rothman handily defeated Republican nominee Kathleen Donovan, Lonegan was less widely known and more conservative.

==== Results ====
1998 U.S. House election
Party	Candidate	Votes	%	±%
Democratic	Steve Rothman (incumbent)	91,330	64.56%	▲9.47
Republican	Steve Lonegan	47,817	33.80%	▼8.71
Independent	Michael Perrone Jr.	1,349	0.95%	N/A
Independent	Michael W. Koontz	686	0.48%	N/A
Independent	Kenneth Ebel	277	0.20%	N/A
Total votes		141,459	100.00%	
Democratic hold		Swing	{{{swing}}}	

== District 10 ==
Incumbent Democrat Donald M. Payne won. The district included parts of Essex, Hudson, and Union counties.

=== Democratic primary ===
==== Candidates ====
- Donald M. Payne, incumbent Representative from Newark since 1989
- Dennis Speed

==== Results ====
1998 Democratic primary
Party	Candidate	Votes	%
Democratic	Donald M. Payne (incumbent)	24,747	91.65%
Democratic	Dennis Speed	2,254	8.35%
Total votes		27,001	100.00%

=== Republican primary ===
==== Candidates ====
- William Stanley Wnuck, computer scientist

==== Results ====
1998 Republican primary
Party	Candidate	Votes	%
Republican	William Stanley Wnuck	1,431	100.00%
Total votes		1,431	100.00%

=== General election ===
==== Candidates ====
- Donald M. Payne, incumbent Representative from Newark since 1989 (Democratic)
- Richard J. Pezzullo (Independent)
- Maurice Williams (Independent)
- William Stanley Wnuck, computer scientist (Republican)

==== Campaign ====
Wnuck, who came from a family of perennial candidates and was given little chance of defeating Payne, focused his campaign on cutting taxes using the federal budget surplus and opposition to urban revitalization projects in downtown Newark, which he had argued did not help middle-class workers.

==== Results ====
1998 U.S. House election
Party	Candidate	Votes	%	±%
Democratic	Donald M. Payne (incumbent)	82,244	83.50%	▼0.66
Republican	William Stanley Wnuck	10,678	10.84%	▼3.78
Independent	Richard J. Pezzullo	3,293	3.34%	N/A
Independent	Maurice Williams	2,279	2.31%	N/A
Total votes		98,494	100.00%	
Democratic hold		Swing	{{{swing}}}	

== District 11 ==
Incumbent Republican Rodney Frelinghuysen won. This district consisted of all of Morris County and parts of Essex, Passaic, Somerset, and Sussex counties.

=== Republican primary ===
==== Candidates ====
- Rodney Frelinghuysen, incumbent Representative since 1995

==== Results ====
1998 Republican primary
Party	Candidate	Votes	%
Republican	Rodney Frelinghuysen (incumbent)	26,174	100.00%
Total votes		26,174	100.00%

=== Democratic primary ===
==== Candidates ====
- James D. Kelly Jr.
- Frank C. Marmo
- John Mele
- John P. Scollo, attorney for Prudential Insurance

==== Results ====
1998 Democratic primary
Party	Candidate	Votes	%
Democratic	John P. Scollo	4,346	66.65%
Democratic	James D. Kelly Jr.	900	13.80%
Democratic	Frank C. Marmo	853	13.08%
Democratic	John Mele	422	6.47%
Total votes		6,521	100.00%

=== General election ===
==== Candidates ====
- Stephen A. Bauer (Independent)
- Rodney Frelinghuysen, incumbent Representative since 1995 (Republican)
- Agnes A. James (Independent)
- Austin S. Lett, candidate for this district in 1996 (Independent)
- John P. Scollo, attorney for Prudential Insurance (Democratic)

==== Campaign ====
Scollo, who acknowledged he faced an uphill battle to defeat Frelinghuysen, criticized the campaign finance system which required enormous amounts of money to defeat an incumbent. He proposed a tax plan which allowed families to have $35,000 in untaxed income to enable them to "start fighting the battle of the bills by being able to save again."

==== Results ====
1998 U.S. House election
Party	Candidate	Votes	%	±%
Republican	Rodney Frelinghuysen (incumbent)	100,910	67.74%	▲1.47
Democratic	John P. Scollo	44,160	29.95%	▼0.91
Independent	Austin S. Lett	1,737	1.17%	▲0.14
Independent	Agnes A. James	1,409	0.95%	N/A
Independent	Stephen A. Bauer	755	0.05%	N/A
Total votes		148,971	100.00%	
Republican hold		Swing	{{{swing}}}	

== District 12 ==
1998 New Jersey's 12th congressional district election
- November 3, 1998
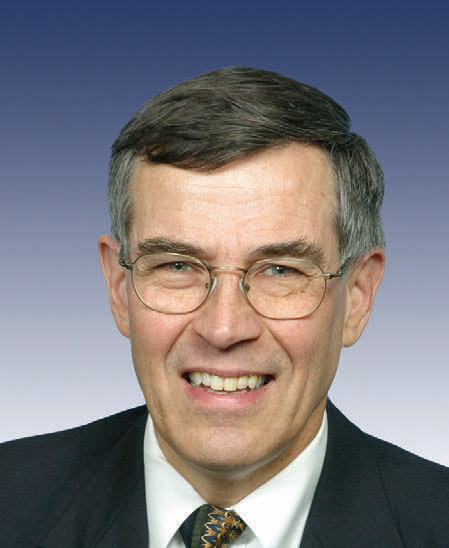

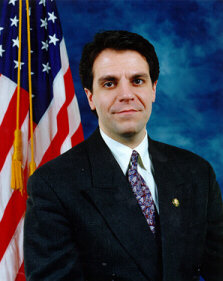
Nominee	Rush Holt Jr.	Mike Pappas
Party	Democratic	Republican
Popular vote	92,528	87,221
Percentage	50.1%	47.2%
U.S. Representative before election
Mike Pappas
Republican
Elected U.S. Representative
Rush Holt Jr.
Democratic

Incumbent Republican Mike Pappas ran for a second term in office but was defeated by Rush Holt Jr. Pappas's campaign sank after he sang "Twinkle, Twinkle, Kenneth Starr" on the floor of the House during the Clinton impeachment proceedings. Holt used the clip of Pappas singing in widely aired advertisements.

This district, based in Central Jersey, included all of Hunterdon County and parts of Mercer, Middlesex, Monmouth and Somerset counties.

=== Republican primary ===
==== Candidates ====
- Mike Pappas, incumbent Representative since 1997

==== Results ====
1998 Republican primary
Party	Candidate	Votes	%
Republican	Mike Pappas	16,277	100.00%
Total votes		16,277	100.00%

=== Democratic primary ===
==== Candidates ====
- Rush Holt Jr., assistant director of the Princeton Plasma Physics Laboratory, candidate for this seat in 1996 and son of U.S. Senator Rush Holt
- Carl J. Mayer, consumer advocate, member of the Princeton Township Committee and candidate for this seat in 1996

==== Results ====
1998 Democratic primary
Party	Candidate	Votes	%
Democratic	Rush Holt	10,177	63.58%
Democratic	Carl J. Mayer	5,830	36.42%
Total votes		16,007	100.00%

=== General election ===
==== Candidates ====
- Mary Jo Christian (Independent)
- Rush Holt Jr., assistant director of the Princeton Plasma Physics Laboratory, candidate for this seat in 1996 and son of U.S. Senator Rush Holt (Democratic)
- Beverly Kidder (Independent)
- Mike Pappas, incumbent Representative since 1997 (Republican)
- Joseph Siano (Independent)

==== Campaign ====
Holt, who emerged from the contentious Democratic primary with low name recognition, was given a slight chance of winning. Although Republican leadership strove to portray this as a safe district, this was the only New Jersey district in which an incumbent Republican was targeted by the Democratic National Committee. Pappas, who was much more conservative than his predecessor Dick Zimmer, also won by a much smaller margin in 1996 than had been typical for Zimmer.

==== Results ====
1998 U.S. House election
Party	Candidate	Votes	%	±%
Democratic	Rush Holt Jr.	92,528	50.12%	▲2.77
Republican	Mike Pappas (incumbent)	87,221	47.25%	▼3.95
Independent	Joseph A. Siano	2,125	1.15%	N/A
Independent	Madelyn R. Hoffman	1,409	0.76%	N/A
Independent	Beverly Kidder	749	0.41%	N/A
Independent	Mary Jo Christian	578	0.31%	N/A
Total votes		184,610	100.00%	
Democratic gain from Republican		Swing	{{{swing}}}	

== District 13 ==
Incumbent Democrat Bob Menendez won. This district included parts of Essex, Hudson, Middlesex, and Union counties.

=== Democratic primary ===
==== Candidates ====
- Bob Menendez, incumbent Representative from Union City since 1993

==== Results ====
1998 Democratic primary
Party	Candidate	Votes	%
Democratic	Bob Menendez (incumbent)	25,067	100.00%
Total votes		25,067	100.00%

=== Republican primary ===
==== Candidates ====
- Theresa de Leon, attorney and chief financial officer for the Legal Aid Society of New York
- Carlos E. Munoz

==== Results ====
1998 Republican primary
Party	Candidate	Votes	%
Republican	Theresa de Leon	2,748	68.99%
Republican	Carlos E. Munoz	1,235	31.01%
Total votes		3,983	100.00%

=== General election ===
==== Candidates ====
- Susan Anmuth (Independent)
- Theresa de Leon, attorney and chief financial officer for the Legal Aid Society of New York (Republican)
- Dick Hester, Republican candidate for this district in 1996 (Independent)
- Bob Menendez, incumbent Representative from Union City since 1993 (Democratic)
- Richard G. Rivera (Independent)

==== Campaign ====
De Leon, a self-identified "progressive conservative", criticized Menendez for his ambition, arguing that he would seek to run for U.S. Senate in 2000 and neglect his duties to the district.

==== Results ====
1998 U.S. House election
Party	Candidate	Votes	%	±%
Democratic	Bob Menendez (incumbent)	70,306	80.06%	▲1.23
Republican	Theresa de Leon	14,615	16.64%	▼0.69
Independent	Dick Hester	1,276	1.45%	N/A
Independent	Richard G. Rivera	872	0.99%	N/A
Independent	Susan Anmuth	752	0.86%	N/A
Total votes		87,823	100.00%	
Democratic hold		Swing	{{{swing}}}	
