= 2000 United States House of Representatives elections in New Jersey =

- November 7, 2000

All 13 New Jersey seats to the United States House of Representatives
- Turnout: 70% (▲28pp)
	Majority party	Minority party
Party	Democratic	Republican
Last election	7	6
Seats won	7	6
Seat change	Steady	Steady
Popular vote	1,526,586	1,379,174
Percentage	51.27%	46.32%
Swing	▲1.57pp	▼0.96pp

Democratic
40–50%
50–60%
60–70%
70–80%
80–90%
Republican
50–60%
60–70%
70–80%

The 2000 United States House of Representatives elections in New Jersey were held on November 7, 2000, to determine who would represent the people of New Jersey in the United States House of Representatives. This election coincided with national elections for president, U.S. House and U.S. Senate. New Jersey had thirteen seats in the House, apportioned according to the 1990 United States census. Representatives are elected for two-year terms.

== Overview ==
2000 United States House of Representatives elections in New Jersey
Party	Votes	Percentage	Candidates	Seats	+/–
Democratic	1,526,586	51.27%	13	7	Steady
Republican	1,379,174	46.32%	13	6	Steady
Green	47,850	1.61%	12	0	Steady
Conservative	5,946	0.20%	7	0	Steady
Reform	3,426	0.12%	3	0	Steady
Libertarian	2,159	0.07%	2	0	Steady
Legalize Marijuana	1,959	0.07%	1	0	Steady
Socialist	788	0.03%	1	0	Steady
Natural Law	725	0.02%	2	0	Steady
Socialist Workers	704	0.02%	2	0	Steady
Constitution	562	0.02%	1	0	Steady
Independents	7,452	0.25%	6	0	Steady
Totals	2,977,331	100.00%	63	13	—

== District 1 ==
2000 New Jersey's 1st congressional district election
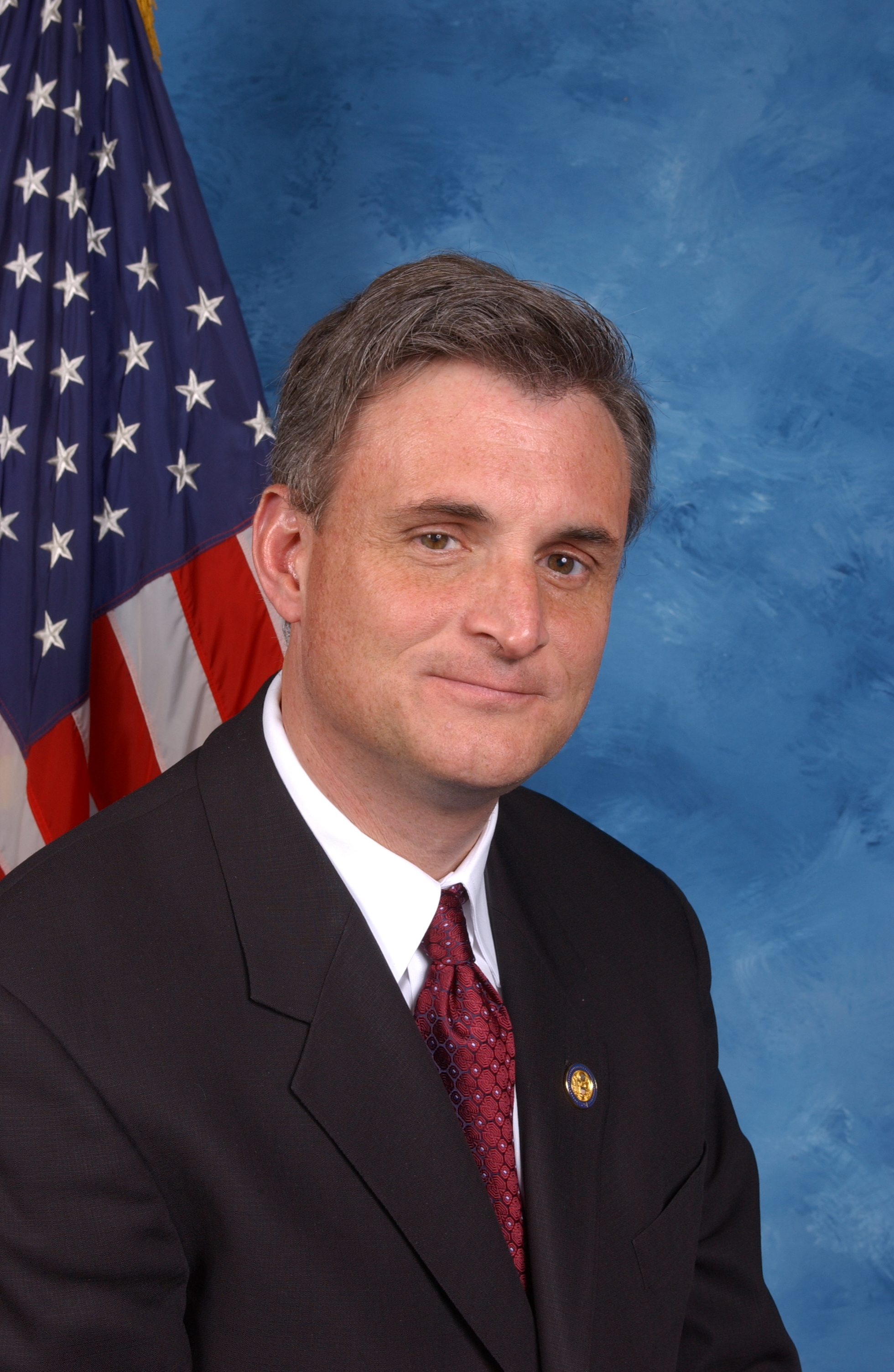

Nominee	Rob Andrews	Charlene Cathcart
Party	Democratic	Republican
Popular vote	167,327	46,455
Percentage	76.2%	21.1%
- County results Andrews: 70–80%
U.S. Representative before election
Rob Andrews
Democratic
Elected U.S. Representative
Rob Andrews
Democratic

Incumbent Democrat Rob Andrews won.

=== Democratic primary ===
==== Candidates ====
- Rob Andrews, incumbent representative from Haddon Heights since 1990

==== Results ====
2000 Democratic primary
Party	Candidate	Votes	%
Democratic	Rob Andrews (incumbent)	38,737	100.00%
Turnout		38,737	

=== Republican primary ===
==== Candidates ====
- Charlene Cathcart, tax attorney

==== Results ====
2000 Republican primary
Party	Candidate	Votes	%
Republican	Charlene Cathcart	9,877	100.00%
Turnout		9,877	

=== General election ===
==== Candidates ====
- Rob Andrews, incumbent representative from Haddon Heights since 1990 (Democratic)
- Charlene Cathcart, tax attorney (Republican)
- Ed Forchion, marijuana legalization activist (Legalize Marijuana)
- Catherine L. Parrish (Green)
- Joseph Patalivo (NJ Conservative)

==== Results ====
2000 U.S. House election
Party	Candidate	Votes	%
Democratic	Rob Andrews (incumbent)	167,327	76.19%
Republican	Charlene Cathcart	46,455	21.15%
Green	Catherine L. Parrish	3,090	1.41%
Legalize Marijuana Party	Ed Forchion	1,959	0.89%
Conservative	Joseph A. Patalivo	781	0.36%
Turnout		219,612	100.00%
Democratic hold			

== District 2 ==
2000 New Jersey's 2nd congressional district election
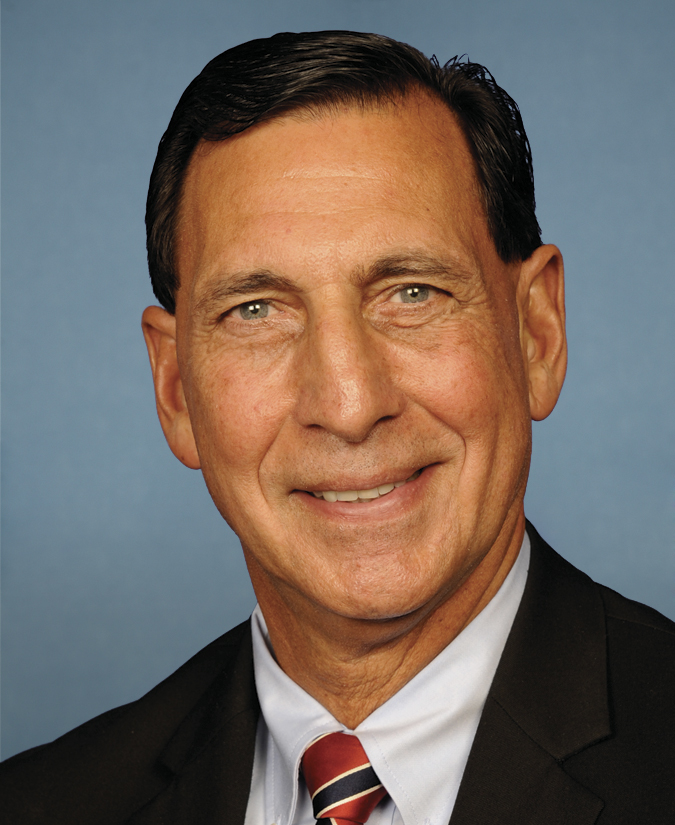

Nominee	Frank LoBiondo	Edward G. Janosik
Party	Republican	Democratic
Popular vote	155,187	74,632
Percentage	66.4%	31.9%
- County results LoBiondo: 60–70% 70–80% 80–90%
U.S. Representative before election
Frank LoBiondo
Republican
Elected U.S. Representative
Frank LoBiondo
Republican

Incumbent Republican Frank A. LoBiondo won.

=== Republican primary ===
==== Candidates ====
- Frank LoBiondo, incumbent representative since 1995

==== Results ====
2000 Republican primary
Party	Candidate	Votes	%
Republican	Frank LoBiondo (incumbent)	28,834	100.00%
Turnout		28,834	100.00%

=== Democratic primary ===
==== Candidates ====
- Steven A. Farkas
- Edward G. Janosik, retired political science professor

==== Results ====
2000 Democratic primary
Party	Candidate	Votes	%
Democratic	Edward G. Janosik	14,148	81.70%
Democratic	Steven A. Farkas	3,168	18.30%
Turnout		17,316	100.00%

=== General election ===
==== Candidates ====
- Robert Gabrielsky (Green) (Note: In Camden County, Gabrielsky was listed on the ballot as an Independent.)
- Edward G. Janosik, retired political science professor (Democratic)
- Frank LoBiondo, incumbent representative since 1995 (Republican)
- Constantino Rozzo (Socialist) (Note: In Camden County, Rozzo was listed on the ballot as an Independent.)

==== Results ====
2000 U.S. House election
Party	Candidate	Votes	%
Republican	Frank LoBiondo (incumbent)	155,187	66.36%
Democratic	Edward G. Janosik	74,632	31.91%
Green	Robert Gabrielsky	3,252	1.39%
Socialist	Constantino Rozzo	788	0.34%
Turnout		233,859	100.00%
Republican hold			

== District 3 ==
2000 New Jersey's 3rd congressional district election
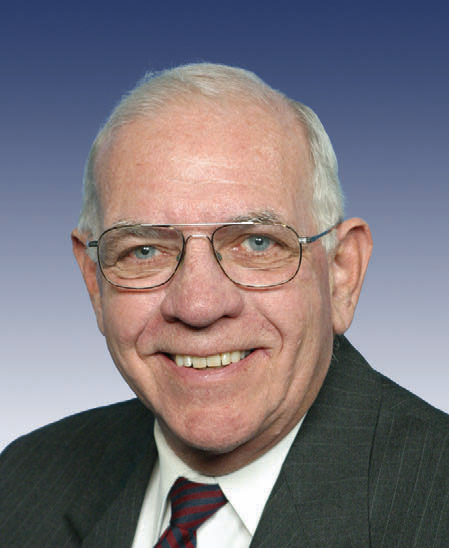

Nominee	Jim Saxton	Susan Bass Levin
Party	Republican	Democratic
Popular vote	157,053	112,848
Percentage	57.3%	41.2%
- County results Saxton: 50–60% Levin: 50–60%
U.S. Representative before election
Jim Saxton
Republican
Elected U.S. Representative
Jim Saxton
Republican

Incumbent Republican Jim Saxton won.

=== Republican primary ===
==== Candidates ====
- Jim Saxton, incumbent representative from Mount Holly since 1984

==== Results ====
2000 Republican primary
Party	Candidate	Votes	%
Republican	Jim Saxton (incumbent)	25,280	100.00%
Turnout		25,280	100.00%

=== Democratic primary ===
==== Candidates ====
- Susan Bass Levin, mayor of Cherry Hill

==== Results ====
2000 Democratic primary
Party	Candidate	Votes	%
Democratic	Susan Bass Levin	24,241	100.00%
Turnout		24,241	100.00%

=== General election ===
==== Candidates ====
- Ken Feduniewicz (Reform)
- Aaron M. Kromash (Green)
- Susan Bass Levin, mayor of Cherry Hill (Democratic)
- Jim Saxton, incumbent representative from Mount Holly since 1984 (Republican)
- Norman E. Wahner (NJ Conservative)

==== Results ====
2000 U.S. House election
Party	Candidate	Votes	%
Republican	Jim Saxton (incumbent)	157,053	57.30%
Democratic	Susan Bass Levin	112,848	41.17%
Green	Aaron M. Kromash	2,515	0.92%
Reform	Ken Feduniewicz	948	0.35%
Conservative	Norman E. Wahner	719	0.26%
Turnout		274,083	100.00%
Republican hold			

== District 4 ==
2000 New Jersey's 4th congressional district election
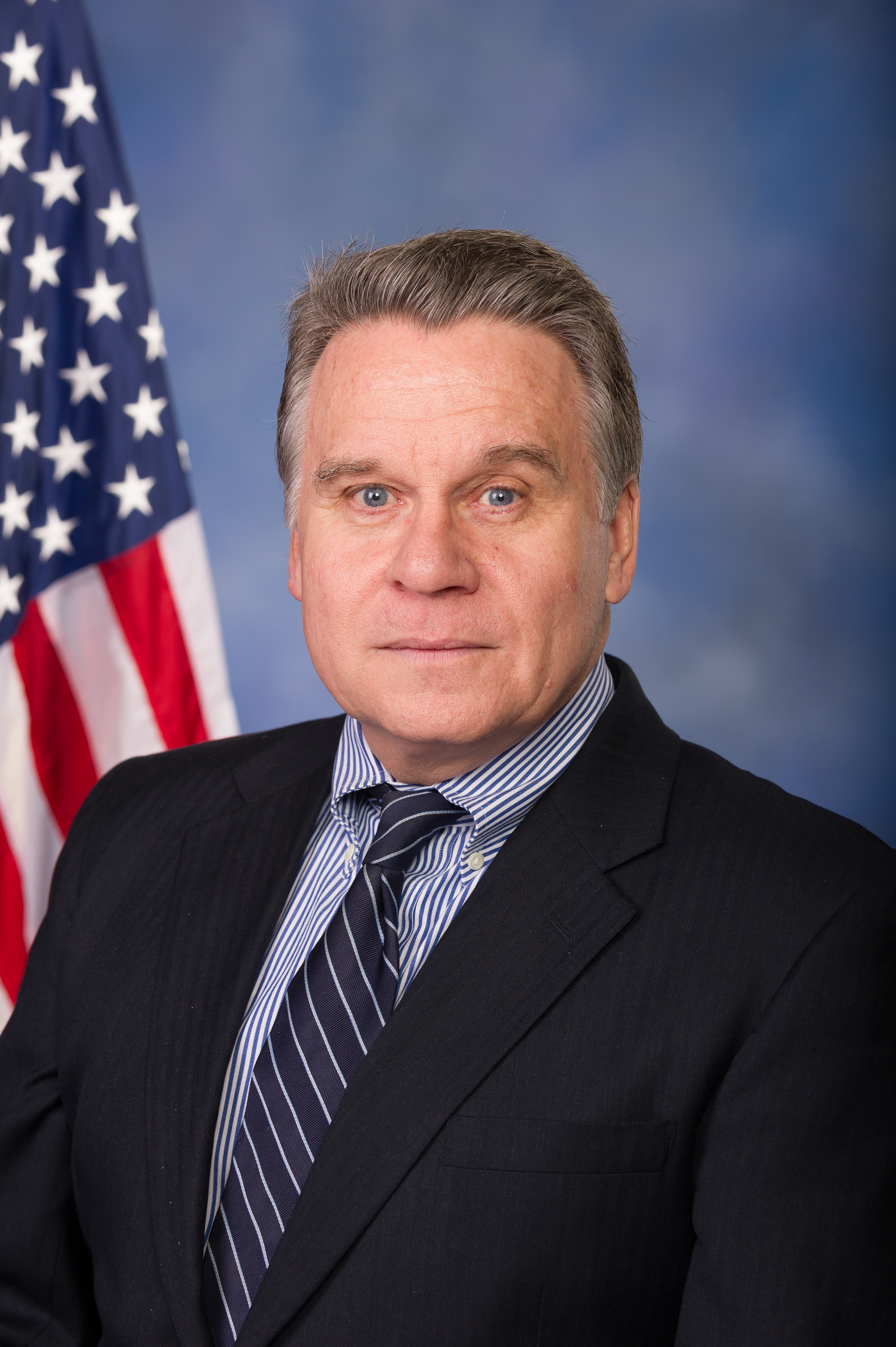

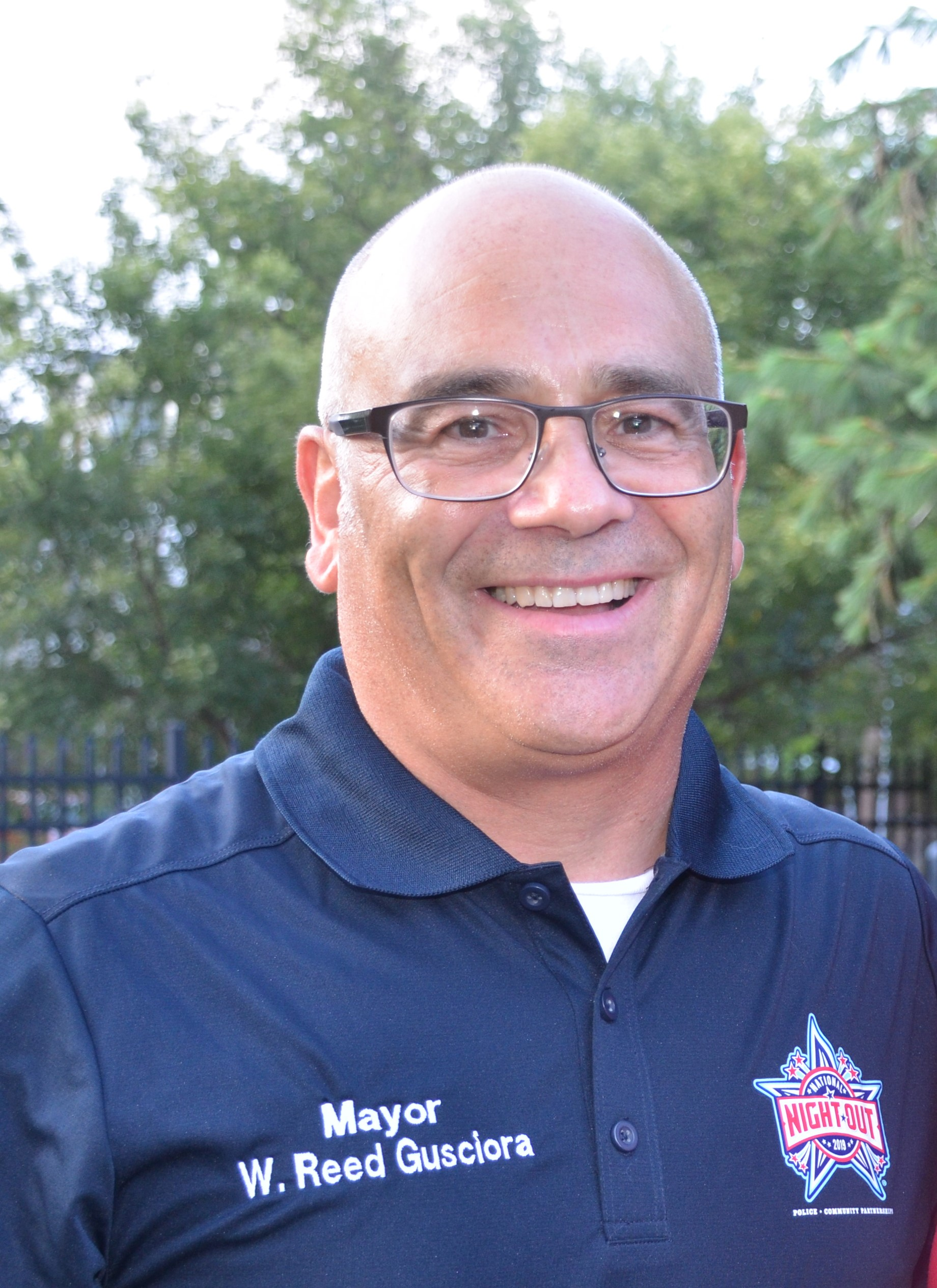
Nominee	Chris Smith	Reed Gusciora
Party	Republican	Democratic
Popular vote	158,515	87,956
Percentage	63.2%	35.1%
- County results Smith: 50–60% 60–70% 70–80%
U.S. Representative before election
Chris Smith
Republican
Elected U.S. Representative
Chris Smith
Republican

Incumbent Republican Chris Smith won.

=== Republican primary ===
==== Candidates ====
- Chris Smith, incumbent representative since 1981

==== Results ====
2000 Republican primary
Party	Candidate	Votes	%
Republican	Chris Smith (incumbent)	20,062	100.00%
Turnout		20,062	100.00%

=== Democratic primary ===
==== Candidates ====
- Reed Gusciora, assemblyman from Princeton

===== Withdrew =====
- Larry Schneider

==== Results ====
2000 Democratic primary
Party	Candidate	Votes	%
Democratic	Reed Gusciora	18,952	100.00%
Turnout		18,952	100.00%

=== General election ===
==== Candidates ====
- Stuart Chaifetz (Green)
- Reed Gusciora, assemblyman from Princeton (Democratic)
- Chris Smith, incumbent representative from Robbinsville since 1981 (Republican)
- Paul D. Teel (Unthinkable Courage)

==== Results ====
2000 U.S. House election
Party	Candidate	Votes	%
Republican	Chris Smith (incumbent)	158,515	63.20%
Democratic	Reed Gusciora	87,956	35.07%
Green	Stuart Chaifetz	3,627	1.45%
Independent	Paul D. Teel	712	0.28%
Turnout		250,810	100.00%
Republican hold			

== District 5 ==
2000 New Jersey's 5th congressional district election
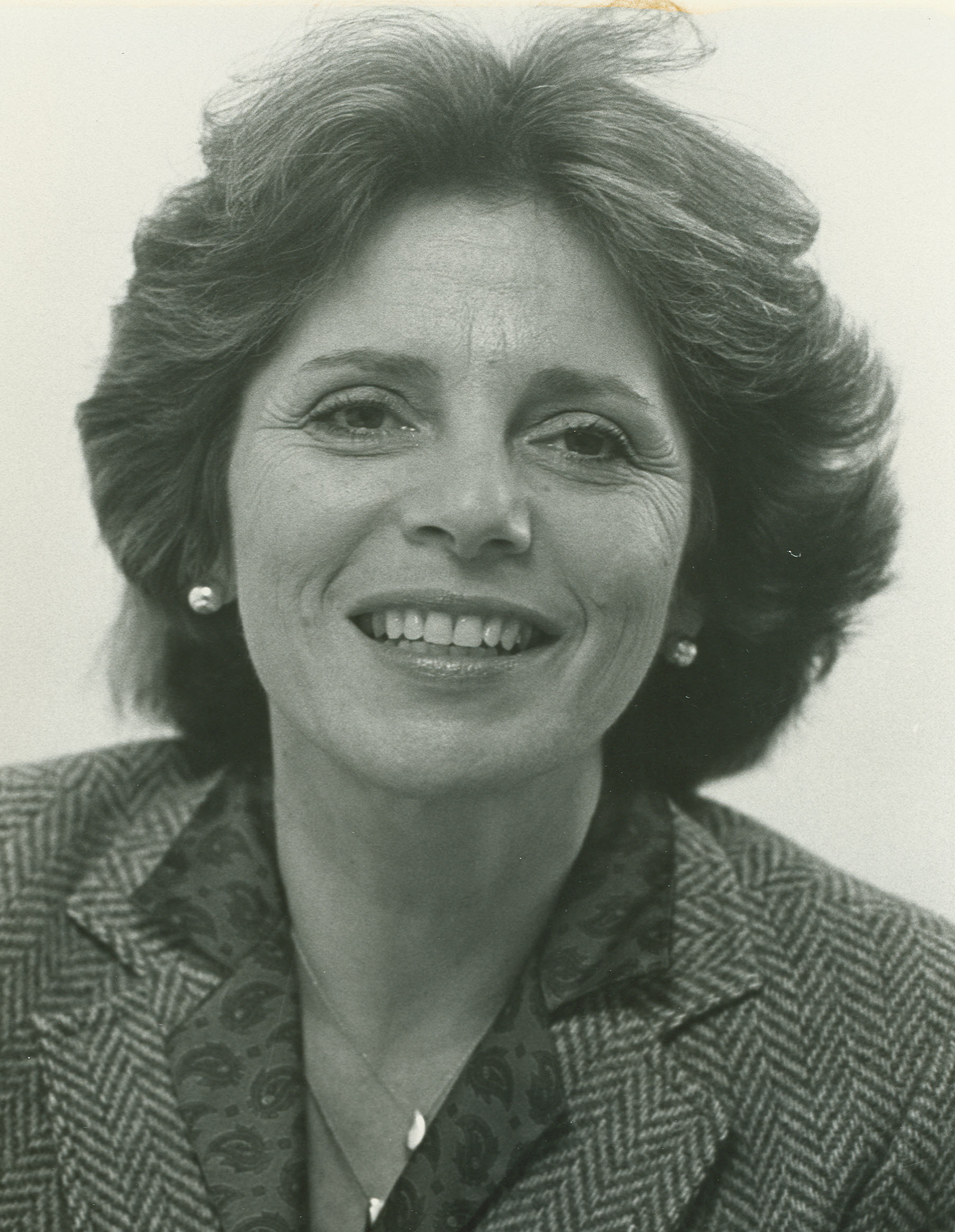

Nominee	Marge Roukema	Linda A. Mercurio
Party	Republican	Democratic
Popular vote	175,546	81,715
Percentage	65.4%	30.4%
- County results Roukema: 60–70%
U.S. Representative before election
Marge Roukema
Republican
Elected U.S. Representative
Marge Roukema
Republican

Incumbent Marge Roukema won after facing a strong primary challenge from Assemblyman Scott Garrett for the second consecutive election.

=== Republican primary ===
==== Candidates ====
- Scott Garrett, assemblyman from Wantage and candidate for this seat in 1998
- Marge Roukema, incumbent representative from Ridgewood since 1981

==== Results ====
2000 Republican primary
Party	Candidate	Votes	%
Republican	Marge Roukema (incumbent)	23,043	52.26%
Republican	Scott Garrett	21,051	47.74%
Turnout		44,094	100.00%

=== Democratic primary ===
==== Candidates ====
- Linda A. Mercurio, independent assembly candidate for New Jersey's 39th legislative district in 1999

==== Results ====
2000 Democratic primary
Party	Candidate	Votes	%
Democratic	Linda A. Mercurio	14,743	100.00%
Turnout		14,743	

=== General election ===
==== Candidates ====
- Ira Goodman (Reform)
- Helen Hamilton (Natural Law)
- Michael King (Green)
- Robert J. McCafferty (New Jersey Independents)
- Linda A. Mercurio, independent assembly candidate for New Jersey's 39th legislative district in 1999 (Democratic)
- Marge Roukema, incumbent representative from Ridgewood since 1981 (Republican)

==== Results ====
2000 U.S. House election
Party	Candidate	Votes	%
Republican	Marge Roukema (incumbent)	175,546	65.37%
Democratic	Linda A. Mercurio	81,715	30.43%
Green	Michael King	5,329	1.98%
Independent	Robert J. McCafferty	4,095	1.53%
Reform	Ira W. Goodman	1,358	0.51%
Natural Law	Helen Hamilton	481	0.18%
Turnout		268,524	100.00%
Republican hold			

== District 6 ==
2000 New Jersey's 6th congressional district election
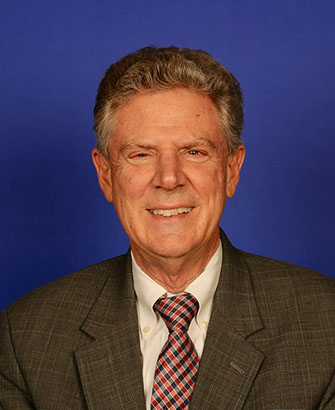

Nominee	Frank Pallone Jr.	Brian T. Kennedy
Party	Democratic	Republican
Popular vote	141,698	62,454
Percentage	67.5%	29.8%
- County results Pallone: 60–70%
U.S. Representative before election
Frank Pallone Jr.
Democratic
Elected U.S. Representative
Frank Pallone Jr.
Democratic

Incumbent Democrat Frank Pallone won.

=== Democratic primary ===
==== Candidates ====
- Frank Pallone, incumbent representative from Long Branch since 1988

==== Results ====
2000 Democratic primary
Party	Candidate	Votes	%
Democratic	Frank Pallone (incumbent)	24,475	100.00%
Turnout		24,475	

=== Republican primary ===
==== Candidates ====
- Charles T. Hutchins
- Brian T. Kennedy, former state senator and assemblyman from Sea Girt and candidate for U.S. Senate in 1994

===== Withdrew =====
- Mike Ferguson, Brookdale College teacher and nominee for this district in 1998 (ran for 7th district)

==== Results ====
2000 Republican primary
Party	Candidate	Votes	%
Republican	Brian T. Kennedy	5,683	65.98%
Republican	Charles T. Hutchins	2,930	34.02%
Turnout		8,613	

=== General election ===
==== Candidates ====
- Earl Gray (Green)
- Brian T. Kennedy, former state senator and assemblyman from Sea Girt and candidate for U.S. Senate in 1994 (Republican)
- Sylvia Kuzmak (NJ Conservative)
- Frank Pallone, incumbent representative from Long Branch since 1988 (Democratic)
- Karen Zaletel (Reform)

==== Results ====
2000 U.S. House election
Party	Candidate	Votes	%
Democratic	Frank Pallone Jr. (incumbent)	141,698	67.52%
Republican	Brian T. Kennedy	62,454	29.76%
Green	Earl Gray	4,252	2.03%
Reform	Karen Zaletel	1,120	0.53%
Conservative	Sylvia Kuzmak	328	0.16%
Turnout		209,852	
Democratic hold			

== District 7 ==
2000 New Jersey's 7th congressional district election
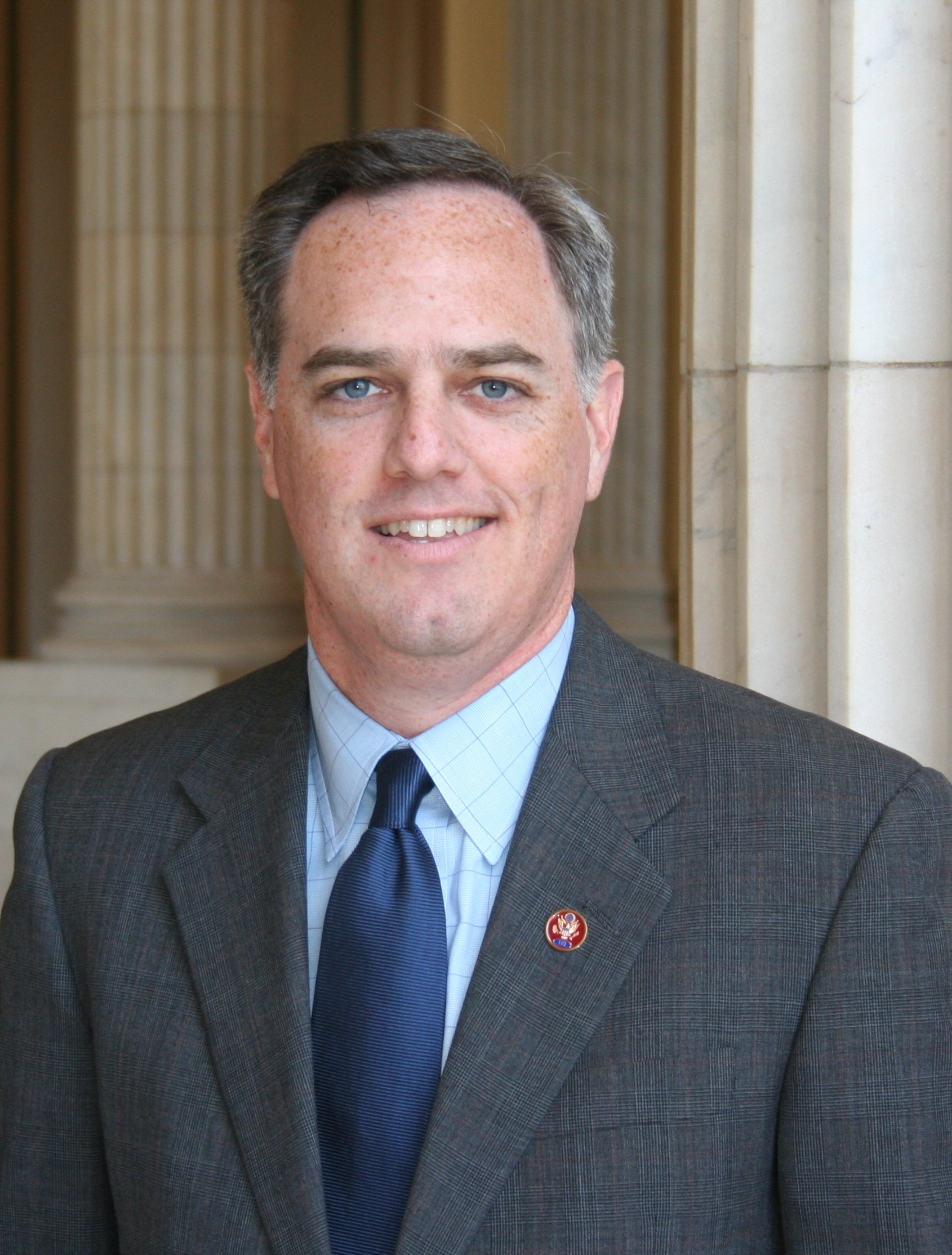

Nominee	Mike Ferguson	Maryanne Connelly
Party	Republican	Democratic
Popular vote	123,438	107,825
Percentage	51.8%	45.3%
U.S. Representative before election
Bob Franks
Republican
Elected U.S. Representative
Mike Ferguson
Republican

Incumbent Representative Bob Franks announced in December 1999 that he would not seek re-election to his seat in the House, in order to run for the United States Senate seat being vacated by Frank Lautenberg. His announcement left the 7th district seat open and hotly contested, with eight candidates declaring their campaigns for the major parties' nominations.

In the June primary, Mike Ferguson and Maryanne Connelly won the Republican and Democratic nominations, respectively. The general election was also sharply contested between the two parties; the Democratic Party cited this seat as one of their top opportunities in the country. In June, prior to the primaries, a national Democratic spokesman said, "It's one of our best opportunities in the country to pick up a Republican-held seat. It's a competitive open seat with a suburban electorate that has been trending Democratic."

In the end, Ferguson narrowly won the open seat over Connelly.

=== Republican primary ===
==== Candidates ====
- Mike Ferguson, Brookdale College teacher and nominee for New Jersey's 6th congressional district in 1998
- Thomas Kean Jr., former aide to Bob Franks and son of former governor Thomas Kean
- Patrick Morrissey, deputy staff director and chief health counsel for the United States House Committee on Energy and Commerce
- Joel Weingarten, assemblyman from Millburn

===== Withdrew =====
- Ken Gardner Jr., member of the Woodbridge Township Council and chair of the Woodbridge Republican Party
- Roderick McNealy, Hillsborough resident
- Patricia L. Walsh, member of the Green Brook Township Council

===== Declined =====
- Bob Franks, incumbent representative from Summit since 1993 (ran for U.S. Senate)

==== Campaign ====
Franks's decision in December 1999 to run for U.S. Senate set off a scramble to establish residency; three of the four eventual candidates did not live in the district at the time of Franks's announcement. Mike Ferguson, a Monmouth County teacher who was running as a candidate in the adjacent 6th district, moved into the 7th; Tom Kean Jr., the son of the former governor, was studying international relations at the Fletcher School of Law and Diplomacy in Boston; and Patrick Morrissey, a U.S. House staffer, relocated from Washington to run. Only Assemblyman Joel Weingarten, a resident of Millburn, actually lived in the district at the time Franks announced his campaign for U.S. Senate.

Weingarten made an issue of his opponents' residencies. was also the oldest of the four candidates, at only 40 years.

Kean, the son of a popular former governor and one of the state's most prominent political families, was the early favorite for the nomination in polling and the only candidate with significant name recognition. However, he lost the support of the county parties to Ferguson and Weingarten. Kean was also the most liberal of the four candidates on gun control and abortion.

In the final weeks of the campaign, observers considered Ferguson and Weingarten the favorites.

==== Endorsements ====
Mike Ferguson

Political parties

- Middlesex County Republican Party
- Somerset County Republican Party
Thomas Kean Jr.

State legislators

- Donald DiFrancesco, state senator from Scotch Plains and president of the New Jersey Senate
Joel Weingarten

Political parties

- Union County Republican Party

=== Democratic primary ===
==== Candidates ====
- Maryanne Connelly, mayor of Fanwood and nominee for this seat in 1998
- Joel Farley, Westfield lawyer
- Jeffrey Golkin, member of the Warren Township Committee
- Mike Lapolla, former Union County freeholder

===== Withdrew =====
- J. Brooke Hern, New Providence attorney and former Robert Torricelli staffer

==== Campaign ====
Maryanne Connelly, the party's nominee in 1998, had performed surprisingly well against Franks, a popular incumbent. Party leadership appeared prepared to nominate her against Franks again in 2000, but upon Franks's decision to run for U.S. Senate, they endorsed Mike Lapolla. Lapolla received further support from the Democratic Congressional Campaign Committee, a rare pre-primary endorsement from the national body.

A candidate debate on May 2 revealed few differences between the four contenders, who each favored Medicaid expansion, stricter gun control, and a right to abortion.

Although Lapolla was considered a strong front-runner, he surprised observers with a sharp radio attack ad against Connelly, in which an actress plays Ms. Connelly as a contestant on a quiz show titled, ''Who Wants to Be a Member of Congress?'' In the ad, the Connelly character is questioned on her positions and requests a weather report so she can see ''which way the political winds are blowing.'' Connelly criticized the ad as sexist, and she received the endorsements of the National Organization for Women and EMILY's List.

==== Endorsements ====
Maryanne Connelly

Organizations

- EMILY's List
- National Organization for Women
Mike Lapolla

State legislators

- Rudy Garcia, assemblyman and mayor of Union City

Political parties

- Middlesex County Democratic Party
- Somerset County Democratic Party
- Union County Democratic Party

Organizations

- Democratic Congressional Campaign Committee

=== General election ===
==== Candidates ====
- Jerry Coleman (Green)
- Maryanne Connelly, mayor of Fanwood and nominee for this seat in 1998 (Democratic)
- Mike Ferguson, Brookdale College teacher and nominee for New Jersey's 6th congressional district in 1998 (Republican)
- Shawn Gianella (NJ Conservative)
- Mary T. Johnson (Natural Law)
- Darren Young (Libertarian)

==== Campaign ====
During the campaign, Rutgers University sophomore Frank Perrone Jr. was arrested for stealing Ferguson campaign signs.

==== Polling ====
Poll source	Date(s)	Sample size	Margin of error	Mike Ferguson (R)	Maryanne Connelly (D)	Other / undecided (Note: Calculated by taking the difference of 100% and all other candidates combined.)
Diversified Research Inc (R) (Note: Poll conducted for Mike Ferguson.)	October 19, 2000	300	—	44%	33%	23%

==== Results ====
2000 U.S. House election
Party	Candidate	Votes	%
Republican	Mike Ferguson	123,438	51.84%
Democratic	Maryanne Connelly	107,825	45.29%
Green	Jerry L. Coleman	5,292	2.22%
Libertarian	Darren Young	934	0.39%
Conservative	Shawn Gianella	364	0.15%
Natural Law	Mary T. Johnson	244	0.10%
Turnout		237,853	100.00%
Republican hold			

== District 8 ==
2000 New Jersey's 8th congressional district election
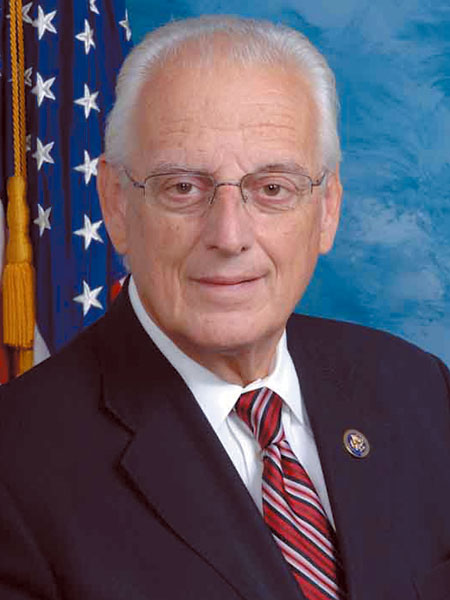

Nominee	Bill Pascrell Jr.	Anthony Fusco Jr.
Party	Democratic	Republican
Popular vote	134,074	60,606
Percentage	67.0%	30.3%
- County results Pascrell: 60–70%
U.S. Representative before election
Bill Pascrell Jr.
Democratic
Elected U.S. Representative
Bill Pascrell Jr.
Democratic

Incumbent Democrat Bill Pascrell won.

=== Democratic primary ===
==== Candidates ====
- Bill Pascrell, incumbent representative from Paterson since 1997

==== Results ====
2000 Democratic primary
Party	Candidate	Votes	%
Democratic	Bill Pascrell (incumbent)	23,701	100.00%
Turnout		23,701	

=== Republican primary ===
==== Candidates ====
- Anthony Fusco Jr., former East Hanover Township attorney
- Bernard Anthony George

==== Results ====
2000 Republican primary
Party	Candidate	Votes	%
Republican	Anthony Fusco Jr.	8,690	78.89%
Republican	Bernard Anthony George	2,325	21.11%
Turnout		11,015	100.00%

=== General election ===
==== Candidates ====
- Joseph Fortunato (Green)
- Anthony Fusco Jr., former East Hanover Township attorney (Republican)
- Bill Pascrell, incumbent representative from Paterson since 1997 (Democratic)
- Viji Sargis (New Jersey Independents)

==== Results ====
2000 U.S. House election
Party	Candidate	Votes	%
Democratic	Bill Pascrell Jr. (incumbent)	134,074	66.99%
Republican	Anthony Fusco Jr.	60,606	30.28%
Green	Joseph Fortunato	4,469	2.23%
Independent	Viji Sargis	983	0.49%
Turnout		200,132	100.00%
Democratic hold			

== District 9 ==
2000 New Jersey's 9th congressional district election
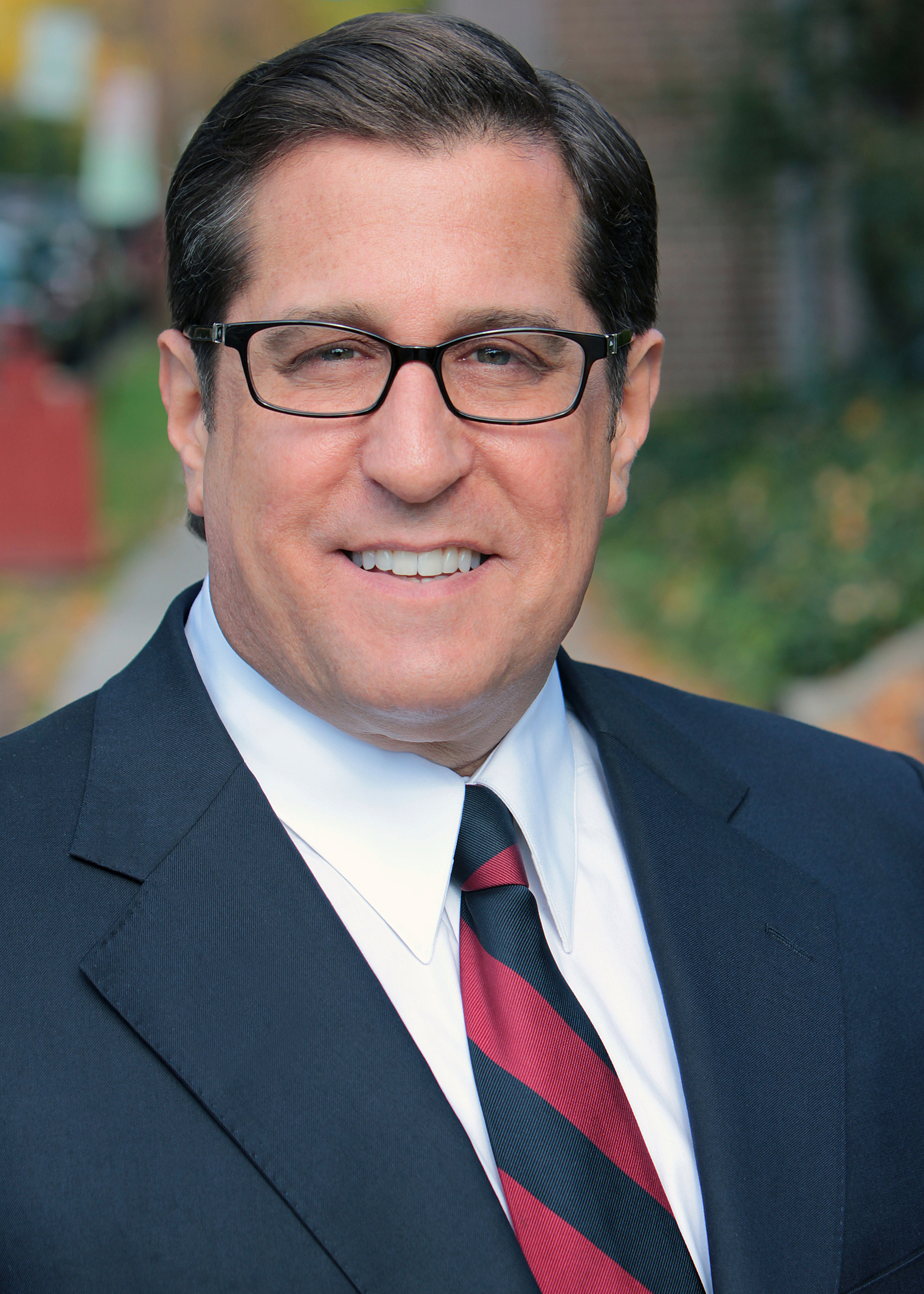

Nominee	Steve Rothman	Joseph Tedeschi
Party	Democratic	Republican
Popular vote	140,462	61,984
Percentage	67.9%	30.0%
- County results Rothman: 60–70% 70–80%
U.S. Representative before election
Steve Rothman
Democratic
Elected U.S. Representative
Steve Rothman
Democratic

Incumbent Democrat Steve Rothman won.

=== Democratic primary ===
==== Candidates ====
- Steve Rothman, incumbent representative from Fair Lawn since 1997

==== Results ====
2000 Democratic primary
Party	Candidate	Votes	%
Democratic	Steve Rothman (incumbent)	25,686	100.00%
Turnout		25,686	

=== Republican primary ===
==== Candidates ====
- Joseph Tedeschi

==== Results ====
2000 Republican primary
Party	Candidate	Votes	%
Republican	Joseph Tedeschi	7,091	100.00%
Turnout		7,091	

=== General election ===
==== Candidates ====
- Robert Corriston (NJ Conservative)
- Lewis Pell (Green)
- Michael Perrone Jr. (Independent/Progressive)
- Steve Rothman, incumbent representative from Fair Lawn since 1997 (Democratic)
- Joseph Tedeschi (Republican)

==== Results ====
2000 U.S. House election
Party	Candidate	Votes	%
Democratic	Steve Rothman (incumbent)	140,462	67.93%
Republican	Joseph Tedeschi	61,984	29.98%
Green	Lewis Pell	2,273	1.10%
Independent	Michael Perrone Jr.	1,072	0.52%
Conservative	Robert Corriston	980	0.47%
Turnout		206,771	100.00%
Democratic hold			

== District 10 ==
2000 New Jersey's 10th congressional district election
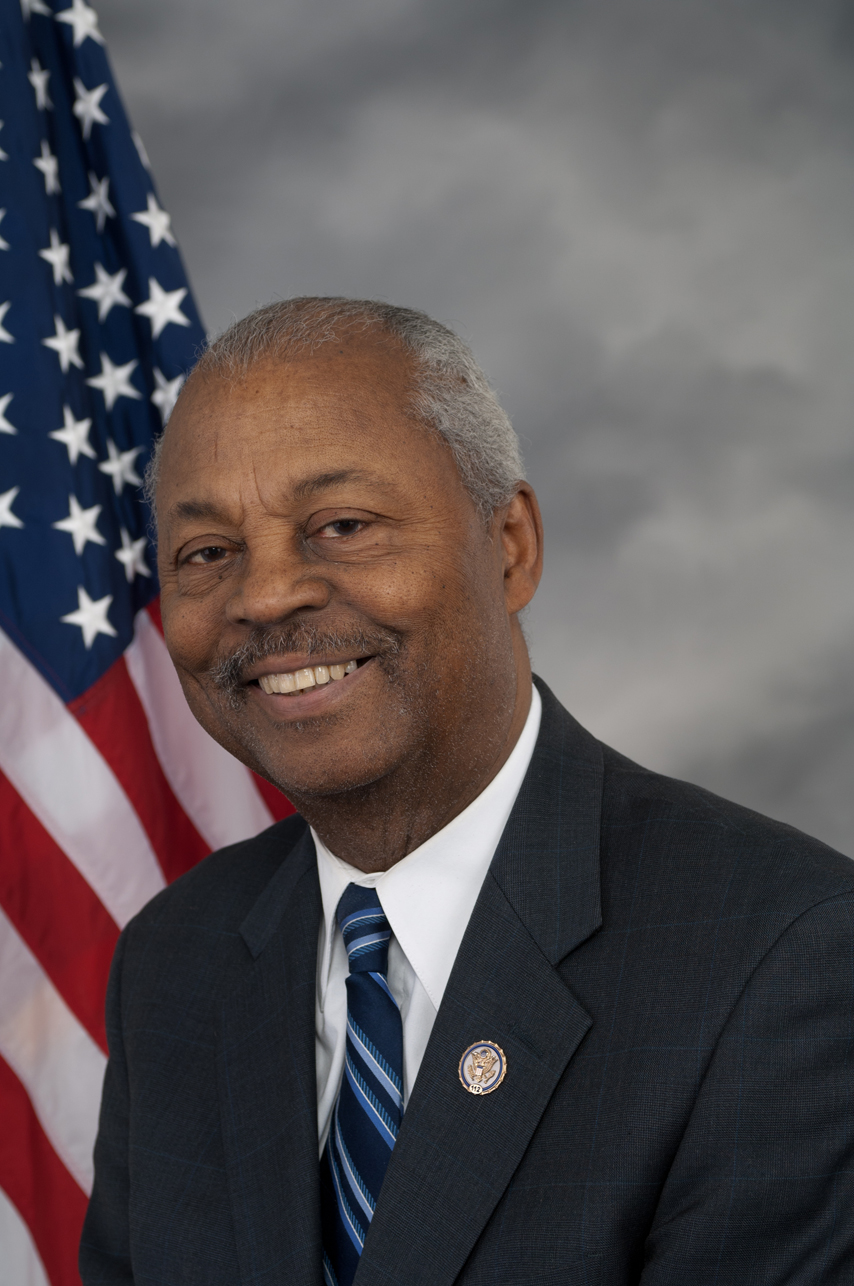

Nominee	Donald M. Payne	Dirk B. Weber
Party	Democratic	Republican
Popular vote	133,073	18,436
Percentage	87.5%	12.1%
- County results Payne: 70–80% 80–90% 90–100%
U.S. Representative before election
Donald M. Payne
Democratic
Elected U.S. Representative
Donald M. Payne
Democratic

Incumbent Democrat Donald M. Payne won.

=== Democratic primary ===
==== Candidates ====
- Donald M. Payne, incumbent representative from Newark since 1989

==== Results ====
2000 Democratic primary
Party	Candidate	Votes	%
Democratic	Donald M. Payne (incumbent)	45,880	100.00%
Turnout		45,880	100.00%

=== Republican primary ===
==== Candidates ====
- Dirk B. Weber

==== Withdrew ====
- Rocky Flash, professional wrestler and race car driver

==== Results ====
2000 Republican primary
Party	Candidate	Votes	%
Republican	Dirk B. Weber	1,492	100.00%
Turnout		1,492	100.00%

=== General election ===
==== Candidates ====
- Donald M. Payne, incumbent representative from Newark since 1989 (Democratic)
- Dirk B. Weber (Republican)
- Maurice Williams (Socialist Workers)

==== Results ====
2000 U.S. House election
Party	Candidate	Votes	%
Democratic	Donald M. Payne (incumbent)	133,073	87.52%
Republican	Dirk B. Weber	18,436	12.13%
Socialist Workers	Maurice Williams	536	0.35%
Turnout		152,045	
Democratic hold			

== District 11 ==
2000 New Jersey's 11th congressional district election
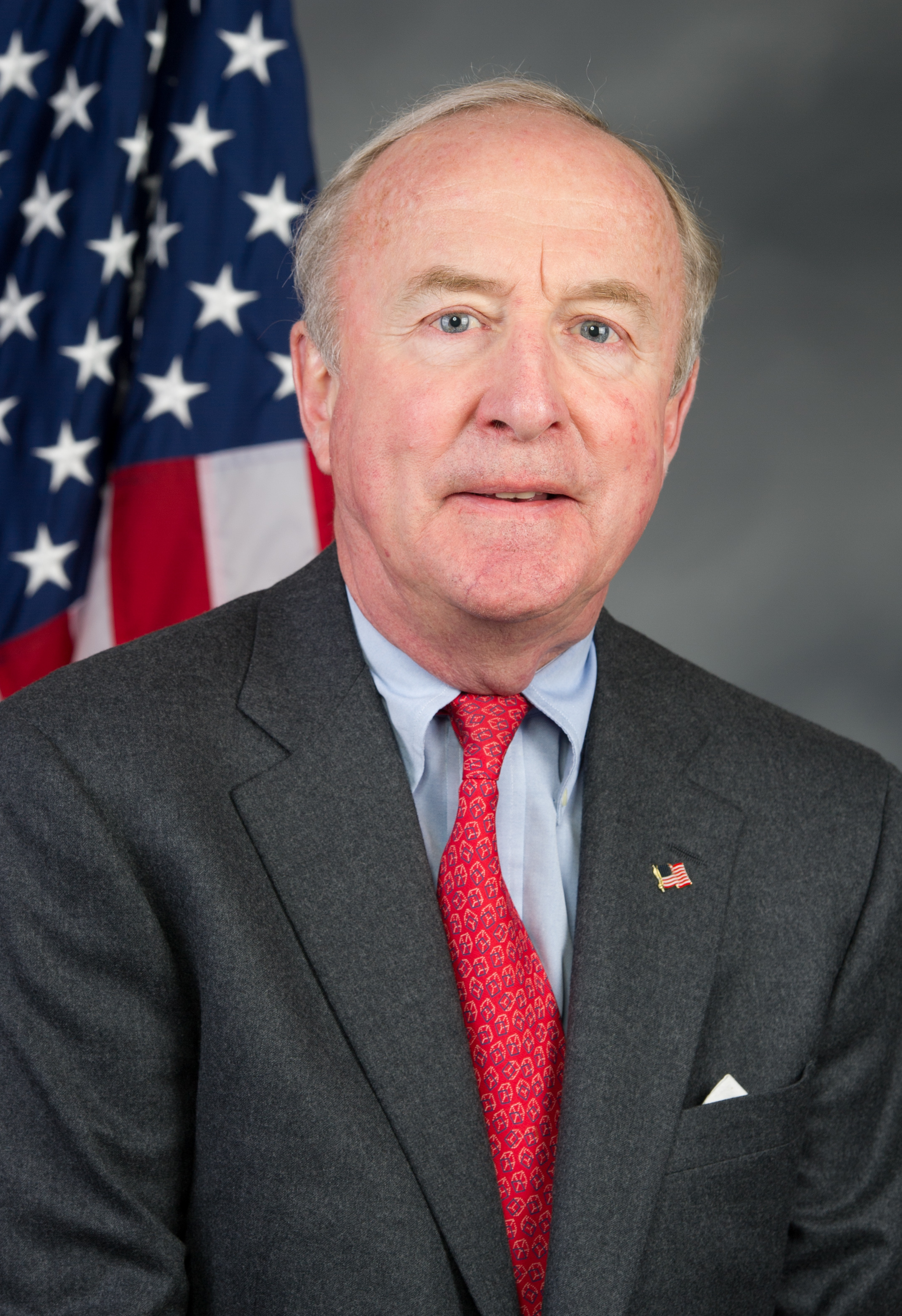

Nominee	Rodney Frelinghuysen	John P. Scollo
Party	Republican	Democratic
Popular vote	186,140	80,958
Percentage	68.0%	29.6%
- County results Frelinghuysen: 50–60% 60–70% 70–80%
U.S. Representative before election
Rodney Frelinghuysen
Republican
Elected U.S. Representative
Rodney Frelinghuysen
Republican

Incumbent Republican Rodney Frelinghuysen won.

=== Republican primary ===
==== Candidates ====
- Rodney Frelinghuysen, incumbent representative since 1995

===== Campaign =====
Filmmaker Michael Moore attempted to enter a ficus tree in the Republican primary against Frelinghuysen, but state election officials refused to certify its nominating petitions, forcing Moore to run a write-in campaign for the tree instead.

==== Results ====
2000 Republican primary
Party	Candidate	Votes	%
Republican	Rodney Frelinghuysen (incumbent)	35,820	100.00%
Turnout		35,820	100.00%

=== Democratic primary ===
==== Candidates ====
- John P. Scollo

==== Results ====
2000 Democratic primary
Party	Candidate	Votes	%
Democratic	John P. Scollo	15,419	100.00%
Turnout		15,419	100.00%

=== General election ===
==== Candidates ====
- Rodney Frelinghuysen, incumbent representative from Harding since 1995 (Republican)
- John Pickarski (Green)
- John P. Scollo (Democratic)
- James E. Spinosa (NJ Conservative)

==== Results ====
2000 U.S. House election
Party	Candidate	Votes	%
Republican	Rodney Frelinghuysen (incumbent)	186,140	67.97%
Democratic	John P. Scollo	80,958	29.56%
Green	John Pickarski	5,199	1.90%
Conservative	James E. Spinosa	1,541	0.56%
Turnout		273,838	100.00%
Republican hold			

== District 12 ==
2000 New Jersey's 12th congressional district election
- November 7, 2000
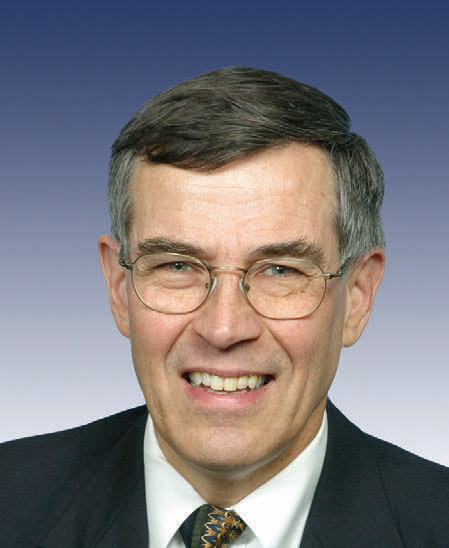

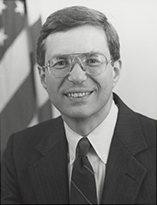
Nominee	Rush Holt Jr.	Dick Zimmer
Party	Democratic	Republican
Popular vote	146,162	145,511
Percentage	48.7%	48.5%
- County results Holt: 50–60% 60–70% Zimmer: 40–50% 60–70%
U.S. Representative before election
Rush Holt Jr.
Democratic
Elected U.S. Representative
Rush Holt Jr.
Democratic

Incumbent Democrat Rush Holt Jr. won re-election to a second term in office, defeating former Representative Dick Zimmer by under 700 votes.

In the Republican primary, Zimmer easily defeated his successor, one-term Representative Mike Pappas, who was seeking a return to Congress after losing the 1998 election to Holt.

=== Democratic primary ===
==== Candidates ====
- Rush Holt Jr., incumbent representative from Pennington since 1999

==== Results ====
2000 Democratic primary
Party	Candidate	Votes	%
Democratic	Rush Holt (incumbent)	27,104	100.00%
Turnout		27,104	

=== Republican primary ===
==== Candidates ====
- Mike Pappas, former representative for this district (1997–99)
- Dick Zimmer, former representative for this district (1991–97) and nominee for U.S. Senate in 1996

===== Declined =====
- Leonard Lance, assemblyman and candidate for this district in 1996

==== Campaign ====
Pappas, who lost his seat in embarrassing fashion after singing "Twinkle, Twinkle, Kenneth Star" on the floor of the House in 1998, ran for the Republican nomination. He faced his predecessor Dick Zimmer, who had given up the seat to run for U.S. Senate in 1996.

Pappas was positioned as a strong conservative, while Zimmer was noted for his moderate stances on social issues. Zimmer had the support of most of the Republican Party establishment in the state, including governors Christine Todd Whitman and Tom Kean, party chair Chuck Haytaian, and all five county Republican organizations in the district, and supporters argued that he would be more likely to unseat Holt in the general election. Pappas had impassioned support from social conservatives, including opponents of abortion and gun control.

The race was largely civil until May, when Zimmer began running radio advertisements with recordings of Zimmer singing "Twinkle, Twinkle, Kenneth Starr" and Pappas sent out mailers accusing Zimmer of inspiring the state income tax during his time as head of Common Cause in the 1970s. Zimmer's campaign was generally better funded and able to advertise, while Pappas relied on grassroots support and direct voter outreach.

==== Endorsements ====
Mike Pappas

U.S. representatives

- Dick Armey, U.S. representative from Texas's 26th district and House majority leader
- Tom DeLay, U.S. representative from Texas's 22nd district and House majority whip

Organizations

- New Jersey Right to Life
- New Jersey Sportsman Association

Individuals

- Thomas Kean, former governor of New Jersey
- Phyllis Schlafly, president of the Eagle Forum
Dick Zimmer

Governors

- Christine Todd Whitman, governor of New Jersey

U.S. representatives

- Thomas M. Davis III, U.S. representative from Virginia's 11th district and chair of the National Republican Congressional Committee
- Dennis Hastert, U.S. representative from Illinois's 14th district and speaker of the House

State legislators

- Chuck Haytaian, chair of the New Jersey Republican Party and former speaker of the New Jersey General Assembly

Political parties

- Hunterdon County Republican Party
- Mercer County Republican Party
- Middlesex County Republican Party
- Monmouth County Republican Party
- Somerset County Republican Party

==== Results ====
2000 Republican primary
Party	Candidate	Votes	%
Republican	Dick Zimmer	19,084	62.01%
Republican	Mike Pappas	11,692	37.99%
Turnout		30,776	100.00%

=== General election ===
==== Candidates ====
- John P. Desmond (NJ Conservative)
- Rush Holt Jr., incumbent representative from Pennington since 1999 (Democratic)
- Carl Mayer, runner-up for the Democratic nomination in this district in 1996 and 1998 (Green)
- Worth Winslow (Libertarian)
- Dick Zimmer, former representative for this district (1991–97) and nominee for U.S. Senate in 1996 (Republican)

==== Results ====
2000 U.S. House election
Party	Candidate	Votes	%
Democratic	Rush Holt (incumbent)	146,162	48.73%
Republican	Dick Zimmer	145,511	48.51%
Green	Carl Mayer	5,811	1.94%
Conservative	John P. Desmond	1,233	0.41%
Libertarian	Worth Winslow	1,225	0.41%
Turnout		299,942	100.00%
Democratic hold			

== District 13 ==
2000 New Jersey's 13th congressional district election
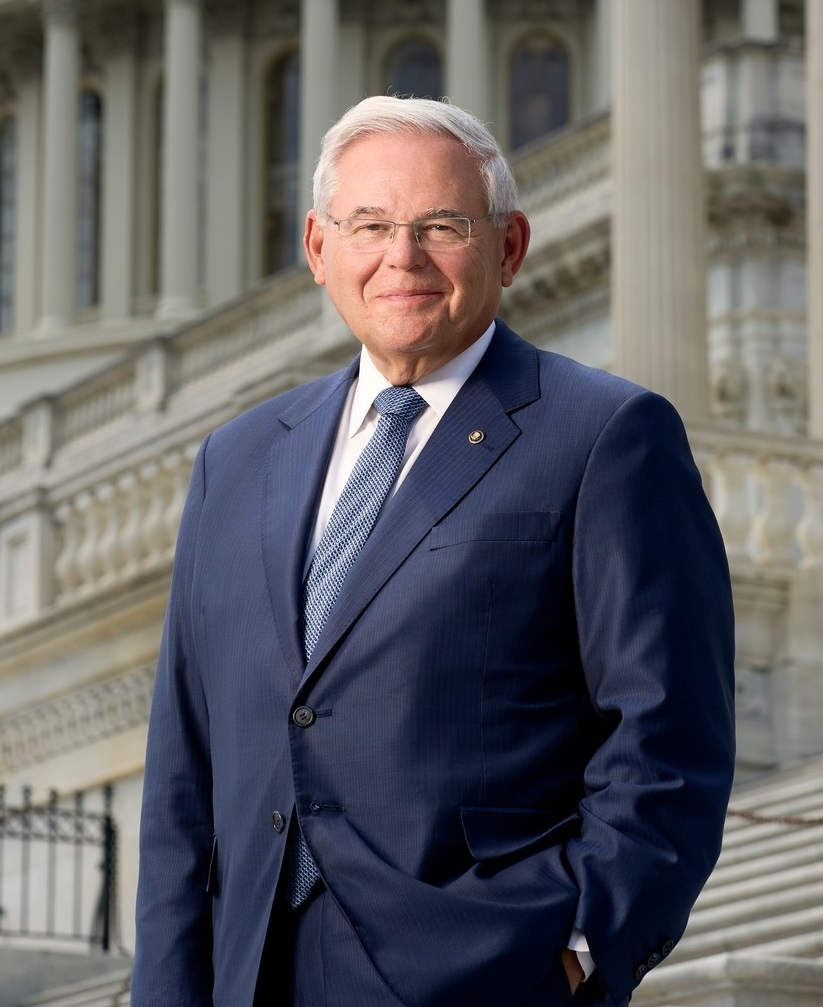

Nominee	Bob Menendez	Theresa de Leon
Party	Democratic	Republican
Popular vote	117,856	27,849
Percentage	78.7%	18.6%
- County results Menendez: 70–80% 80–90%
U.S. Representative before election
Bob Menendez
Democratic
Elected U.S. Representative
Bob Menendez
Democratic

Incumbent Democrat Bob Menendez won. This is a heavily urbanized district covering Hudson County.

=== Democratic primary ===
==== Candidates ====
- Bob Menendez, incumbent representative from Union City since 1993

===== Withdrew =====
- Esther Gatria, college student

==== Campaign ====
Esther Gatria, a college student with ties to Union City mayor and assemblyman Rudy Garcia, submitted petitions to challenge Menendez, but withdrew after Menendez urged U.S. Attorney Robert J. Cleary to investigate her petition signatures for fraud. She later took a job in Garcia's office, but he resigned under scrutiny a few weeks later.

==== Results ====
2000 Democratic primary
Party	Candidate	Votes	%
Democratic	Bob Menendez (incumbent)	37,357	100.00%
Turnout		37,357	

=== Republican primary ===
==== Candidates ====
- Theresa de Leon
- Carlos E. Munoz
- Harold Turner

==== Results ====
2000 Republican primary
Party	Candidate	Votes	%
Republican	Theresa de Leon	2,045	57.52%
Republican	Carlos E. Munoz	849	23.88%
Republican	Harold Turner	661	18.59%
Turnout		3,555	100.00%

=== General election ===
==== Candidates ====
- Theresa de Leon (Republican)
- Alina Lydia Fonteboa (In Common Effort)
- Dick Hester (Constitution)
- Claudette C. Meliere (Green)
- Bob Menendez, incumbent representative from Union City since 1993 (Democratic)
- Kari Sachs (Socialist Workers)
- Herbert Shaw, perennial candidate (Politicians are Crooks)

==== Results ====
2000 U.S. House election
Party	Candidate	Votes	%
Democratic	Bob Menendez (incumbent)	117,856	78.69%
Republican	Theresa de Leon	27,849	18.60%
Green	Claudette C. Meliere	2,741	1.83%
Constitution	Dick Hester	562	0.38%
Independent	Herbert H. Shaw	357	0.24%
Independent	Alina Lydia Fonteboa	233	0.16%
Socialist Workers	Kari Sachs	168	0.11%
Turnout		149,766	
Democratic hold			
