= 2000 United States Senate election in New Jersey =

- November 7, 2000
- Turnout: 70% (▲15pp)
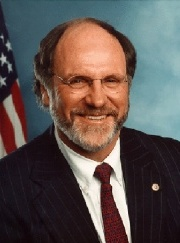

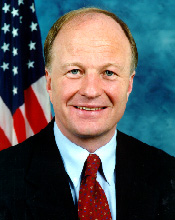
Nominee	Jon Corzine	Bob Franks
Party	Democratic	Republican
Popular vote	1,511,237	1,420,267
Percentage	50.11%	47.10%
- Corzine: 40–50% 50–60% 60–70% 70–80% 80–90% Franks: 40–50% 50–60% 60–70%
U.S. senator before election
Frank Lautenberg
Democratic
Elected U.S. Senator
Jon Corzine
Democratic

The 2000 United States Senate election in New Jersey was held on November 7, 2000. Incumbent Democratic U.S. Senator Frank Lautenberg retired rather than seeking a fourth term. Democratic nominee Jon Corzine, former CEO of Goldman Sachs, defeated the Republican U.S. Representative Bob Franks in a close election.

In prior years, this election was expected to pit the incumbent, Lautenberg, against popular Republican governor Christine Todd Whitman. Lautenberg unexpectedly announced his retirement from the Senate in February 1999, leaving the race open. Whitman announced in April that she would form a campaign committee to enter the race in earnest; however, she stunned political observers in September 1999 by announcing that she would withdraw from the race, citing fundraising concerns.

Primary elections were held on June 7. Corzine defeated former governor Jim Florio in the Democratic primary by a wide margin after a hard-fought campaign, in which Corzine spent over $35 million of his own money. Franks narrowly defeated state senator Bill Gormley to capture the Republican nomination.

In the general election, Corzine continued to spend freely to advertise his campaign and establish political support. Ultimately, he defeated Franks by approximately three percent of the total vote.

== Background ==
Incumbent U.S. senator Frank R. Lautenberg was elected in 1982 in an upset victory over U.S. representative Millicent Fenwick. In his two re-election bids, Lautenberg beat Pete Dawkins in 1988 with 54 percent of the vote and held back a challenge from New Jersey General Assembly speaker Chuck Haytaian by a smaller margin in 1994. New Jersey had not elected a Republican to the United States Senate since 1972.

For most of 1998 and 1999, speculation centered on popular Republican governor Christine Todd Whitman, who had run a surprisingly strong campaign for the state's other Senate seat in 1990. After a February 1999 poll by the Quinnipiac University Polling Institute indicated that Whitman would defeat Lautenberg by a wide margin, as would former Republican governor Thomas Kean, Lautenberg unexpectedly announced that he would retire rather than seek a fourth term in office, leaving the seat open. In her initial response to Lautenberg's announcement, Whitman told reporters that she was "seriously considering all of [her] options." Lautenberg later regretted his decision not to run and was elected to New Jersey's other Senate seat in 2002 after his former colleague, Robert Torricelli, prematurely ended his re-election campaign in disgrace.

Hypothetical polling with Lautenberg (April 1998 to January 1999)

Poll source	Date(s) administered	Sample size	Margin of error	Christine Whitman (R)	Tom Kean (R)	Frank Lautenberg (D)	Undecided
Quinnipiac	April 15–20, 1998	860 RV	±3.3%	44%	–	45%	11%
Rutgers-Eagleton	January 7–13, 1999	623 RV	±4.0%	40%	–	42%	18%
Quinnipiac	February 3–8, 1999	860 RV	±3.3%	50%	–	41%	9%
Quinnipiac	February 3–8, 1999	860 RV	±3.3%	–	46%	42%	12%

On April 8, 1999, Whitman filed a campaign committee with the Federal Election Commission in order to raise funds for a potential race. In her announcement, Whitman said, "This is not an exploratory committee. This is a campaign committee. I am obviously very serious about contemplating this run and moving forward." She emphasized that she would focus on "being governor" and refrain from campaign until 2000. Her campaign committee was chaired by prominent fundraisers Lewis Eisenberg and Candace Straight, and Whitman was also expected to rely on her large family fortune to fund her campaign.

On September 8, despite a consistently large lead in public opinion polling, Whitman stunned observers by announcing at a public news conference at the New Jersey State House that she no longer planned to run. She said that she had made the decision on a recent family vacation, after determining that the race would be "a distraction from finishing the work New Jersey voters had asked me to complete." She also cited concerns regarding "the amount of money that needs to be raised and just the time that it takes to do it." Privately, Whitman had reportedly factored in the burden of outspending Jon Corzine, who had promised to spend any amount necessary to win the race and had a personal fortune estimated at over $300 million and had already given his campaign $500,000 in direct funding. Whitman advisers were reportedly surprised by the decision, since the campaign had raised approximately $2.3 million since her committee was announced. She explicitly denied rumors that she had withdrawn due to health concerns or to be nominated for vice president as a running mate to George W. Bush. Bush publicly expressed his surprise and regret at her withdrawal. Paul von Zielbauer of The New York Times noted that despite her wide lead, Whitman had won her two campaigns for governor by narrow margins and had never been on the ballot in a presidential election year, when Democratic voters typically turned out in larger numbers. Growing scrutiny of the use of racial profiling by the New Jersey State Police may also have contributed to her decision not to run.

The Whitman announcement immediately reversed the outlook for the two major political parties. Republicans admitted that Whitman's decision left them without a clear front-runner for their nomination, while the two Democratic candidates, Corzine and Jim Florio, both predicted that the Democratic primary would determine the election.

Hypothetical polling with Whitman (March to July 1999)

Poll source	Date(s) administered	Sample size	Margin of error	Christine Whitman (R)	Jim Florio (D)	Frank Pallone (D)	Thomas Byrne (D)	Jon Corzine (D)	Bob Grant (I)	Undecided
Quinnipiac	March 23–29, 1999	984 RV	±3.1%	51%	35%	–	–	–	–	14%
Quinnipiac	March 23–29, 1999	984 RV	±3.1%	50%	–	29%	–	–	–	21%
Rutgers-Eagleton	April 28–May 6, 1999	623 RV	±4.0%	46%	39%	–	–	–	–	15%
Rutgers-Eagleton	April 28–May 6, 1999	623 RV	±4.0%	46%	–	35%	–	–	–	18%
Rutgers-Eagleton	April 28–May 6, 1999	623 RV	±4.0%	46%	–	–	34%	–	–	20%
Quinnipiac	June 2–7, 1999	1,109 RV	±2.9%	50%	38%	–	–	–	–	12%
Quinnipiac	July 13–20, 1999	1,082 RV	±3.0%	52%	35%	–	–	–	–	13%
Quinnipiac	July 13–20, 1999	1,082 RV	±3.0%	46%	32%	–	–	–	11%	11%
Quinnipiac	July 13–20, 1999	1,082 RV	±3.0%	56%	–	–	–	22%	–	22%
Quinnipiac	July 13–20, 1999	1,082 RV	±3.0%	52%	–	–	–	17%	11%	21%

== Democratic primary ==
=== Candidates ===
- Jon Corzine, former CFO and senior partner of Goldman Sachs
- James Florio, former governor of New Jersey and U.S. representative

==== Declined ====
- B. Thomas Byrne, former chair of the New Jersey Democratic State Committee and son of governor Brendan Byrne
- Hillary Rodham Clinton, First Lady of the United States (ran for U.S. Senate in New York)
- Neil M. Cohen, assemblyman from Roselle
- Frank Lautenberg, incumbent U.S. senator since 1982 (declined February 1999)
- Susan Bass Levin, mayor of Cherry Hill (ran for U.S. House)
- Bob Menendez, U.S. representative from Union City (ran for re-election)
- Bob Smith, assemblyman from Piscataway and 1992 candidate for U.S. House
- Frank Pallone, U.S. representative from Long Branch (ran for re-election)
- Steve Rothman, U.S. representative from Fair Lawn (ran for re-election)

=== Campaign ===
Following Lautenberg's announced retirement, several candidates publicly considered campaigns. The leading contender was U.S. representative Bob Menendez, who had considered campaigns for Senate in 1996 and governor in 1997 before ultimately declining to run. Menendez had recently been elected to House leadership and had raised $1.5 million in anticipation of Lautenberg's retirement, though he had stopped his fundraising efforts in 1998 in an effort to preserve party unity. However, Menendez did not enter the race.

The field ultimately narrowed to Jim Florio, the former governor who had been defeated by Whitman in 1993, and Jon Corzine, a former Goldman Sachs executive who spent freely to secure the nomination. Privately, party leaders questioned the desirability of running Florio, since they preferred to support a new face for the nomination.

Corzine spent $35 million of his fortunes into this primary election alone.

During the campaign, Corzine made a number of controversial off-color statements. Emanuel Alfano, chairman of the Italian-American One Voice Committee, claimed that when introduced to a man with an Italian name who said he was in the construction business, Corzine quipped, "Oh, you make cement shoes!" Alfano also reported that when introduced to a lawyer named David Stein, Corzine said, "He's not Italian, is he? Oh, I guess he's your Jewish lawyer who is here to get the rest of you out of jail." Corzine denied mentioning religion, but did not deny the quip about Italians, claiming that some of his own ancestors were probably Italian or maybe French.

=== Polling ===
Poll source	Date(s) administered	Sample size	Margin of error	James Florio	Jon Corzine	Undecided
Quinnipiac	July 13–20, 1999	1,082 RV	± 3.0%	55%	19%	26%
Quinnipiac	February 16–21, 2000	374 RV	± 5.1%	57%	22%	21%
Quinnipiac	March 21–27, 2000	400 RV	± 4.9%	50%	26%	24%
Quinnipiac	May 1–8, 2000	347 RV	± 5.3%	33%	48%	19%
Quinnipiac	May 17–23, 2000	371 LV	± 5.1%	30%	56%	14%

=== Endorsements ===
Corzine was endorsed by state senators Raymond Zane, Wayne Bryant, and John Adler. He was also endorsed by U.S. representative Bob Menendez and U.S. senator Robert Torricelli.

Florio was endorsed by the New Jersey Democratic Party, assemblyman Joseph Doria and state senator John A. Lynch Jr.

=== Results ===
2000 Democratic Senate primary
Party	Candidate	Votes	%
Democratic	Jon Corzine	251,216	57.96%
Democratic	James Florio	182,212	42.04%
Total votes		433,428	100.00%

== Republican primary ==
=== Candidates ===
- William Gormley, state senator from Mays Landing
- Bob Franks, U.S. representative from Summit
- Murray Sabrin, Ramapo College professor and Libertarian nominee for governor in 1997
- James Treffinger, Essex County executive and former mayor of Verona

==== Withdrew ====
- Brian T. Kennedy, former state senator from Sea Girt and perennial candidate
- Christine Todd Whitman, governor of New Jersey since 1994 (formed campaign committee April 8, 1999; withdrew September 7, 1999)

==== Declined ====
- Jack Collins, speaker of the New Jersey General Assembly
- Lewis Eisenberg, chair of the Port Authority of New York and New Jersey and chair of the Whitman campaign
- Steve Forbes, publisher of Forbes and candidate for president in 1996 (ran for president)
- Thomas Kean, former governor of New Jersey
- Frank LoBiondo, U.S. representative from Vineland (ran for re-election)
- Marge Roukema, U.S. representative from Ridgewood (ran for re-election)
- Dick Zimmer, former U.S. representative from Delaware Township and 1996 Senate nominee

=== Polling ===
Poll source	Date(s) administered	Sample size	Margin of error	Murray Sabrin	Bob Franks	James Treffinger	William Gormley	Brian Kennedy	Undecided
Quinnipiac	March 21–27, 2000	348 RV	± 5.3%	5%	14%	7%	9%	6%	59%
Quinnipiac	May 1–8, 2000	311 RV	± 5.6%	5%	18%	8%	14%	-	55%

Hypothetical polling

Poll source	Date(s) administered	Sample size	Margin of error	Steve Forbes	Murray Sabrin	Bob Franks	James Treffinger	William Gormley	Undecided
Quinnipiac	February 16–21, 2000	307 RV	± 5.6%	33%	4%	8%	5%	10%	40%

=== Results ===
2000 New Jersey U.S. Senate Republican primary election
Party	Candidate	Votes	%
Republican	Bob Franks	98,370	35.7%
Republican	William Gormley	94,010	34.1%
Republican	James W. Treffinger	48,674	17.7%
Republican	Murray Sabrin	34,629	12.6%
Total votes		275,683	100.00%

== General election ==
=== Candidates ===
- Bruce Afran (Green)
- Dennis A. Breen (Independent)
- J.M. Carter (Trust In God)
- Jon Corzine, former CFO of Goldman Sachs (Democratic)
- Pat DiNizio, lead singer of The Smithereens (Reform)
- Emerson Ellett (Libertarian)
- Bob Franks, U.S. representative from Summit (Republican)
- George Gostigian (God Bless NJ)
- Lorraine LaNeve (Conservative)
- Gregory Pason (Socialist)
- Nancy Rosenstock (Socialist Workers)

==== Declined ====
- Bob Grant, conservative talk radio host

=== Campaign ===
Franks, a moderate Republican, attacked Corzine for "trying to buy the election and of advocating big-government spending programs that the nation can ill afford." Corzine accused Franks of wanting to "dismantle" the Social Security system because he supported Governor George W. Bush's partial privatization plan.

During the campaign, Corzine refused to release his income tax return records. He claimed an interest in doing so, but he cited a confidentiality agreement with Goldman Sachs. Skeptics argued that he should have followed the example of his predecessor Robert Rubin, who converted his equity stake into debt upon leaving Goldman.

Corzine campaigned for state government programs including universal health care, universal gun registration, mandatory public preschool, and more taxpayer funding for college education. He pushed affirmative action and same-sex marriage. David Brooks considered Corzine so liberal that although his predecessor was also a Democrat, his election helped shift the Senate to the left.

Corzine was accused of exchanging donations to black ministers for their endorsements after a foundation controlled by him and his wife donated $25,000 to an influential black church. Rev. Reginald T. Jackson, the director of the Black Ministers Council, and a notable advocate against racial profiling against minority drivers in traffic stops, was criticized for endorsing Corzine after receiving a large donation from the then candidate.

Franks generally trailed Corzine in the polls until the final week, when he pulled even in a few polls. Corzine spent $63 million, while Franks spent only $6 million.

=== Debates ===
- Complete video of debate, October 7, 2000
- Complete video of debate, October 8, 2000
- Complete video of debate, October 13, 2000
- Complete video of debate, October 20, 2000

=== Polling ===
Poll source	Date(s)	Sample size	Margin of error	Jon Corzine (D)	Bob Franks (R)	Other / undecided (Note: Calculated by taking the difference of 100% and all other candidates combined.)
Rutgers-Eagleton Institute of Politics	September 15–21, 1999	560 LV	±4.0%	24%	30%	47%
Rutgers-Eagleton Institute of Politics	February 28–March 9, 2000	626 LV	±4.0%	24%	25%	51%
Rutgers-Eagleton Institute of Politics	June 8–13, 2000	579 RV	±4.0%	43%	33%	23%
Rutgers-Eagleton Institute of Politics	June 8–13, 2000	442 LV	±5.0%	43%	36%	20%
Quinnipiac University Polling Institute	June 20–26, 2000	1,004 RV	± 3.1%	46%	26%	28%
Quinnipiac University Polling Institute	July 19–24, 2000	910 RV	± 3.3%	50%	30%	20%
Quinnipiac University Polling Institute	August 18–22, 2000	802 RV	± 3.5%	43%	35%	22%
Rutgers-Eagleton Institute of Politics	September 6–13, 2000	670 RV	±4.0%	47%	32%	21%
Rutgers-Eagleton Institute of Politics	September 6–13, 2000	542 LV	±4.5%	45%	36%	19%
Quinnipiac University Polling Institute	September 26–Oct. 1, 2000	820 LV	± 3.4%	48%	34%	18%
Quinnipiac University Polling Institute	September 26–Oct. 1, 2000	1,045 RV	± 3.0%	44%	30%	20%
Rutgers-Eagleton Institute of Politics	October 12–15, 2000	482 RV	±4.5%	45%	33%	22%
Rutgers-Eagleton Institute of Politics	October 12–15, 2000	367 LV	±5.5%	45%	37%	18%
Quinnipiac University Polling Institute	October 18–23, 2000	909 LV	± 3.3%	46%	41%	13%
Rutgers-Eagleton Institute of Politics	October 23–26, 2000	432 LV	±4.5%	49%	39%	12%
SurveyUSA	October 25, 2000	500	—	50%	42%	8%
Monmouth University	October 27, 2000	575	—	39%	35%	26%
Quinnipiac University Polling Institute	October 24–30, 2000	793 LV	± 3.5%	47%	39%	14%
Rasmussen Reports	October 30, 2000	594	—	46%	42%	12%
Tarrance Group (R) (Note: Poll conducted for Bob Franks.)	November 1, 2000	500	—	40%	44%	16%
Harris Insights & Analytics	November 3, 2000	7,193	—	49%	45%	6%
Monmouth University	November 3, 2000	843	—	41%	36%	23%
Quinnipiac University Polling Institute	November 1–5, 2000	770 LV	± 3.4%	43%	45%	12%
Rasmussen Reports	November 5, 2000	637	—	43%	44%	13%

Hypothetical polling

Poll source	Date(s) administered	Sample size	Margin of error	Bob Franks (R)	Bill Gormley (R)	Jim Treffinger (R)	Jim Florio (D)	Frank Pallone (D)	Thomas Byrne (D)	Jon Corinze (D)	Undecided
Rutgers-Eagleton	September 15–21, 1999	560 RV	±4.0%	31%	–	–	–	–	29%	–	41%
Rutgers-Eagleton	September 15–21, 1999	560 RV	±4.0%	–	31%	–	–	–	–	24%	45%
Rutgers-Eagleton	September 15–21, 1999	560 RV	±4.0%	34%	–	–	41%	–	–	–	26%
Rutgers-Eagleton	September 15–21, 1999	560 RV	±4.0%	–	33%	–	41%	–	–	–	18%
Rutgers-Eagleton	September 15–21, 1999	560 RV	±4.0%	–	–	33%	41%	–	–	–	18%
Rutgers-Eagleton	February 28–March 9, 2000	626 RV	±4.0%	–	27%	–	–	–	–	23%	50%
Rutgers-Eagleton	February 28–March 9, 2000	626 RV	±4.0%	–	21%	–	–	–	–	24%	55%
Rutgers-Eagleton	February 28–March 9, 2000	626 RV	±4.0%	33%	–	–	36%	–	–	–	31%
Rutgers-Eagleton	February 28–March 9, 2000	626 RV	±4.0%	–	32%	–	37%	–	–	–	31%
Rutgers-Eagleton	February 28–March 9, 2000	626 RV	±4.0%	–	–	31%	36%	–	–	–	33%

=== Results ===
Despite being heavily outspent, Franks lost by only three percentage points, doing better that year than Republican Governor George W. Bush in the presidential election, who obtained just 40.29% of the vote in the state.

General election results
Party	Candidate	Votes	%	±%
Democratic	Jon Corzine	1,511,237	50.11%	▼0.18
Republican	Bob Franks	1,420,267	47.10%	▲0.08
Green	Bruce Afran	32,841	1.09%	N/A
Reform	Pat DiNizio	19,312	0.64%	N/A
Libertarian	Emerson Ellett	7,241	0.24%	+.44%
Independent	Dennis A. Breen	6,061	0.20%	N/A
Trust in God	J.M. Carter	5,657	0.19%	N/A
Conservative	Lorraine LaNeve	3,836	0.13%	N/A
Socialist	Gregory Pason	3,365	0.11%	▼0.35
Socialist Workers	Nancy Rosenstock	3,309	0.11%	▼0.07
God Bless Jersey	George Gostigian	2,536	0.08%	N/A
Majority		90,970	3.01%	−.26%
Total votes		3,015,662	100.0%	N/A
Democratic hold				

==== By county ====

County	Jon Corzine December		Bob Franks Republican		Various candidates Other parties		Margin		Total votes cast
County	#	%	#	%	#	%	#	%	Total votes cast
Atlantic	42,146	50.37%	39,738	47.49%	1,791	2.14%	2,408	2.88%	83,675
Bergen	171,017	48.64%	174,949	49.75%	5,658	1.61%	-3,932	-1.11%	351,624
Burlington	80,119	48.59%	83,840	50.85%	929	0.56%	-3,721	-2.26%	164,888
Camden	103,179	56.65%	74,620	40.97%	4,338	2.38%	28,559	15.68%	182,137
Cape May	16,781	37.84%	26,665	60.12%	906	2.04%	-9,884	-22.28%	44,352
Cumberland	21,581	50.26%	19,698	45.88%	1,657	3.86%	1,883	4.38%	42,936
Essex	170,756	68.36%	73,757	29.53%	5,263	2.11%	96,999	38.83%	249,776
Gloucester	49,802	48.08%	49,660	47.95%	4,115	3.97%	142	0.13%	103,577
Hudson	112,502	70.15%	43,820	27.32%	4,062	2.53%	68,682	42.83%	160,384
Hunterdon	17,796	32.74%	34,468	63.41%	2,091	3.85%	-16,672	-30.67%	54,355
Mercer	72,250	56.00%	53,542	41.50%	3,236	2.50%	18,708	14.50%	129,028
Middlesex	132,476	54.06%	104,652	42.71%	7,918	3.23%	27,824	11.35%	245,046
Monmouth	109,282	45.09%	123,447	50.94%	9,624	3.97%	-14,165	-5.85%	242,353
Morris	69,889	36.03%	118,283	60.97%	5,817	3.00%	-48,394	-24.94%	193,989
Ocean	82,596	40.23%	115,686	56.35%	7,013	3.42%	-33,090	-16.12%	205,295
Passaic	75,378	52.53%	63,460	44.23%	4,646	3.24%	11,918	8.30%	143,484
Salem	11,566	43.54%	13,900	52.32%	1,101	4.14%	-2,334	-8.78%	26,567
Somerset	45,948	39.00%	69,045	58.61%	2,811	2.39%	-23,097	-19.61%	117,804
Sussex	18,453	32.44%	35,740	62.83%	2,694	4.74%	-17,287	-30.39%	56,887
Union	93,879	53.67%	77,111	44.08%	3,939	2.25%	16,768	9.59%	174,929
Warren	13,841	34.64%	24,186	60.53%	1,932	4.83%	-10,345	-25.89%	39,959
Totals	1,511,237	50.11%	1,420,267	47.10%	84,158	3.01%	90,970	2.79%	3,015,662

Counties that flipped from Democratic to Republican

- Bergen (largest municipality: Hackensack)
- Burlington (largest municipality: Evesham Township)

== See also ==
- 2000 United States Senate elections
