= Paul von Zielbauer =

American journalist

Paul von Zielbauer is a journalist, writer, and social entrepreneur and public speaker. In 2008, he founded Roadmonkey Adventure Philanthropy, a for-profit social venture that combines challenging outdoor adventures with sustainable, hands-on volunteer projects for impoverished communities in Vietnam, Tanzania, Peru, Nicaragua and Argentina. From January 1999 to September 2009, Zielbauer was a staff reporter for The New York Times, reporting on the Iraq war and the U.S. military in 2006 and 2007.

== Career ==
Zielbauer began his journalism career in 1992 at the City News Bureau of Chicago, covering homicides, fires and, on the overnight shift, the Chicago Police Department. He left the wire service in late 1993 to embark on a 4-month, 1200-mile solo cycling trek from Hanoi to Ho Chi Minh City, Vietnam, where he wrote a front-page article for Crain's Chicago Business about American businesses in Vietnam preparing for the end of the U.S. economic embargo.

From 2000 to 2003, Zielbauer was The Times' Connecticut bureau chief.

At The New York Times, Zielbauer worked primarily for the Metro desk, where he covered the New York City jail system and reported on the intersection or organized labor and organized crime. During periods in 2006 and 2007, he covered the war in Iraq and the aftermath of the September 2007 killings of civilians in Baghdad's Nisour Square by Blackwater military contractors. In 2007, Zielbauer became The Times' beat reporter on the military justice system, covering high-profile military prosecutions of alleged war crimes in Iraq and Afghanistan.

Zielbauer founded Roadmonkey and coined the phrase "adventure philanthropy" in 2008, while still a reporter at The New York Times. Roadmonkey has been called "a new kind of travel" because of its intent to blend off-the-path adventure with hands-on volunteer projects that benefit people and communities in need. O: The Oprah Magazine, writing about Zielbauer, called him "a guy we like" because it said Roadmonkey seeks to "combine physically challenging expeditions with humanitarian efforts."

=== Media and public appearances ===
Zielbauer has appeared on CNN and National Public Radio to discuss his New York Times reporting. He and Roadmonkey Adventure Philanthropy have been featured by publications including CNN, O: The Oprah Magazine, Outside magazine, ABC News, and The Wall Street Journal.

== Education and awards ==
For his 2005 investigative series on Prison Health Services Inc., Zielbauer won the New York State Associated Press award for Depth Reporting and World Hunger Year's annual Harry Chapin Award for reporting on poverty-related issues.
