= Maryanne Connelly =

American politician (born 1945)

Mayor of Fanwood, New Jersey
- In office 1995–1999
- Preceded by: Linda Stender

Personal details
- Born: October 6, 1945 (age 81) Brooklyn, New York City
- Party: Democratic
- Education: Saint Elizabeth University (B.S.)

Maryanne Connelly (born October 6, 1945) is an American politician who was Mayor of Fanwood, New Jersey from 1995 to 1999. A member of the Democratic Party, she has also twice unsuccessfully sought a seat in the U.S. House of Representatives. Her candidacy became one of the most publicized competitive races in the United States House of Representatives elections in 2000.

== Biography ==
She was born on October 6, 1945, in Brooklyn, New York City, and raised in Maplewood, New Jersey. She attended high school in Elizabeth, New Jersey, and after her graduation, she attended the Saint Elizabeth University where she received a B.S. in nutrition in 1967. She then did a one-year internship at NewYork–Presbyterian Hospital to become a licensed dietitian. She then stayed on at the hospital for an additional year. She married and was widowed.

She served on the town environmental commission, and on the Fanwood Planning Board from 1984 to 1986. Maryanne won a position on the Fanwood Council in 1985, where she served for 9 consecutive years. Connelly was first elected as police commissioner of Fanwood, New Jersey, in 1986. She then served a second term on the Fanwood Planning Board from 1996 to 1999. Connelly served as a councilwoman in Fanwood before her 1995 election as mayor.

In the United States House of Representatives elections, 1998, she challenged Congressman Bob Franks in his bid for a fourth term, running as a pro-choice Democrat. She was endorsed by The New York Times, which wrote "Ms. Connelly, the Mayor of Fanwood and a retired AT&T executive, is firmer in her support for civil liberties and abortion rights." She received 44% of the vote in her challenge to Franks.

In 1999 she did not seek a second term as mayor, saying that she was focusing on her 2000 bid for Congress.

Democratic Party leaders originally backed Connelly in her 2000 Congressional bid, until in September 1999, when Franks announced his candidacy for New Jersey's vacant U.S. Senate seat. Franks became a Senate candidate after Gov. Christine Todd Whitman announced she would not seek the Senate seat. Democratic Party leaders, no longer considering Franks' seat to be unwinnable, decided to support Union County Manager Michael Lapolla for Congress instead of Connelly. Following this decision, Connelly did not bow out of the Congressional race as party leaders suggested. The primary drew national attention when the Lapolla campaign ran a parody ad of game show "Who Wants to be a Millionaire?" in which Connelly, played by an actress who spoke in a "ditzy", was portrayed as "an indecisive airhead" who, when asked a question, replied, "Ooh, that's hard." The ad drew national attention as an example of attacking female candidates by using derogatory anti-woman, stereotypes.

She continued her campaign and defeated Lapolla in the primary. The New York Times endorsed her candidacy writing "Ms. Connelly has a solid record of public service in Fanwood, and she would be a steady voice against Social Security privatization and the anti-abortion forces in Congress that her opponent would join."

In the United States House of Representatives elections, 2000, Connelly faced Republican Mike Ferguson, who had defeated Tom Kean Jr., Assemblyman Joel Weingarten, and Patrick Morrissey in the Republican Party primary. It became one of the top three races in the election cycle. Richard Gephardt of Missouri, Patrick J. Kennedy and Joseph Lieberman endorsed her and campaigned with her. she ran attack ads against Ferguson. Her campaign was marred when The Star-Ledger – a newspaper that endorsed Connelly in its ex cathedra campaign editorial – ran an opinion piece that denounced her attacks on Ferguson. The commentary said she was a contender to being "New Jersey's sleaziest candidate." The Ferguson campaign attacked Connolly by calling her the mayor of "Taxwood" in campaign ads. The race was among the handful selected by the National Republican Committee to receive national Party support. Connelly attempted to make an issue out of an illegal loan Ferguson's campaign received from his parents in 2000, but the issue failed to gain "traction" with voters; after review by the Federal Election Commission and adjudication, Ferguson paid a large civil fine using money from his campaign fund. Democratic State Committee Chairman Thomas Giblin asserted it was the illegal loan that enabled Ferguson to win.

Ferguson defeated Connelly; she received 48% of the vote.

Connelly was recognized by the National Organization for Women with a NOW Woman of Courage Award for the race in 2001 for her "uphill struggle to have a woman taken seriously as a legitimate candidate in a highly contested race".

Preceded by Linda Stender	Mayor of Fanwood, New Jersey; 1996 – 2000	Succeeded by Louis Jung
