= Michael Ferguson (New Jersey politician) =

American politician (born 1970)

Mike Ferguson
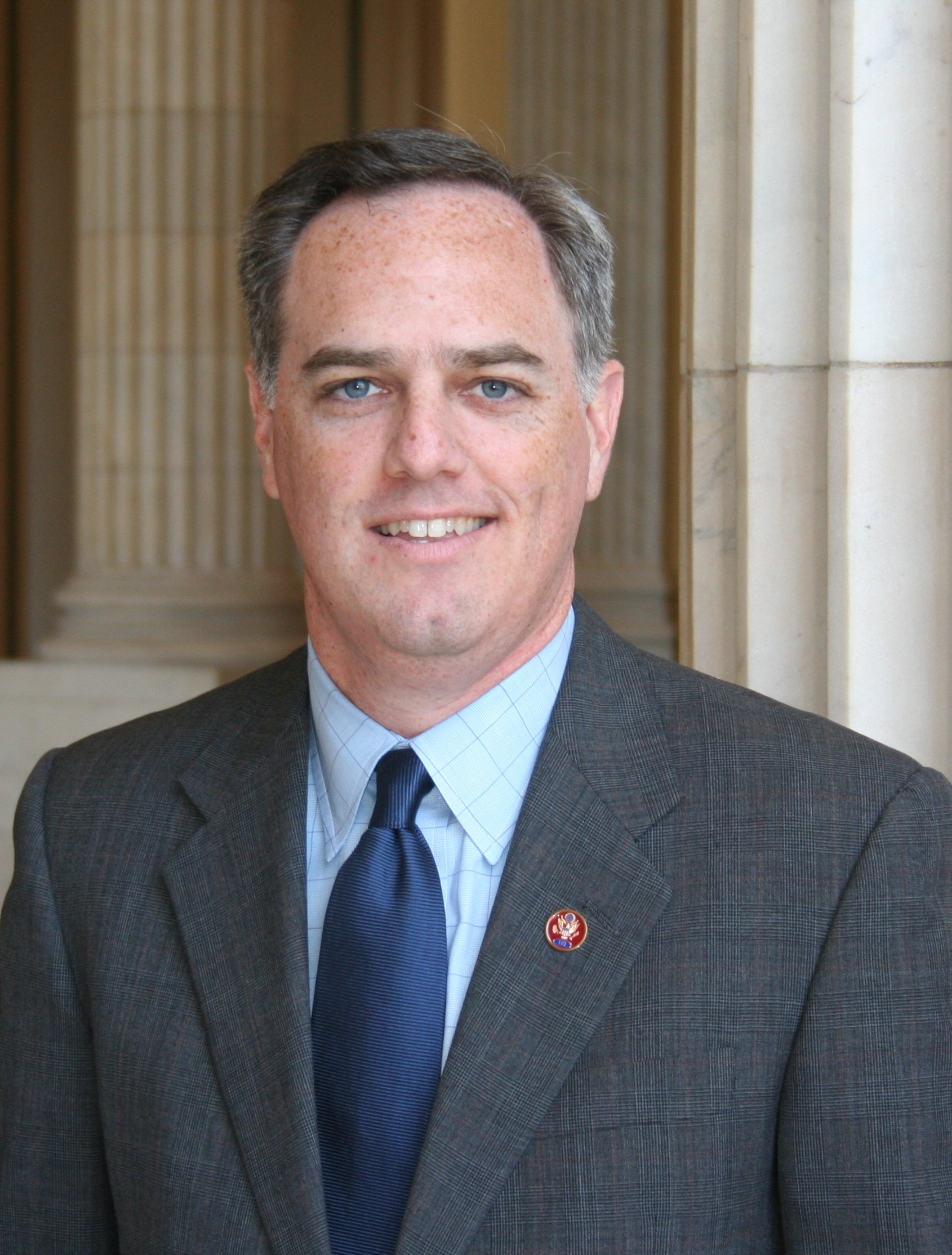

Member of the U.S. House of Representatives from New Jersey's 7th district
- In office January 3, 2001 – January 3, 2009
- Preceded by: Bob Franks
- Succeeded by: Leonard Lance

Personal details
- Born: Michael A. Ferguson; July 22, 1970 (age 56) Ridgewood, New Jersey, U.S.
- Party: Republican
- Spouse: Maureen Ferguson
- Education: University of Notre Dame (BA); Georgetown University (MPA)

Michael A. Ferguson (born July 22, 1970) is an American Republican Party politician who served as member of the United States House of Representatives representing New Jersey's 7th congressional district from 2001 to 2009. Ferguson is now executive vice president at AT&T and leader of the company's federal legislative relations team.

== Life and early career ==
Ferguson was born in Ridgewood, New Jersey. Ferguson is the son of Thomas Ferguson, former chairman and CEO of CommonHealth USA, a healthcare marketing and communications group. He attended the Delbarton School, the University of Notre Dame, and has an MPA from the Georgetown University. He attended the University of Notre Dame with punk musician Ted Leo, where it is claimed that he adhered to more left-leaning politics, voiced in the song "The Anointed One" off the album Hearts of Oak.

Before running for Congress he worked as a teacher at a private school, and worked as a part-time as an instructor at a community college.

== Congressional career ==
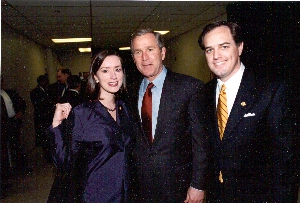
Ferguson and his wife with President George W. Bush in 2001

Ferguson was the Republican nominee for 6th Congressional District in 1998, but lost to Democratic incumbent Frank Pallone. In 1999, Ferguson moved to the more Republican 7th district, where incumbent Bob Franks was retiring to run for the United States Senate. Ferguson defeated Thomas Kean Jr. and future Governor of West Virginia Patrick Morrisey in the primary. He faced a difficult general election campaign against the Democratic candidate, former Fanwood mayor Maryanne Connelly but narrowly won, receiving 50% of the vote. At 30 years old, Ferguson was the youngest member of the New Jersey Congressional delegation.

Ferguson initially was a Member of the House Financial Services Committee, the Transportation and Infrastructure Committee, and the Small Business Committee. Early in his career he played an active role in committee hearings on corporate accounting scandals at Enron and Worldcom, and cosponsored the Sarbanes-Oxley Act of 2002. He also served on the House–Senate conference committee which produced the first terrorism risk insurance law in the wake of the September 11, 2001 attacks.

In his second term, Ferguson joined the House Energy and Commerce Committee, where he served as Vice Chairman of the Health Subcommittee, and also served on the Telecommunications and Internet Subcommittee and the Oversight and Investigations Subcommittee. During his time on the Energy and Commerce Committee, Ferguson became a key Republican Member on health care issues broadly and a champion for the life sciences industry which employed large numbers of his constituents. This included working with his colleagues to ensure passage of the Medicare Part D prescription drug benefit.

In 2002 and 2004, Ferguson defeated challenges from Democrats Tim Carden and Steve Brozak by comparatively large margins.

In 2005, citing his family's own experience in providing care to his mother as she fought cancer, Ferguson sponsored the Lifespan Respite Care Act, which authorized $289 million in grants to states to train volunteers and provide respite care services to sick and elderly family members or children with special needs. President George W. Bush signed Ferguson's legislation into law December 21, 2006.

In 2006, Ferguson won reelection in a tight race with Democratic state legislator Linda Stender. Stender attempted to portray him as too conservative for the district and tie him with President Bush, who was extremely unpopular at the time in New Jersey. The 7th district had a slight Republican lean, and Stender won the more liberal suburban counties of Middlesex and Union. Ferguson managed to win reelection by winning large margins in the more conservative areas in Somerset and Hunterdon counties, and holding Stender to only a small lead in Union. Overall, he defeated Stender by just over 3,000 votes and a margin of less than 2 percentage points.

=== Retirement ===
Ferguson announced on November 19, 2007, that he would not run for re-election in 2008, stating that he wanted to spend more time with his family. He was succeeded by fellow Republican Leonard Lance, a state senator. Ferguson and his wife Maureen have five children.

=== Awards ===
Ferguson was the recipient of the 2005 Outstanding Legislator of the Year award from the New Jersey Veterans of Foreign Wars, the 2006 Legislator of the Year Award from the National Visiting Nurses Association, and the 2007 Congressional Award from the Leukemia & Lymphoma Society.

=== Voting record ===
Overall, Ferguson's voting record was moderate by national Republican standards, as is typical of Republicans from New Jersey. He was known as a social conservative and staunch advocate for anti-abortion causes, obtaining a 100% rating by the National Right to Life Committee.

== Post-congressional career ==
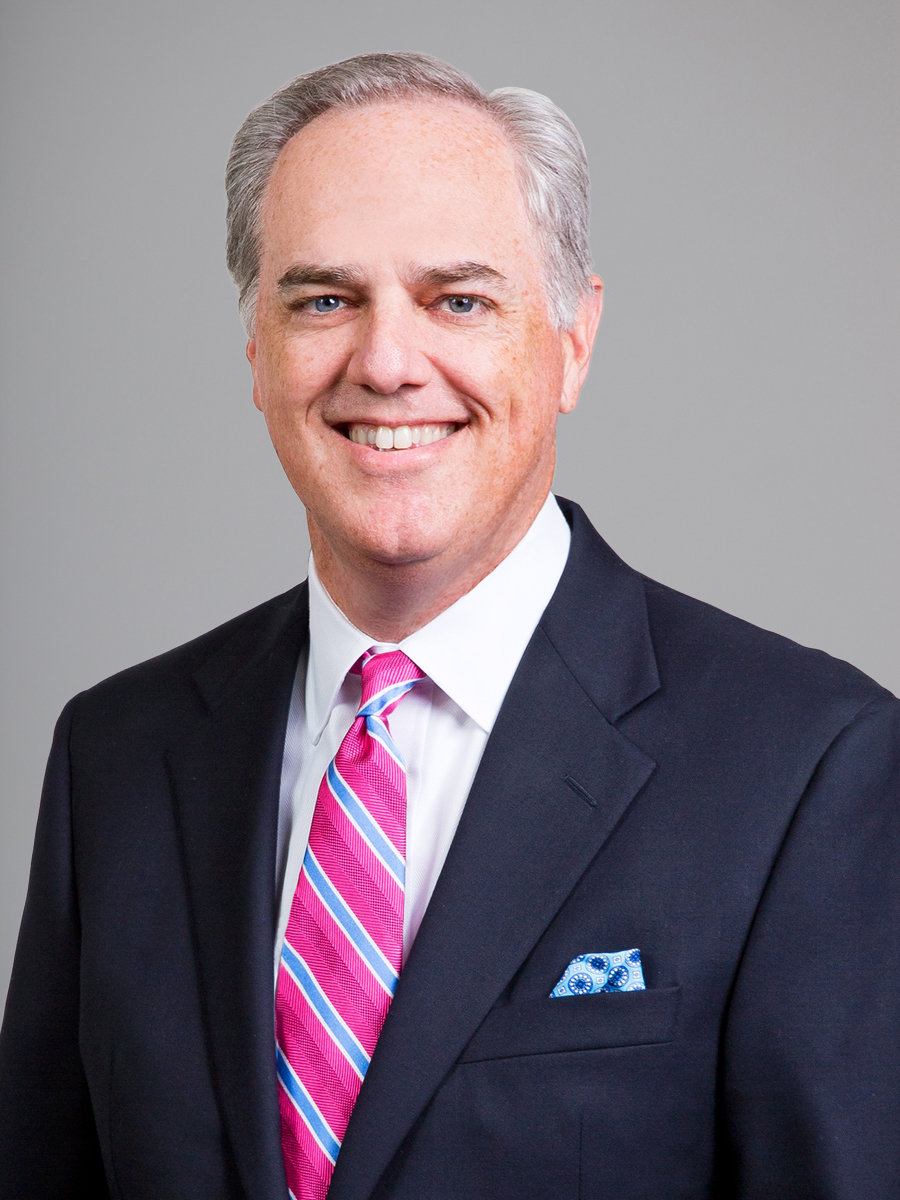
Ferguson in 2018

Upon his retirement from Congress effective January 3, 2009, Ferguson became chairman and CEO of Ferguson Strategies LLC, a government affairs and strategic business consulting firm based in Washington, D.C. The firm provided services to Fortune 100 companies as well as start-ups, with an emphasis on health care and life sciences as well as financial services and energy.

Ferguson co-chaired New Jersey Governor Chris Christie's victorious 2009 campaign, and after the election served as Chairman of the Treasury Subcommittee for Christie's transition team. Christie later nominated Ferguson to be a board member of the New Jersey Sports and Exposition Authority; Ferguson's nomination was approved March 10, 2011, by the Democratic-controlled New Jersey Senate Judiciary Committee and March 21, 2011, by the full Senate.

Ferguson is also a senior fellow at the non-profit Center for Medicine in the Public Interest.

In 2016, Ferguson joined the law firm BakerHostetler as a senior advisor and leader of the firm's Federal Policy team.

In 2022, Ferguson joined AT&T as executive vice president of federal legislative relations, where he is responsible for managing the team that represents AT&T before Congress, the White House, and executive branch departments.

== Electoral history ==
New Jersey's 7th congressional district: Results 2000–2006
Year	Democrat	Votes	Pct	Republican	Votes	Pct	3rd Party	Party	Votes	Pct	3rd Party	Party	Votes	Pct	
2000	Maryanne Connelly	113,479	46%	Mike Ferguson	128,434	52%	Jerry L. Coleman	Independent	5,444	2%	Darren Young	Independent	973	<1%	*
2002	Tim Carden	74,879	41%	Mike Ferguson	106,055	58%	Darren Young	Libertarian	2,068	1%					
2004	Steve Brozak	119,081	42%	Mike Ferguson	162,597	57%	Thomas Abrams	Libertarian	2,153	1%	Matthew Williams	Independent	2,016	1%	
2006	Linda Stender	95,454	48%	Mike Ferguson	98,399	49%	Thomas Abrams	Withdraw Troops Now	3,176	2%	Darren Young	Libertarian	2,046	1%	

*Write-in and minor candidate notes: In 2000, Shawn Gianella received 386 votes and Mary T. Johnson received 283 votes.

U.S. House of Representatives
Preceded by Bob Franks	Member of the U.S. House of Representatives from New Jersey's 7th congressional district 2001–2009	Succeeded by Leonard Lance
U.S. order of precedence (ceremonial)
Preceded by Tom Marino as Former U.S. Representative	Order of precedence of the United States as Former U.S. Representative	Succeeded by Bob Barr as Former U.S. Representative
