= Mike Pappas =

American politician

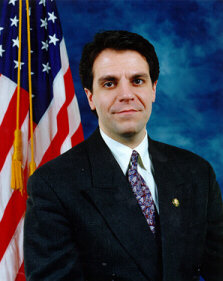

Member of the U.S. House of Representatives from New Jersey's 12th district
- In office January 3, 1997 – January 3, 1999
- Preceded by: Dick Zimmer
- Succeeded by: Rush Holt

Personal details
- Born: Michael James Pappas; December 29, 1960 (age 65) New Brunswick, New Jersey, U.S.
- Party: Republican
- Education: Seton Hall University (BA)
- Pappas's voice Pappas's congressional website introduction.

Michael James Pappas (born December 29, 1960) is an American politician and former one term Republican congressman from New Jersey, serving from 1997 to 1999. He is currently the Township Administrator in Bridgewater, New Jersey. He was an unsuccessful candidate for State Senator in New Jersey's 16th legislative district in the 2021 and 2023 elections.

== Early life and education ==
Pappas, a Greek American, was born in 1960 in New Brunswick, New Jersey. He is a graduate of Alma Preparatory School in Zarephath, New Jersey, and attended Seton Hall University.

== Political career ==
He got into politics in the early 1980s, becoming a member of the Franklin Township township council where he served from 1982 to 1987, including two years as mayor. He later would be elected to the Board of Chosen Freeholders for Somerset County, and served from 1984 to 1996, alongside future Governor Christine Todd Whitman, who was also a Freeholder during portions of that time.

=== Congress ===
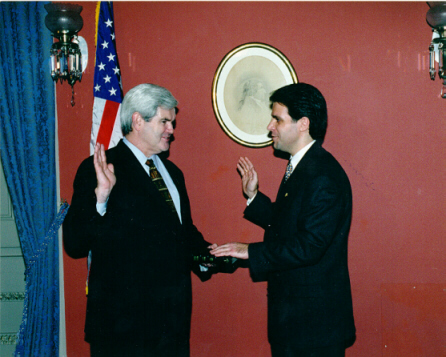
Speaker of the House Newt Gingrich swears in Pappas in 1997 during the ceremonial swearing in

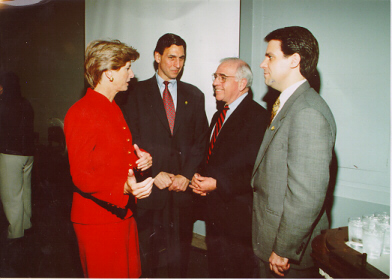
Pappas meets with Governor of New Jersey Christine Todd Whitman and fellow New Jersey Republican Representatives Frank LoBiondo (2nd district) and Jim Saxton (3rd district) in 1997.

In 1996, Pappas ran for the House of Representatives in New Jersey's 12th congressional district. The incumbent, Republican Dick Zimmer, gave up his seat to run for the U.S. Senate that year. Pappas won the Republican primary, defeating State Senator John O. Bennett and Assemblyman (and future 7th district Representative) Leonard Lance. He then won the general election against Lambertville Mayor David DelVecchio.

Unlike most New Jersey Republicans, Pappas was a staunch conservative. His congressional service included pushing for a stronger national defense, the elimination of the capital gains tax, advocacy for small business, securing the release of the battleship USS New Jersey to the state of New Jersey as a museum, and resurrecting the controversial "Star Wars" national missile defense.

He was a strong supporter of the impeachment of Bill Clinton, and his infamous singing of "Twinkle, Twinkle, Kenneth Starr" on the House floor contributed to his defeat by Rush Holt in 1998.

In 2000, Pappas unsuccessfully sought the Republican nomination for his old congressional seat, losing a highly contentious primary to the more moderate Zimmer by 62 to 38% margin. Holt narrowly defeated Zimmer in the general election to retain his seat.

== Later career ==
During the George W. Bush administration, Pappas worked for the Small Business Administration in Washington, D.C. He moved back to New Jersey in 2009 after Bush's presidency ended.

In June 2016, Pappas was hired as the Borough Administrator of High Bridge, New Jersey. In December 2019, Pappas was named by Bridgewater Mayor-elect Matt Moench to be the municipality's next Township Administrator.

=== State Senate campaign ===
In 2021, Pappas announced that he would be running for the Republican nomination for State Senate in New Jersey's 16th legislative district. The incumbent, Christopher "Kip" Bateman, a moderate Republican who barely won re-election in 2017, decided to retire. The 16th district had previously been a safe Republican district, but after re-districting in 2011, it became a swing district after the removal of Bridgewater and the addition of Princeton. Both of its Assembly seats flipped from red to blue during the 2010s decade. In the early stages of the race, he again competed against Zimmer, who, like Pappas, was also making his first run for political office in over a decade. After Pappas won the organization line for Somerset County, a large part of the 16th district, Zimmer dropped out of the race. Pappas won the Republican primary in June 2021. He lost the general election to Democrat Andrew Zwicker, the district's state assemblyman in November 2021.

== Electoral history ==
12th District Republican House Primary, 1996
| Party | Candidate | Votes | % |
|---|---|---|---|
| Republican | Mike Pappas | 11,069 | 38.1 |
| Republican | John Bennett | 9,894 | 34.0 |
| Republican | Leonard Lance | 7,630 | 26.2 |
| Republican | Luis De Agustin | 481 | 1.7 |
| Total votes | | 29,074 | 100.0 |

12th District House general election, 1996
| Party | Candidate | Votes | % |
|---|---|---|---|
| Republican | Mike Pappas | 135,811 | 50.4 |
| Democratic | David M. Del Vecchio | 125,594 | 46.7 |
| Independent | Virginia A. Flynn | 3,955 | 1.5 |
| Independent | Joseph M. Mercurio | 2,650 | 1.0 |
| Independent | Philip G. Cenicola | 1,211 | 0.4 |
| Total votes | | 269,221 | 100.0 |

12th District House general election, 1998
| Party | Candidate | Votes | % |
|---|---|---|---|
| Democratic | Rush Holt | 92,528 | 50.1 |
| Republican | Mike Pappas | 87,221 | 47.2 |
| Libertarian | Joseph A. Siano | 2,125 | 1.2 |
| Green | Madelyn R. Hoffman | 1,409 | 0.8 |
| Reform | Beverly Kidder | 749 | 0.4 |
| Natural Law | Mary Jo Christian | 578 | 0.3 |
| Total votes | | 184,610 | 100.0 |

12th District Republican House Primary, 2000
| Party | Candidate | Votes | % |
|---|---|---|---|
| Republican | Dick Zimmer | 19,084 | 62.0 |
| Republican | Mike Pappas | 11,692 | 38.0 |
| Total votes | | 30,776 | 100.0 |

16th District State Senate Republican Primary, 2021
| Party | Candidate | Votes | % |
|---|---|---|---|
| Republican | Mike Pappas | 7,146 | 64.5 |
| Republican | Jeffrey Grant | 3,934 | 35.5 |
| Total votes | | 11,080 | 100.0 |

16th District State Senate General Election, 2021
| Party | Candidate | Votes | % |
|---|---|---|---|
| Democratic | Andrew Zwicker | 41,837 | 53.32 |
| Republican | Mike Pappas | 36,632 | 46.68 |
| Total votes | | 78,469 | 100.0 |

16th Legislative District General Election, 2023
| Party | Candidate | Votes | % |
|---|---|---|---|
| Democratic | Andrew Zwicker (incumbent) | 34,693 | 56.5 |
| Republican | Mike Pappas | 25,839 | 42.0 |
| Libertarian | Richard J. Byrne | 922 | 1.5 |
| Total votes | | 61,454 | 100.0 |

U.S. House of Representatives
| Preceded by Dick Zimmer | Member of the U.S. House of Representatives from New Jersey's 12th congressional district 1997–1999 | Succeeded by Rush Holt |
U.S. order of precedence (ceremonial)
| Preceded by William J. Martini as Former U.S. Representative | Order of precedence of the United States as Former U.S. Representative | Succeeded by Don Johnson Jr. as Former U.S. Representative |
