= Bogert House =

Bogert House may refer to:

- Bogert House (Bogota, New Jersey), listed on the National Register of Historic Places (NRHP)
- Bogert House (Demarest, New Jersey), NRHP-listed
- Isaac Bogert House, Mahwah, New Jersey, NRHP-listed in Bergen County
- John Jacob Bogert House, Harrington Park, New Jersey, NRHP-listed
