= Ghostly Kisses =

Singer

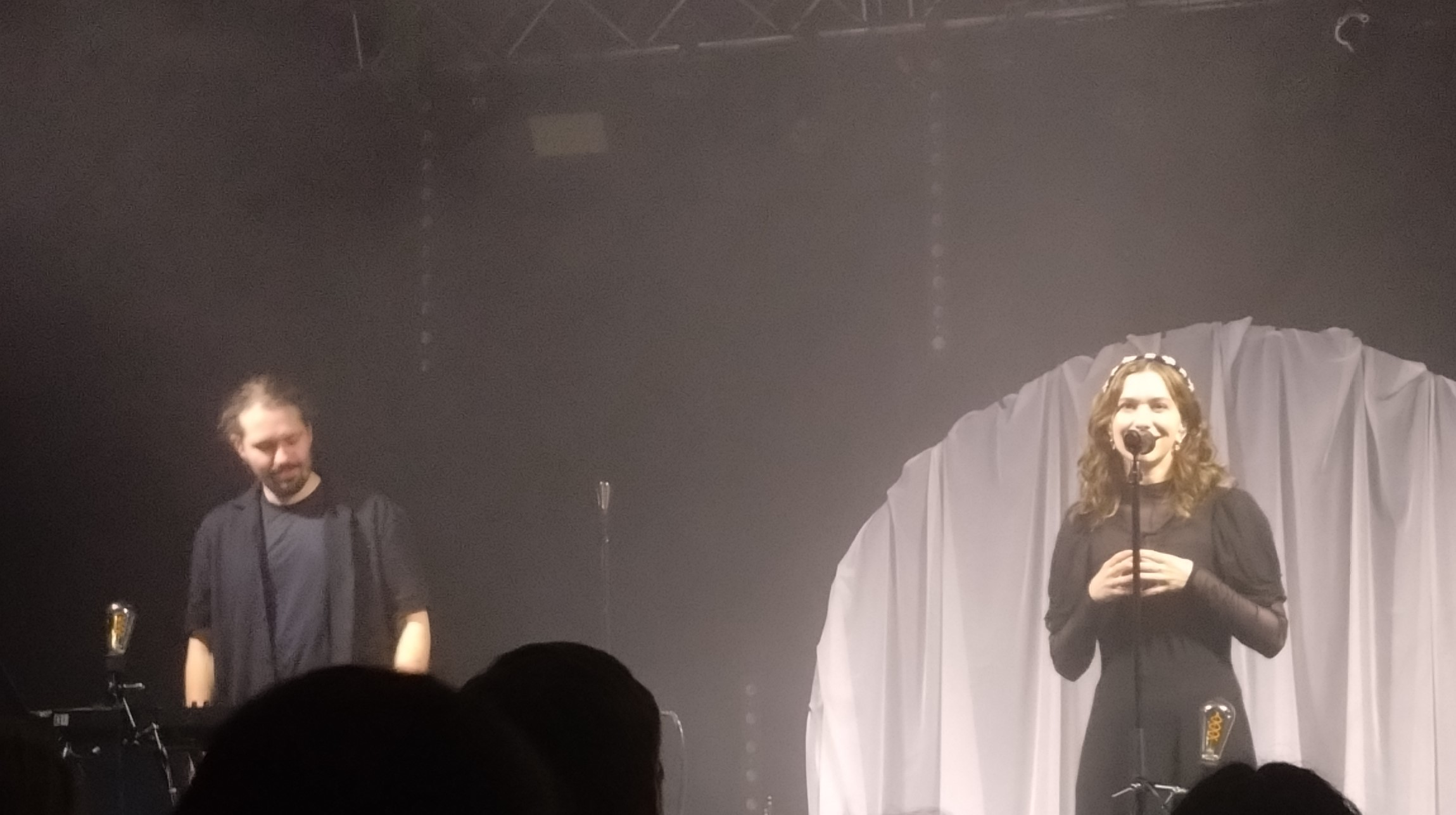
Canadian duo Ghostly Kisses – Margaux Sauvé, vocals, Louis-Étienne Santais, keyboard/synth – during a Spring 2024 European tour, Prague, Czechia.

Ghostly Kisses is the musical project of French-Canadian singers Margaux Sauvé and Louis-Étienne Santais. They are based in Quebec. Sauvé is signed to the British record label Akira Records. The name 'Ghostly Kisses' was inspired by the William Faulkner poem Une ballade des dames perdues, which includes the verse "And brush my lips with little ghostly kisses." Clash describes her music as having "a weightless quality, something that transcends the ephemeral to grapple with key facets of our lives."

== Career ==
Sauvé was in university studying psychology when she had a burst of creativity to start composing songs. She was a trained violinist but had never considered she could be a singer before. At the end of her studies, she showed her songs to Dragos Chiriac (Men I Trust) who praised Sauvé's voice and suggested they work together. She released her first single, "Never Know", in May 2015. Her debut EP, What You See, was released in March 2017. Her sophomore EP, This City Holds My Heart, was released in 2018. The EP included a cover of The Cranberries' song "Zombie".

In 2019 she was officially chosen to showcase at the SXSW music festival in Austin. She also released another EP that year, Alone Together. The EP was a collection of acoustic songs.

2020 saw the release of another EP, Never Let Me Go.

The announcement of her debut full-length album, Heaven, Wait, came in 2021, when she released its title track in September 2021. She composed the songs for her debut album with her musical and life partner Louis-Étienne Santais. The album was released on January 28, 2022.

=== Collaborations ===
Sauvé worked with the producers Tim Bran and Louis-Étienne Santais on her song "Heaven, Wait", released in 2021. They worked on the song remotely, with Tim in England and Sauvé and Louis-Étienne in Canada. They also used a string ensemble from the Fame Studio in Macedonia on the recording.

She has also collaborated with producer Thomas Bartlett, also known as Doveman, on her song "Don't Know Why".

=== Red Frontier ===
Ghostly Kisses provided the score to the Spotify Original series podcast, Red Frontier, which premiered on June 14, 2021. The podcast was written, directed, and executive produced by Emmy Award-winning director Sarah Nolen. It stars Betty Gilpin, Finn Wittrock, Ashley Park, Charlie Barnett, and Maria Dizzia.

=== In television ===
The song "Empty Note" by Ghostly Kisses has been featured in the Netflix series The Rain and Skam Italia.

== Discography ==
=== Studio albums ===
Title	Details
Ghostly Kisses	Released: May 2019; Label: Return To Analog
Heaven, Wait	Released: 21 January 2022; Label: Akira Records
Darkroom	Release: 17 May 2024; Label: Akira Records
Across the Pond	Release: 12 Aug 2026; Label: Baisers Fantomatiques

=== Extended plays ===
Title	Details
What You See	Released: 24 March 2017; Label: Akira Records
The City Holds My Heart	Released: 23 November 2018; Label: Akira Records
Alone Together	Released: 25 October 2019; Label: Akira Records
Never Let Me Go	Released: 5 June 2020; Label: Akira Records
