= C.W. Downer & Co. =

Former Boston-based investment bank

ALANTRA (formerly C.W. Downer & Co.)
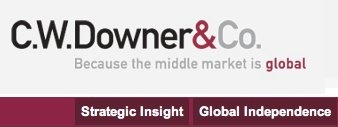
- Industry: Investment banking
- Predecessor: C.W. Downer & Co., Downer & Company
- Founded: 1975
- Founder: Charles W. Downer
- Fate: Merged to form Alantra, 2016
- Headquarters: Boston, Massachusetts, United States
- Products: Mergers & Acquisitions
- Number of employees: 345
- Website: www.alantra.com

C.W. Downer & Co. was a Boston-based global investment bank specializing in comprehensive middle-market M&A advisory services. The firm assists both strategic and private equity clients with acquisition, divestiture, and capital raising assignments.

C.W. Downer & Co. was founded in Boston, Massachusetts, in 1975 and has additional offices in Dublin, Frankfurt, Madrid, Mumbai, Oslo, Paris, Shanghai, and Sydney. The firm is named for company founder Charles W. Downer and operated as Downer & Company until a rebranding effort was completed in 2008.

In 2016, C.W. Downer & Co. merged with the Spanish firm N+1 Group. The combined company is now called Alantra.

== History ==
Charles W. Downer founded C.W. Downer & Co. in 1975 to provide cross-border merger and acquisition advisory services with a primary focus on middle-market company ($20–500 million) transactions. In 1980, the firm opened its first international office in Paris. It later established offices in Sydney, Dublin, Frankfurt, Shanghai, Madrid, Oslo, and Mumbai.

In April 2008, the firm changed its name from Downer & Company to C.W. Downer & Co. The firm trademarked its tagline, “Because the middle-market is global,” with the United States Patent and Trademark Office.

Charles W. Downer was awarded the Association for Corporate Growth's 2010 Lifetime Achievement Award.

On April 27, 2016, C.W. Downer & Co. completed its previously announced merger with N+1, a global investment bank and asset management firm headquartered in Madrid, Spain. In addition to M&A advisory, N+1 offers debt advisory, restructuring, and equity and debt capital market services. The combined entity employed 240 investment banking professionals across 14 offices in 13 countries. The company was renamed N+1 Downer.

On September 26, 2016, N+1 Downer became Alantra. With this decision, the partners of the 19 countries and different businesses did away with brands that existed from 15 to 40 years, including N+1, Downer, Swiss Capital, Daruma, and Dinamia. Alantra's 57 partners and 345 professionals operate from 25 global offices.
