= 2000 Natural Law National Convention =

United States political event

- 2000 presidential election
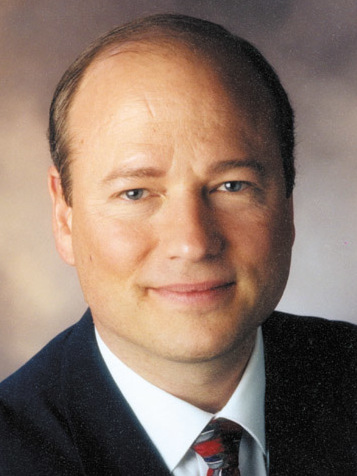
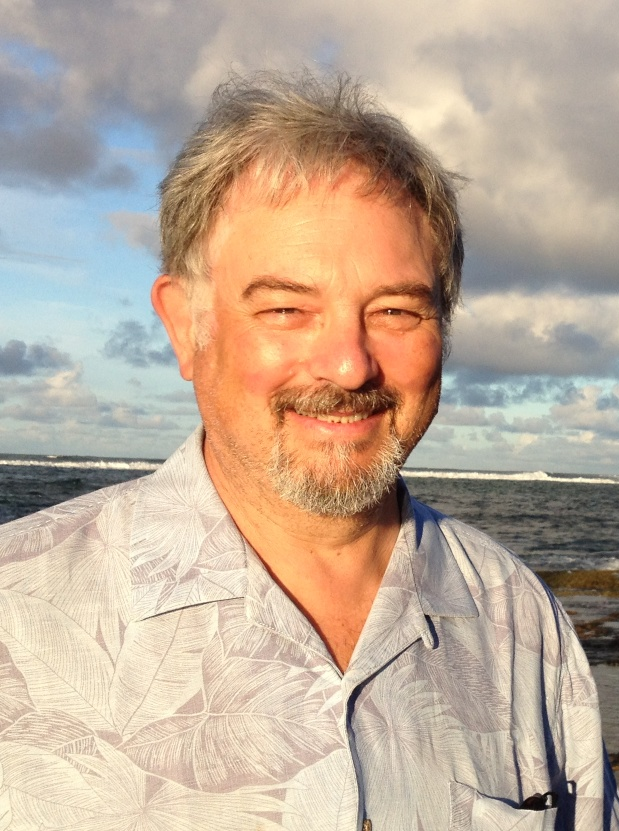
- Nominees (Hagelin & Goldhaber)

Convention
- Dates: August 31–September 2, 2000
- City: Alexandria, Virginia

Candidates
- Presidential nominee: John Hagelin of Iowa
- Vice-presidential nominee: Nat Goldhaber of California

Voting
- Total delegates: ~200

2000 Natural Law National Convention was held August 31–September 2, 2000, in Alexandria, Virginia. The presidential nominating convention occurred after Natural Law Party founder John Hagelin had received the backing of a splinter faction of the Reform Party at the 2000 Reform National Convention, and marked an formal alliance of forces between the Natural Law Party and that faction of the Reform Party. The 2000 Natural Law Convention and alliance with elements of the Reform Party was staged largely in hopes of bolstering their claim to the federal matching funds and ballot access that the Reform Party's 2000 nominees would be entitled to (with Hagelin and his running mate Nat Goldhaber claiming to be the properly-nominated Reform ticket).

== Background ==
John Hagelin had run for president as the nominee of the Natural Law Party in the preceding two presidential elections. Both runs attracted relatively little attentions. However, Haglin's 2000 presidential candidacy attracted an increased amount of attention due to his pursuit of the Reform Party nomination. Many in the Reform Party who were opposed to the candidacy of Pat Buchanan for their nomination coalesced in support of Hagelin's candidacy. On August 12, a rump Reform Party convention that splintered at the 2000 Reform National Convention nominated Hagelin for president, with Nat Goldhaber of California nominated to be his vice presidential running mate. This splinter faction and the other faction of the party that had instead nominated Buchanan remained at odds after the convention, and challenged each other with competing legal claims to the $12.6 in federal matching funds that the Reform Party was entitled to in the 2000 presidential election, as well as the state ballot access that the Reform Party was entitled to.

== Logistics ==
The convention was held August 31–September 2, 2000, in Alexandria, Virginia. It was held later than all of the other significant major and third party conventions: Green National Convention (June 24–25), Libertarian National Convention (June 30–July 3), Republican National Convention (July 31–August 3), Reform National Convention (August 10–13), and Democratic National Convention (August 14–17).

The convention had approximately 200 delegates.

The convention was regarded to be a joint convention of the Natural Law Party and the Hagelin-aligned faction of the Reform Party, which was dubbed the "Natural Law and Reform Party Coalition". The convention was viewed as a means of bolstering the Hagelin-aligned Reform Party factions bid to be recognized by the FEC as the rightful claimant to the Reform Party's federal matching funds. Among the participants in the convention was former Reform Party chairman Russ Verney. A formal alliance between the party and the faction was declared on September 1. It was further announced that Doug Friedline (former Jesse Ventura aide) had been hired as Hagelin's new campaign manager.

The Associated Press estimated attendance at the convention at 400, with half of those being delegates.

While not broadcast on major commercial networks, the convention was covered by C-SPAN.

== Nominations ==
The convention nominated Hagelin for president and Goldhaber for vice president. The nominations were unanimously delivered, without a roll call vote.

Hagelin gave his acceptance speech to the convention on August 31, before what the party advertised was a crowd of 500 supporters and delegates.

== Notable speakers ==
Speakers at the convention included:

- John Hagelin, presidential nominee
- Nat Goldhaber, vice presidential nominee and silicon valley businessman
- Lenora Fulani, third-party political organizer and 1988 presidential nominee of the New Alliance Party
- Jim Mangia, co-founder of the Reform Party
- Doug Friedline, campaign manager
- John Eastman, Natural Law nominee for U.S. Senate in Ohio
- Sue Harris DeBauche, Reform nominee in the 1997 Virginia gubernatorial election
- Omer Rains, Democratic member of the California State Senate (1974-1982)

== Platform ==
The party's platform placed a focus on matters including campaign finance reform, abortion rights, and crime prevention.

== Aftermath ==
Hagelin was unsuccessful in challenging Buchanan's claim to the FEC matching funds. However, he was successful in denying Buchanan the Reform Party's ballot access in several states, including in Michigan.
