= Take Care (film) =

- Directed by: Liz Tuccillo
- Written by: Liz Tuccillo
- Produced by: Leslie Bibb
- Starring: Leslie Bibb; Tracee Chimo; Kevin Curtis; Nadia Dajani; Betty Gilpin; Michael Godere; Marin Ireland; Elizabeth Rodriguez; Thomas Sadoski; Michael Stahl-David; Tim Wu; Heena Shim
- Cinematography: Anne Ethridge
- Edited by: John Carhart III
- Music by: Phil Hernandez; Chris Maxell; Elegant Too
- Distributed by: Phase 4 Films
- Release dates: March 7, 2014 (South by Southwest Film Festival); December 5, 2014
- Running time: 94 minutes
- Country: United States
- Language: English

Take Care is a 2014 comedy-drama film directed by Liz Tuccillo.

Take Care premiered at the South by Southwest Film Festival on July 3, 2014, and was released on December 5. The film received negative reviews from critics.

== Plot ==
A woman who, after getting hit by a car, realizes who her true friends are when they don't want to care for her as she heals. She is then forced to enlist the help of her ex-boyfriend, whom she believes owes her since she had taken care of him when he was fighting cancer during their relationship.

== Cast ==
- Leslie Bibb as Frannie
- Tracee Chimo as Rachel
- Kevin Curtis as Lawrence
- Nadia Dajani as Fallon
- Betty Gilpin as Jodi
- Michael Godere as Jason
- Marin Ireland as Laila
- Elizabeth Rodriguez as Nurse Janet
- Thomas Sadoski as Devon
- Michael Stahl-David as Kyle
- Tim Wu as Chef Wu
- Heena Shim as Friend (uncredited)

== Reception ==
On the review aggregator website Rotten Tomatoes, 25% of 12 critics' reviews are positive, with an average rating of 3.2/10. On Metacritic, the film has a score of 34 out of 100 based on 8 critics, indicating "generally unfavorable reviews". Glenn Kenny of RogerEbert.com awarded the film two stars. Sandie Angulo Chen of Common Sense Media gave the film two stars out of five.
