= Doug Friedline =

American political consultant

Douglas Friedline (1957—2006) was a Minnesota-born political campaign director in the United States. Friedline worked exclusively with independent and third-party candidates with the goal of breaking the two party oligopoly in American politics. Friedline gained most of his notoriety during the 1998 election of his home state in which he helped then professional wrestler Jesse Ventura become governor of Minnesota.

== Political career ==
Doug Friedline is best known for his unorthodox and often irreverent style of advertising. In 1998 Friedline used action figures to represent candidate Jesse Ventura in a number of television spots. In radio ads Ventura was cast in the role of a super hero fighting special interests and the opposing candidates. Friedline used similar tactics again in the 2006 Florida Election when he masterminded a multimedia blitz for Reform Party candidate Max Linn. Television, internet, and newspaper spots featured Linn as a classic cartoon hero in the vein of Superman battling various incarnations of Republican candidate (and now governor) Charlie Crist.

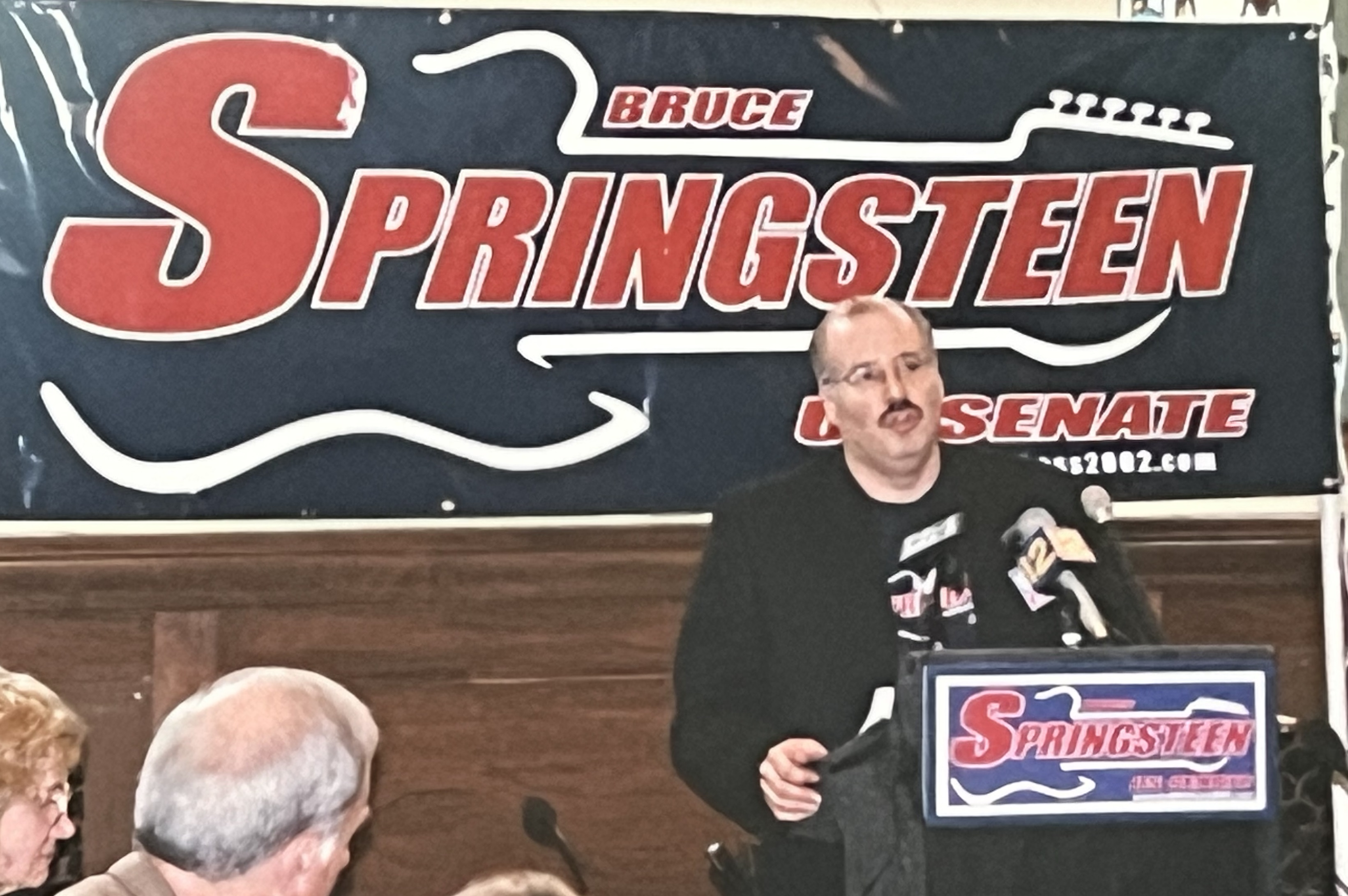

In 1999 Friedline spearheaded an exploratory committee for the Presidential run of Donald Trump.

In 2000 Friedline was the campaign manager for Natural Law Party / Reform Party Presidential candidate John Hagelin.

In 2001 Friedline took the role of campaign manager for Libertarian Party Candidate Mark Edgerton, who was running for governor of New Jersey after Friedline had moved from his native Minnesota to Chappaqua, New York. When the candidate was denied support from the national Libertarian Party, Friedline left to become campaign manager of recent independent NJ Gubernatorial candidate Bill Schluter, who had been recognized as a long time New Jersey Republican State Senator. Friedline later worked in one form or another on political ventures involving John McCain, the "Draft Springsteen For Senate Campaign " Bruce Springsteen, Ralph Nader, Matt Ahearn, Ted Glick, and Joe Piscopo.

== Anytown, USA ==
Friedline played himself as an actor in the documentary film Anytown, USA. The film followed his attempts to get independent candidate Dave Musikant, enough votes as a write-in candidate to become Mayor of Bogota, New Jersey in the 2003, three-way election race.

== Death ==
Friedline was found dead in his rented apartment just days after the completion of the Max Linn campaign in St. Petersburg, Florida, in November 2006. He had suffered a massive heart attack.
