= Untourable Album =

Studio album by Men I Trust
- Released: August 25, 2021
- Recorded: 2021
- Genres: Indie pop; dream pop; downtempo
- Length: 36:34
- Label: Self-released

Men I Trust chronology
Forever Live Sessions (2020)	Untourable Album (2021)	Forever Live Sessions, Vol. 2 (2025)

Professional ratings
Review scores
Source	Rating
Exclaim!	9.0/10
God Is in the TV	7.0/10

Untourable Album is the fourth studio album by Canadian indie band Men I Trust. The album was released on August 25, 2021. Its album cover is derived from a 1984 photograph by Lynn Goldsmith.

== Track listing ==
Untourable Album track listing
No.	Title	Length
1.	"Organon"	2:30
2.	"Oh Dove"	3:16
3.	"Sugar"	2:56
4.	"Sorbitol"	2:58
5.	"Tree Among Shrubs"	3:08
6.	"Before Dawn"	3:33
7.	"Serenade of Water"	3:05
8.	"5 AM Waltz"	1:48
9.	"Always Lone"	3:14
10.	"Ante Meridiem"	2:26
11.	"Lifelong Song"	3:03
12.	"Shoulders"	3:26
13.	"Beluga"	1:11
Total length:		36:34
