= Bogert House (Demarest, New Jersey) =

Historic house in New Jersey, US

- U.S. National Register of Historic Places
- New Jersey Register of Historic Places
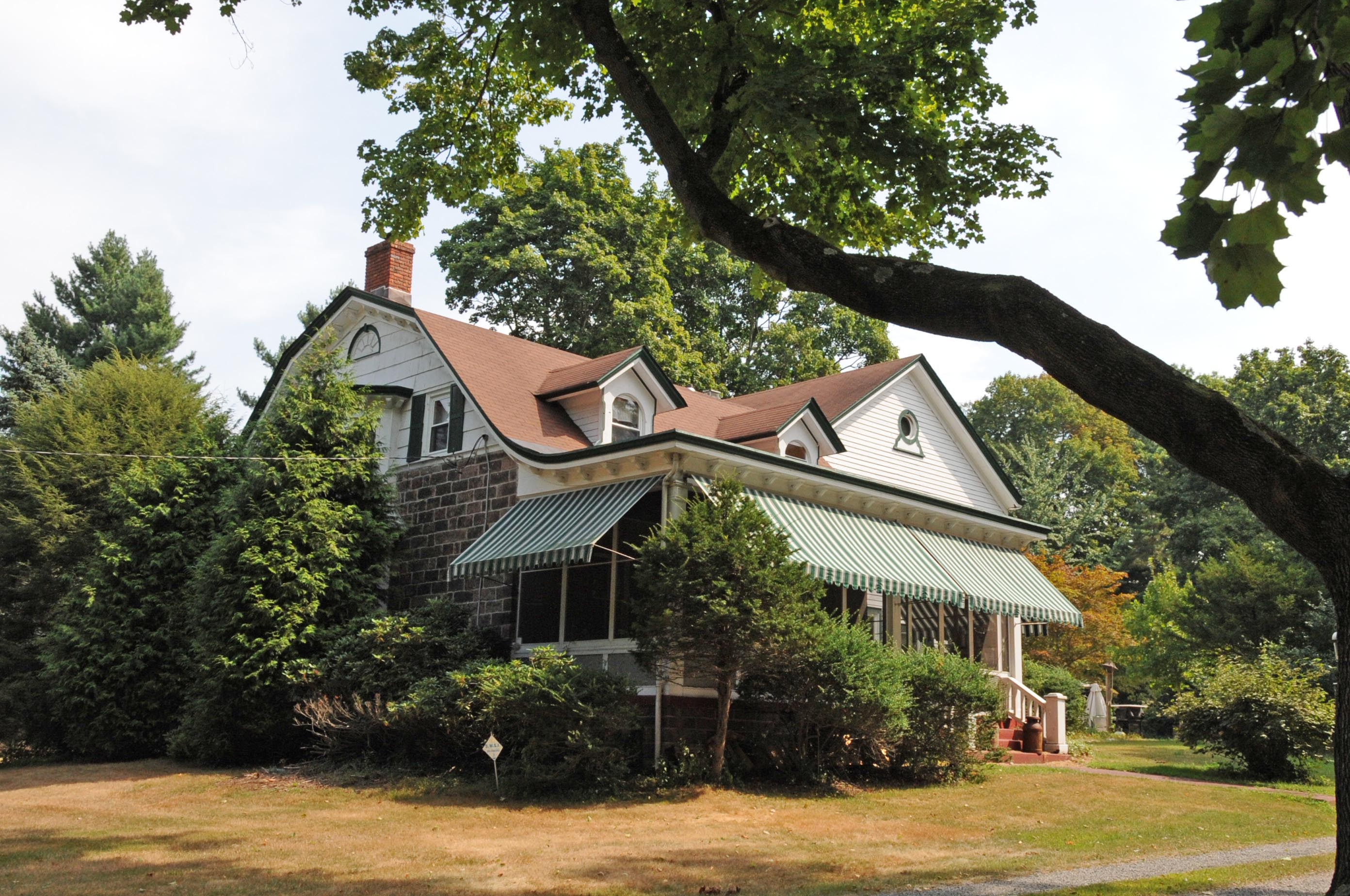

- Location within Bergen County, New Jersey Location within New Jersey Location within the United States
- Location: 324 County Road, Demarest, New Jersey
- Coordinates: 40°57′43″N 73°57′39″W
- Area: 3 acres (1.2 ha)
- Built: 1740
- MPS: Stone Houses of Bergen County TR
- NRHP reference No.: 83001476
- NJRHP No.: 452

Significant dates
- Added to NRHP: January 9, 1983
- Designated NJRHP: October 3, 1980

Bogert House is located in Demarest, Bergen County, New Jersey, United States. The house was built in 1740 and was added to the National Register of Historic Places on January 9, 1983.

== See also ==
- National Register of Historic Places listings in Bergen County, New Jersey
- John Jacob Bogert House
