= Anytown, USA (film) =

- Directed by: Kristian Fraga
- Produced by: Michael Bridenstine; Juan Dominguez; John L. Sikes
- Starring: Steve Lonegan; Fred Pesce; Dave Musikant; Doug Friedline; Bill Palatucci
- Cinematography: Jonathan Wolff
- Edited by: Robert Greene; Sandy Patch
- Music by: Robert Miller
- Production companies: XMark Monkey; 4th Row Films; Sirk Productions
- Distributed by: Film Movement
- Release date: December 9, 2005
- Running time: 93 minutes
- Country: United States
- Language: English

Anytown, USA is a 2005 documentary film produced by director Kristian Fraga on the mayoral race in Bogota, New Jersey. The mayoral race was among Republican Steve Lonegan, Democrat Fred Pesce and independent Dave Musikant.

The film is described as a candid documentary on a small town that "serves as a perfect backdrop which provides a compromising look at our nation's political climate and proves that all politics is truly local".

It was screened at the Minneapolis-St. Paul International Film Festival on April 9, 2005, where it won the award for Best Documentary.

== Synopsis ==
In August 2003, cuts to funding by the Bogota Borough Council threaten the Bogota High School football team, enraging many residents. With a mayoral election ahead, the stage is set for a close election between the incumbent, Republican Steve Lonegan, and former Borough Council Democrat Fred Pesce. Then, in late September, former high school athlete Dave Musikant announces he will run for mayor as a write-in candidate. The three-way race garners national attention, particularly because both Lonegan and Musikant are legally blind. As election day draws near, Musikant scores a coup by hiring Doug Friedline, Jesse Ventura's former campaign manager. In the week before election day, a rumor develops that Pesce is ill and will drop out of the race. However, Pesce continues to the end.

As election day dawns, poor weather worries Lonegan, who fears low turnout may cause him to lose. However, Lonegan wins with 1,097 votes, while Pesce has 728, and Musikant has 200. The Republicans also win the City Council. That January, Lonegan is inaugurated as Mayor for his third term. The football team goes on to the state championship, but loses in that game. Pesce also announces his retirement from politics. In September 2004, Musikant succumbs to his eight-year battle with brain cancer. Lonegan goes on to run for the Republican nomination for governor that year, after Jim McGreevey's resignation, but loses the primary.

== Results ==
Bogota, New Jersey 2003 mayoral election
Party	Candidate	Votes	%
Republican	Steve Lonegan (incumbent)	1,097	54.2
Democratic	Fred Pesce	728	36.0
Write-in	Dave Musikant	200	9.9
Total votes		2,225	100
Turnout		2025	55.6
Republican hold			
