= Campaigns and Elections =

Trade magazine covering political campaigns

Campaigns & Elections
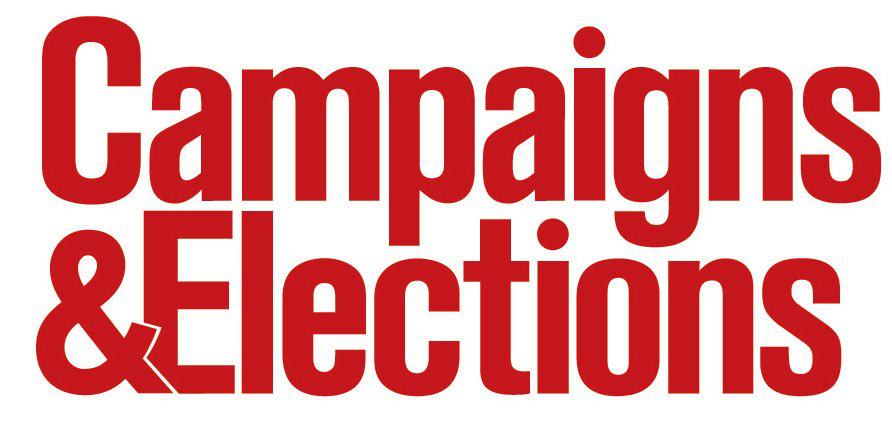
- Editor: Max Greenwood
- Categories: Politics
- First issue: 1980; 45 years ago
- Company: Political World Communications, LLC
- Country: United States
- Language: English, Spanish
- Website: www.campaignsandelections.com
- ISSN: 2160-603X
- OCLC: 641211240

Campaigns & Elections is an American trade magazine covering political campaigns, focused on tools, tactics, and techniques of the political consulting profession. The magazine was founded by Stanley Foster Reed in 1980. It is headquartered in Arlington County, Virginia.

The magazine is an exclusively digital publication. It was formerly published by Congressional Quarterly. The publication has an auxiliary website, The Political Pages, an annual directory of political firms and professionals. The magazine runs conferences and events focusing on political campaign skills and technology. The publication also has a Spanish language sister publication, Campaigns & Elections Mexico.

The publication presents the annual Reed Awards, first given in 2009, which award excellence in political campaigning, campaign management, political consulting, and political design.

== See also ==
- Michael Wolff (journalist)
