= Stanley Foster Reed =

American publisher (1917–2007)

- Born: September 28, 1917; Bogota, New Jersey, U.S.
- Died: October 25, 2007 (aged 90)
- Occupations: Entrepreneur, Inventor, Publisher

Stanley Foster Reed (1917–2007) was an entrepreneur, inventor, and publisher who founded Reed Research Inc. in 1940, the journal Mergers & Acquisitions in 1965, and the magazine Campaigns & Elections in 1980.

== Early life and education ==
Reed was born in Bogota, New Jersey on September 28, 1917, the third son of Beryl Turner Reed and Morton Gilman Reed, and grew up in Hartsdale and White Plains, New York.

== Career ==
He started a roofing company and worked briefly at a sheet metal factory for Pittsburgh Steel. In 1940, at age 23, he started up a scientific research company, renting a two-story building next to a junk yard along the Chesapeake and Ohio Canal in the Georgetown section of Washington, D.C.

Reed lived in McLean, Virginia, for 40 years. In 1981, he earned an MBA from Loyola College in Baltimore, Maryland, at the age of 64. In 1994, he moved to Charleston, South Carolina, to take a position as the Entrepreneur-in-Residence at the College of Charleston, where he taught advanced management courses. He also lived in Philadelphia, Annapolis, Maryland, and Culpeper, Virginia.

Reed started the publications Directors & Boards and of Export Today. He was the author of several books, including the best-selling The Art of M & A (co-authored with his daughter, Alexandra Lajoux), and The Toxic Executive.

He built Reed Research, Inc., and the Reed Research Foundation over the next 20 years to a net worth of $1 million. Along with Manley St. Denis, Johann Martinek, Gordon Yeh, James Ahlgren and others, he worked on issues ranging from safe land mine removal to electrocardiography to language learning laboratories, obtaining scores of patents in the process. Based on his work experience, he was admitted to membership in the Society of Naval Architects and received certification as a Professional Engineer (P.E.).

In 1962, after selling Reed Research to Log-Etronics, Inc., he started Tech-Audit as well as the Reed Research Institute for Creative Studies in the RCA Building on K Street in Washington, where he ran a number of publishing businesses. In the 1960s, he was actively involved in social issues, sponsoring programs to encourage inner-city entrepreneurship and writing an article on the poor of Appalachia. He also participated as a panelist in seminars of the Aspen Institute and as a guest lecturer at various universities including the University of Colorado’s World Affairs Conference and Georgetown University, where he once discussed ethics. He was an “ideas man” who in addition to starting publications also started a mergers newsletter and a website in his later years.

== Death ==
Reed died on October 25, 2007, at University of Virginia Health System in Charlottesville, Virginia, from a subdural hematoma, at the age of 90.

== Sources ==
- Bernstein, Adam. "Stanley Reed, 90; Helped Create Niche Magazines", The Washington Post, October 30, 2007. Accessed October 31, 2007.
