= Robert Miller (composer) =

Film composer

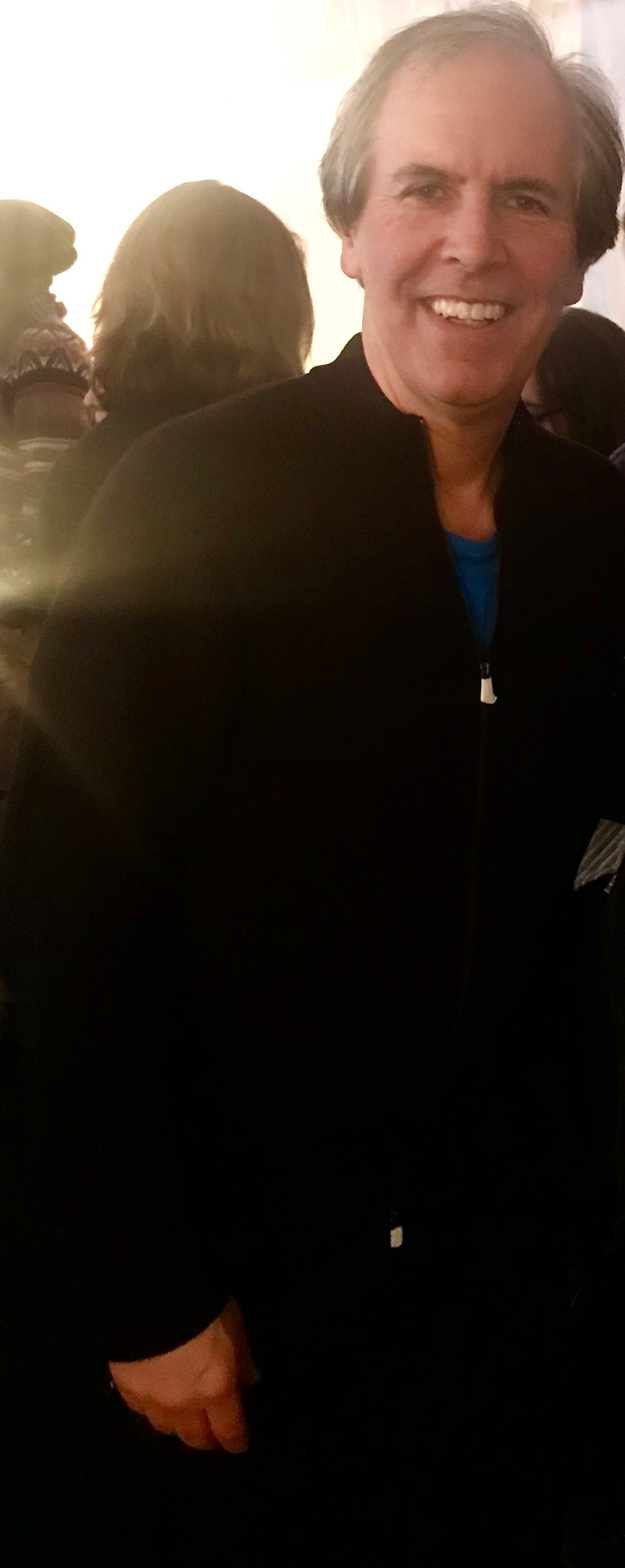
- Miller in 2018

Background information
- Genres: Film score
- Occupation: Composer
- Website: rmimusic.com

Robert Miller is an American music composer for film, television and concert hall. Over the years he has earned seven Clio Awards, two AICP Awards, two Emmy "group" nominations for the Coca-Cola spot “It’s Mine” as well as collective Emmys for Coca-Cola's “Heist". In 2016, Miller received an Emmy nomination for Outstanding Music Interpretation for the film "Of Miracles and Men".

== Career ==
=== Film scoring ===
Miller's film scoring career ranges across documentaries, thrillers, dramas, and comedies. Some notable films include:

- Why We Fight
- Teeth
- Anytown, USA
- Happy Tears
- The House I Live In
- Particle Fever
- You Get Me
- Celtics/Lakers: Best of Enemies
- Atomic Homefront
- Excuse Me for Living
- The Forgotten Kingdom
- Future '38
- I Love You, Daddy
- THE KING
- Knife Skills

=== Commercial scoring ===
Miller has scored commercials for Coca-Cola, Mercedes, GE, Pedigree, BMW, Gillette, Toyota, Budweiser, PlayStation, Travelers, SAP, UPMC, Levi's, and many more.
