= Men I Trust =

Canadian indie band

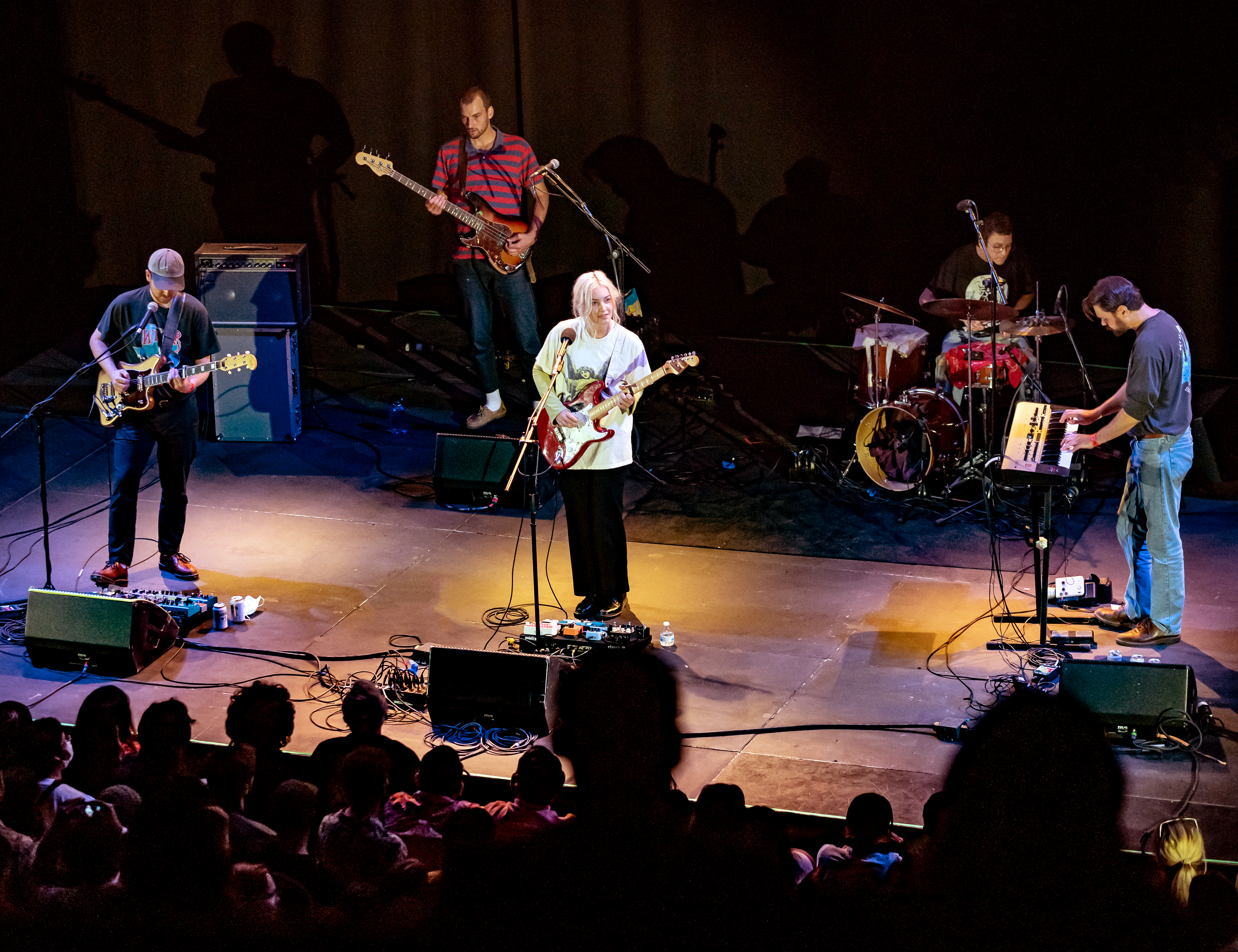
- (L–R) Jessy Caron, touring member Cédric Martel, Emmanuelle Proulx, touring member Eric Maillet, and Dragos Chiriac in 2021

Background information
- Origin: Québec City, Quebec, Canada
- Genres: Indie pop; dream pop; electropop
- Years active: 2014–present
- Label: No label
- Members: Jessy Caron; Dragos Chiriac; Emmanuelle Proulx
- Past members: Odile Marmet-Rochefort
- Website: menitrust.com

Men I Trust is a Canadian indie band formed in Montreal, Quebec, in 2014. The band consists of Emmanuelle Proulx (lead vocals, guitar), Jessy Caron (guitar, bass guitar), and Dragos Chiriac (keyboards). The group has self-released all of their music.

Men I Trust has independently released six studio albums: Men I Trust (2014), Headroom (2015), Oncle Jazz (2019), Untourable Album (2021), Equus Asinus (2025), and Equus Caballus (2025). They have also released two physical-only extended plays (EPs), Men I Trust (2017) and Tailwhip (2018).

== History ==
=== 2014–2017: Men I Trust, Headroom, and physical EPs ===
Men I Trust was founded in 2014 by high school friends Jessy Caron and Dragos Chiriac, who reunited in the music department at Université Laval. They released a self-titled album in 2014; the band later performed at the Montreal Jazz Festival, Quebec City Summer Festival, and M for Montreal.

They released their second studio album Headroom in 2015. The album featured multiple vocalists, including Ghostly Kisses and Emmanuelle Proulx, who joined the group full-time as lead vocalist and guitarist in March 2016. Vocalist Odile Marmet-Rochefort also joined around this time.

On March 3, 2016, Men I Trust released the song "Humming Man", followed by the song "Lauren" on June 13. In October and November 2016, the band embarked on a China tour, playing shows in Shenzhen, Beijing, and Shanghai. After the tour, Marmet-Rochefort left the band to be a full-time member of her band De La Reine. On December 16, 2016, the band released the single "Plain View", alongside a music video made up of clips from their 2016 China Tour.

=== 2017–2021: Oncle Jazz and Forever Live Sessions ===
On May 10, 2017, Men I Trust released the single "You Deserve This" alongside a music video filmed in Bucharest, Romania. This was followed by the singles "Tailwhip" on August 18, and "I Hope to Be Around" on November 10, with accompanying music videos. On February 28, 2018, they released the single "Show Me How" along with a music video. In 2018, they embarked on a North American tour. They performed at Coachella on April 14 and 21, 2019. They also performed at Lollapalooza on August 3, 2019.

On November 29, 2018, the group announced their third studio album Oncle Jazz, which released on September 13, 2019. The album had initially been scheduled for release in February 2019, but was delayed multiple times due to the band's touring schedule and so they could ensure that it was ready. Eight of the twelve singles released since their previous album were reworked and included on this album.

In a conversation with writer Nick Fulton for Billboard, the band noted that the green, solitary confines of rural Quebec were influential in shaping how the album sounded. Proulx stated "It put us in a really different creative mood and we were able to focus more, because there's nothing to do outside of the house except for walking and thinking about music." Oncle Jazz was long-listed for the 2020 Polaris Music Prize.

In 2020, Men I Trust released their first live album, Forever Live Sessions, featuring songs from Oncle Jazz and other work. On June 16, 2021, they were featured in an episode of the NPR web series Tiny Desk (Home) Concert recorded in Quebec.

=== 2021–2024: Untourable Album ===
The band announced their fourth studio album, Untourable Album, on June 23, 2021, with it releasing on August 25, 2021. A picture taken by photographer Lynn Goldsmith serves as the album cover. The photo appeared in a 1984 photography book titled, A Day in the Life of Canada, and features two children in front of the Lunenburg Academy in Lunenburg, Nova Scotia. When the band reached out to Goldsmith's licensing administrator to use the photo, they were met with concerns that her pricing would be out of their league given the fame of her past album cover clientele. However, as a fan of Men I Trust, Goldsmith was willing to license the photo at an "indie band price for the love of music."

Written and recorded during the lockdown era of the COVID-19 pandemic, the title sprang from an expectation that touring on the album would be impossible. However, an injury sustained by keyboardist Dragos Chiriac resulted in delays in publishing long enough to enable the group to tour on the album after all. The paradoxically titled Untourable Tour, in North America, ran from September to November 2021. This was followed by the Untourable Euro Tour from May to October 2022, with an additional US tour supported by Homeshake and Feng Suave from November to December 2022.

On June 29, 2022, Men I Trust released the song "Hard to Let Go", the first single since the release of their previous studio album. This was followed by the release of the single and video for "Billie Toppy" on September 28, and the single "Girl" on October 12. In November 2022, Men I Trust performed "Show Me How" with Joey Badass on The Tonight Show Starring Jimmy Fallon. From March to April 2023, the band toured Asia and Oceania. In July 2023, Men I Trust embarked on a tour of Europe and toured the United States in October and November 2023. On September 9, 2024, the band released the single, "Husk".

=== 2025–present: Forever Live Sessions, Vol. 2 and Equus albums ===
On February 10, 2025, Men I Trust released Forever Live Sessions, Vol. 2. The following day on February 11, the band announced their upcoming fifth and sixth studio albums: Equus Asinus and Equus Caballus respectively, which were supported by the Equus Tour, which ran from July to October 2025. Equus Asinus was released on March 19, and Equus Caballus was released on May 6.

Equus Asinus was longlisted for the 2025 Polaris Music Prize, and Equus Caballus was longlisted for the 2026 Polaris Music Prize.

== Musical style ==
Men I Trust self-describes their music as a blend of "dream pop and indie elements" whereby blending "hypnotic melodies and captivating vocals they have been able to transcend a genre into their own musical space". NPR called Men I Trust an electropop band, Our Culture Mag describes the band as indie, and online music publication The Fader described their style as dream pop. Their sound has also been classified as lo-fi and noted to have elements of R&B, jazz, and funk.

== Band members ==
=== Current members ===
- Jessy Caron – guitars, bass guitar (2014–present)
- Dragos Chiriac – keyboards (2014–present)
- Emmanuelle "Emma" Proulx – lead vocals, guitars (2016–present) (Proulx has also released solo music under the name Bernache)

=== Current touring musicians ===
- Eric Maillet – drums (2018–present)
- Alexis – bass guitar (2018, 2022–present)

=== Former members ===
- Odile Marmet-Rochefort – vocals (2016–2017)

=== Former touring musicians ===
- Cédric Martel – bass guitar (2019–2021, 2024)
- Mathieu – drums

== Discography ==
=== Albums ===
==== Studio albums ====
List of studio albums with selected details
Title	Album details
Men I Trust	Released: May 28, 2014; Formats: Cassette, vinyl, digital download, streaming
Headroom	Released: June 30, 2015; Formats: Cassette, vinyl, digital download, streaming
Oncle Jazz	Released: September 13, 2019; Formats: Vinyl, CD, digital download, streaming
Untourable Album	Released: August 25, 2021; Formats: Vinyl, CD, digital download, streaming
Equus Asinus	Released: March 19, 2025; Formats: Streaming, vinyl, CD, cassette
Equus Caballus	Released: May 6, 2025; Formats: Streaming, vinyl, CD, cassette

==== Live albums ====
List of live albums with selected details
Title	Album details
Forever Live Sessions	Released: July 9, 2020; Formats: Vinyl, CD, digital download, streaming
Forever Live Sessions, Vol. 2	Released: February 10, 2025; Formats: Vinyl, CD, digital download, streaming

=== EPs ===
Title	EP details
Men I Trust	Released: April 22, 2017; Formats: Cassette, vinyl, CD
Tailwhip	Released: October 14, 2017; Formats: Cassette, vinyl, CD

=== Singles ===
List of singles as lead artist showing year released and album name
Title	Year	Album
"Humming Man"	2016	Non-album singles
"Lauren"	2016	Non-album singles
"Plain View"	2016	Non-album singles
"You Deserve This"	2017	Oncle Jazz
"Tailwhip"	2017	Oncle Jazz
"I Hope to Be Around"	2017	Oncle Jazz
"Show Me How"	2018	Oncle Jazz
"Seven"	2018	Oncle Jazz
"Say, Can You Hear"	2018	Oncle Jazz
"Numb"	2019	Oncle Jazz
"Norton Commander (All We Need)"	2019	Oncle Jazz
"Lucky Sue"	2020	Non-album singles
"Tides"	2021	Non-album singles
"Hard To Let Go"	2022	Non-album singles
"Billie Toppy"	2022	Equus Caballus
"Girl"	2022	Equus Asinus
"Ring of Past"	2023	Equus Caballus
"Husk"	2024	Equus Caballus
