= Future '38 =

- Directed by: Jamie Greenberg
- Screenplay by: Jamie Greenberg
- Produced by: Joanna Bowzer; Daryl Goldberg
- Starring: Nick Westrate; Sean Young; Betty Gilpin
- Cinematography: Alan McIntyre Smith
- Edited by: Jamie Greenberg
- Music by: Robert Miller
- Release date: January 24, 2017 (Slamdance)
- Running time: 75 minutes
- Country: United States
- Language: English

Future '38 is a 2017 American science fiction romantic comedy film written and directed by Jamie Greenberg.

== Plot ==
A scientist from World War II time-travels to 2018 to retrieve an isotope that will prevent WWII.

== Cast ==
- Nick Westrate as Essex
- Betty Gilpin as Banky
- Tom Riis Farrell as Lamont Hitler, son of Adolf
- Robert John Burke as General Sportwood
- Ethan Phillips as Dr. Elcourt
- Sophie von Haselberg as Iota
- Ilana Becker as Elke
- Neil deGrasse Tyson as himself, introducing the almost forgotten movie
- Sean Young as Mabel
- Hillel Meltzer as Matzoh
- Anthony DeVito as Bitter Herb
- Michael Birch as Officer O'Reilly

== Plot summary ==
In 1938 Hitler annexed Sudetenland, and in order to prevent him to further escalate and start another World War, American scientists are working on a new super bomb based on the Formica atom and the formula F = mc2, in the top secret project "Top-Secret", in "Vastly Clandestine Program". But the Formica isotope takes 80 years to gain full strength. A secret agent is sent to the year 2018 to bring back the matured isotope in time to test the new bomb to stop Hitler. After all, the scientists discovered that time and matter are interchangeable. Our agent has just 24 hours to get used to the new technology as envisioned back in 1938, to get the matured isotope.

== Reception ==
The film has a 75% approval rating on Rotten Tomatoes, based on 12 reviews with an average score of 5.67/10.
