= Steve Lonegan =

American politician

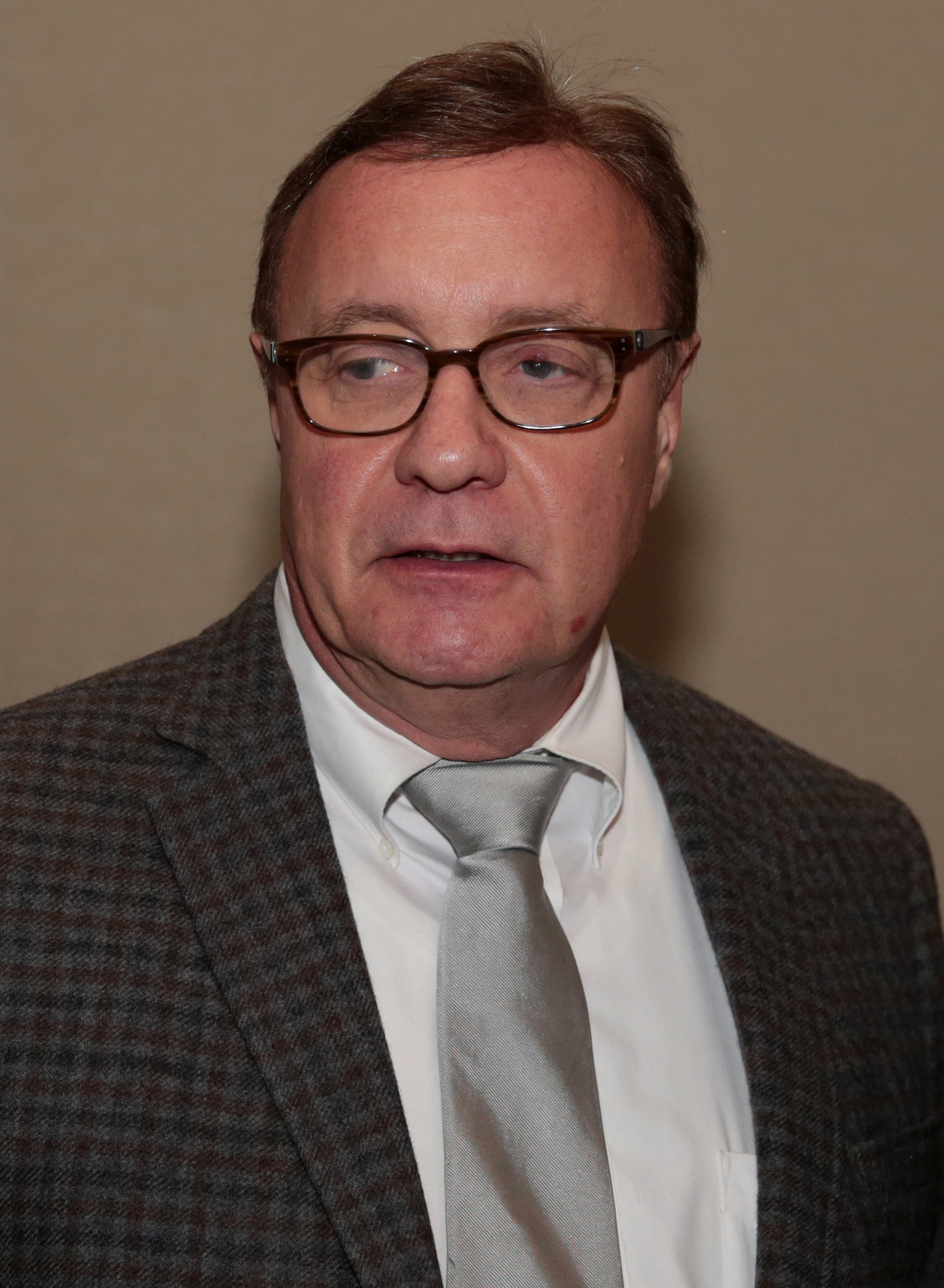

Mayor of Bogota
- In office January 1, 1996 – December 31, 2007
- Preceded by: Leonard Nicolosi
- Succeeded by: Pat McHale

Personal details
- Born: Steven Mark Lonegan; April 27, 1956 (age 70) Teaneck, New Jersey, U.S.
- Party: Republican
- Spouse: Lorraine Rossi
- Education: William Paterson University (BA); Fairleigh Dickinson University (MBA)

Steven Mark Lonegan (born April 27, 1956) is an American businessman and politician who served as mayor of Bogota, New Jersey, from 1996 to 2007. He was also the Republican Party's nominee in the 2013 Special Senate election in New Jersey, which he lost to Cory Booker.

Lonegan was named the New Jersey State Chairman for the Ted Cruz 2016 presidential campaign in June 2015. He also served as a national spokesman for the campaign and appeared on various news outlets such as Fox News, Fox Business, CNN, and MSNBC.

Lonegan was Director of Monetary Policy for the American Principles Project. He served as the organization's national spokesman on monetary policies of the Federal Reserve System and directed the Fix the Dollar project until January 2016.

Lonegan lectured across the country to a range of audiences on the history of money and current monetary policy conditions. On February 27, 2015, Lonegan led a team of economists and conservative think tank leaders into a meeting with Federal Reserve Chair Janet Yellen and Federal Reserve officials at the Washington, D.C., headquarters of the Federal Reserve System.

In August 2015, through American Principles Project, Lonegan hosted an international monetary conference in Jackson Hole, Wyoming that included leaders from around the world and was held directly opposite the Federal Reserve's annual economic symposium.

Previously, Lonegan served as the State Director of the New Jersey chapter of Americans for Prosperity and was an unsuccessful candidate for the Republican nomination for Governor of New Jersey in 2005 and 2009. He was the unsuccessful nominee in the October 2013 special election to fill New Jersey's open U.S. Senate seat following the death of Frank Lautenberg.

== Early life and background ==
Lonegan was born at Holy Name Medical Center in Teaneck, New Jersey. His grandparents emigrated from Italy and Ireland. He graduated from Ridgefield Park High School, where he was a football lineman for the Ridgefield Park Scarlets. He went on to play four years at William Paterson University.

He was diagnosed with retinitis pigmentosa at the age of 14, and is now legally blind.

Lonegan has owned a custom home building business and a cabinet-making business. He served as the state national and finance vice president for the National Federation of Independent Business. He graduated in 1980 from William Paterson College with a B.A. in Business Administration and in 1981 earned a Master of Business Administration degree from Fairleigh Dickinson University.

== Political career ==
=== Mayor of Bogota ===
In 1995, Lonegan was elected Mayor of Bogota, New Jersey, defeating incumbent Democrat Leonard Nicolosi. He was reelected in 1999 and 2003 by double-digit margins. As mayor, he cut municipal spending, merged several municipal departments and privatized some services. Lonegan ordered the municipality to hire civilian dispatchers to answer telephones at police headquarters at lower pay than uniformed officers, angering the local police union; successfully fought the implementation of LOSAP (Length of Service Award Program), which extended pension payments to volunteer fire and rescue personnel; and required that local union contracts exceeding inflation be put to voters for approval. While he was in office, Republicans long in the minority in Democratic-leaning Bogota, controlled the municipal council for 11 straight elections. Lonegan did not seek reelection in 2007, stating a belief in term limits.

In 1997, Lonegan became the Republican nominee for New Jersey State Senator against Democratic incumbent Byron Baer, a 26-year veteran of the state legislature. Running in the 37th legislative district, where no Republican had ever won, Lonegan received 39.3% of the vote, losing to Baer by a 10,301 vote margin. Lonegan then became a candidate for the U.S. House of Representatives in 1998, challenging freshman Democrat Steve Rothman in New Jersey's 9th congressional district. Democrats had held this seat since Robert Torricelli defeated Republican Harold C. Hollenbeck in 1982. Rothman defeated Lonegan by 43,513 votes, 65%-34%.

The 2003 mayoral election in Bogota was chronicled in the documentary Anytown, USA.

In 2006, Lonegan filed papers for a public referendum in Bogota on making English the official language for the municipality. The public question was rejected by the County Clerk's office, which is partly responsible for officiating elections, on legal advice that it violated state and federal law.

On January 19, 2008, Lonegan was arrested by New Jersey State Police troopers for trespassing at a town hall meeting scheduled by Governor Jon Corzine at a high school in Middle Township, New Jersey. Lonegan was standing on the school's lawn protesting when police and school officials asked him to move to a designated protest area and remove a sign he was holding. Police arrested him when he refused. School officials later apologized and the police dropped the charges.

=== State Director of Americans for Prosperity ===
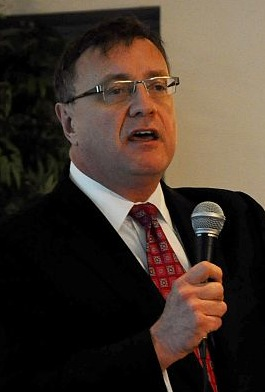
Steve Lonegan attends AFP "Maxed Out Spending Tour."

From 2007 to 2013, Lonegan served as the New Jersey State Director and Senior Policy Analyst for Americans for Prosperity, a conservative public policy organization. He resigned to run for U.S. Senate.

In 2003, Lonegan formed the group "stopthedebt.com" and filed lawsuits against the State of New Jersey in New Jersey's Supreme Court, challenging state debt sold without voter approval in violation of the state constitution's "debt limitation clause". In its findings against Lonegan and the group, the court stated two reasons for not requiring voter approval of that debt. First, that the debt was issued to finance a constitutional mandate: the requirement that "The Legislature shall provide for the maintenance and support of a thorough and efficient system of free public schools for the instruction of all children in the State between the ages of five and eighteen years" (Article VIII Section IV). Second, that the debt was technically not backed by the full faith and credit of New Jersey, and future lawmakers could refuse to honor that contract at any time.

=== Gubernatorial campaigns ===
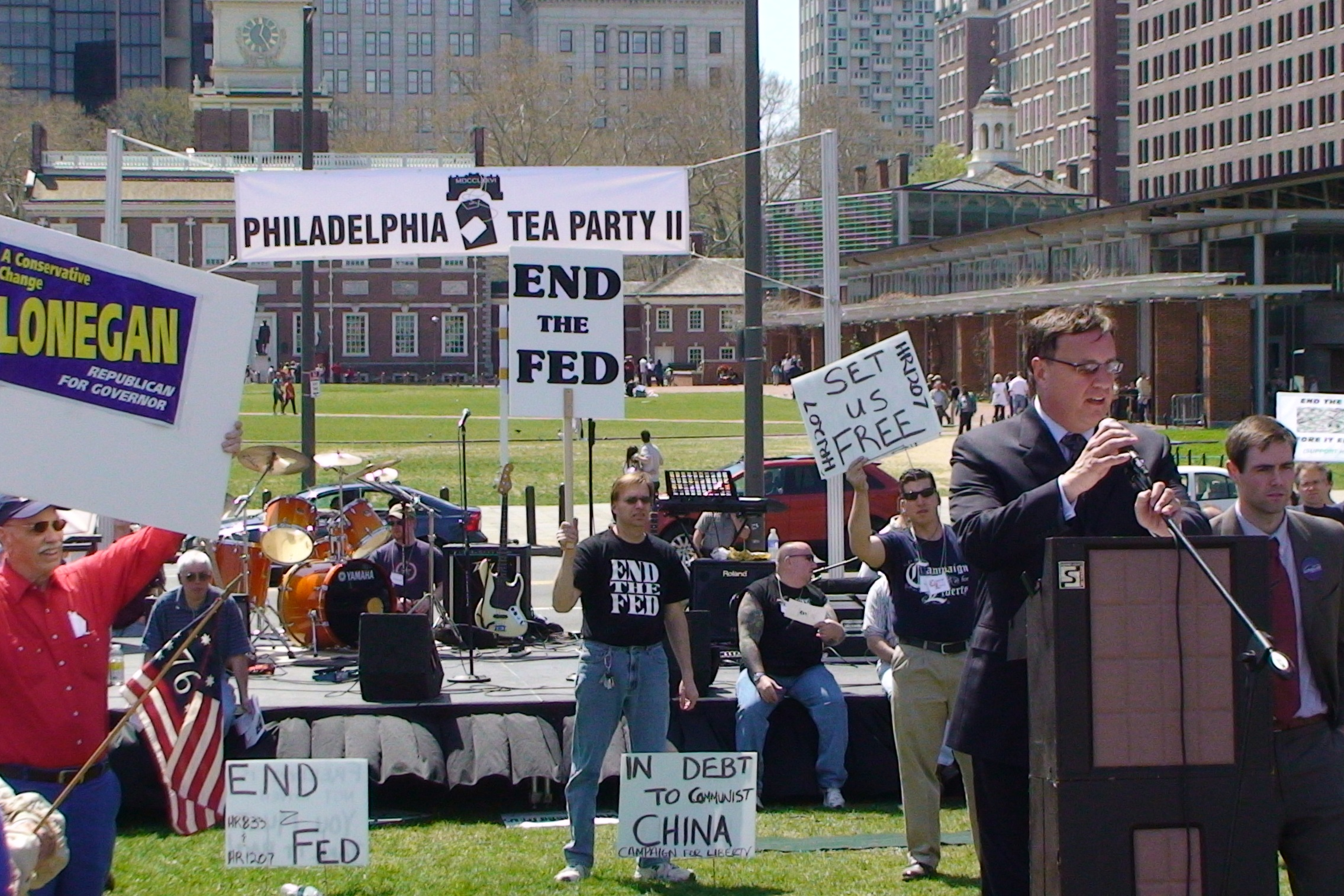
Steve Lonegan addresses protestors at the Philadelphia Tea Party protest on April 18, 2009.

Lonegan ran for the Republican nomination for governor in the state's 2005 election and finished fourth, in a field of 7 with 8.08% of the vote after the nominee, businessman Doug Forrester, former Jersey City Mayor Bret Schundler and Morris County Freeholder John Murphy and defeated Assembly Majority Leader Paul DeGaetano, Former Freedholder Todd Caliguire and Assemblyman Robert Schroeder.

On December 1, 2008, Lonegan announced that he would run for the Republican nomination for Governor of New Jersey, his second run for the seat. Lonegan promised to cut the size of state government by more than 20% and said he would run on the issues of property taxes, school funding and affordable housing. Lonegan sought to run as a conservative alternative to the more liberal candidate, former U.S. Prosecutor Chris Christie. On June 2, Lonegan lost the primary to Christie by a 55–44% vote.

=== 2013 U.S. Senate campaign ===
In June 2013, Lonegan announced that he would run to fill New Jersey's open U.S. Senate seat following the death of Senator Frank Lautenberg. Lonegan easily won the Republican primary in August 2013, making him the Republican Party's nominee in the October 2013 special election Lonegan was defeated in the election by Democrat Cory Booker. He lost by nearly eleven percentage points.

=== 2014 and 2018 U.S. House campaigns ===
Lonegan announced in October 2013 that he would run in the November 2014 election to represent New Jersey's 3rd congressional district in the United States House of Representatives. Incumbent Jon Runyan had chosen not to run for reelection. Lonegan lost to Tom MacArthur with 40% voting for Lonegan as opposed to MacArthur's 60%.

In 2017, Lonegan announced his candidacy for the 2018 elections in New Jersey's 5th congressional district against Democratic incumbent Josh Gottheimer. He ultimately lost to former Cresskill Borough Councilman John McCann in the Republican primary.

=== 2016 Ted Cruz Presidential campaign ===
On December 10, 2015, Lonegan announced his endorsement of Ted Cruz for the Republican nomination for president in 2016 and became Chairman of Cruz's campaign in New Jersey. Lonegan became Cruz's first major endorsement in New Jersey at a time when New Jersey's own Governor, Chris Christie, was also a candidate. Lonegan assembled a total of 121 endorsements for Cruz, including Cruz county chairs in all 21 counties. On May 3, 2016, Lonegan described Republican frontrunner Donald Trump as "Hillary Clinton with a penis".

== See also ==
Party political offices
Preceded by Dick Zimmer	Republican nominee for U.S. Senator from New Jersey (Class 2); 2013	Succeeded by Jeff Bell
