= Bogert House (Bogota, New Jersey) =

Historic house in New Jersey, US

- U.S. National Register of Historic Places
- New Jersey Register of Historic Places
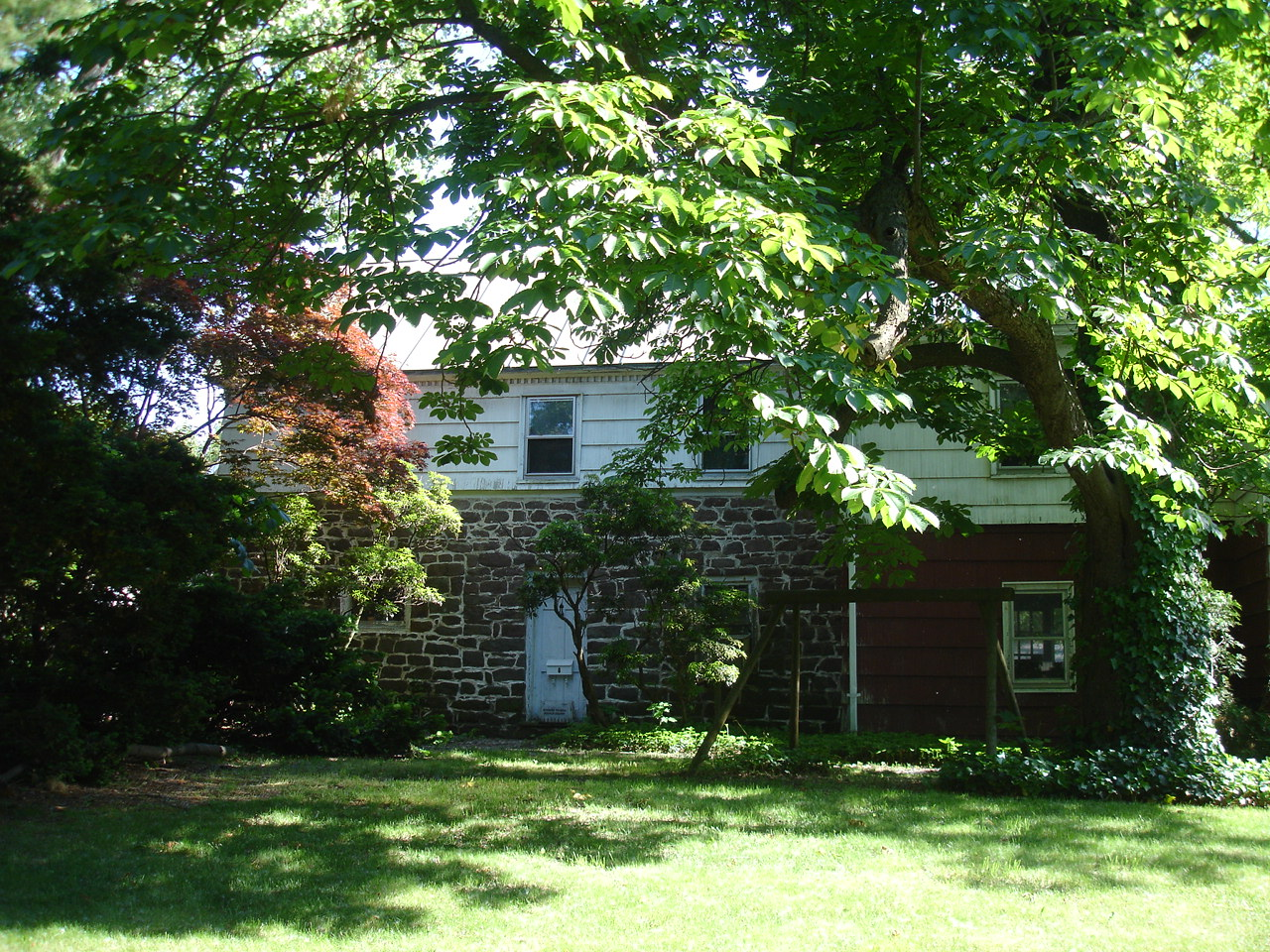
- The Bogert House in Spring 2010

- Location within Bergen County, New Jersey Location within New Jersey Location within the United States
- Location: 4 Lynn Court, Bogota, New Jersey
- Coordinates: 40°52′59″N 74°1′58″W
- MPS: Stone Houses of Bergen County TR
- NRHP reference No.: 83001475
- NJRHP No.: 436

Significant dates
- Added to NRHP: January 9, 1983
- Designated NJRHP: October 3, 1980

The Bogert House is located at 4 Lynn Court in the borough of Bogota in Bergen County, New Jersey, United States. The stone house was listed on the National Register of Historic Places on January 9, 1983, for its significance in architecture. It was listed as part of the Early Stone Houses of Bergen County Multiple Property Submission (MPS).

== See also ==
- National Register of Historic Places listings in Bergen County, New Jersey
