= Betty Gilpin =

American actress (born 1986)

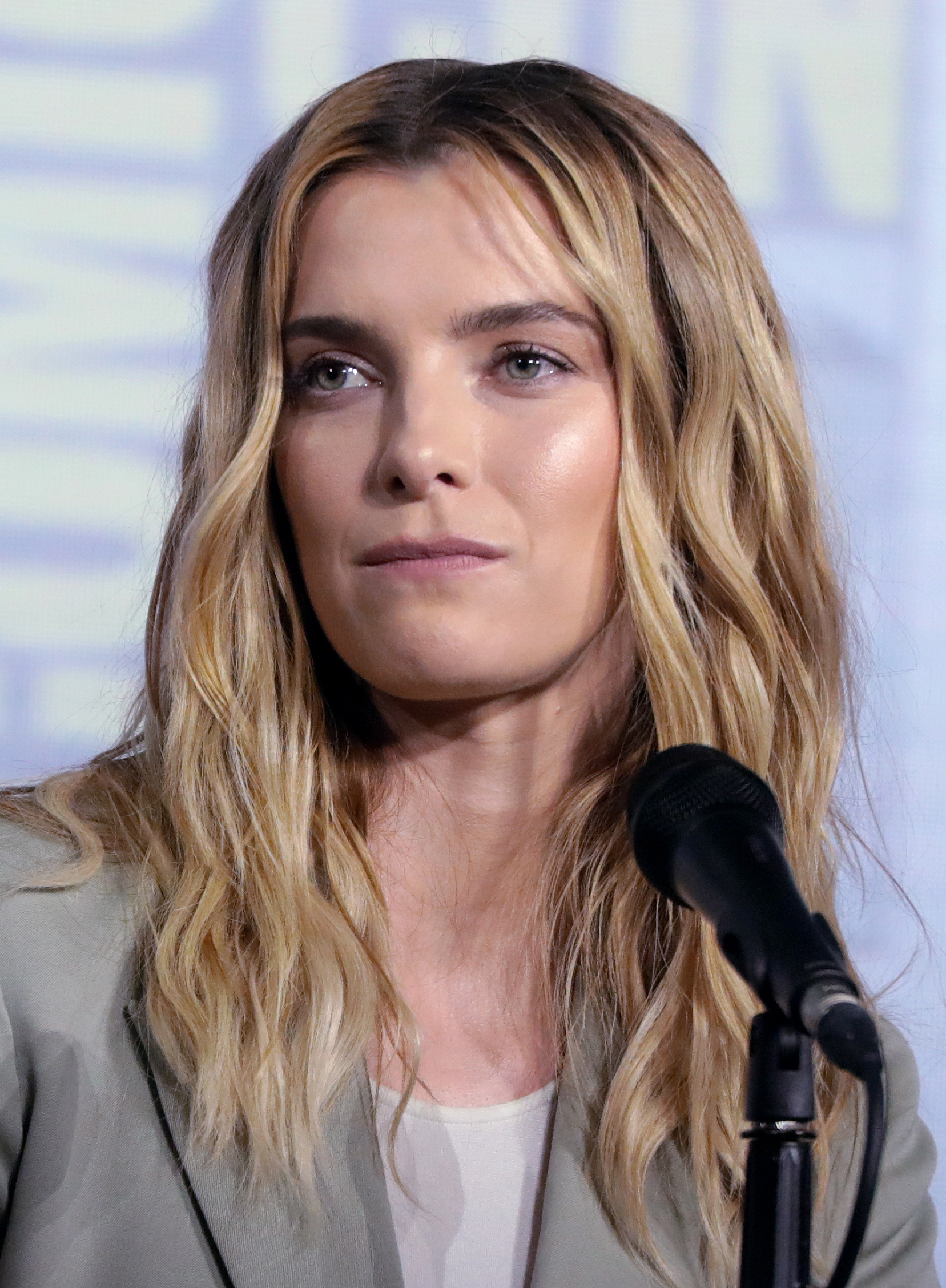
- Gilpin at the 2019 San Diego Comic-Con
- Born: July 21, 1986 (age 40); New York City, U.S.
- Education: Fordham University (BA)
- Occupation: Actress
- Years active: 2006–present
- Spouse: Cosmo Pfeil (m. 2016)
- Children: 2
- Father: Jack Gilpin

Elizabeth Gilpin (born July 21, 1986) is an American actress. She portrayed Debbie "Liberty Belle" Eagan in the Netflix comedy series GLOW (2017–2019), for which she was nominated for three Primetime Emmy Awards for Outstanding Supporting Actress in a Comedy Series. She also starred as Dr. Carrie Roman in the Showtime comedy-drama series Nurse Jackie (2013–2015).

In 2023, she starred in the lead role as a nun who battles A.I. in the Peacock science-fiction series Mrs. Davis. Gilpin made her Broadway debut in 2025 as Mary Todd Lincoln in Oh, Mary!. She most recently guest-starred in the 2026 Apple TV comedy-horror series Widow's Bay as Sarah Westcott Warren, wife of the town's founder, Richard Warren, for which she won the Primetime Emmy Award for Outstanding Guest Actress in a Comedy Series. In 2026, Gilpin joined the cast of the FX series The Lowdown for its second season, playing Ginger, a public defender.

Gilpin has appeared in the mystery thriller film True Story (2015), the science-fiction romantic comedy Future '38 (2017), the fantasy romantic comedy Isn't It Romantic (2019), the drama A Dog's Journey (2019), and the action comedy Stuber (2019). In 2020, Gilpin starred in the horror film The Grudge, the satiric thriller film The Hunt, and the action comedy Coffee & Kareem. For The Hunt, she won a Critics' Choice Super Award for Best Actress in an Action Movie.

== Early life ==
Gilpin was born on July 21, 1986, the daughter of actors Jack Gilpin and Ann McDonough. Her father, also an Episcopal priest, is a first cousin of Drew Gilpin Faust, the president of Harvard University from 2007 to 2018. Elizabeth grew up in the South Street Seaport neighborhood of Manhattan, where she says that her family home was "one of the only occupied buildings on the block" and the area where she lived was a fish market. Elizabeth Gilpin is a 2004 graduate of the Loomis Chaffee School and graduated from Fordham University in 2008.

== Career ==
Gilpin began her acting career with guest starring roles in television series including Law & Order: Criminal Intent, Fringe, Medium, Law & Order: Special Victims Unit, and Elementary. She received further recognition for her starring role as Dr. Carrie Roman in the Showtime comedy-drama series Nurse Jackie, appearing from 2013 to the series' conclusion in 2015. She has also appeared off-Broadway in productions Heartless, I'm Gonna Pray for You So Hard, and We Live Here. Gilpin had supporting roles in the films Ghost Town (2008), Take Care (2014), True Story (2015), and Future '38 (2017).

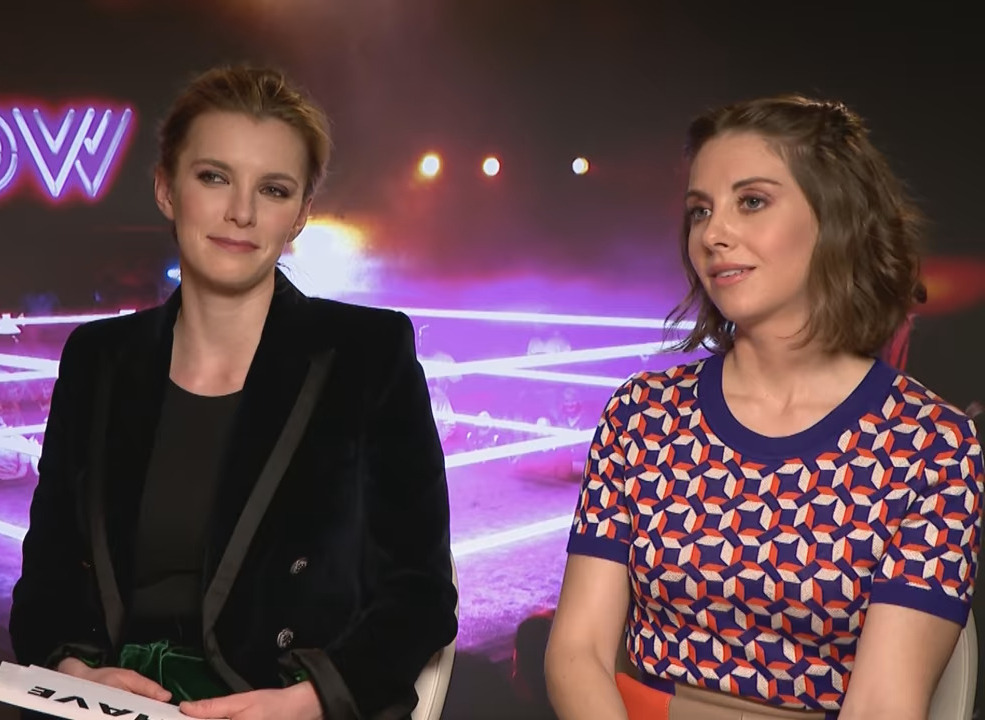
Gilpin (left) with fellow GLOW actress Alison Brie in July 2018.

Her breakthrough came with her starring role as Debbie "Liberty Belle" Eagan in the Netflix comedy-drama series GLOW (2017–2019), which was inspired by the 1980s female professional wrestling league Gorgeous Ladies of Wrestling. She received critical acclaim and award nominations for her performance including three Critics' Choice Television Awards for Best Supporting Actress in a Comedy Series and three Primetime Emmy Awards for Outstanding Supporting Actress in a Comedy Series.

Between 2019 and 2020, Gilpin appeared in the fantasy romantic comedy film Isn't It Romantic, the comedy-drama film A Dog's Journey, the action comedy film Stuber, and the action horror film The Hunt. In 2021, she appeared in the science fiction action movie The Tomorrow War. In the same year, Gilpin was set to star in the HBO series Blood Sugar. In 2022, she appeared as Mo Dean in the Starz political thriller limited series Gaslit. She received recognition for her role with a nomination for the Critics' Choice Television Award for Best Supporting Actress in a Movie/Miniseries. In the same year, she appeared in an episode of the Apple TV+ anthology series Roar.

In September 2022, she published a collection of 20 essays titled All the Women in My Brain: And Other Concerns. In 2023, Gilpin starred as Sister Simone / Elizabeth Abbott, a nun who battles artificial intelligence in the Peacock science fiction series Mrs. Davis. For her performance, Gilpin received critical acclaim and was nominated for the TCA Award for Individual Achievement in Drama. She had a main voice role as Irene in the Netflix animated adventure series Skull Island.

In 2025, Gilpin starred in the Netflix Western miniseries American Primeval with Taylor Kitsch, in which she played a woman seeking to cross the frontier with her young son amid hostilities between Mormon Militias, Indians, and the federal government. She also played Lucretia Garfield in the Netflix historical drama miniseries Death by Lightning. She made her Broadway debut taking over the role of Mary Todd Lincoln from Cole Escola in Oh, Mary!, for an eight-week engagement in early 2025. In 2026, she guest starred in the Apple TV comedy-horror television series Widow's Bay as Sarah Westcott Warren, wife of the town founder, Richard Warren.

== Personal life ==
While in high school at Loomis Chafee School, Gilpin dated actor and musician Damon Daunno. In 2016, she married actor Cosmo Pfeil and their daughter was born in November 2020. In May 2024, Gilpin's second daughter was born.

== Filmography ==
=== Film ===
Year	Title	Role	Notes	Ref.
2008	Death in Love	Young Model		
2008	Ghost Town	WWII Nurse		
2009	The Northern Kingdom	Carissa		
2014	Beach Pillows	Karla		
2014	Take Care	Jodi		
2015	True Story	Cheryl Frank		
2017	Future '38	Banky		
2019	Isn't It Romantic	Whitney		
2019	A Dog's Journey	Gloria Mitchell		
2019	Stuber	Becca		
2020	The Grudge	Nina Spencer		
2020	The Hunt	Crystal Creasey		
2020	Coffee & Kareem	Detective Linda Watts		
2021	The Tomorrow War	Emmy Forester		
2026	Office Romance	Sydney Bloom		
2026	The Social Reckoning	Kris		
2027	Alone at Dawn		Post-production	

=== Television ===
Year	Title	Role	Notes	Ref.
2006	Law & Order: Criminal Intent	Amanda Dockerty	Episode: "The War at Home"	
2008	New Amsterdam	Marika Soloway	Episode: "Golden Boy"	
2008	Fringe	Loraine Daisy	Episode: "The Same Old Story"	
2009	Law & Order: Criminal Intent	Stacey Hayes-Fitzgerald	Episode: "Playing Dead"	
2009	The Unusuals	Abigail Allen / Margo Stanford	Episode: "The E.I.D."	
2009	Law & Order	Paige Regan	Episode: "For the Defense"	
2010	The Good Wife	Molly	Episode: "Painkiller"	
2010	Past Life	Corrine	Episode: "Dead Man Talking"	
2010	Medium	Kim Clement	Episode: "Allison Rolen Got Married"	
2012	Law & Order: Special Victims Unit	Natalie Relais	Episode: "Learning Curve"	
2013–2015	Nurse Jackie	Dr. Carrie Roman	34 episodes	
2015	The Walker	Roz	8 episodes	
2015	The Mysteries of Laura	Isabel Van Doren	Episode: "The Mystery of the Watery Grave"	
2016	Elementary	Fiona Helbron	4 episodes	
2016	Mercy Street	Eliza Foster	2 episodes	
2016	Masters of Sex	Dr. Nancy Leveau	9 episodes	
2017	American Gods	Audrey	2 episodes	
2017–2019	GLOW	Debbie Eagan	30 episodes	
2018–2021	Robot Chicken	Laurie Jupiter / Louisa von Trapp / Veronica Lodge (voice)	2 episodes	
2022	Gaslit	Maureen Kane Dean	8 episodes	
2022	Roar	Amelia	Episode: "The Woman Who Was Kept on a Shelf"	
2023	Mrs. Davis	Sister Simone / Elizabeth Abbott	8 episodes	
2023	Skull Island	Irene (voice)	6 episodes	
2024	Three Women	Lina	Lead role	
2025	American Primeval	Sara Rowell	Miniseries	
2025	The Terminal List: Dark Wolf	Amy Edwards	3 episodes	
2025	Hal & Harper	Kate	Supporting role; miniseries	
2025	Death by Lightning	Lucretia Garfield	Miniseries	
2026	The Simpsons	Amy (voice)	Episode: "Extreme Makeover: Homer Edition"	
2026	Widow's Bay	Sarah Westcott Warren	Guest role; 2 episodes	
2026	The Lowdown	Ginger	Main role (season 2)	

=== Theatre ===
Year	Title	Role	Venue	Notes
2008	Good Boys and True	Cheryl Moody	Second Stage Theater	Off-Broadway
2008	Boys' Life	Lisa	Second Stage Theater	Off-Broadway
2009	What is the Cause of Thunder	Ophelia	Williamstown Theatre Festival	Regional
2010	That Face	Izzy	Manhattan Theatre Club	Off-Broadway
2010	The Language Archive	Emma	Roundabout Theatre Company	Off-Broadway
2011	Fish Eye	Anna	Here Arts Center (Colt Coeur)	Off-Broadway
2011	We Live Here	Dinah	Manhattan Theatre Club	Off-Broadway
2012	Heartless	Elizabeth	Signature Theatre Company	Off-Broadway
2013	Where We're Born	Lily Marino	Rattlestick Playwrights Theater	Off-Broadway
2015	I'm Gonna Pray For You So Hard	Ella	Atlantic Theater Company	Off-Broadway
2015	An Intervention	A	Williamstown Theatre Festival	Regional
2016	Barcelona	Irene	Geffen Playhouse	Regional
2025	Oh, Mary!	Mary Todd Lincoln (replacement)	Lyceum Theatre	Broadway

=== Podcasts ===
Year	Title	Role	Notes	Ref.
2021	Red Frontier	Commander Taylor Fullerton	11 episodes	

== Awards and nominations ==
Year	Award	Category	Work	Result
2018	Critics' Choice Television Awards	Best Supporting Actress in a Comedy Series	GLOW	Nominated
2018	Screen Actors Guild Awards	Outstanding Performance by an Ensemble in a Comedy Series (shared with the ensemble)	GLOW	Nominated
2018	Gold Derby Awards	Best Comedy Supporting Actress	GLOW	Nominated
2018	Gold Derby Awards	Best Breakthrough Performer of the Year	GLOW	Nominated
2018	Gold Derby Awards	Best Ensemble of the Year (shared with the ensemble)	GLOW	Nominated
2018	Primetime Emmy Awards	Outstanding Supporting Actress in a Comedy Series	GLOW	Nominated
2018	22nd OFTA Television Awards	Best Supporting Actress in a Comedy Series	GLOW	Nominated
2019	Critics' Choice Television Awards	Best Supporting Actress in a Comedy Series	GLOW	Nominated
2019	Screen Actors Guild Awards	Outstanding Performance by an Ensemble in a Comedy Series (shared with the ensemble)	GLOW	Nominated
2019	Primetime Emmy Awards	Outstanding Supporting Actress in a Comedy Series	GLOW	Nominated
2020	Critics' Choice Television Awards	Best Supporting Actress in a Comedy Series	GLOW	Nominated
2020	Primetime Emmy Awards	Outstanding Supporting Actress in a Comedy Series	GLOW	Nominated
2021	Critics' Choice Super Awards	Best Actress in an Action Movie	The Hunt	Won
2022	Hollywood Critics Association TV Awards	Best Supporting Actress in a Broadcast Network or Cable Limited or Anthology Series	Gaslit	Nominated
2022	Women's Image Network Awards	Outstanding Actress in a Made For Television Movie / Limited Series	Gaslit	Nominated
2023	Critics' Choice Television Awards	Best Supporting Actress in a Movie/Miniseries	Gaslit	Nominated
2023	Television Critics Association Awards	Individual Achievement in Drama	Mrs. Davis	Nominated
2024	Critics' Choice Super Awards	Best Actress in a Science Fiction/Fantasy Series, Limited Series or Made-for-TV Movie	Mrs. Davis	Nominated
2024	Independent Spirit Awards	Best Lead Performance in a New Scripted Series	Mrs. Davis	Nominated
2025	Broadway.com Audience Choice Awards	Favorite Replacement (Female)	Oh, Mary!	Nominated
2025	Critics' Choice Television Awards	Best Supporting Actress in a Movie/Miniseries	Three Women	Nominated
2025	Independent Spirit Awards	Best Supporting Performance in a New Scripted Series	Three Women	Nominated
2026	Critics' Choice Television Awards	Best Supporting Actress in a Movie/Miniseries	Death by Lightning	Nominated
2026	Primetime Emmy Awards	Outstanding Guest Actress in a Comedy Series	Widow's Bay	Won
