= Red Frontier =

Science fiction podcast by Gimlet

Publication
- Provider: Gimlet Media

Related
- Website: gimletmedia.com/shows/red-frontier

Red Frontier is a science fiction podcast produced by Gimlet Media and starring Betty Gilpin.

== Background ==
The podcast stars Betty Gilpin as Taylor Fullerton. The cast includes Finn Wittrock, Ashley Park, Charlie Barnett, Maria Dizzia and Kara Young. The podcast is an 11 episode scifi audio drama. The creators of the show collaborated with NASA

Commander Fullerton is on a mission to Mars, but her crew died during an epidemic. Commander Fullerton's only companion is an artificial intelligence named Eve. The podcast consists of Commander Fullerton's audio diary entries.

The podcast presented a preview at the 2021 Tribeca Festival.

== See also ==
- Motherhacker
