= Mergers & Acquisitions =

American business magazine

- Cover of July-August 2025 issue
- Editor-in-chief: Mary Kathleen Flynn
- Frequency: Real-time
- Circulation: >100,000
- Publisher: James H Beecher
- Founded: 1965
- Company: Middle Market Information LLC
- Based in: Wilton, Connecticut, U.S.
- Language: English
- ISSN: 0026-0010

Mergers & Acquisitions is a real-time B2B community, featuring a monthly magazine, daily enewsletter, conferences and member gatherings that provide news, commentary, data, analysis and community around the burgeoning middle market, providing analysis regarding private equity and cross-border mergers and acquisitions.

Mergers & Acquisitions was founded as Mergers & Acquisitions Journal in 1965 by Stanley Foster Reed in Washington, D.C., who later wrote and published the book The Art of M&A with his daughter. Alexandra Lajoux. It was operated by several different companies prior to its current owner, Middle Market Information LLC. The brand's editor in chief since 2011 has been Mary Kathleen Flynn.

In addition to news and analysis about middle market M&A, Mergers & Acquisitions publishes numerous annual, monthly and weekly features and special reports that spotlight important deals and the people and firms who made them happen. These include the Most Influential Women in Mid-Market M&A, the Annual Mid-Market Awards and Dealmakers of the Year, Rising Stars of Private Equity, and M&A Most Innovative Firms.
