= John Jacob Bogert House =

Historic house in New Jersey, US

- U.S. National Register of Historic Places
- New Jersey Register of Historic Places
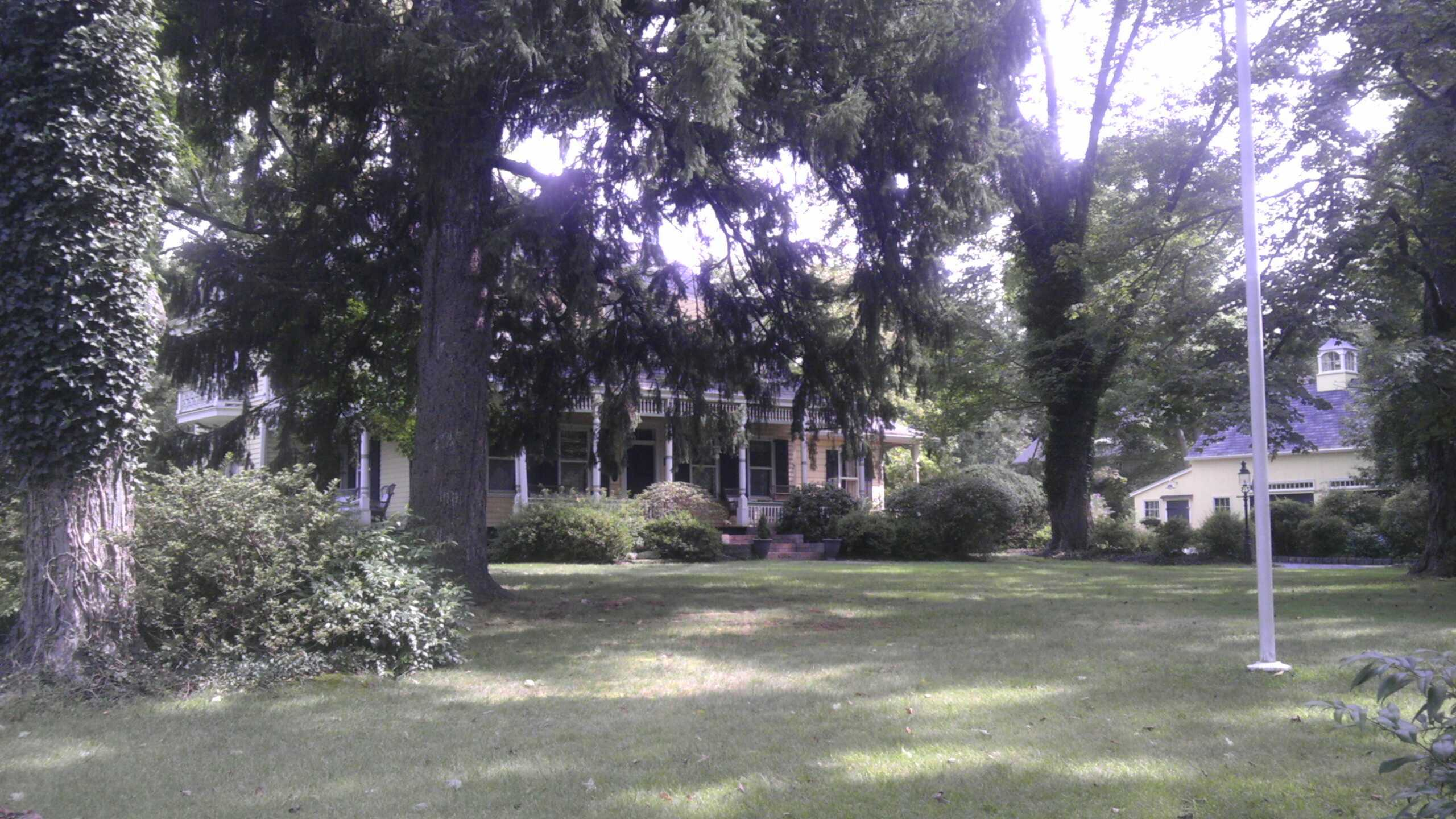

- Location within Bergen County, New Jersey Location within New Jersey Location within the United States
- Location: 163 Bogert's Mill Road, Harrington Park, New Jersey
- Coordinates: 40°59′05″N 73°59′33.4″W
- Area: less than one acre
- Built: 1830
- Architectural style: Colonial, Mid 19th Century Revival
- NRHP reference No.: 04001259
- NJRHP No.: 4375

Significant dates
- Added to NRHP: November 26, 2004
- Designated NJRHP: August 27, 2004

John Jacob Bogert House is located in Harrington Park, Bergen County, New Jersey, United States. The house was built in 1830 and was added to the National Register of Historic Places on November 26, 2004.

== See also ==
- National Register of Historic Places listings in Bergen County, New Jersey
