= Bogota, New Jersey =

Borough in Bergen County, New Jersey, US

- Borough
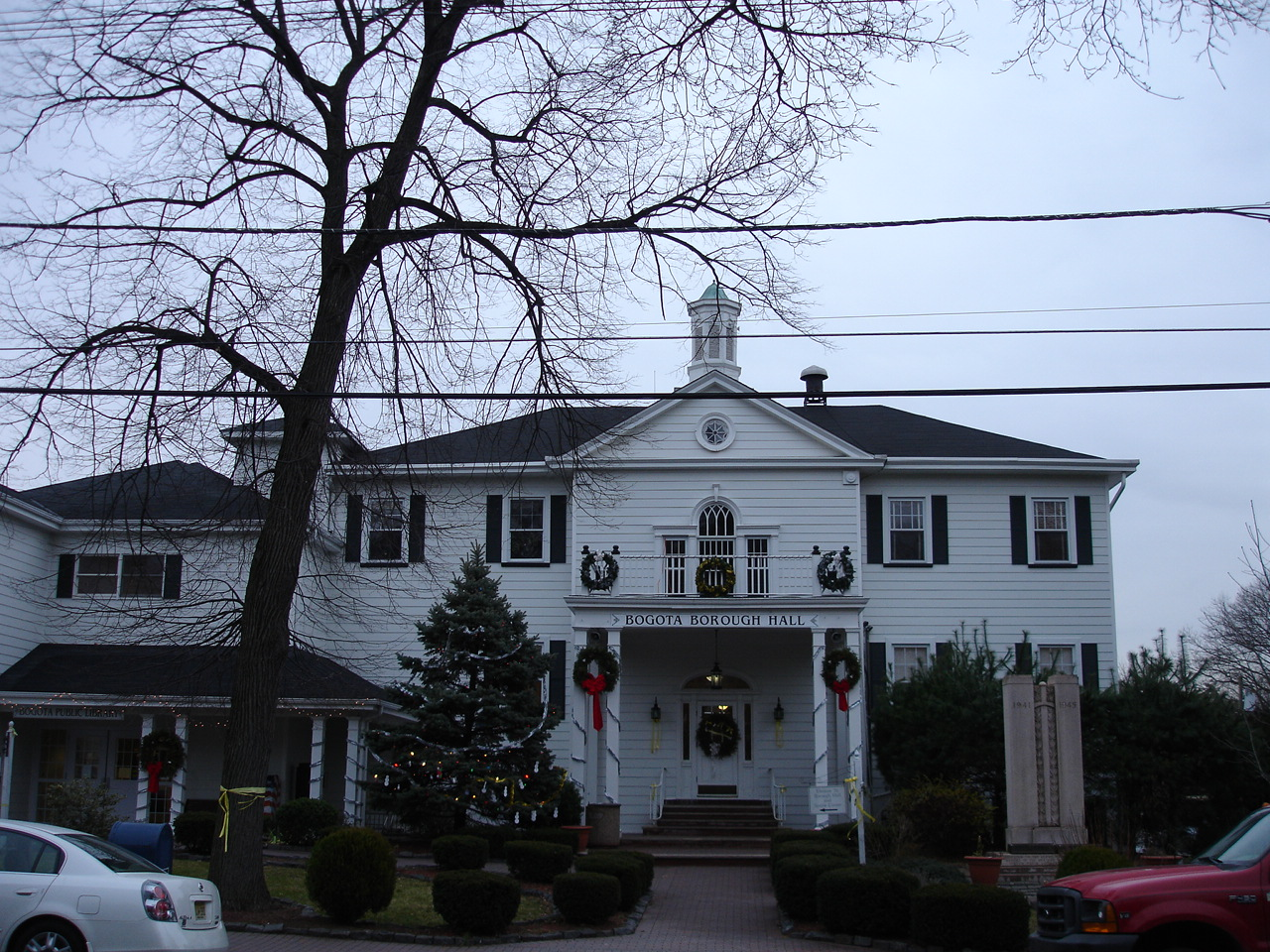
- Bogota Borough Hall

- Seal

- Location of Bogota in Bergen County highlighted in red (left). Inset map: Location of Bergen County in New Jersey highlighted in orange (right).

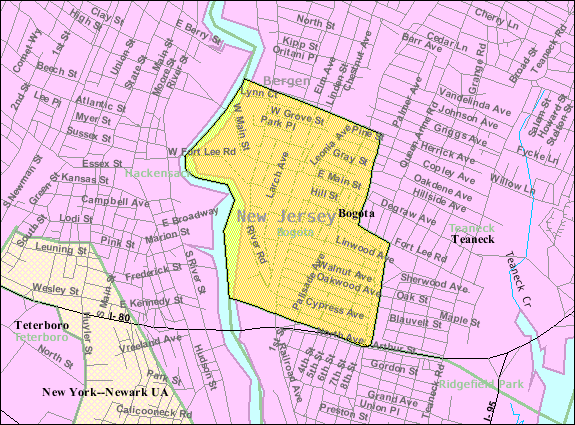
- Census Bureau map of Bogota, New Jersey

- Location in Bergen County Location in New Jersey Location in the United States
- Coordinates: 40.874293°N 74.029737°W
- Country: United States
- State: New Jersey
- County: Bergen
- Incorporated: November 14, 1894
- Named after: Bogert / Banta families

Government
  - Type: Borough
  - Body: Borough Council
  - Mayor: Daniele Fede (R, term ends December 31, 2027)
  - Administrator: Conall C. O'Malley
  - Municipal clerk: Scott Devlin

Area
  - Total: 0.80 sq mi (2.06 km^{2})
  - Land: 0.75 sq mi (1.95 km^{2})
  - Water: 0.042 sq mi (0.11 km^{2}) 5.25%
  - Rank: 522nd of 565 in state 69th of 70 in county
- Elevation: 43 ft (13 m)

Population (2020)
  - Total: 8,778
  - Estimate (2023): 9,606
  - Rank: 272nd of 565 in state 46th of 70 in county
  - Density: 11,626.5/sq mi (4,489.0/km^{2})
  - Rank: 28th of 565 in state 8th of 70 in county
- Time zone: UTC−05:00 (Eastern (EST))
  - Summer (DST): UTC−04:00 (Eastern (EDT))
- ZIP Code: 07603
- Area code: 201
- FIPS code: 3400306490
- GNIS feature ID: 0885163
- Website: www.bogotaonline.org

Bogota is a borough in Bergen County, in the U.S. state of New Jersey. As of the 2020 United States census, the borough's population was 8,778, an increase of 591 (+7.2%) from the 2010 census count of 8,187, which in turn reflected a decline of 62 (−0.8%) from the 8,249 counted in the 2000 census.

Bogota was formed on November 14, 1894, from portions of Ridgefield Township, based on the results of a referendum held that day. The borough was formed during the "Boroughitis" phenomenon then sweeping through Bergen County, in which 26 boroughs were formed during 1894 alone. Portions of Bogota were taken in 1895 to form part of the newly created Township of Teaneck. Bogota was named in honor of the Bogert family, which had been the first European settlers to occupy the area, and may also be a blend of Bogert and Banta, another early family, with an "O" added to ease pronunciation.

The borough's name is pronounced /bəˈɡoʊtə/ buh-GOH-tə, unlike Bogotá, capital city of Colombia, which is accented on the final syllable.

== Geography ==
Bogota is located on the east shore of the Hackensack River. According to the United States Census Bureau, the borough had a total area of 0.80 square miles (2.06 km^{2}), including 0.76 square miles (1.95 km^{2}) of land and 0.04 square miles (0.11 km^{2}) of water (5.25%).

The borough borders Hackensack to the west, Ridgefield Park to the south and Teaneck on the north and east.

Bogota is bisected by the CSX River Line, which divides the borough into an eastern and western portion. The eastern half is highly industrial, with more busy roads. The western half is mainly suburban, with the exception of storefronts on West Main Street, River Road, and a development on West Fort Lee Road.

== Demographics ==
Historical population
Census	Pop.	Note	%±
1900	337		—
1910	1,125		233.8%
1920	3,906		247.2%
1930	7,341		87.9%
1940	7,346		0.1%
1950	7,662		4.3%
1960	7,965		4.0%
1970	8,960		12.5%
1980	8,344		−6.9%
1990	7,824		−6.2%
2000	8,249		5.4%
2010	8,187		−0.8%
2020	8,778		7.2%
2023 (est.)	9,606	▲	9.4%
Population sources: 1900–1920 1900–1910; 1910–1930 1900–2020; 2000 2010 2020

=== Racial and ethnic composition ===
Bogota borough, Bergen County, New Jersey – Racial and ethnic composition Note: the US Census treats Hispanic/Latino as an ethnic category. This table excludes Latinos from the racial categories and assigns them to a separate category. Hispanics/Latinos may be of any race.
Race / Ethnicity (NH = Non-Hispanic)	Pop 2000	Pop 2010	Pop 2020	% 2000	% 2010	% 2020
White alone (NH)	5,207	3,411	2,614	63.12%	41.66%	29.78%
Black or African American alone (NH)	393	582	585	4.76%	7.11%	6.66%
Native American or Alaska Native alone (NH)	6	30	15	0.07%	0.37%	0.17%
Asian alone (NH)	637	795	748	7.72%	9.71%	8.52%
Native Hawaiian or Pacific Islander alone (NH)	5	7	2	0.06%	0.09%	0.02%
Other race alone (NH)	36	54	93	0.44%	0.66%	1.06%
Mixed race or Multiracial (NH)	206	139	215	2.50%	1.70%	2.45%
Hispanic or Latino (any race)	1,759	3,169	4,506	21.32%	38.71%	51.33%
Total	8,249	8,187	8,778	100.00%	100.00%	100.00%

=== 2020 census ===
As of the 2020 census, Bogota had a population of 8,778. The median age was 40.0 years. 20.4% of residents were under the age of 18 and 14.4% of residents were 65 years of age or older. For every 100 females there were 92.1 males, and for every 100 females age 18 and over there were 88.9 males age 18 and over.

100.0% of residents lived in urban areas, while 0.0% lived in rural areas.

There were 2,939 households in Bogota, of which 35.1% had children under the age of 18 living in them. Of all households, 52.3% were married-couple households, 15.0% were households with a male householder and no spouse or partner present, and 26.5% were households with a female householder and no spouse or partner present. About 20.5% of all households were made up of individuals and 9.0% had someone living alone who was 65 years of age or older.

There were 3,026 housing units, of which 2.9% were vacant. The homeowner vacancy rate was 0.9% and the rental vacancy rate was 3.3%.

=== 2010 census ===
The 2010 United States census counted 8,187 people, 2,773 households, and 2,080 families in the borough. The population density was 10,702.5 per square mile (4,132.3/km^{2}). There were 2,888 housing units at an average density of 3,775.4 per square mile (1,457.7/km^{2}). The racial makeup was 61.00% (4,994) White, 9.42% (771) Black or African American, 0.78% (64) Native American, 9.81% (803) Asian, 0.09% (7) Pacific Islander, 14.80% (1,212) from other races, and 4.10% (336) from two or more races. Hispanic or Latino of any race were 38.71% (3,169) of the population.

Of the 2,773 households, 36.4% had children under the age of 18; 54.9% were married couples living together; 14.8% had a female householder with no husband present and 25.0% were non-families. Of all households, 20.7% were made up of individuals and 7.2% had someone living alone who was 65 years of age or older. The average household size was 2.94 and the average family size was 3.43.

23.7% of the population were under the age of 18, 9.5% from 18 to 24, 26.4% from 25 to 44, 28.6% from 45 to 64, and 11.7% who were 65 years of age or older. The median age was 38.6 years. For every 100 females, the population had 91.8 males. For every 100 females ages 18 and older there were 86.9 males.

The Census Bureau's 2006–2010 American Community Survey showed that (in 2010 inflation-adjusted dollars) median household income was $77,375 (with a margin of error of +/− $13,132) and the median family income was $96,563 (+/− $12,361). Males had a median income of $53,460 (+/− $5,549) versus $46,350 (+/− $9,142) for females. The per capita income for the borough was $31,844 (+/− $2,819). About 8.2% of families and 7.9% of the population were below the poverty line, including 11.9% of those under age 18 and 3.4% of those age 65 or over.

=== 2000 census ===
As of the 2000 United States census there were 8,249 people, 2,874 households, and 2,126 families residing in the borough. The population density was 10,841.3 inhabitants per square mile (4,185.8/km^{2}). There were 2,915 housing units at an average density of 3,831.1 per square mile (1,479.2/km^{2}). The racial makeup of the borough was 75.72% White, 5.73% African American, 0.15% Native American, 7.75% Asian, 0.06% Pacific Islander, 6.76% from other races, and 3.83% from two or more races. Hispanic or Latino of any race were 21.32% of the population.

There were 2,874 households, out of which 36.5% had children under the age of 18 living with them, 56.0% were married couples living together, 13.8% had a female householder with no husband present, and 26.0% were non-families. 21.9% of all households were made up of individuals, and 8.1% had someone living alone who was 65 years of age or older. The average household size was 2.85 and the average family size was 3.38.

In the borough the population was spread out, with 25.3% under the age of 18, 8.2% from 18 to 24, 32.1% from 25 to 44, 23.3% from 45 to 64, and 11.1% who were 65 years of age or older. The median age was 36 years. For every 100 females, there were 90.4 males. For every 100 females age 18 and over, there were 87.1 males.

The median income for a household in the borough was $59,813, and the median income for a family was $69,841. Males had a median income of $49,347 versus $36,406 for females. The per capita income for the borough was $25,505. About 2.6% of families and 4.0% of the population were below the poverty line, including 2.3% of those under age 18 and 4.2% of those age 65 or over.

== Government ==
=== Local government ===
Bogota is governed under the borough form of New Jersey municipal government, which is used in 218 municipalities (of the 564) statewide, making it the most common form of government in New Jersey. The governing body is comprised of a mayor and a borough council, with all positions elected at-large on a partisan basis as part of the November general election. A mayor is elected directly by the voters to a four-year term of office. The borough council includes six members elected to serve three-year terms on a staggered basis, with two seats coming up for election each year in a three-year cycle. The borough form of government used by Bogota is a "weak mayor / strong council" government in which council members act as the legislative body, with the mayor presiding at meetings and voting only in the event of a tie. The mayor can veto ordinances subject to an override by a two-thirds majority vote of the council. The mayor makes committee and liaison assignments for council members, and most appointments are made by the mayor with the advice and consent of the council.

As of 2026, the mayor of the Borough of Bogota is Republican Daniele Fede, serving a term of office that expires on December 31, 2027. Members of the Bogota Borough Council are Council President Lisa Kohles (D, 2026), Consuelo M. Carpenter (D, 2027), William Hordern (D, 2027), Patrick H. McHale (D, 2028), John G. Mitchell (D, 2028) and Diana Vergara (D, 2026).

The council seat expiring in 2015 held by Chris Kelemen was vacated when he took office as mayor in January 2015. Citing the bitter political differences in the governing body and the loss of two council seats to Republican challengers in the general election that month, Mayor Patrick McHale resigned from office in November 2013 and was replaced on an acting basis by Council President Tito Jackson, who served in that role until the November 2014 election. In September 2011, the borough council appointed Wanda Uceta to fill the vacant seat of Joseph Nooto who had died earlier that month. In December 2013, Lisa Kohles was chosen to fill Jackson's vacant council seat for a term ending in December 2014.

In 2012, Democrats retained full control of borough government, as incumbent Jorge Nunez won re-election along with his running mate Robert Robbins, who won his first term in office.

In the November 2011 general election, Democrats gained control of all of the borough's elected positions. Patrick McHale was re-elected to a four-year term as mayor. Incumbents Michael Brophy and Tito Jackson were elected to new three-year terms, while Wanda Uceta won a two-year unexpired term and Evaristo Burdiez Jr. won his first full three-year term, after both Burdiez and Uceta had been appointed to fill vacancies.

In the 2010 General Election, Councilmen Joseph Noto and Michael Brophy won reelection, while first-time candidate Arthur Konigsberg also captured a seat. They defeated Councilwoman Anne Marie Mitchell and challengers Jared Geist and Guillermo Martinez. Brophy led the way with 1,235 votes, followed by Noto with 1,072 and Konigsberg with 1,060. Mitchell received 966 votes, while Geist and Martinez earned 847 and 775 votes, respectively. Noto and Konigsberg won three-year terms, while Brophy—who was appointed to fill a vacancy last year—will serve for an additional year to finish the uncompleted term.

In July 2006, then-Mayor Lonegan created a controversy when he engineered a borough council resolution requesting the removal of a Spanish-language billboard in the borough that was advertising McDonald's iced coffee. Lonegan said the billboard was "divisive." The story received national publicity, occurring concurrently with a national debate on illegal immigration. The 2003 mayoral election won by Lonegan was the subject of the documentary Anytown, USA.

=== Federal, state and county representation ===
Bogota is located in the 5th Congressional District and is part of New Jersey's 37th state legislative district.

For the 119th United States Congress, New Jersey's 5th congressional district is represented by Josh Gottheimer (D, Wyckoff). New Jersey is represented in the United States Senate by Democrats Cory Booker (Newark, term ends 2027) and Andy Kim (Moorestown, term ends 2031).

For the 2026–2027 session, the 37th legislative district of the New Jersey Legislature is represented in the New Jersey Senate by Gordon M. Johnson (D, Englewood) and in the General Assembly by Shama Haider (D, Tenafly) and Ellen Park (D, Englewood Cliffs).

Bergen County is governed by a directly elected County Executive, with legislative functions performed by a Board of County Commissioners comprised of seven members who are elected at-large to three-year terms in partisan elections on a staggered basis, with either two or three seats coming up for election each November; a Chairman and Vice Chairman are selected from among its seven members at a reorganization meeting held every January. As of 2025, the county executive is James J. Tedesco III (D, Paramus), whose four-year term of office ends December 31, 2026.

Bergen County's Commissioners are Chair Mary J. Amoroso (D, Mahwah, 2025), Vice Chair Steven A. Tanelli (D, North Arlington, 2027), Chair Pro Tem Joan Voss (D, Fort Lee, 2026), Rafael Marte (D, Bergenfield, 2026), Germaine M. Ortiz (D, Emerson, 2025), Thomas J. Sullivan Jr. (D, Montvale, 2025) and Tracy Silna Zur (D, Franklin Lakes, 2027).

Bergen County's elected constitutional officials are Clerk John S. Hogan (D, Northvale, 2026), Sheriff Anthony Cureton (D, Englewood, 2027) and Surrogate Michael R. Dressler (D, Cresskill, 2026).

=== Politics ===
Presidential election results

United States presidential election results for Bogota
Year	Republican		Democratic		Third party(ies)	
Year	No.	%	No.	%	No.	%
2024	1,661	41.90%	2,189	55.22%	114	2.88%
2020	1,484	33.90%	2,840	64.88%	53	1.21%
2016	1,230	32.05%	2,454	63.94%	154	4.01%
2012	1,085	31.64%	2,308	67.31%	36	1.05%
2008	1,270	35.33%	2,291	63.73%	34	0.95%
2004	1,458	41.86%	2,009	57.68%	16	0.46%
2000	1,235	37.44%	1,949	59.08%	115	3.49%
1996	1,113	32.90%	1,889	55.84%	381	11.26%
1992	1,539	43.04%	1,443	40.35%	594	16.61%
1988	2,080	57.65%	1,511	41.88%	17	0.47%
1984	2,735	67.40%	1,317	32.45%	6	0.15%
1980	2,266	57.40%	1,237	31.33%	445	11.27%
1976	2,344	58.42%	1,573	39.21%	95	2.37%
1972	2,888	69.57%	1,218	29.34%	45	1.08%
1968	2,444	59.89%	1,342	32.88%	295	7.23%
1964	1,874	46.65%	2,140	53.27%	3	0.07%
1960	2,708	68.68%	1,229	31.17%	6	0.15%

As of March 2011, there were a total of 4,345 registered voters in Bogota, of which 1,549 (35.7% vs. 31.7% countywide) were registered as Democrats, 735 (16.9% vs. 21.1%) were registered as Republicans and 2,060 (47.4% vs. 47.1%) were registered as Unaffiliated. There was one voter registered to another party. Among the borough's 2010 Census population, 53.1% (vs. 57.1% in Bergen County) were registered to vote, including 69.6% of those ages 18 and over (vs. 73.7% countywide).

On the national level, Bogota leans strongly toward the Democratic Party. In the 2016 presidential election, Democrat Hillary Clinton received 2,454 votes (63.9% vs. 54.2% countywide), ahead of Republican Donald Trump with 1,230 votes (32.1% vs. 41.1% countywide) and other candidates with 154 votes (4.0% vs. 3.0% countywide), among the 3,890 ballots cast by the borough's 5,244 registered voters for a turnout of 74.2% (vs. 73% in Bergen County). In the 2012 presidential election, Democrat Barack Obama received 2,308 votes (66.7% vs. 54.8% countywide), ahead of Republican Mitt Romney with 1,085 votes (31.4% vs. 43.5%) and other candidates with 30 votes (0.9% vs. 0.9%), among the 3,458 ballots cast by the borough's 4,796 registered voters, for a turnout of 72.1% (vs. 70.4% in Bergen County). In the 2008 presidential election, Democrat Barack Obama received 2,291 votes (63.3% vs. 53.9% countywide), ahead of Republican John McCain with 1,270 votes (35.1% vs. 44.5%) and other candidates with 26 votes (0.7% vs. 0.8%), among the 3,619 ballots cast by the borough's 4,759 registered voters, for a turnout of 76.0% (vs. 76.8% in Bergen County).

Gubernatorial election results for Bogota
Year	Republican		Democratic		Third party(ies)	
Year	No.	%	No.	%	No.	%
2025	874	32.18%	1,823	67.12%	19	0.70%
2021	845	39.36%	1,289	60.04%	13	0.61%
2017	728	35.24%	1,289	62.39%	49	2.37%
2013	1,178	55.23%	913	42.80%	42	1.97%
2009	856	40.09%	1,151	53.91%	128	6.00%
2005	1,007	43.11%	1,276	54.62%	53	2.27%

In the 2017 gubernatorial election, Democrat Phil Murphy received 62.4% of the vote (1,289 cast), ahead of Republican Kim Guadagno with 35.2% (728 votes), and other candidates with 2.4% (49 votes), among the 2,147 ballots cast by the borough's 5,053 registered voters (81 ballots were spoiled), for a turnout of 42.5%. In the 2013 gubernatorial election, Republican Chris Christie received 55.2% of the vote (1,178 cast), ahead of Democrat Barbara Buono with 42.8% (913 votes), and other candidates with 2.0% (42 votes), among the 2,243 ballots cast by the borough's 4,694 registered voters (110 ballots were spoiled), for a turnout of 47.8%. In the 2009 gubernatorial election, Democrat Jon Corzine received 1,151 ballots cast (53.1% vs. 48.0% countywide), ahead of Republican Chris Christie with 856 votes (39.5% vs. 45.8%), Independent Chris Daggett with 119 votes (5.5% vs. 4.7%) and other candidates with 9 votes (0.4% vs. 0.5%), among the 2,168 ballots cast by the borough's 4,549 registered voters, yielding a 47.7% turnout (vs. 50.0% in the county).

United States Senate election results for Bogota1
Year	Republican		Democratic		Third party(ies)	
Year	No.	%	No.	%	No.	%
2024	1,400	38.07%	2,126	57.82%	151	4.11%
2018	916	32.69%	1,814	64.74%	72	2.57%
2012	963	30.26%	2,182	68.57%	37	1.16%
2006	947	40.03%	1,388	58.66%	31	1.31%

United States Senate election results for Bogota2
Year	Republican		Democratic		Third party(ies)	
Year	No.	%	No.	%	No.	%
2020	1,297	30.51%	2,827	66.50%	127	2.99%
2014	759	35.22%	1,378	63.94%	18	0.84%
2013	668	43.92%	838	55.10%	15	0.99%
2008	1,105	34.66%	2,042	64.05%	41	1.29%

== Education ==
Students in pre-kindergarten through twelfth grade are educated in the Bogota Public Schools. As of the 2022–23 school year, the district, comprised of four schools, had an enrollment of 1,381 students and 103.1 classroom teachers (on an FTE basis), for a student–teacher ratio of 13.4:1. Schools in the district (with 2022–23 enrollment data from the National Center for Education Statistics.) are E. Roy Bixby School with 293 students in grades PreK–5, Lillian M. Steen School which served 326 students in grades PreK–5, Bogota Middle School with an enrollment of 197 students in grades 6–7 and Bogota High School with an enrollment of 442 students in grades 8–12. Lillian M. Steen School was one of nine schools in New Jersey honored in 2020 by the National Blue Ribbon Schools Program, which recognizes high student achievement.

Public school students from the borough, and all of Bergen County, are eligible to attend the secondary education programs offered by the Bergen County Technical Schools, which include the Bergen County Academies in Hackensack, and the Bergen Tech campus in Teterboro or Paramus. The district offers programs on a shared-time or full-time basis, with admission based on a selective application process and tuition covered by the student's home school district.

Saint Joseph Academy was a Catholic school serving students in pre-kindergarten through eighth grade, operating under the auspices of the Roman Catholic Archdiocese of Newark. In summer of 2020 the Roman Catholic Archdiocese of Newark made the decision to close the Saint Joseph Academy "...due to increasing financial burdens, declining enrollment and Covid 19 pandemic" The former site of the Saint Joseph Academy was leased to the Bogota Board of Education for a five year period and is currently used for preschooland grades 6 and 7.

== Transportation ==
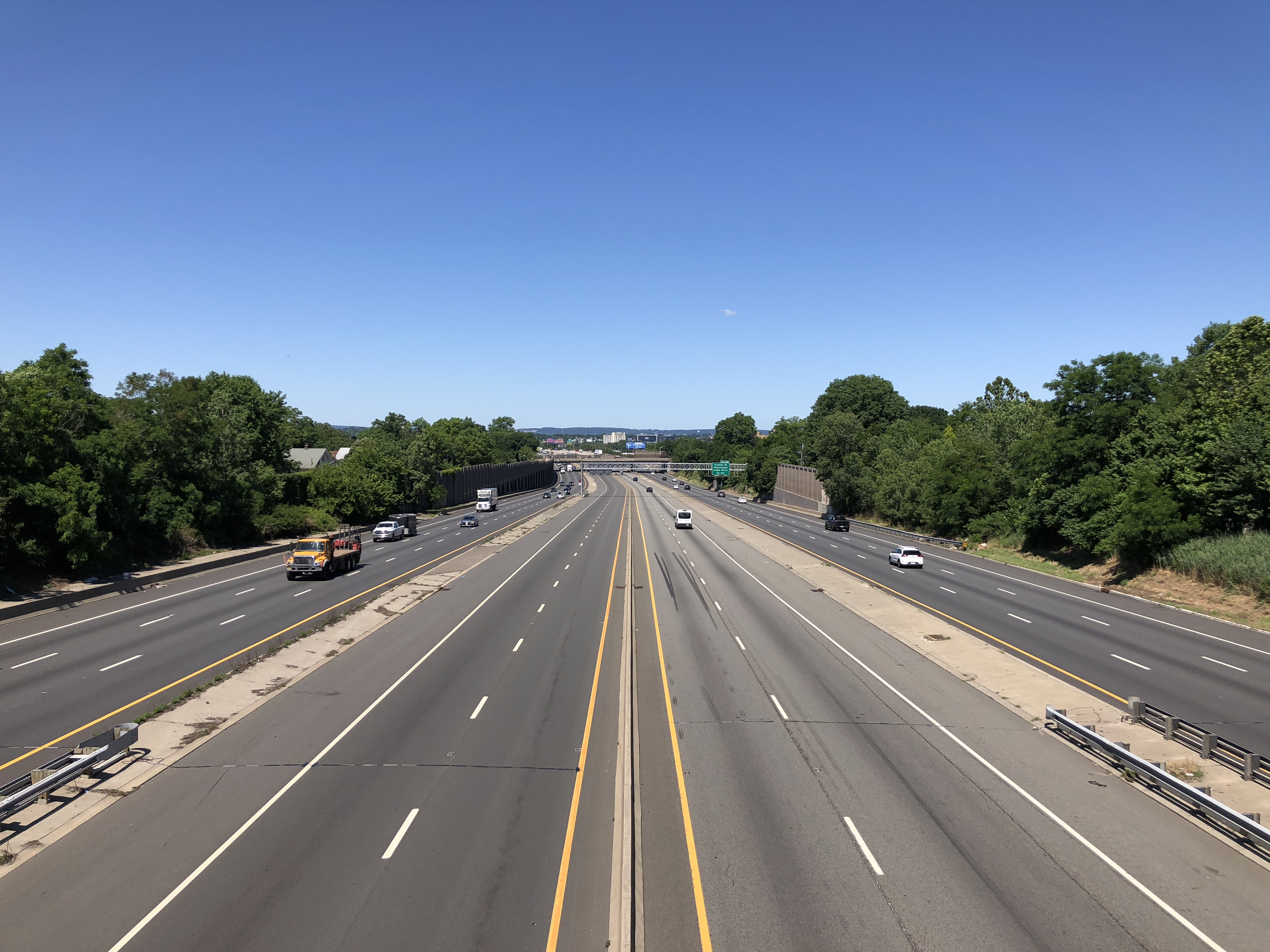
Interstate 80 westbound in Bogota

=== Roads and highways ===
As of May 2010, the borough had a total of 17.67 miles (28.44 km) of roadways, of which 14.90 miles (23.98 km) were maintained by the municipality, 2.39 miles (3.85 km) by Bergen County and 0.38 miles (0.61 km) by the New Jersey Department of Transportation.

Interstate 80 passes through the southern tip of the borough, continuing from Ridgefield Park in the west onto its terminus in Teaneck to the east, and is accessible at Exit 67 in Ridgefield Park, just south of Bogota. Route 4 is accessible in Teaneck. These highways provide access to the George Washington Bridge, the New Jersey Turnpike, the Garden State Parkway and other portions of the area's transportation network. There are several bridges, including the Court Street Bridge and the Midtown Bridge that span the Hackensack River to Hackensack. Bergen County CR 56-1, whose terminus is within the borough, CR 56-2, and CR 41 all pass through Bogota.

=== Public transportation ===
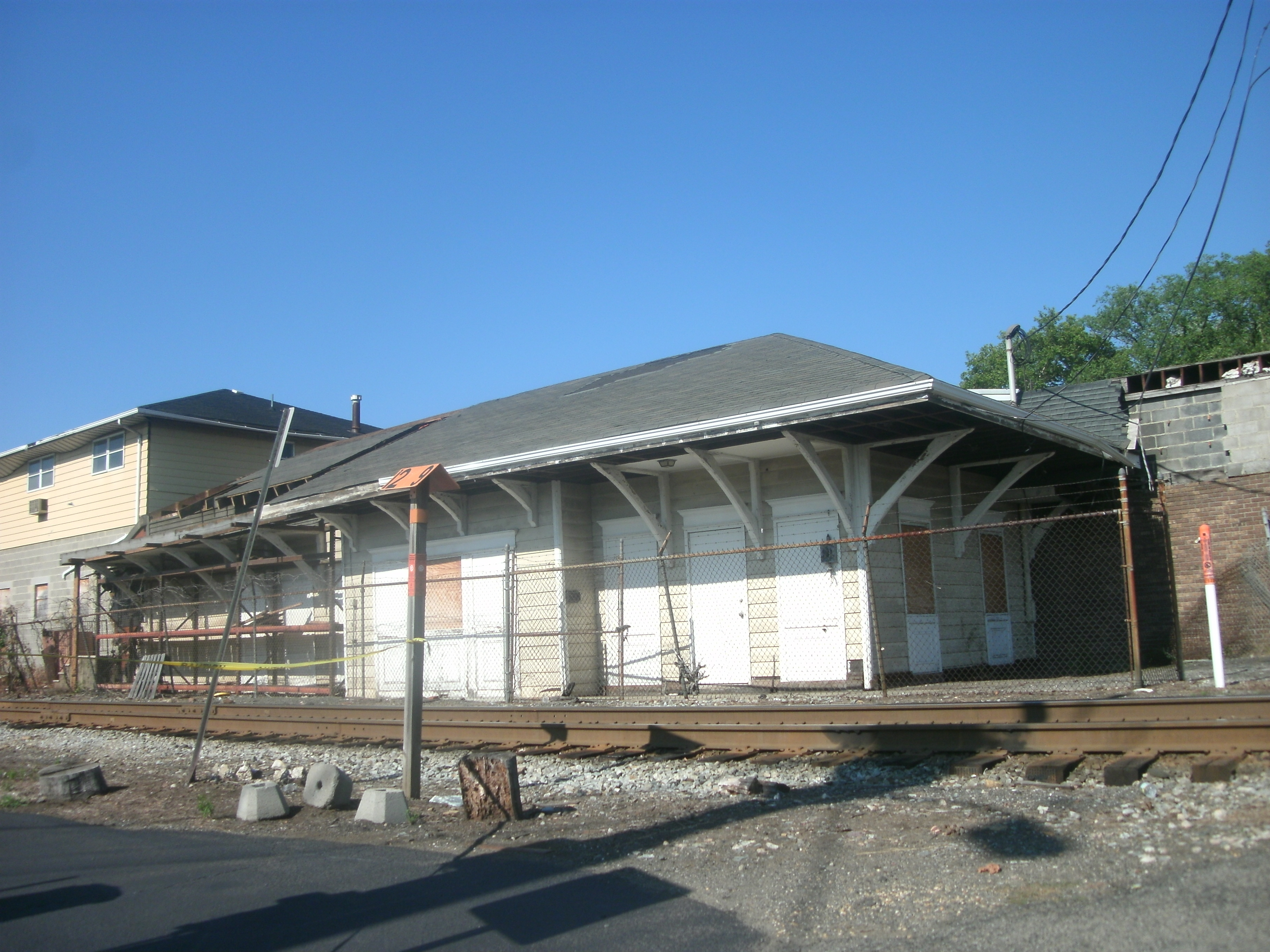
Former Bogota station, as seen in 2011, integrated into a larger building

Several NJ Transit bus lines travel through Bogota between Hackensack, Jersey City, Paramus and New York City. NJ Transit bus service is available to and from the Port Authority Bus Terminal in Midtown Manhattan on the 155 and 168 routes; to the George Washington Bridge Bus Station on the 182 route; and to other New Jersey communities served on the 83 (to Jersey City), 751 and 755 routes.

Passenger rail service to Bogota station ended in 1966, but the right of way for freight lines of New York, Susquehanna and Western Railroad (NYSW) and the CSX River Subdivision (formerly the West Shore Railroad) run along the riverbank on the west side of town. The Passaic–Bergen–Hudson Transit Project is a NJ Transit proposal to restore passenger service along the rail corridor with potential stations at West Fort Lee Road and Central Avenue.

== Popular culture ==
The 2005 documentary film Anytown, USA focused on the 2003 mayoral race between Republican Steve Lonegan, Democrat Fred Pesce and independent Dave Musikant. The film was screened at the Minneapolis-St. Paul International Film Festival on April 9, 2005, where it won the award for Best Documentary.

== Notable people ==
People who were born in, residents of, or otherwise closely associated with Bogota include:

- Eddie Adams (1933–2004), photographer and photojournalist who won a Pulitzer Prize in 1969 for his photo of police chief General Nguyễn Ngọc Loan executing a Vietcong prisoner, Nguyễn Văn Lém, on a Saigon street
- Jimmy Gnecco (born 1973), musician from the Ours
- Beth Hall (born 1958), actress best known for her portrayal of Wendy Harris on the CBS sitcom Mom
- Richie Incognito (born 1983), guard for the Buffalo Bills of the National Football League
- Steve Lonegan (born 1956), politician who served for 12 years as Mayor of Bogota, was candidate for Governor of New Jersey in 2005 and 2009, and was the 2013 U.S. Senate candidate in the election following the death of Frank Lautenberg
- Norman Pittenger (1905–1997), Anglican theologian who was one of the first acknowledged Christian defenders for the open acceptance of homosexual relations among Christians
- Stanley Foster Reed (1917–2007), entrepreneur
- Sid Schacht (1918–1991), pitcher who appeared in 19 games in the Major Leagues for the St. Louis Browns (1950–1951) and Boston Braves (1951)
- Pat Schuber (born 1947), politician who served for four years as Mayor of Bogota, represented the district in the New Jersey General Assembly from 1982 to 1990 and served 12 years as the County Executive of Bergen County.
- Vin Scully (1927-2022), sportscaster for the Los Angeles Dodgers
- Harvey Silverglate (born 1942), attorney, journalist, writer, and co-founder of the Foundation for Individual Rights in Education
- Pat Sullivan (born 1971), assistant coach for the New York Knicks
- Andy Unanue (born 1967), businessman and investor
- Al Yates (1945–2007), outfielder who played in Major League Baseball for the Milwaukee Brewers

== Sources ==
- Municipal Incorporations of the State of New Jersey (according to Counties) prepared by the Division of Local Government, Department of the Treasury (New Jersey); December 1, 1958.
- Clayton, W. Woodford; and Nelson, Nelson. History of Bergen and Passaic Counties, New Jersey, with Biographical Sketches of Many of its Pioneers and Prominent Men. Philadelphia: Everts and Peck, 1882.
- Harvey, Cornelius Burnham (ed.), Genealogical History of Hudson and Bergen Counties, New Jersey. New York: New Jersey Genealogical Publishing Co., 1900.
- Van Valen, James M. History of Bergen County, New Jersey. New York: New Jersey Publishing and Engraving Co., 1900.
- Westervelt, Frances A. (Frances Augusta), 1858–1942, History of Bergen County, New Jersey, 1630–1923, Lewis Historical Publishing Company, 1923.
