= APRA =

APRA or Apra may refer to:

== Places ==
- Apra, Punjab, a census town city in Jalandhar District of Punjab, India
- Apra Harbor, the main port of Guam

== Acronyms ==
- American Popular Revolutionary Alliance (Alianza Popular Revolucionaria Americana), a Peruvian political party
- Association for Peace and Reconciliation in Araucanía (Asociación para la Paz y la Reconciliación en La Araucanía), a Chilean political movement
- American Privacy Rights Act, proposed data privacy legislation in the United States
- Apra (foundation), an Abkhazian political organization
- APRA AMCOS, comprising the Australasian Performing Right Association and Australasian Mechanical Copyright Owners Society
- APRA Awards (Australia), Australian music awards
- APRA Awards (New Zealand), New Zealand music awards
- Australian Professional Rodeo Association
- Australian Prudential Regulation Authority
- Legion of the Just Ruler, or Angkatan Perang Ratu Adil, a pro-Dutch militia and private army established during the Indonesian National Revolution
- Pontifical Athenaeum Regina Apostolorum (Ateneo Pontificio Regina Apostolorum), a university in Rome
