= Electoral history of Frank Pallone =

American political record

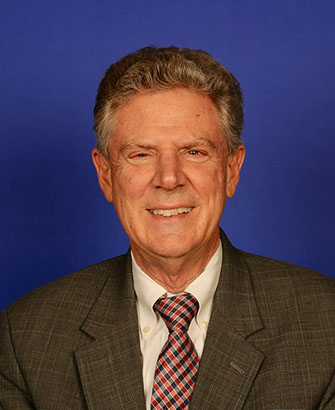
Official portrait, 2018.

Frank Pallone is an American politician from New Jersey who is currently serving in the U.S. House of Representatives since 1988. He served New Jersey's 3rd congressional district from 1988 to 1993, and New Jersey's 6th congressional district since 1993. He previously served in the New Jersey Senate, where he served one full term and one partial term. He resigned from the Senate early after winning a special congressional election in 1988.

== New Jersey Senate ==
1983 New Jersey Senate 11th district election
Primary election
Party	Candidate	Votes	%
Democratic	Frank Pallone	3,352	90.6
Democratic	Dorothy J. Eaton	347	9.4
Total votes		3,699	100.0
General election
Democratic	Frank Pallone	24,339	50.4
Republican	Brian T. Kennedy (incumbent)	23,412	48.5
Bull Moose Party	Edgar Van Houten	508	1.1
Total votes		48,259	100.0
Democratic gain from Republican			

1987 New Jersey Senate 11th district election
Primary election
Party	Candidate	Votes	%
Democratic	Frank Pallone (incumbent)	2,765	100.0
Total votes		2,765	100.0
General election
Democratic	Frank Pallone (incumbent)	28,223	60.1
Republican	Gerri Chappell Popkin	18,751	39.9
Total votes		46,974	100.0
Democratic hold			

== U.S. House of Representatives ==
=== 1980s ===
1988 New Jersey's 3rd congressional district special election (Note: For the 1988 special and regular elections, the primary and general elections occurred concurrently. Pallone took office shortly after the general elections in November 1988.)
Primary election
Party	Candidate	Votes	%
Democratic	Frank Pallone	22,198	100.0
Total votes		22,198	100.0
General election
Democratic	Frank Pallone	116,988	52.0
Republican	Joseph Azzolina	106,489	47.3
Libertarian	Laura Stewart	1,713	0.8
Total votes		225,190	100.0
Democratic gain from Republican			

1988 New Jersey's 3rd congressional district regular election
Primary election
Party	Candidate	Votes	%
Democratic	Frank Pallone	24,105	100.0
Total votes		24,105	100.0
General election
Democratic	Frank Pallone	117,024	51.6
Republican	Joseph Azzolina	107,479	47.4
Libertarian	Laura Stewart	2,107	0.9
Total votes		226,610	100.0
Democratic gain from Republican			

=== 1990s ===
1990 New Jersey's 3rd congressional district election
Primary election
Party	Candidate	Votes	%
Democratic	Frank Pallone (incumbent)	12,544	80.2
Democratic	Pat Daly	2,555	16.3
Democratic	Irwin Zucker	551	3.5
Total votes		15,650	100.0
General election
Democratic	Frank Pallone (incumbent)	77,866	49.1
Republican	Paul A. Kapalko	73,696	46.5
Independent	Richard D. McKean	4,377	2.8
Libertarian	William Stewart	1,833	1.2
Populist	Joseph A. Plonski	871	0.5
Total votes		158,643	100.0
Democratic hold			

1992 New Jersey's 6th congressional district election
Primary election
Party	Candidate	Votes	%
Democratic	Frank Pallone (incumbent)	19,087	54.6
Democratic	Bob Smith	12,769	36.6
Democratic	Barbara Jensen	1,789	5.1
Democratic	Jeffrey R. Gorman	1,286	3.7
Total votes		34,931	100.0
General election
Democratic	Frank Pallone (incumbent)	118,266	52.3
Republican	Joe Kyrillos	100,949	44.6
The People's Candidate	Joseph Spalletta	2,153	0.9
Libertarian	Bill Stewart	1,404	0.6
Independent for Freedom	Peter Cerrato	1,073	0.5
You Gotta Believe	George P. Predham	951	0.4
Socialist Workers	Simone Berg	631	0.3
America First Populist	Kenneth Matto	411	0.2
Capitalist	Charles H. Dickson	273	0.1
Total votes		226,111	100.0
Democratic hold			

1994 New Jersey's 6th congressional district election
Primary election
Party	Candidate	Votes	%
Democratic	Frank Pallone (incumbent)	12,700	100.0
Total votes		12,700	100.0
General election
Democratic	Frank Pallone (incumbent)	88,922	60.4
Republican	Mike Herson	55,287	37.5
Capitalist	Charles H. Dickson	1,774	1.2
Conservative	Gary J. Rich	800	0.5
Natural Law	Richard Quinn	548	0.4
Total votes		147,331	100.0
Democratic hold			

1996 New Jersey's 6th congressional district election
Primary election
Party	Candidate	Votes	%
Democratic	Frank Pallone (incumbent)	13,817	100.0
Total votes		13,817	100.0
General election
Democratic	Frank Pallone (incumbent)	160,415	76.3
Republican	Steven J. Corodmas	44,286	21.1
Independent	Keith Quarles	2,044	1.0
Independent	Richard Sorrentino	1,509	0.7
Independent	Susan H. Normandin	1,247	0.6
Independent	Stefanie C. Trick	641	0.3
Total votes		210,142	100.0
Democratic hold			

1998 New Jersey's 6th congressional district election
Primary election
Party	Candidate	Votes	%
Democratic	Frank Pallone (incumbent)	9,918	100.0
Total votes		9,918	100.0
General election
Democratic	Frank Pallone (incumbent)	78,102	57.0
Republican	Michael Ferguson	55,180	40.3
Independent	Carl J. Mayer	1,291	0.9
Independent	Steve Nagle	1,262	0.9
Independent	Leonard P. Marshall	1,177	0.9
Total votes		137,012	100.0
Democratic hold			

=== 2000s ===
2000 New Jersey's 6th congressional district election
Primary election
Party	Candidate	Votes	%
Democratic	Frank Pallone (incumbent)	24,475	100.0
Total votes		24,475	100.0
General election
Democratic	Frank Pallone (incumbent)	141,698	67.5
Republican	Brian T. Kennedy	62,454	29.8
Green	Earl Gray	4,252	2.0
Reform	Karen Zaletel	1,120	0.5
Conservative	Sylvia Kuzmak	328	0.2
Total votes		209,852	100.0
Democratic hold			

2002 New Jersey's 6th congressional district election
Primary election
Party	Candidate	Votes	%
Democratic	Frank Pallone (incumbent)	11,005	100.0
Total votes		11,005	100.0
General election
Democratic	Frank Pallone (incumbent)	91,379	66.5
Republican	Brian T. Kennedy	42,479	30.9
Green	Richard D. Strong	1,819	1.3
Libertarian	Barry Allen	1,206	0.9
Human Rights Advocate	Mac Dara Francis X. Lyden	612	0.4
Total votes		137,495	100.0
Democratic hold			

2004 New Jersey's 6th congressional district election
Primary election
Party	Candidate	Votes	%
Democratic	Frank Pallone (incumbent)	14,382	100.0
Total votes		14,382	100.0
General election
Democratic	Frank Pallone (incumbent)	153,981	66.9
Republican	Sylvester Fernandez	70,942	30.8
Libertarian	Virginia A. Flynn	2,829	1.2
Independent	Mac Dara F.X. Lyden	2,399	1.0
Total votes		230,151	100.0
Democratic hold			

2006 New Jersey's 6th congressional district election
Primary election
Party	Candidate	Votes	%
Democratic	Frank Pallone (incumbent)	10,934	100.0
Total votes		10,934	100.0
General election
Democratic	Frank Pallone (incumbent)	98,615	68.6
Republican	Leigh-Ann Bellew	43,539	30.3
Diversity Is Strength	Herbert L. Tarbous	1,619	1.1
Total votes		143,773	100.0
Democratic hold			

2008 New Jersey's 6th congressional district election
Primary election
Party	Candidate	Votes	%
Democratic	Frank Pallone (incumbent)	18,609	100.0
Total votes		18,609	100.0
General election
Democratic	Frank Pallone (incumbent)	164,077	66.9
Republican	Robert E. McLeod	77,469	31.6
Independent	Herb Tarbous	3,531	1.4
Total votes		245,077	100.0
Democratic hold			

=== 2010s ===
2010 New Jersey's 6th congressional district election
Primary election
Party	Candidate	Votes	%
Democratic	Frank Pallone (incumbent)	18,609	100.0
Total votes		18,609	100.0
General election
Democratic	Frank Pallone (incumbent)	81,933	54.7
Republican	Anna C. Little	65,413	43.7
Independent	Jack Freudenheim	1,299	0.9
Green Tea Patriots	Karen Anne Zaletel	1,017	0.7
Total votes		149,662	100.0
Democratic hold			

2012 New Jersey's 6th congressional district election
Primary election
Party	Candidate	Votes	%
Democratic	Frank Pallone (incumbent)	16,593	100.0
Total votes		16,593	100.0
General election
Democratic	Frank Pallone (incumbent)	151,782	63.3
Republican	Anna Little	84,360	35.2
Libertarian	Len Flynn	1,392	0.6
Overthrow All Incumbents	Karen Zaletel	868	0.4
Independent	Mac Dara Lyden	830	0.3
Independent	Herbert L. Tarbous	406	0.2
Total votes		239,638	100.0
Democratic hold			

2014 New Jersey's 6th congressional district election
Primary election
Party	Candidate	Votes	%
Democratic	Frank Pallone (incumbent)	11,358	100.0
Total votes		11,358	100.0
General election
Democratic	Frank Pallone (incumbent)	72,190	59.9
Republican	Anthony E. Wilkinson	46,891	38.9
Libertarian	Dorit Goikhman	1,376	1.1
Total votes		120,457	100.0
Democratic hold			

2016 New Jersey's 6th congressional district election
Primary election
Party	Candidate	Votes	%
Democratic	Frank Pallone (incumbent)	52,231	100.0
Total votes		52,231	100.0
General election
Democratic	Frank Pallone (incumbent)	167,895	63.7
Republican	Brent Sonnek-Schmelz	91,908	34.9
Green	Rajit B. Malliah	1,912	0.7
Libertarian	Judith Shamy	1,720	0.7
Total votes		263,435	100.0
Democratic hold			

2018 New Jersey's 6th congressional district election
Primary election
Party	Candidate	Votes	%
Democratic	Frank Pallone (incumbent)	23,621	86.2
Democratic	Javahn Walker	3,770	13.8
Total votes		27,391	100.0
General election
Democratic	Frank Pallone (incumbent)	140,752	63.6
Republican	Richard J. Pezullo	80,443	36.7
Total votes		221,195	100.0
Democratic hold			

=== 2020s ===
2020 New Jersey's 6th congressional district election
Primary election
Party	Candidate	Votes	%
Democratic	Frank Pallone (incumbent)	56,660	79.2
Democratic	Russell Cirincoine	12,139	17.0
Democratic	Amani Al-Khatahtbeh	2,743	3.8
Total votes		71,542	100.0
General election
Democratic	Frank Pallone (incumbent)	199,648	61.7
Republican	Christian Onuoha	126,760	38.3
Total votes		326,408	100.0
Democratic hold			

2022 New Jersey's 6th congressional district election
Primary election
Party	Candidate	Votes	%
Democratic	Frank Pallone (incumbent)	30,534	100.0
Total votes		30,534	100.0
General election
Democratic	Frank Pallone (incumbent)	106,238	57.5
Republican	Susan M. Kiley	75,839	41.0
Libertarian	Tara Fisher	1,361	0.7
New Jersey First	Inder Jit Soni	947	0.5
Move Everyone Forward	Eric Antisell	534	0.3
Total votes		184,919	100.0
Democratic hold			

2024 New Jersey's 6th congressional district election
Primary election
Party	Candidate	Votes	%
Democratic	Frank Pallone (incumbent)	36,649	84.0
Democratic	John Hsu	6,992	16.0
Total votes		43,641	100.0
General election
Democratic	Frank Pallone (incumbent)	170,275	56.1
Republican	Scott Fegler	122,519	40.3
Common Sense Independent	Fahad Akhtar	4,871	1.6
Green	Herb Tarbous	4,246	1.4
Libertarian	Matthew Amitrano	1,770	0.6
Total votes		303,681	100.0
Democratic hold			
