= New Jersey Data Privacy Act =

Consumer privacy law in New Jersey

New Jersey Legislature
- Long title: An Act concerning online services, consumers, and personal data and supplementing Title 56 of the Revised Statutes.
- Citation: P.L. 2023, c. 266
- Territorial extent: New Jersey
- Passed by: New Jersey Senate
- Passed: January 8, 2024
- Passed by: New Jersey General Assembly
- Passed: January 8, 2024
- Signed by: Governor Phil Murphy
- Signed: January 16, 2024
- Effective: January 15, 2025

Legislative history

Initiating chamber: New Jersey Senate
- Bill title: Senate Bill 332
- Status: Amended

The New Jersey Data Privacy Act (NJDPA) is a consumer privacy law in New Jersey. It gives residents rights to access, correct, and delete their personal data and to opt out of data sales and targeted advertising. Governor Phil Murphy signed it on January 16, 2024, and it took effect on January 15, 2025.

== Legislative history ==
Lawmakers expanded Senate Bill 332 from an opt-out bill into a comprehensive privacy bill during the final weeks of the 2022–2023 legislative session. On January 8, 2024, the Senate approved it 21–14 and the General Assembly approved it 46–27.

Assembly sponsor Raj Mukherji said state legislation was needed because the United States lacked a comprehensive federal privacy law. The New Jersey Business & Industry Association opposed the bill, citing compliance costs, differences from other states' laws, and amendments made late in the session. Mukherji said the amendments strengthened consumer protections.

== Provisions ==
=== Coverage ===
The act covers businesses and organizations that do business in New Jersey or market products or services to its residents and, during a calendar year, either:

- control or process the personal data of at least 100,000 New Jersey consumers, excluding data used only to complete payment transactions; or
- control or process the personal data of at least 25,000 New Jersey consumers and receive revenue or discounts from data sales.

The act defines consumers as residents acting in a personal or household capacity. It excludes employment and commercial relationships. State agencies and financial institutions regulated under the Gramm–Leach–Bliley Act are exempt, as is health information protected by the Health Insurance Portability and Accountability Act.

=== Consumer rights ===
Consumers can obtain copies of their data in a portable format, correct inaccuracies, and request deletion. They can opt out of data sales, targeted advertising, and automated profiling used in decisions about loans, housing, employment, and health care. Businesses must respond to verified requests within 45 days, with another 45 days allowed when the number or complexity of requests requires it. They must also provide an appeal process.

Businesses must honor automatic opt-out signals for data sales and targeted advertising. This requirement took effect on July 15, 2025.

=== Data handling ===
Privacy notices must explain what data is collected, why it is collected, and the types of third parties receiving it. The act limits collection to data needed for the disclosed purposes and requires contracts with outside data processors. Businesses must document the privacy risks of data sales and processing sensitive data.

The act classifies health information, religious beliefs, sexual orientation, immigration status, precise location, and financial account details paired with access credentials as sensitive data. Processing this data requires consent. Data about children under 13 must be handled in accordance with the federal Children's Online Privacy Protection Act. Businesses that know, or willfully disregard, that a consumer is aged 13 to 16 must obtain consent for data sales, targeted advertising, and profiling used in credit, housing, employment, or health care decisions.

== Enforcement ==
The New Jersey Attorney General enforces the act, which provides no private right of action. Until July 1, 2026, businesses had 30 days to correct alleged violations when the Division of Consumer Affairs considered correction possible. Violations are punishable under the state's Consumer Fraud Act, with civil penalties of up to $10,000 for a first offense and $20,000 for later offenses.

== Regulations ==
The Division of Consumer Affairs proposed regulations on June 2, 2025. Technology and advertising trade groups asked it to narrow the proposed definition of a data broker. The proposal expired on June 2, 2026, without being adopted.

== Amendments ==
Murphy signed an amendment on January 20, 2026, exempting insurance-support organizations and national securities associations. It extended the health information exemption to information given HIPAA privacy and security protections and added an exemption for research conducted under International Council for Harmonisation good clinical practice guidelines. It also recognized HIPAA de-identification standards when recipients are contractually barred from re-identifying the data.

On June 30, 2026, Governor Mikie Sherrill signed legislation banning sales of sensitive data. It also required a public registry of data brokers and data collectors, established annual registration fees, and imposed a $50,000-per-record penalty for prohibited sales of sensitive data.

== See also ==
- California Consumer Privacy Act
- Colorado Privacy Act
- State privacy laws of the United States
