= Wilcher =

Wilcher is a surname shared by several notable people:

- Geneice Wilcher (born 1980), American beauty pageant titlist
- Mike Wilcher (born 1960), retired American professional football player
- Phillip Wilcher (born 1958), Australian pianist and composer
- Thomas Wilcher (born 1964), American collegiate and pre-collegiate champion track and field athlete
