= Data minimization =

Processing only necessary personal information

Data minimization is the principle of collecting, processing and storing only the necessary amount of personal information required for a specific purpose. The principle emanates from the realisation that processing unnecessary data is creating unnecessary risks for the data subject without creating any current benefit or value. The risks of processing personal data vary from identity theft to unreliable inferences resulting in incorrect, wrongful and potentially dangerous decisions.

The principle of data minimization is a global, universal principle of data protection, and can thus be found in almost every legal or regulatory text on data protection/privacy.

== Principle in regulatory texts ==
=== Global ===
The OECD Privacy Guidelines refer to the data minimization principle as the Collection Limitation Principle (part two, article 7).

=== Europe ===
The data minimization principle is the second of the six fundamental privacy principles set forth in the General Data Protection Regulation and the UK GDPR.

The Swiss Federal Law on Federal Act on Data Protection (FADP) includes data minimisation as an aspect of data protection by design and data protection by default.

=== Asia ===
The APEC Privacy Framework includes the data minimization principle, referred to as the Collection Limitation principle, as principle III.

=== North America ===
==== Canada ====
The Canadian Personal Information Protection and Electronic Documents Act (PIPEDA) includes the principle as Principle 4 - Limiting Collection.

==== United States ====
The American Data Privacy and Protection Act (ADPPA), a United States proposed federal online privacy bill that was not enacted, included data minimisation as a main principle. Since the ADPPA, data minimization has become a highly contested issue in U.S. state privacy legislation, culminating in the Maryland Online Data Privacy Act (MODPA) including ADPPA-inspired data minimization requirements in 2024.

The American Privacy Rights Act (APRA), a comprehensive data privacy law proposed in April 2024 in the United States, includes a section on data minimisation.

In healthcare, the Health Insurance Portability and Accountability Act (HIPAA) Privacy Rule incorporates data minimization through its minimum necessary standard, which requires covered entities to limit uses and disclosures of protected health information to the minimum amount needed for the intended purpose.
