= Alicia Kozakiewicz =

American kidnapping survivor and advocate (born 1988)

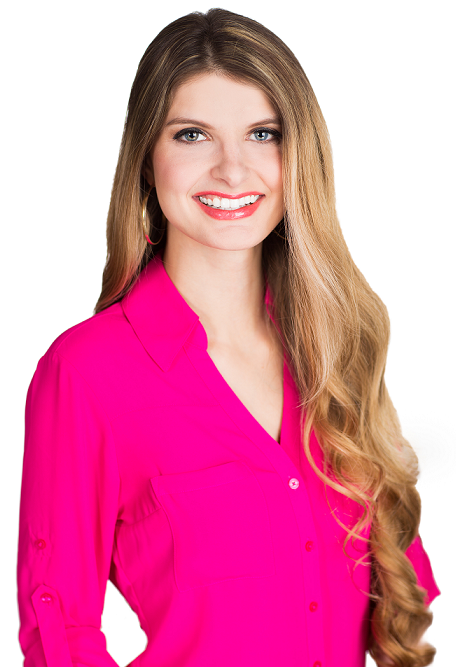
- Kozakiewicz in 2015.
- Born: March 23, 1988 (age 38); Pittsburgh, Pennsylvania, U.S.
- Other name: Alicia Kozak
- Education: Point Park University (BA); Chicago School of Professional Psychology (MA)
- Occupations: Child welfare activist, motivational speaker and television personality
- Website: aliciakozak.com

Alicia Kozakiewicz (/əˈliːʃə ˌkoʊzəˈkɛvɪtʃ/ ə-LEE-shə KOH-zə-KEV-ich;), also known as Alicia Kozak (born March 23, 1988), is an American television personality, motivational speaker, and advocate for Internet safety and missing persons. Kozakiewicz is the founder of the Alicia Project, an advocacy group designed to raise awareness about online predators, abduction, and child sexual exploitation. She is also the namesake of "Alicia's Law", which provides a dedicated revenue source for child rescue efforts. Kozakiewicz has worked with television network Investigation Discovery (ID) to educate the public on, and effect change for, issues such as Internet safety, missing people, human trafficking, and child safety awareness education.

At the age of 13 in 2002, Kozakiewicz became the first known victim of child abduction via Internet luring that received widespread media attention. Her story and message have been chronicled on The Oprah Winfrey Show, Good Morning America, Dr. Phil, CNN, MSNBC, and the A&E Biography Channel. She has been the subject of an award-winning PBS Internet safety documentary, Alicia's Message: I'm Here to Save Your Life, as well as the Emmy award-winning Alicia's Story produced by Enough is Enough. Kozakiewicz has been featured in numerous national and international publications, such as People and Cosmopolitan.

Kozakiewicz has addressed the United States Congress on the issue of Internet safety for children and federal child rescue funding.

== Abduction ==
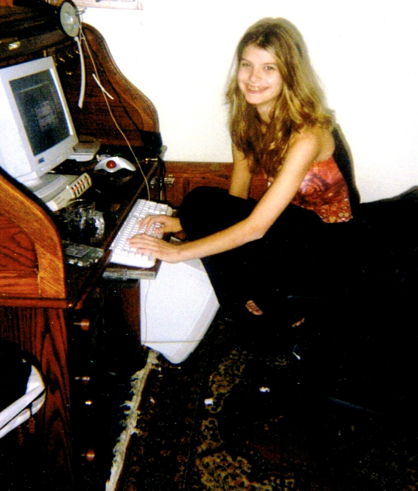
Alicia Kozakiewicz, age 13, sitting in front of her family computer

Kozakiewicz had corresponded online with someone she thought to be a girl named "Christine". She continued to do so even after learning that "Christine" was actually a 31-year-old man. That man then introduced her to Scott Tyree, a 38-year-old man who lived in Herndon, Virginia, via a Yahoo chat room. Over the course of nearly a year, Tyree groomed the 13-year-old Kozakiewicz. The Kozakiewicz family computer was located in the family room where Internet activity could be monitored, but Tyree often contacted her at night while the rest of the family was asleep.

On January 1, 2002, New Year's Day, Tyree lured Kozakiewicz into meeting him near her Pittsburgh, Pennsylvania, address. He coerced her into his vehicle and then drove her back to his home in Virginia. Over the course of four days, Tyree held her captive in a basement where he bound, raped and tortured her. Tyree filmed the abuse and broadcast it online for others to witness.

== Rescue ==
A viewer of Tyree’s videos who lived in Florida recognized Kozakiewicz from news stories and a missing persons flyer from the National Center for Missing & Exploited Children. He contacted the FBI, anonymously and via a payphone because he feared being charged as an accessory to the crime.

The FBI, using the Yahoo username they had learned from the anonymous tip, found Tyree's IP address and hence his street address, at a townhouse in Herndon. When FBI agents stormed the house on January 4, 2002, Kozakiewicz feared they were men Tyree had sent to kill her. At 4:10 pm on January 4, 2002, agents freed Kozakiewicz. Tyree was arrested half an hour later at his workplace in Herndon.

== Kidnapper ==
Kozakiewicz's kidnapper, Scott William Tyree, was born in 1963 to Erma Tyree. He graduated from Westmoor High School in 1981, was married twice and had a 12-year-old daughter (who was staying with him during winter break and had been sent back to her mother on the day Tyree kidnapped Kozakiewicz). He was divorced at the time of the kidnapping. His first wife, Sarah Tyree, said her husband was "a classic, long-haired computer guy" with an interest in science fiction and computer games. She said he had no prior brushes with the law.

== Aftermath ==
After her rescue, Kozakiewicz was examined at a hospital and released to the custody of Fairfax County Child Protective Services. Her parents, Mary and Charles Kozakiewicz, were unable to take a commercial flight to reunite with their daughter due to the heightened media attention. The FBI arranged a private flight the following day.

In the aftermath, Kozakiewicz developed post-traumatic stress disorder (PTSD) and significant memory loss. Much of her life leading up to the abduction is difficult or impossible for her to recall. She has used counseling as a treatment method. As an adult she said that in 2002 people found it impossible to understand how this had happened and how she had been groomed; they mostly blamed the victim, although some people were supportive.

In September 2003, Tyree was sentenced to 19 years and 7 months in federal prison. He was released in February 2019 from the Federal Correctional Complex, Butner and was assigned to a halfway house in Pittsburgh. Kozakiewicz, her family, and multiple members of Congress called for the Federal Bureau of Prisons to move him farther away from Kozakiewicz's family. On March 22, 2019, a judge ruled that Tyree should be relocated. The controversy became moot in October 2019, when Tyree was returned to prison for an additional two years for violating the terms of his parole by visiting pornographic sites. He was released from prison once more on September 22, 2021 but was arrested again in October 2025 and charged with counts of stalking and possession of child pornography. He was convicted in 2026 and is due to be sentenced in January 2027 .

== Advocacy ==
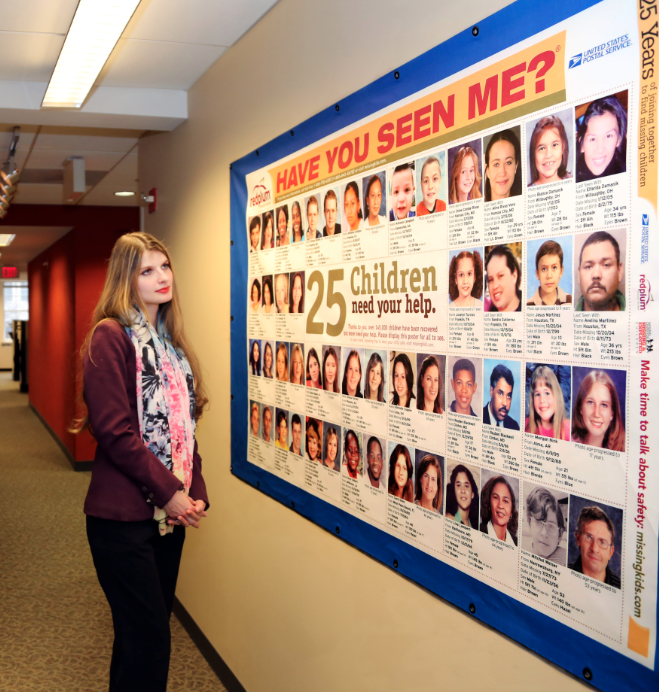
Alicia Kozakiewicz standing before a wall of missing children at the National Center for Missing and Exploited Children headquarters in Alexandria, Virginia.

One year after her abduction, at the age of 14, Kozakiewicz founded the Alicia Project. The Alicia Project is an advocacy group that raises awareness and provides education on topics such as Internet safety for children, the prevalence of online child predators, and abductions. Kozakiewicz has shared her story at numerous schools and conferences, despite acknowledging that speaking about the incident can be triggering.

In 2007, she testified before the House Judiciary Committee in an effort to raise awareness of the importance of Internet laws to protect children. She successfully lobbied for the passage of the Protect Our Children Act of 2008 and has been lobbying alongside PROTECT for the passage of Alicia's Law in state legislatures. Alicia's Law provides a stream of state-specific funding to the Internet Crimes Against Children task forces (ICAC). In some cases, state and local agencies are able to pull finances accumulated from misdemeanor and felony convictions, while others employ mechanisms such as unclaimed lottery funding. This money is used for training, task forces, research, and rescue efforts for law enforcement agencies seeking child sexual exploitation victims. Alicia's Law has been passed in 11 states, including Virginia, Texas, California, Hawaii, and Idaho. Kozakiewicz will advocate for its passage in all 50 states.

In 2018, it was reported that Alicia's Law had assisted in the arrest of over 1,000 online predators in Wisconsin alone. Additionally, Alicia's Law funding has enabled Wisconsin law enforcement to add a K-9 officer trained to locate hidden electronic devices. He was named "Kozak" in honor of Kozakiewicz. Kozak was involved in the search for Jayme Closs.

Kozakiewicz's work has been acknowledged by the National Center for Missing and Exploited Children who honored her with the Courage Award in 2007. She was also honored with a Jefferson Award for Public Service in 2009. Kozakiewicz has trained the FBI National Academy, offering insight as part of the "Youth Violence: Victims and Perpetrators" program. In 2013, Kozakiewicz joined the Distinguished Speaker Series at the Clinton School of Public Service. Her 2008 book, an OJJDP publication, You're Not Alone: The Journey From Abduction to Empowerment, is a survival guide for recovered abduction victims.

Recently teaming up with the Investigation Discovery network, Kozakiewicz provides insight on Internet safety and awareness. Currently, she is an Airline Ambassadors International Human Trafficking Awareness trainer and spokesperson, teaching airport personnel to recognize and report the signs of human trafficking.

Kozakiewicz has expressed concern about the American Data Privacy and Protection Act (a bill proposed in Congress in 2022) and its potential effect on law enforcement efforts to quickly investigate and solve child abduction cases. Although she supports the majority of the provisions in this bill, Kozakiewicz worries that "If the current version of the American Data Privacy and Protection Act had been in place when [she] was held captive, it may have been nearly impossible for law enforcement to find [her] and identify [her] captor as quickly as it did, if at all."

== Education ==
At the time of her abduction, Kozakiewicz was a student at Carlynton Junior/Senior High School. She earned a bachelor's degree in psychology at Point Park University. In 2016, Kozakiewicz graduated from Chicago School of Professional Psychology with a master's degree in forensic psychology.

== See also ==
- Elizabeth Smart
- List of kidnappings
- List of solved missing person cases: post–2000
