= Gabriella Miller Kids First Research Act =

United States federal law

- Long title: To eliminate taxpayer financing of presidential campaigns and party conventions and reprogram savings to provide for a 10-year pediatric research initiative through the Common Fund administered by the National Institutes of Health, and for other purposes.
- Announced in: the 113th United States Congress
- Sponsored by: Rep. Gregg Harper (R, MS-3)
- Number of co-sponsors: 152

Citations
- Public law: Pub. L. 113–94 (text) (PDF)

Codification
- Acts affected: Public Health Service Act, Internal Revenue Code of 1986
- U.S.C. sections affected: 42 U.S.C. § 282
- Agencies affected: National Institutes of Health

Legislative history
- Introduced in the House as H.R. 2019 by Rep. Gregg Harper (R, MS-3) on May 16, 2013; Committee consideration by United States House Committee on Energy and Commerce, United States House Committee on House Administration, United States House Committee on Ways and Means, United States House Energy Subcommittee on Health; Passed the House on December 11, 2013 (Roll Call Vote 632: 295-103); Passed the Senate on March 11, 2014 (Unanimous consent); Signed into law by President Barack Obama on April 3, 2014

The Gabriella Miller Kids First Research Act (H.R. 2019; Pub. L. 113–94 (text) (PDF)) is a law that ended taxpayer contributions to convention allocation portion of the Presidential Election Campaign Fund and authorized a pediatric research initiative through the National Institutes of Health. The total funding for research would come to $126 million over 10 years. At the time of its passage, national conventions drew about 23% of their funding from the Presidential Election Campaign Fund.

It became law during the 113th United States Congress and was extended through fiscal year 2028 by the 118th United States Congress in the Gabriella Miller Kids First Research Act 2.0. (H.R. 3391; Pub. L. 118–228 (text) (PDF))

== Background ==
Gabriella Miller of Leesburg, Virginia, was a girl who died of diffuse intrinsic pontine glioma, a rare form of brain cancer, on October 26, 2013, at the age of 10. While she was ill, she worked as an activist to raise support for research into childhood illnesses like cancer. Through her activism, she "raised hundreds of thousands of dollars for the Make-A-Wish Foundation and helped launch the Smashing Walnuts Foundation to fund pediatric cancer research." In a The Truth 365 documentary, Miller answered a question that what she would like to tell American leaders about research on pediatric cancer was that there needed to be "less talking, more doing... We need action." House Majority Leader Eric Cantor saw this video and decided to name the bill in her honor.

== Provisions of the bill ==
This summary is based largely on the summary provided by the Congressional Research Service, a public domain source.

The Gabriella Miller Kids First Research Act would amend the Internal Revenue Code to terminate the entitlement of any major or minor political party to a payment from the Presidential Election Campaign Fund for a presidential nominating convention. The bill transfers funds in each account maintained for the national committee of a party to a 10-Year Pediatric Research Initiative Fund, making them available only for allocation to national research institutes and national centers through the Common Fund for making grants for pediatric research under this Act.

The bill would amend the Public Health Service Act to require the Director of the National Institutes of Health (NIH), through the Division of Program Coordination, Planning, and Strategic Initiatives, to allocate funds appropriated under this Act to the national research institutes and national centers for making grants for pediatric research representing important areas of emerging scientific opportunities, rising public health challenges, or knowledge gaps that deserve special emphasis and would benefit from conducting or supporting additional research that involves collaboration between two or more national research institutes or national centers, or would otherwise benefit from strategic coordination and planning.

The bill would authorize $12.6 million out of the 10-Year Pediatric Research Initiative Fund for each of FY2014–FY2023 for pediatric research through the Common Fund. Requires such funds to supplement, not supplant, funds otherwise allocated by NIH for pediatric research. Prohibits the use of such amounts for any purpose other than allocating funds for making grants for pediatric research described in this Act.

== Congressional Budget Office report ==
This summary is based largely on the summary provided by the Congressional Budget Office, a public domain source.

H.R. 2019 would amend federal law to end the taxpayers' option to designate a portion of their federal income tax balance to the Presidential Election Campaign Fund and end the authority to spend funds on Presidential campaigns or conventions. The bill also would authorize the appropriation of $13 million a year over the 2014-2023 period for pediatric research.

== Procedural history ==
The Gabriella Miller Kids First Research Act was introduced into the United States House of Representatives on May 16, 2013, by Rep. Gregg Harper (R, MS-3). It was referred to the United States House Committee on Energy and Commerce, the United States House Committee on House Administration, the United States House Committee on Ways and Means, and the United States House Energy Subcommittee on Health. On December 11, 2013, the House voted in Roll Call Vote 632 to pass the bill 295–103. On March 11, 2014, the United States Senate passed the bill by unanimous consent. President Barack Obama signed the bill into law on April 3, 2014, as Pub. L. 113–94 (text) (PDF).

== Debate and discussion ==
According to Rep. Eric Cantor, the bill "clearly reflects Congressional priorities in funding: medical research before political parties and conventions."

102 House Democrats voted against the bill. The opposition, as stated in a Dear Colleague Letter, noted that the legislation had "completely bypassed the committee process," and therefore lacked the benefit of "discussion and debate as to what would be the most effective way of increasing financial support for pediatric biomedical research." Additional problems included the fact that the legislation "does not actually provide any additional funds to NIH. Rather, it specifies that the funds shall be available for NIH pediatric research "only to the extent and in such amounts as are provided in advance in appropriation Acts." The opposition also suggested that "perhaps this purely symbolic legislation is an effort to distract attention from the House Majority's actual record of support for biomedical research—a record which has been dismal in recent years." Rep. Frank Pallone Jr. (D-NJ) said that the bill was "a disingenuous and empty attempt by the Republicans to divert attention from the fact that they have voted to cut research time and time again."

Senator Minority Leader Mitch McConnell (R-KY) noted that "it's hard to imagine that there would be any objection to moving these funds to something we can all agree is a high priority—pediatric research."

The bill was opposed by some campaign finance reform groups who were skeptical that the money would actually be appropriated to the NIH.

== See also ==
- List of bills in the 113th United States Congress
- Presidential election campaign fund checkoff
- United States presidential nominating convention
