= Frank Pallone =

American lawyer and politician (born 1951)

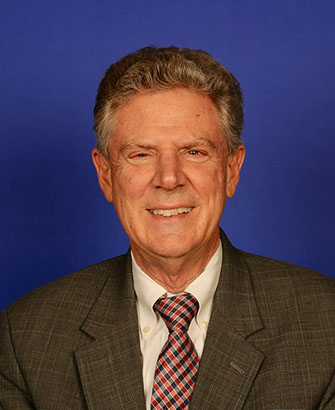
- Official portrait, 2018

Ranking Member of the House Energy and Commerce Committee
- Incumbent
- Assumed office January 3, 2023
- Preceded by: Cathy McMorris Rodgers
- In office January 3, 2015 – January 3, 2019
- Preceded by: Henry Waxman
- Succeeded by: Greg Walden

Chair of the House Energy and Commerce Committee
- In office January 3, 2019 – January 3, 2023
- Preceded by: Greg Walden
- Succeeded by: Cathy McMorris Rodgers

Member of the U.S. House of Representatives from New Jersey
- Incumbent
- Assumed office November 8, 1988 (Note: Pallone's official service begins on the date of the special election, while the House was adjourned sine die until the start of the next Congress on January 3, 1989.)
- Preceded by: James J. Howard
- Constituency: 3rd district (1988–1993); 6th district (1993–present)

Member of the New Jersey Senate from the 11th district
- In office January 10, 1984 – November 8, 1988
- Preceded by: Brian T. Kennedy
- Succeeded by: Joseph A. Palaia

Personal details
- Born: Frank Joseph Pallone Jr. October 30, 1951 (age 75) Long Branch, New Jersey, U.S.
- Party: Democratic
- Spouse: Sarah Hospodor (m. 1992)
- Children: 3
- Education: Middlebury College (BA); Tufts University (MA); Rutgers University, Camden (JD)
- Website: House website Campaign website
- Pallone's voice Pallone supporting the Protecting American Lungs and Reversing the Youth Tobacco Epidemic Act of 2019. Recorded February 28, 2020

Frank Joseph Pallone Jr. (/pəˈloʊn/ pə-LOHN; born October 30, 1951) is an American lawyer and politician serving as the U.S. representative for New Jersey's 6th congressional district since 1988. He is a member of the Democratic Party. The district, numbered as the 3rd district from 1988 to 1993, is in the north-central part of the state and includes New Brunswick, Woodbridge Township, Perth Amboy, Sayreville, Edison, Piscataway and Asbury Park. Pallone is the ranking member of the House Energy and Commerce Committee.

== Early life, education, and early political career ==
Pallone was born on October 30, 1951, at Long Branch, New Jersey, the son of Marian A. (De Santis) and Frank Joseph Pallone.

In 1969, he graduated from Long Branch High School.

He then earned a BA in 1973 at Middlebury College.

He then earned an MA at The Fletcher School of Law and Diplomacy at Tufts University in 1974.

He earned a JD at Rutgers in Camden in 1978.

Before being elected to the House, he was a member of the Long Branch City Council from 1982 to 1988.

Pallone was a member of the New Jersey Senate from the 11th district from 1984 to 1988. In 1983, he defeated incumbent Republican State Senator Brian T. Kennedy 50%-49%. In 1987, he was reelected with 60% of the vote, defeating Neptune City Councilwoman Gerri C. Popkin.

== U.S. House of Representatives ==
=== Elections ===
==== 1988–1990 ====
In March 1988, 60-year-old incumbent U.S. Congressman James Howard of New Jersey's 3rd congressional district died in office. In November, the regular election coincided with a special election to complete Howard's term; Pallone won both, defeating Republican former state Assemblyman Joe Azzolina 52% to 47% and Libertarian Laura Stewart. In 1990, he was reelected with 49% of the vote, against a Republican, an independent, Libertarian Bill Stewart, and a Populist.

==== 1992–2008 ====
After redistricting, Pallone's district was renumbered the 6th district. In the 1992 Democratic primary, he defeated State Representative Robert Smith 55% to 37%. In the general election, he defeated Republican State Senator Joe Kyrillos 52% to 45% and nine other candidates. Since then, he has won reelection with at least 60% in all but two elections (1998 and 2010). In 1998, he defeated Republican teacher Mike Ferguson 57% to 40%.

==== 2010 ====
Pallone was challenged by Republican nominee Anna C. Little, a former Monmouth County Freeholder and mayor of Highlands, New Jersey, who is an attorney specializing in immigration law. On November 3, 2010, Pallone defeated Little by over 16,000 votes, 55% to 43%, in what analysts considered a terrible year for Democrats. For the first time in his career, Pallone failed to carry his home county of Monmouth.

==== 2012 ====
Pallone ran for a thirteenth term and defeated Republican Anna Little in the general election, winning 63.3% of the vote.

==== 2014 ====
Pallone ran for a fourteenth term and defeated Republican Anthony E. Wilkinson in the general election, winning 60% of the vote.

==== 2016 ====
Pallone ran for a fifteenth term and defeated Republican Brent Sonnek-Schmelz in the general election, winning 63.7% of the vote.

==== 2018 ====
Pallone ran for a sixteenth term and defeated Republican Richard J. Pezzullo in the general election, winning 63.6% of the vote.

==== 2020 ====
Pallone ran for a seventeenth term and defeated Republican Christian Onuoha in the general election, winning 61.2% of the vote.

==== 2022 ====
Pallone ran for an eighteenth term and defeated Republican Sue Kiley in the general election, winning 57.5% of the vote.

==== 2024 ====
Pallone ran for a nineteenth term and defeated Republican Scott Fegler in the general election, winning 56% of the vote.

==== 2026 ====
Pallone ran for a twentieth term and defeated Republican Hillary Herzig in the general election, with the Associated Press calling the race in favor of Pallone at 8:06 p.m. on November 3, 2026.

=== Tenure ===
Pallone is a Progressive Caucus Member. He serves as Vice Chairman of the Native American Caucus, where he has worked on a bipartisan basis to protect the inherent sovereignty of tribal governments and promote the needs of Indian Country. As a senior member of the House Resources Committee—the committee with jurisdiction over all matters regarding U.S. relations with American Indians and Alaska Natives—he has been a defender of the sovereign status of Indian Tribal governments as independent from the United States.

He also serves as a co-chairman of the Congressional Caucus on Armenian Issues along with Congressman Ed Royce (previously Joe Knollenberg and Mark Kirk) and was instrumental in garnering the support of 127 members (30%) of the U.S. House for the Armenian Caucus. In 2002 he was awarded the Mkhitar Gosh Medal by the President of Armenia.

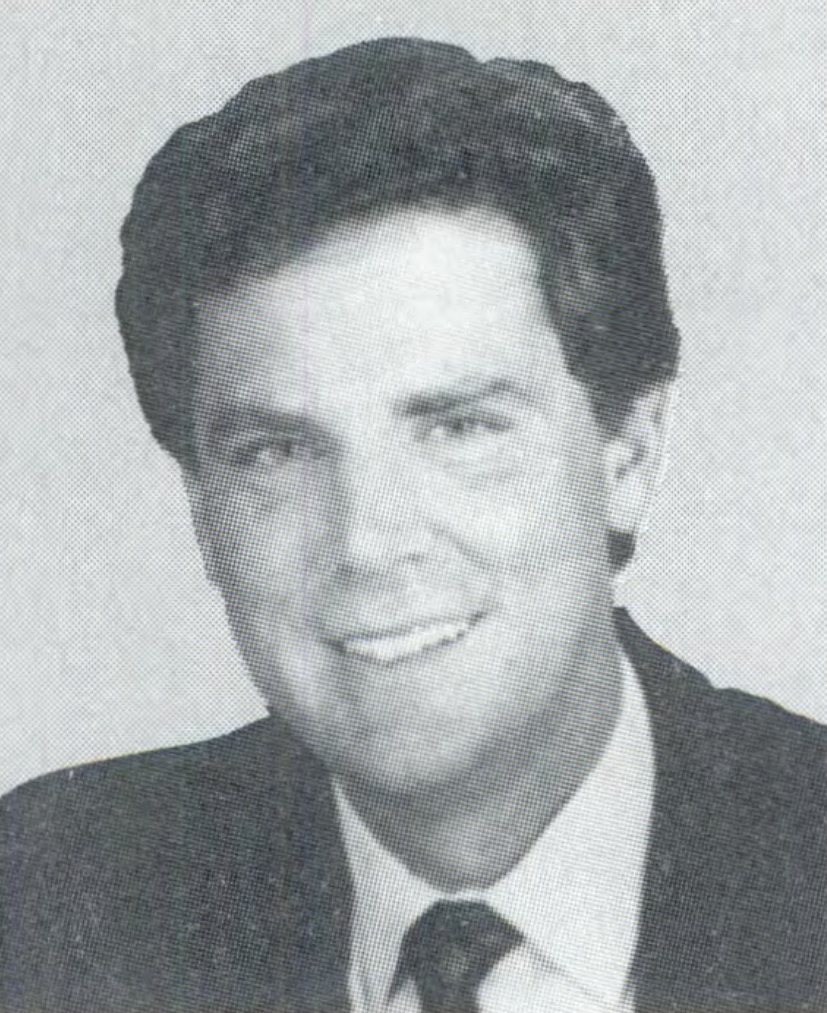
Pallone during the 100th Congress

In 2002, Pallone was awarded India's third highest civilian award, the Padma Bhushan, for his contributions as member of Congress's India Caucus. He also received the Friends of India Bollywood Movie Award in 2003.

Pallone was one of 31 House Democrats who voted not to count Ohio's electoral votes in the 2004 presidential election. Republican President George W. Bush won Ohio by 118,457 votes. Without Ohio's electoral votes, the election would have been decided by the U.S. House of Representatives, with each state having one vote in accordance with the Twelfth Amendment to the United States Constitution.

Pallone received an A on the Drum Major Institute's 2005 Congressional Scorecard on middle-class issues. while the National Taxpayers Union has consistently given Pallone an F ranking on votes that affect taxes, spending, and debt.

Pallone has questioned the Federal Emergency Management Agency (FEMA) on its update of flood plain maps in Monmouth County, specifically in the Bayshore area.

Pallone has introduced a bill to modify the Magnuson-Stevens Fishery Conservation and Management Act, the U.S.'s most important set of fisheries regulations.

On October 3, 2008, Pallone voted for the Troubled Asset Relief Program believing that the enumerated powers grant Congress the authority to "purchase assets and equity from financial institutions in order to strengthen its financial sector."

In 2014, Pallone defeated Representative Anna Eshoo 100 to 90 in a secret-ballot vote to becoming the ranking member of the Committee on Energy and Commerce. He had been the third-ranking Democrat, and was in line to becoming ranking member after the 2014 midterm elections due to the retirements of John Dingell and Henry Waxman. Pallone was backed by Minority Whip Steny Hoyer and the Congressional Black Caucus, the latter of which "made a repeated point to stress the importance of Pallone’s seniority. Black lawmakers have a deep appreciation for seniority, as it was historically the quickest way African-American members earned gavels". House Minority Leader Nancy Pelosi aggressively campaigned on Eshoo's behalf, while the Steering Committee, packed with Pelosi allies, recommended Eshoo for the ranking slot by 30 to 19 votes.

After Representative Chris Smith said he did "not construe homosexual rights as human rights", Pallone issued a statement supporting homosexual rights. The statement read, in part, "Representatives in Congress must be promoting the expansion of human rights, not fighting to limit its definition to people that they deem to be appropriate."

In 2024, Pallone was one of 16 Democratic representatives to vote to undo President Biden's pause of some weapons shipments to Israel amid a humanitarian crisis in Gaza. In January 2025, Pallone joined 44 other Democratic and 198 Republican representatives to pass the Illegitimate Court Counteraction Act. The Act, in response to the International Criminal Court (ICC) issuing warrants for Israeli officials, would impose sanctions on ICC officials who attempt to investigate, arrest, detain, or prosecute any protected person of the U.S. or its allies.

==== Syria ====
In 2023, Pallone was among 56 Democrats and the only representative from New Jersey to vote in favor of H.Con.Res. 21, which directed President Joe Biden to remove U.S. troops from Syria within 180 days. The resolution did not pass.

=== Legislation ===
Pallone opposed the Gabriella Miller Kids First Research Act (H.R. 2019; 113th Congress), which passed in both the House and the Senate. The bill would end taxpayer contributions to the Presidential Election Campaign Fund and divert the money in that fund to pay for research into pediatric cancer through the National Institutes of Health. The total funding for research would come to $126 million over 10 years. As of 2014, the national conventions got about 23% of their funding from the Presidential Election Campaign Fund. Pallone said the bill was "a disingenuous and empty attempt by the Republicans to divert attention from the fact that they have voted to cut research time and time again." Democratic opponents blamed Republicans for $1.5 billion cuts to the National Institutes of Health and said this money would not make it up. Supporters of the bill argued that the use of this money for pediatric cancer research was better than using it for political campaigns, so the bill should be supported for that reason. Pallone was one of 58 members of Congress to oppose tabling a motion offering articles of impeachment against Donald Trump on December 6, 2017.

While chair of the House Energy and Commerce Committee, Pallone sponsored the American Data Privacy and Protection Act (ADPPA), which became the first online privacy bill to pass committee markup.

=== Committee assignments ===
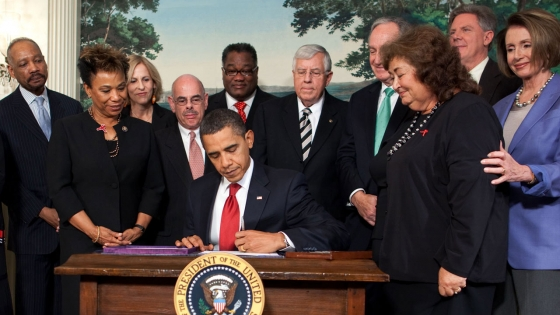
Frank Pallone beside President Obama who signs the Ryan White HIV/AIDS Treatment Extension Act of 2009.

- Committee on Energy and Commerce (ranking member)
  - As Ranking Member, Pallone is entitled to serve as an ex officio member of each subcommittee.

=== Select caucus memberships ===
- Congressional Arts Caucus
- Congressional Sri Lanka Caucus (founding member)
- Congressional Caucus on Armenian Issues (co-chair)
- Bipartisan Coalition for Combating Antisemitism
- Congressional Progressive Caucus
- Democratic Israel Working Group
- LGBTQ+ Equality Caucus
- Congressional Coalition on Adoption
- Congressional Taiwan Caucus
- Congressional Ukraine Caucus
- Congressional Wildlife Refuge Caucus
- Rare Disease Caucus

== Other political offices ==
In 2002, Pallone turned down an offer to replace embattled Senator Bob Torricelli as the Democratic nominee for U.S. Senate by Democratic Party leaders. The slot eventually went to Frank Lautenberg, who won the general election. In 2004-05, Pallone considered a gubernatorial bid against embattled and unpopular Governor Jim McGreevey, but ended up supporting eventual nominee Jon Corzine.

Early in 2005, Pallone announced his intention to seek the Senate seat held at the time by Corzine. Corzine won the Democratic nomination for governor in June 2005, and Pallone was the first politician to officially seek Corzine's Senate seat. He launched "Pallone for New Jersey" to inform New Jersey citizens of his work in the House and his desire to be New Jersey's next senator. In January 2006, Pallone announced his endorsement of Bob Menendez for Senate in the November 2006 election, ending his bid for the seat.

Pallone was an early and strong endorser of Hillary Clinton in the 2008 Democratic presidential primaries. He traveled to New Hampshire to campaign for Clinton. Clinton lost the primary to Barack Obama, who went on to become president. Pallone also endorsed Frank Lautenberg over Congressman Rob Andrews.

== 2013 U.S. Senate election ==
On January 3, 2013, it was revealed that Pallone was considering another bid for the Senate should Frank Lautenberg elect not to pursue another term in office in 2014. On June 9, 2013, Pallone said he was officially in the race to fill Lautenberg's Senate seat, due to Lautenberg's death, and could win the Democratic primary against Newark Mayor Cory Booker by running on his progressive congressional record. Lautenberg's family endorsed Pallone on July 8, 2013. The state council of sheet metal workers also endorsed Pallone.

In the August 13, 2013 primary election, Pallone lost to Booker. Booker then won the general election.

== Electoral history ==
New Jersey's 11th senate district (1983): Results
Year	Democratic	Votes	Pct	Republican	Votes	Pct	3rd Party	Party	Votes	Pct
1983	Frank Pallone	24,339	50.4%	Brian T. Kennedy	23,412	48.5%	Edgar Van Houten	Bull Moose	508	0.1%

New Jersey's 3rd congressional district (1988–1993) and New Jersey's 6th congressional district (1993–2024): Results
Year	Democratic	Votes	Pct	Republican	Votes	Pct	3rd Party	Party	Votes	Pct	3rd Party	Party	Votes	Pct	3rd Party	Party	Votes	Pct	
1988 (special)	Frank Pallone	116,988	52.0%	Joseph Azzolina	106,489	47.3%	Laura Stewart	Libertarian	1,713	0.8%									
1988	Frank Pallone	117,024	51.6%	Joseph Azzolina	107,479	47.4%	Laura Stewart	Libertarian	2,107	0.9%									
1990	Frank Pallone	77,866	49.1%	Paul A. Kapalko	73,696	46.5%	Richard D. McKean	Independent	4,377	1.2%	William Stewart	Libertarian	1,833	1.2%	Joseph A. Plonski	Populist	871	0.5%	
1992	Frank Pallone	118,266	53.9%	Joe Kyrillos	100,949	46.1%	Joseph Spalletta	Independent	2,153	1.0%	William Stewart	Libertarian	1,404	0.6%	Peter Cerrato	Independent	1,073	0.5%	*
1994	Frank Pallone	88,922	60.4%	Mike Herson	55,287	37.5%	Charles H. Dickson	Independent	1,774	1.2%	Gary J. Rich	Conservative	800	0.5%	Richard Quinn	Natural Law	548	0.4%	
1996	Frank Pallone	124,635	61.3%	Steven Corodemus	73,402	36.1%	Keith Quarles	Libertarian	2,044	1.0%	Richard Sorrentino	Conservative	1,509	0.7%	Susan Normandin	Natural Law	548	0.6%	*
1998	Frank Pallone	78,102	57.0%	Mike Ferguson	55,180	40.3%	Carl Mayer	Independent	1,291	0.9%	Steve Nagle	Independent	1,262	0.9%	Leonard Marshall	Independent	1,262	0.9%	
2000	Frank Pallone	141,698	67.5%	Brian Kennedy	62,454	29.8%	Earl Gray	Green	4,252	2.0%	Karen Zaletel	Reform	1,120	0.5%	Sylvia Kuzmak	Conservative	328	0.2%	
2002	Frank Pallone	91,379	66.5%	Ric Medrow	42,479	30.9%	Richard Strong	Green	1,819	1.3%	Barry Allen	Libertarian	1,206	0.9%	Mac X. Lyden	Independent	612	0.5%	
2004	Frank Pallone	153,981	66.9%	Sylvester Fernandez	70,942	30.8%	Virginia Flynn	Libertarian	2,829	1.2%	Mac X. Lyden	Independent	2,399	1.0%					
2006	Frank Pallone	98,615	66.9%	Leigh-Ann Bellew	43,359	30.2%	Herbert Tarbous	Independent	1,619	1.1%									
2008	Frank Pallone	164,077	67.0%	Robert McLeod	77,469	31.6%	Herbert Tarbous	Independent	3,531	1.5%									
2010	Frank Pallone	81,933	54.7%	Anna Little	65,413	43.7%	Jack Freudenheim	Independent	1,299	0.9%	Karen Anne Zaletel	Green Tea Patriots	1,017	0.7%					
2012	Frank Pallone	151,782	63.3%	Anna Little	84,360	35.2%	Len Flynn	Libertarian	1,392	0.6%	Karen Anne Zaletel	Independent	868	0.4%	Mac Dara Lyden	Independent	830	0.3%	*
2014	Frank Pallone	72,190	59.9%	Anthony E. Wilkinson	46,891	38.9%	Dorit Goikhman	Libertarian	1,376	1.2%									
2016	Frank Pallone	167,895	63.7%	Brent Sonnek-Schmelz	91,908	34.9%	Rajit B. Malliah	Green	1,912	0.7%	Judith Shamy	Libertarian	1,720	0.7%					
2018	Frank Pallone	140,752	63.6%	Richard J. Pezzullo	80,443	36.4%													
2020	Frank Pallone	199,648	61.2%	Christian Onuoha	126,760	38.8%													
2022	Frank Pallone	106,238	57.5%	Sue Kiley	75,839	41.0%	Tara Fisher	Libertarian	1,361	0.7%									
2024	Frank Pallone	170,275	56.1%	Scott Fegler	122,519	40.3%	Fahad Akhtar	Common Sense Independent	4,871	1.6%	Herb Tarbous	Green	4,246	1.4%	Matthew Amitrano	Libertarian	1,770	0.6%	

Write-in and minor candidate notes: In 1992, 4 minor candidates received 2,248 votes collectively. In 1996, Socialist Workers candidate Stefanie Trice received 641 votes. In 2012, Reform candidate Herbert Tarbous received 406 votes.

== Personal life ==
Pallone lives with his wife Sarah Hospodor-Pallone and their three children in Long Branch, New Jersey. They married in August 1992. Pallone is a Roman Catholic.

== See also ==
- Visit of Delaney Hall during 2026 hunger strike and protests

U.S. House of Representatives
Preceded by James Howard	Member of the U.S. House of Representatives from New Jersey's 3rd congressional district 1988–1993	Succeeded by Jim Saxton
Preceded by Bernard Dwyer	Member of the U.S. House of Representatives from New Jersey's 6th congressional district 1993–present	Incumbent
Preceded by Greg Walden	Chair of the House Energy and Commerce Committee; 2019–2023	Succeeded by Cathy McMorris Rodgers
U.S. order of precedence (ceremonial)
Preceded by Nancy Pelosi	United States representatives by seniority 6th	Succeeded by Richard Neal
Preceded by Nancy Pelosi	Order of precedence of the United States	Succeeded by Richard Neal
