= Apra (foundation) =

Apra Аԥра
- Leader: Aslan Bzhania
- Founded: 9 April 2015

Apra (Abkhaz: Аԥра) is a foundation for socio-economic and political studies in Abkhazia, in opposition to the Government of President Khajimba. It was presented on 9 April 2015 by Aslan Bzhania, who had been the runner-up in the August 2014 presidential election. On 2 March 2016, it voiced its support for a planned referendum to hold an early presidential election.
