= Presidential election campaign fund checkoff =

Question on US income tax returns

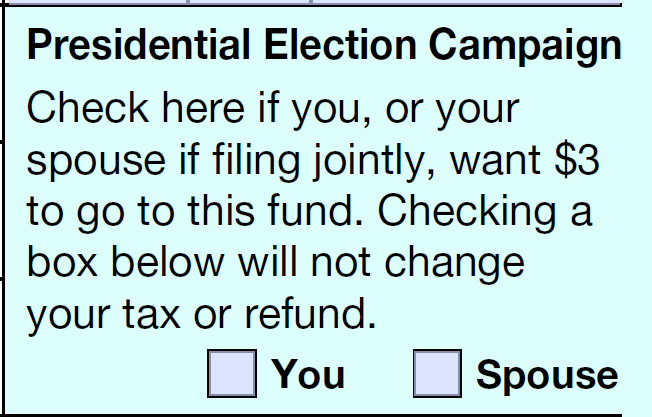
The question on the 2024 version of Form 1040

The presidential election campaign fund checkoff appears on income tax return forms in the United States as the question "Do you want $3 of your federal tax to go to the Presidential Election Campaign Fund?".

The indicated funds—originally $1 and implemented in 1966 and changed to $3 in 1994—began as a start to public funding of elections to provide for the financing of presidential primary and general-election campaigns, as well as national party conventions. Both the Republican and Democratic nominees in the general election receive a fixed amount of checkoff dollars. Nominees from other political parties may qualify for a smaller, proportionate amount of checkoff funds if they receive more than 5% of the vote. The national parties used to receive funds to cover the costs of their national conventions. Matching funds are also given for primary candidates for small contributions. The campaign fund reduces a candidate's dependence on large contributions from individuals and special-interest groups. This program is administered by the Federal Election Commission (FEC).

Requirements for a candidate to be declared eligible for funding under the Presidential Election Campaign Fund include agreeing to an overall spending limit, abiding by spending limits in each state, using public funds only for legitimate campaign-related expenses, keeping financial records, and permitting an extensive campaign audit.

The option for taxpayers does not change the amount of their individual tax or refund. Instead, the funds are designated to go to the Presidential Election Campaign Fund instead of the regular pool of the U.S. Treasury. Accordingly, the amount of the money in the fund is determined by how many taxpayers check the box.

== Primary election ==
The federal government will match up to $250 of an individual's total contributions to an eligible candidate.

Only candidates seeking nomination by a political party to the office of president are eligible to receive primary matching funds. In addition, a candidate must establish eligibility by submitting to the FEC proof that at least $5,000 was raised in each of at least 20 states. Only a maximum of $250 per individual applies toward the $5,000 threshold in each state.

The spending limit increases every cycle due to inflation. The FEC estimates that the limits for the primary election will be $40.9 million, of which a candidate must abide by state limits of 65.4 cents per person of voting age population in a state, or $817,800, whichever is greater. Certain fundraising expenses (up to 20 percent of the expenditure limit) and legal and accounting expenses incurred solely to ensure the campaign's compliance with the law do not count against the expenditure limits.

Once they have established eligibility for matching payments, presidential candidates may receive public funds to match contributions from individual contributors, up to $250 per individual. Contributions from political committees are not eligible for matching funds. Cash contributions are also ineligible, as their origins cannot be tracked.

Eligible candidates may receive public funds equaling up to half of the national spending limit for the primary campaign, although because of the donors that give up to the $2,300 limit, they generally raise much more money than they receive in matching funds.

In 2008, many of the top candidates chose not to accept the primary matching funds. Tom Tancredo, John Edwards, Chris Dodd, Joe Biden, Dennis Kucinich, and Duncan Hunter qualified for and elected to take public funds in the primary. John McCain qualified for public funds in the primary, but later decided to reject them. Barack Obama declined public funds for both the primary and the November election.

== General election ==
The presidential nominee of each major party (one whose candidate received more than 25% of the vote in the previous election) may become eligible for a public grant of $81.78 million (if the election were held in 2007). To be eligible to receive the public funds, the candidate must limit spending to the amount of the grant and cannot accept private contributions for the campaign. After the conventions, candidates raise funds for general election legal and accounting compliance funds (GELACs), which are to exclusively pay for legal and accounting expenses for the campaign. They can also pay for recounts, since that is considered a "winding down" expense allowed under regulations. These expenditures are not subject to the above limit. However, in 2007, the FEC ruled that up to 5% of broadcast advertising can be paid for using GELACs, since that is time nominally spent on the required disclaimers under the Bipartisan Campaign Reform Act, namely I approve this message.

In addition, candidates may spend up to $50,000 from their own personal funds. Such spending does not count against the expenditure limit.

Minor party candidates and new party candidates may become eligible for partial public funding of their general election campaigns. (A minor party candidate is the nominee of a party whose candidate received between 5 and 25 percent of the total popular vote in the preceding presidential election. A new party candidate is the nominee of a party that is neither a major party nor a minor party. This includes most "independent" candidates, because they run on a token party line.) The amount of public funding to which a minor party candidate is entitled is based on the ratio of the party's popular vote in the preceding presidential election to the average popular vote of the two major party candidates in that election. A new party candidate receives partial public funding after the election if the candidate receives 5 percent or more of the vote. The entitlement is based on the ratio of the new party candidate's popular vote in the current election to the average popular vote of the two major party candidates in the election.

Although minor and new party candidates may supplement public funds with private contributions and may exempt some fundraising costs from their expenditure limit, they are otherwise subject to the same spending limit and other requirements that apply to major party candidates.

== Participation ==
In 1977, about 29% of taxpayers checked off the box to contribute $1 of their taxes towards the fund. The level dropped to 19% by 1992 and dropped further to only 3.6% in 2020. This could be because of the increase from $1 to $3 in 1994 and a general lack of understanding of the fund. Two other reasons cited for the decline are an erroneous belief that donations increase tax liability and a general apathy toward the political duopoly.

== Re-assignment of funds ==
The portion of the checkoff that formerly went to pay for party conventions was diverted to pay for pediatric research in 2014, with the passage of the Gabriella Miller Kids First Research Act.

The Gabriella Miller Kids First Research Act (H.R. 2019; 113th Congress), which was passed into law on April 3, 2014, diverts the money in the Presidential Election Campaign Fund which was earmarked for party conventions, to pay for research into pediatric cancer through the National Institutes of Health. The total funding for research would come to $126 million over 10 years. As of 2014, the national conventions got about 23% of their funding from the Presidential Election Campaign Fund.

== See also ==
- History of the Federal Election Campaign Act (FECA)
- Tax choice
