= Markup (legislation) =

Process for amending and rewriting proposed legislation in the United States

Markup (or mark-up) is the process by which a U.S. congressional committee or state legislative session debates, amends, and rewrites proposed legislation.

== In the House of Representatives ==
The process of marking up bills and resolutions in committees of the House of Representatives generally resembles, but does not perfectly replicate, the process of amending measures on the House floor.

At the beginning of a markup, committee members often make opening statements, usually not exceeding five minutes apiece. The first reading of the text of the bill to be marked up can be waived, either by unanimous consent or by adopting a non-debatable motion. The bill then is read for amendment, one section at a time, with committee members offering their amendments to each section after it is read but before the next section is read. By unanimous consent only, the committee may agree to dispense with the reading of each section, or to consider a bill for amendment by titles or chapters instead of by sections. Also by unanimous consent, the committee may consider the entire bill as having been read and open to amendment at any point.

Each amendment must be read in full unless the committee waives that reading by unanimous consent. Committees debate amendments under the five-minute rule. A committee can end the debate on an amendment by ordering the previous question on it, or by agreeing to a motion to close debate on it. A committee also can order the previous question or close debate on the entire bill, once it has been read or that reading has been waived by unanimous consent. However, the committee can only close debate, not order the previous question, on individual sections (titles, chapters) of the bill. The various kinds of amendments, as well as most of the other motions, that are in order on the House floor are in order in committee as well.

Committees do not change the texts of the bills they mark up. Instead, committees vote on amendments that their members want to recommend that the House adopt when the House considers the bill on the floor. The committee concludes a markup not by voting on the bill as a whole, but by voting on a motion to order the bill reported to the House with the amendments that the committee has approved. A majority of the committee must be present when this final vote occurs. For all other stages of markups, committees may set their own quorum requirements, so long as that quorum is at least one-third of the committee's membership.

Like the Speaker of the House, committee chairs are responsible for maintaining order and for enforcing proper procedure, at their own initiative or by ruling on points of order that other committee members make. Chairs also frequently respond to questions about procedure in the form of parliamentary inquiries.

A committee may report a bill back to the House without amendment, with several amendments, or with an amendment in the nature of a substitute that proposes an entirely different text for the bill. Alternatively, a committee may report a new or "clean" bill on the same subject as the bill (or other text) that it has marked up.

== In other form ==
State governments and various kinds of municipalities also markup legislation and the process varies by locality. In some, the legislative branch marks up the legislation (or budget since it is a piece of legislation) by deleting parts and adding sections, etc.
