= Senator Haines =

Senator Haines may refer to:

- Albert R. Haines (1826–?), Ohio State Senate
- C. William Haines (1928–1996), New Jersey State Senate
- Doug Haines (fl. 2000s), Georgia State Senate
- John Charles Haines (1818–1896), Illinois State Senate
- Larry E. Haines (1938–2024), Maryland State Senate
- Phil Haines (born 1950), New Jersey State Senate

== See also ==
- William R. Haine (1944–2021), Illinois State Senate
