= Edwin B. Forsythe =

American politician (1916–1984)

Edwin Bell Forsythe
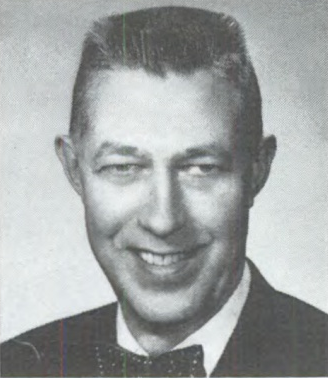

Member of the U.S. House of Representatives from New Jersey
- In office November 3, 1970 – March 29, 1984
- Preceded by: William T. Cahill
- Succeeded by: Jim Saxton
- Constituency: 6th district (1970–1983); 13th district (1983–1984)

Member of the New Jersey Senate
- In office January 14, 1964 – November 16, 1970
- Preceded by: Henry S. Haines
- Succeeded by: Walter L. Smith Jr.
- Constituency: Burlington County (1964–1966); District 4B (1966–1970)

Mayor of Moorestown Township, New Jersey
- In office 1957–1962
- Preceded by: William J. Hall, Jr.
- Succeeded by: Albert Ellis

Personal details
- Born: January 17, 1916 Westtown, Pennsylvania, U.S.
- Died: March 29, 1984 (aged 68) Moorestown, New Jersey, U.S.
- Party: Republican

Edwin Bell Forsythe (January 17, 1916 – March 29, 1984) was an American Republican Party politician from New Jersey who represented parts of Burlington, Ocean, and Camden counties in the United States House of Representatives from 1970 until his death from lung cancer in 1984.

== Biography ==
Forsythe was born in Westtown Township, Pennsylvania on January 17, 1916, and attended the local public schools. He served as secretary on the Moorestown Township, New Jersey Board of Adjustment from 1948 to 1952, was a member of the Moorestown Committee from 1953 to 1962, serving as Mayor of Moorestown, New Jersey from 1957 to 1962, and was chairman of the Moorestown Planning Board from 1962 to 1963. He was a member of the executive board of the New Jersey State League of Municipalities from 1958 to 1962. Forsythe was elected to the New Jersey Senate, where he served from 1964 to 1970. He was a delegate to the New Jersey Constitutional convention in 1966 and selected as a delegate to the 1968 Republican National Convention.

Forsythe was elected simultaneously as a Republican to the 91st and to the 92nd Congress by special election to fill the vacancy caused by the resignation of United States Representative William T. Cahill to become Governor of New Jersey, and reelected to the seven succeeding Congresses (November 3, 1970 – March 29, 1984). Forsythe represented New Jersey's 6th congressional district until 1983. In redistricting following the 1980 United States census, Forsythe was shifted to New Jersey's 13th congressional district, where he was elected for a single term in office.

Forsythe died at the age of 68 at his home in Moorestown Township on March 29, 1984, due to lung cancer. His remains were cremated and his ashes interred at Union Street Friends Cemetery, Medford, New Jersey.

== Legacy ==
The Edwin B. Forsythe National Wildlife Refuge is named in his honor.

== See also ==
- List of members of the United States Congress who died in office (1950–1999)

U.S. House of Representatives
Preceded by William T. Cahill	Member of the U.S. House of Representatives from New Jersey's 6th congressional district 1971–1983	Succeeded by Bernard J. Dwyer
Preceded by Jim Courter	Member of the U.S. House of Representatives from New Jersey's 13th congressional district 1983–1984	Succeeded by Jim Saxton
Political offices
Preceded by Sido L. Ridolfi	President of the New Jersey Senate; 1968	Succeeded by Frank X. McDermott
