= Martha W. Bark =

American politician (1928–2015)

Member of the New Jersey Senate from the 8th district
- In office January 14, 1997 – January 8, 2008
- Preceded by: C. William Haines
- Succeeded by: Phil Haines

Member of the New Jersey General Assembly from the 8th district
- In office March 13, 1995 – January 14, 1997
- Preceded by: Harold L. Colburn, Jr.
- Succeeded by: Larry Chatzidakis

Member of the Burlington County Board of Chosen Freeholders
- In office 1984–1997
- Preceded by: Harold L. Colburn, Jr.

Mayor of Medford Township
- In office 1981–1985

Member of Medford Township Council
- In office 1980–1987

Member of the Medford Public Schools Board of Education
- In office 1973–1978

Personal details
- Born: July 30, 1928 South Bend, Indiana
- Died: May 1, 2015 (aged 86) Voorhees Township, New Jersey
- Party: Republican
- Children: 3
- Education: DePauw University (B.A.)

Martha Bark (née Whitmer; July 30, 1928 – May 1, 2015) was an American Republican Party politician, who served in the New Jersey State Senate from 1997 to 2008, where she represented the 8th Legislative District. She served as Deputy Minority Leader from 2004 to 2008. She was a member of the lower house of the New Jersey Legislature, the New Jersey General Assembly, from 1995 to 1997.

== Biography ==
She was born on July 30, 1928, in South Bend, Indiana, to Hazel and Harold Whitmer. Bark received a B.A. from DePauw University, with a major in economics with graduate work in accounting.

Prior to her state legislative career, Bark was an executive with the Curtis-Young Corporation and a parole counselor at the Albert C. Wagner Youth Correctional Facility.

She served on the Medford Township Public Schools Board of Education from 1973 to 1978. Later, she served on the Medford Township council from 1980 to 1987 and was the township's mayor in 1981 and 1985. Bark served on the Burlington County Board of Chosen Freeholders from 1984 to 1997.

In 1995, incumbent 8th District Assemblyman Harold L. Colburn, Jr. resigned to become the medical director of the Board of Medical Examiners (a division of the State Division of Consumer Affairs), Bark was unanimously chosen by the local county Republican Committees to fill his seat. Coincidentally, Bark succeeded Colburn on the Freeholder Board when she joined in 1984. Bark was sworn into the Assembly on March 13 but continued to hold her Freeholder seat as dual office holding was allowed in the state at the time. After winning re-election to the Assembly in the 1995 general election, Bark was appointed to the State Senate on January 14, 1997 to succeed C. William Haines who died of cancer on December 18, 1996. The same year, she won election to a full term in the Senate while choosing not to run for re-election to the Freeholder Board. At the time of her appointment to the Senate, she was one of two women serving there (the other being Wynona Lipman).

She served in the Senate on the Budget and Appropriations Committee, the Economic Growth Committee and on the Joint Committee on the Public Schools.

As of 2006, Bark was facing a New Jersey State investigation over about $330,000 that she was paid by the Burlington County Bridge Commission and the Burlington County Institute of Technology for part-time work performed from 1997 to 2003. It was alleged that these were patronage jobs which were created in order to funnel income to Senator Bark for jobs that were not advertised to the public and for which there are no records of actual work performed by the Senator. Though she did not cite the probe as a reason, Bark announced her retirement from the Senate in January 2007.

She died on May 1, 2015, at Virtua Voorhees Hospital in Voorhees, New Jersey.

== Legacy ==
Bark was survived by her three children and six grandchildren.

== Electoral history ==
=== New Jersey Senate ===
8th legislative district general election, 2001
| Party | Candidate | Votes | % | ±% |
|---|---|---|---|---|
| Republican | Martha W. Bark (incumbent) | 35,276 | 60.67 | ▲5.75 |
| Democratic | Gary E. Haman | 22,865 | 39.33 | |
| Total votes | | 58,141 | 100 | |
| Republican hold | | | | |

8th legislative district general election, 1997
| Party | Candidate | Votes | % |
|---|---|---|---|
| Republican | Martha W. Bark | 34,597 | 54.92 |
| Democratic | Marie Hall | 28,401 | 45.08 |
| Total votes | | 62,998 | 100 |

New Jersey Senate
| Preceded by C. William Haines | Member of the New Jersey Senate for the 8th District; January 14, 1997 – January 8, 2008 | Succeeded by Phil Haines |
New Jersey General Assembly
| Preceded by Harold L. Colburn, Jr. | Member of the New Jersey General Assembly for the 8th District; March 13, 1995 – January 14, 1997; With: Francis L. Bodine | Succeeded by Larry Chatzidakis |
