= Francis L. Bodine =

American politician (1936–2023)

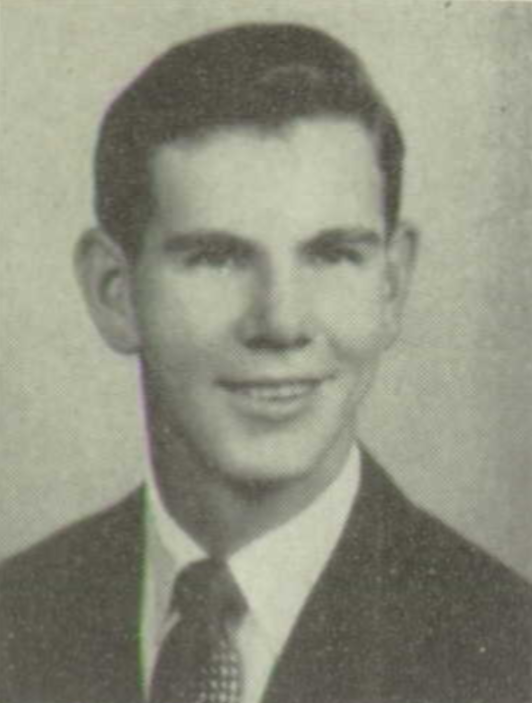
- Bodine in 1953

Member of the New Jersey General Assembly from the 8th district
- In office February 28, 1994 – January 8, 2008 Serving with Martha W. Bark and Larry Chatzidakis
- Preceded by: Robert C. Shinn Jr.
- Succeeded by: Dawn Marie Addiego; Scott Rudder

Mayor of Moorestown Township, New Jersey
- In office 1981–1987
- Preceded by: James Euel Palmer
- Succeeded by: Walter T. Maahs, Jr.

Personal details
- Born: January 10, 1936 Moorestown, New Jersey, U.S.
- Died: January 11, 2023 (aged 87)
- Party: Democratic (2007–2023)
- Other political affiliations: Republican (before 2007)

Francis L. "Fran" Bodine (January 10, 1936 – January 11, 2023) was an American Republican Party politician who served in the New Jersey General Assembly from 1994 to 2008, where he represented the 8th Legislative District. He switched to the Democratic Party in 2007 after local Republicans dropped support for his reelection campaign to the Assembly and unsuccessfully ran for the New Jersey Senate.

== Biography ==
Bodine served in the Assembly on the Homeland Security and State Preparedness Committee. He served in the Assembly as Deputy Leader from 2006 to 2007, served as the Assistant Republican Whip from 2002 to 2006 and was the Assistant Majority Whip during 2000–2001. Bodine was selected in February 1994 by the District Republican Committee to fill the vacancy created by the resignation of Assemblyman Robert C. Shinn Jr.

On April 5, 2007, Bodine announced that he was switching from the Republican Party, would serve the balance of his term as a Democrat, and would run as a Democrat to fill the Senate seat to be vacated by Martha W. Bark. Bodine's switch followed the Burlington County Republican Party's decision to endorse another candidate to fill Bodine's seat in the Assembly. Bodine, running as a Democrat, was defeated by the Republican candidate, Phil Haines, on November 6, 2007, in his race for the New Jersey State Senate by a margin of 39% to 61%.

Assemblyman Bodine sponsored legislation providing for $500 million bridge repair bond referendum, unification of ports of Pennsylvania and Camden oversight agencies and for authorization and funding of the Delaware Valley light rail project. He served on the Burlington County Board of Chosen Freeholders from 1985 to 1994 and as its Director in 1988 and 1993. He was a Commissioner of the Delaware River Port Authority from 1983 to 1990 where he was the chairman of the executive committee and vice chairman, operation and maintenance. He was the Mayor of Moorestown Township, New Jersey from 1981 to 1987 and served on its council from 1977 to 1978. He served in the United States Army from 1954 to 1956.

== Personal ==
Bodine was born and raised in Moorestown, New Jersey and graduated from Moorestown High School. He received a B.S. degree in 1960 from La Salle University in Marketing. He was a Senior Account Executive for Grinspec Consulting before entering politics.

He resided in Moorestown and later Surf City, New Jersey. He died one day after his 87th birthday on January 11, 2023.
