= Victoria Napolitano =

American politician (born 1988)

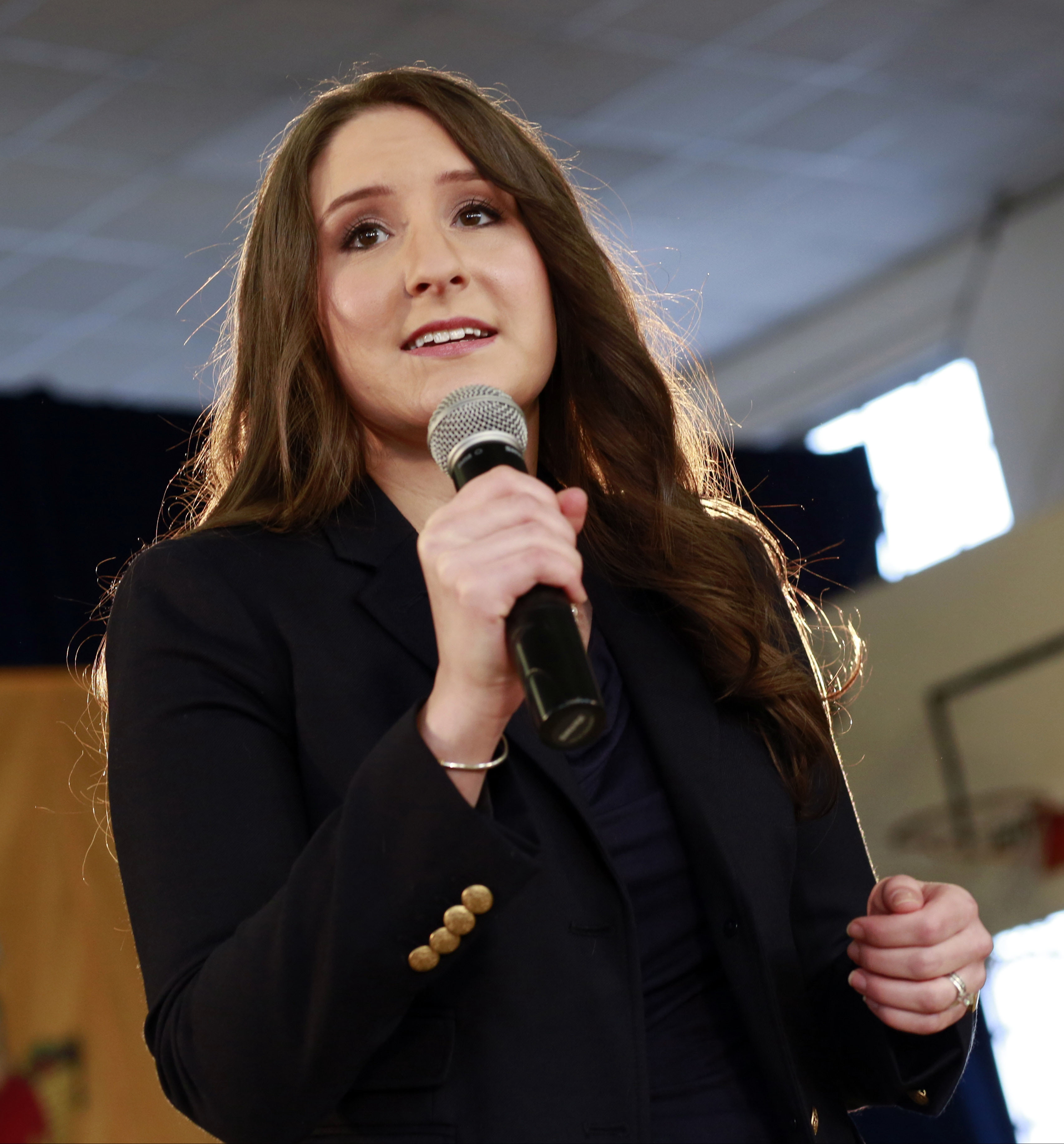

Mayor of Moorestown
- In office January 6, 2015 – January 6, 2016
- Deputy: Phil Garwood
- Preceded by: Chris Chiacchio
- Succeeded by: Phil Garwood

Deputy Mayor of Moorestown, New Jersey
- In office January 6, 2016 – January 3, 2017
- Preceded by: Phil Garwood
- Succeeded by: Stacey Jordan

Member of the Moorestown Town Council
- In office January 7, 2013 – January 6, 2021
- Preceded by: John Button, Greg Gallo, and Mike Testa
- Succeeded by: Dave Zipin, Sue Mammarella, and Jake VanDyken

Personal details
- Born: Victoria Lynne Spellman; August 16, 1988 (age 38)
- Party: Republican
- Spouse: Vincent S. Napolitano (m. 2011)
- Children: 2
- Education: Drexel University (BS, MS)

Victoria Napolitano (born Victoria Lynne Spellman; August 16, 1988) is an American Republican politician who served as a Councilwoman of Moorestown, New Jersey. She began her term on the Moorestown Township Council on January 7, 2013. She made history in 2015 by becoming Moorestown's youngest Mayor ever at the age of 26, and is the youngest female to ever hold the office of Mayor statewide. In 2016, she served as the township's Deputy Mayor. She retired from the township's town council in 2021, citing the want to "explore new ventures, and, more importantly, to make room for new individuals to bring their fresh ideas to the council."

== Personal life ==
Napolitano grew up in Cranford, New Jersey and is a graduate of Union Catholic Regional High School in Scotch Plains, New Jersey. She then went on to Drexel University, where she earned a bachelors' in education and minor in English, and a masters' in teaching, learning, and curriculum in just over four years. Napolitano is currently an Instructional Designer and Trainer with Clarivate Analytics in Philadelphia, Pennsylvania.

Napolitano has been active in numerous civic organizations and activities, including MoorArts performing arts group, Historical Society of Moorestown, the Lenola Advisory Committee, the National Federation for Women Legislators, Save the Environment of Moorestown (STEM), the Moorestown Improvement Association, Friends of the Moorestown Library, the Burlington County Young Republicans, and Our Lady of Good Counsel Church.

She married her high school sweetheart, Vinny Napolitano, who she met in 2003 when they were both in a production of A Funny Thing Happened on the Way to the Forum. The pair moved to the Lenola section of Moorestown in 2010 and currently reside in West Moorestown.

During her 2016 re-election campaign, Napolitano announced that she and her husband were expecting their first child, making Napolitano the first member of the Moorestown Council to give birth while in office. Her daughter, Elliot Eliza Napolitano, was born on March 26, 2017.

In March 2019, Napolitano and her husband welcomed their second child, daughter Reagan Noelle Napolitano. Napolitano gained attention for what she refers to as "motherhood in public," bringing her daughter with her to Township meetings and events. She stated that she hopes "that serves as an example that young women can step up to take leadership positions and be involved in things like this, and they don’t have to do it before or after their child-bearing years [...] There’s no reason why we should have to sit that out.”

== Township Council Election, 2012 ==
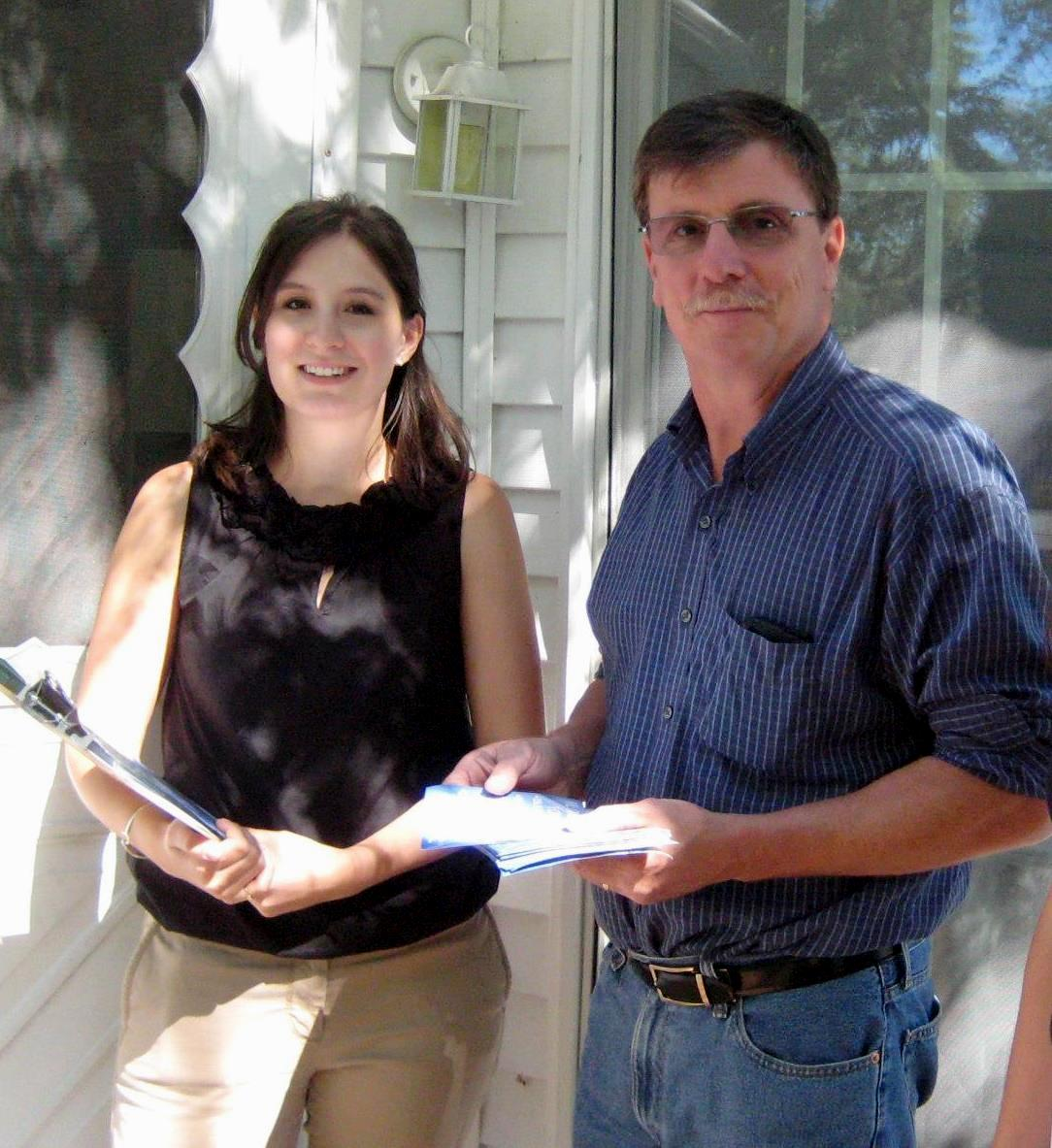
Napolitano campaigning with her running mate, Phil Garwood, in 2012

In 2012, a pool of "16 to 18" candidates were screened to run for Township Council by the Moorestown Republican Municipal Committee (MRMC). The committee opted against endorsing then-Mayor John Button for re-election, citing differences of opinion as well as his inability to work with Councilwoman Stacey Jordan and Councilman Chris Chiacchio. Instead, the Republican Party chose to run Victoria Napolitano along with Recreation Advisory Committee Chair Phil Garwood and Pete Palko, the CEO of an environmental remediation company. Button's 2008 running mates, Deputy Mayor Greg Gallo and Councilman Mike Testa, did not seek a second term.

Two weeks later, the Moorestown Democratic Committee endorsed Democrats J. Greg Newcomer, Brian Sattinger and Mark Hines as their 2012 Council candidates. Both Sattinger and Hines were second-time candidates for Township Council, having lost races in 2010 and 2008, respectively.

In May 2012, Mayor John Button announced that though he was not selected to run as a Republican, he would be seeking reelection as part of an Independent slate of candidates that included developer Randy Cherkas and businesswoman Elaine Goralski. However, their team withdrew from the race in early September, putting the election back to a two-slate race.

During the campaign, Napolitano knocked on over 5,000 doors and ran on a message centered around bringing attention to the Lenola section of Moorestown, preserving the Open Space Trust Fund, and completing the rebuild of the Town Hall Complex, which had burned down in a 2007 fire.

On election day, Napolitano was the top vote-getter with 5,580 votes, outpacing her Republican running mates as well as her Democratic opponents.

== Township Council ==
Napolitano was sworn in as a Councilwoman on January 7, 2013, by Congressman Jon Runyan. Napolitano's swearing-in marked the first time in the township's history that two women served together on the Township Council, and on the same night, the council made history by electing Stacey Jordan as Moorestown's first female Mayor.

During her first two years on the Township Council, Napolitano spearheaded the creation of the Lenola Advisory Commission to address the problems facing the western portion of Moorestown.

Napolitano, along with her Council colleagues, increased communication between the Township Council and residents in Moorestown by bringing back "Residents Requests and Presentations" to Council meetings - an item eliminated in 2011 - and by holding office hours for members of the public who could not attend regularly scheduled Council meetings

In May 2014, the Moorestown Town Council opened the doors to the new Town Hall and Library Complex under the originally allocated budget. Napolitano and her colleagues praised the opening of the building, which fulfilled a campaign promise of Napolitano and her running mate, Phil Garwood. Eight months later, Napolitano would be the first person to take the oath of office as Mayor in the new Town Hall building.

At Napolitano's urging, Mayor Stacey Jordan proclaimed April as Autism Awareness Month for the first time in town history. Napolitano serves as an Autism Ambassador for Autism New Jersey.

== Mayor ==
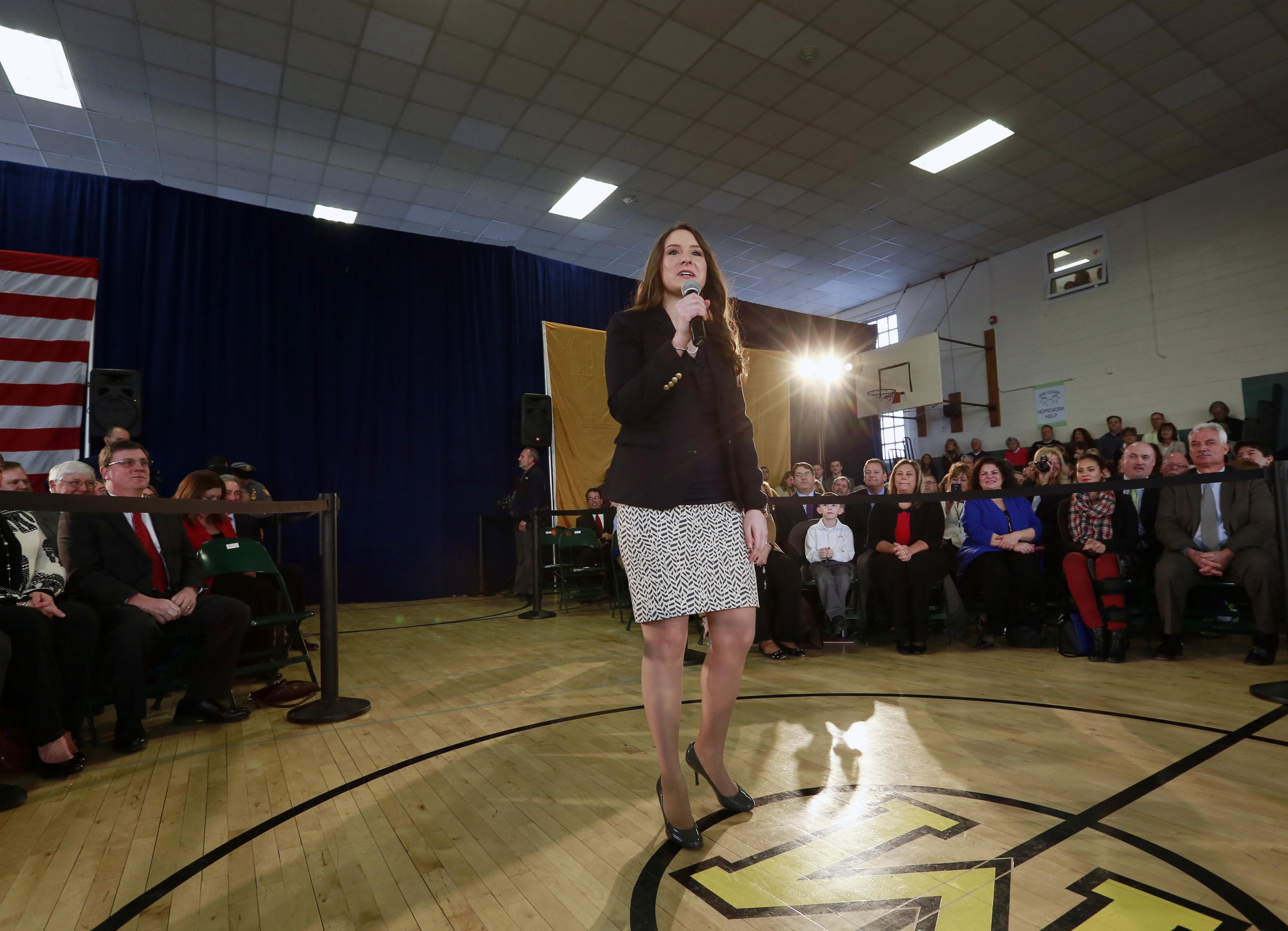
Mayor Napolitano addresses the crowd at a Town Hall Meeting at the Moorestown Recreation Center

Napolitano was sworn in as Moorestown's youngest Mayor on January 7, 2015, by Judge Lois F. Downey. Though no records were kept to confirm, Napolitano may also be the youngest woman to ever be sworn in as Mayor statewide in New Jersey.

Napolitano stated that her priority as Mayor will be to work on keeping taxes low and building a stronger business climate in Moorestown Of her age, Napolitano stated, "Credibility isn't a gift handed out on your 30th or 40th birthday [...] It's something you can earn at any age. An articulate, respectfully delivered opinion should be welcome from anyone."

In April 2015, Napolitano led the Township Council in passing ordinances that would protect municipal open space land from encroachments and to crack down on vacant or abandoned homes and properties.

Mayor Napolitano cast the lone dissenting vote on Moorestown's 2015 municipal budget, opposing the budget's proposed tax increase. Napolitano stated that she would rather use a portion of the township's $7 million surplus to allow taxes to stay flat for residents.

Napolitano celebrated the opening of two new volleyball courts at Jeff Young Park in the Lenola section of Moorestown in July 2015. The courts were created in a partnership between the Township Council and the non-profit organization Kennedy's Cause.

Under Napolitano, Moorestown has moved to clean-up Strawbridge Lake watershed, spending $80,000 to test water quality, remove invasive vegetation such as spatterdock, and develop an ongoing management plan for the lake. Napolitano stated, "The lake has been described as the jewel in the crown of Moorestown [...] It's worth the investment.". Additionally, Napolitano moved to have the Township Council designate the Sustainable Moorestown Green Team as a permanent advisory committee within the township, calling the group "a valuable asset to the community" and protecting the group from potential disbandment by future elected officials.

Napolitano declared August 2015 as Agriculture Appreciation Month in Moorestown and spent time visiting with local farms and agribusinesses to draw attention to Moorestown's various agricultural assets. She was joined in this effort by Lt. Governor Kim Guadagno and Secretary of Agriculture Doug Fisher.

Mayor Napolitano started the process of building a dog park in Moorestown along with the Burlington County Freeholders. The park was completed in Fall 2017 at Swedes Run and incorporated historical markers for Swedes Run Barn, a picnic pavilion, and improved parking facilities.

In September 2015, Napolitano joined members of Save the Environment of Moorestown (STEM) to secure placement and installation of a historical marker on Stokes Hill, a favorite sledding spot in Moorestown. The marker tells the story of the "saving of Stokes Hill" by local artist and activist Carol Mastran, who led townspeople against the development of the plot of land in the early 1990s. At the ceremonial unveiling, Napolitano said, "Carol Mastran's work to preserve Stokes Hill is an important part of our town's history. I hope that every child who visits Stokes Hill learns something from this historic marker."

In the aftermath of the 2015 fire of The Moorestown Community House, Mayor Napolitano honored first responders and others who helped save the historic building by issuing each individual a Mayoral proclamation. Napolitano and the Township Council also moved to cancel the annual Moorestown Boards and Committees Dinner, opting instead to donate the funds allocated for that event to The Moorestown Community House's restoration efforts.

== Deputy Mayor and Re-Election Campaign ==
In keeping with recent tradition, Napolitano stepped down as Mayor after serving one year in order to allow another member of the Township Council to serve. She nominated her Deputy Mayor, Phil Garwood, to be her successor, and the motion carried in a 4-0-1 vote, with the lone Democrat on the council abstaining. Councilwoman Stacey Jordan nominated Napolitano to serve as Deputy Mayor for 2016, and the motion carried by the same 4-0-1 vote.

Deputy Mayor Napolitano joined her colleagues in passing a tax cut for the residents of Moorestown in the 2016 municipal budget, praising the move as a real commitment to tax relief.

In March 2016, Napolitano announced she would be seeking re-election along with Mayor Phil Garwood and newcomer Mike Locatell. The candidates ran on a platform of lower taxes, business development, updating Moorestown's aging infrastructure and water facilities, protecting open space, and increasing transparency. Democratic incumbent Lisa Petriello ran with newcomers Kati Angelini and Amy Leis against the Republican slate. On Election Day, Napolitano was re-elected to a second term along with running mate Locatell and opponent Petriello, delivering a continued 4-1 Republican majority in spite of Democratic presidential candidate Hillary Clinton winning the town 56%-40% against Republican Donald Trump

Moody's Investors Service issued a report in October 2016 stating that Moorestown Township was "financially healthy," with their report saying the township is doing well thanks to "strong financial management" and that the "economy and tax base of the Township are healthy overall." Napolitano praised the news, stating that the Township Council was able to invest in infrastructure and water improvements, protecting our open spaces, upgrading our various athletic facilities, and increasing business ratables while still delivering a tax decrease.

Napolitano led the charge on Township Council to continue investment into the Lenola Town Center portion of the municipality, announcing in the Fall of 2016 that the Township would be applying for millions of dollars in grant funding from the federal government to deliver streetscaping improvements, plant new trees, install new curbing and crosswalks, and more.

On December 12, 2016, Moorestown saw its first Police Chief in decades with the swearing-in of Chief Lee Lieber by Mayor Phil Garwood. Napolitano held the Bible on which the Chief took the Oath of Office during this ceremony.

== Second term ==
Napolitano was sworn into her second term on the Township Council on January 3, 2017. The oath of office was administered by Burlington County Freeholder Linda Hughes. On the same night, the Township Council made history by voting to appoint Moorestown's first Mayor of Hispanic descent, Manny Delgado.

In January 2017, the Moorestown Township Council announced the launch of 'Moorestown TV', on online archive of recordings of Township Council meetings and other events in the community. Napolitano, who serves as the governing body's Technology and Telecommunications Committee Liaison, lauded the move and called it a "major priority" for the elected officials on the Township Council.

Upon State Senator Diane Allen's announcement that she would not seek re-election, Napolitano's name was circulated by numerous sources as a potential Republican candidate for the open seat. In the end, however, Napolitano did not file as a candidate for this race.

Napolitano, along with the other members of the Republican majority, voted in May 2017 to support a request from the Moorestown Police Department to acquire a non-weaponized military vehicle from the federal government surplus program. Police Chief Lee Lieber stated that the Police Department felt the vehicle was a necessary acquisition that could potentially save lives in natural weather events, terrorist acts at high-profile sites like the Moorestown Mall or Lockheed Martin, or active shooter situations. Napolitano argued that the Moorestown Police needed to be trusted, and that "we have to prepare for the world we live in, not the one we want to live in." The lone Democrat on the council, Lisa Petriello, voted no, citing concerns about symbolism of militarizing the police. This led to a public backlash and a petition by a nonpartisan group, Support Moorestown Police, urging Petriello to stand with Moorestown Police in all future votes.

In late June 2017, it was announced that Moorestown would be receiving $971,520.00 in grant dollars to revitalize the Lenola Town Center, a project pushed by Napolitano since she assumed office in 2013. The project was supported by the Township Council in 2016 and endorsed by Senator Diane Allen, Freeholder Director Bruce Garganio, and the Burlington County Board of Chosen Freeholders. Napolitano - who led the formation of the Lenola Ad Hoc Committee and Lenola Advisory Commission with Lenola resident Jamie Boren - lauded the decision to award the grant to Moorestown, stating "It's been a long journey, but I'm ecstatic that because of the hard work of so many people, we've finally reached a point where we can turn the page on the past and begin a new chapter for Lenola." The grant dollars will be utilized to implement a conceptual plan that proposes bike lanes, improved landscaping, new sidewalks and crosswalks, parking solutions, and improved lighting on Camden Avenue and parts of bisecting Lenola Road.

Napolitano introduced a municipal ordinance in October 2017 banning the sale of animals from puppy and kitten mills within Moorestown Township. The ordinance, which ultimately was passed unanimously across party lines, was praised by numerous organizations including The Humane Society of the United States.

In June 2019, Napolitano joined with fellow Republican Mike Locatell in opposing a tax increase on residents contained in the Moorestown municipal budget, citing the municipality's over $8 million surplus. The budget advanced in a vote of 3–2, supported by the Democratic members of the governing body.

== Awards and honors ==
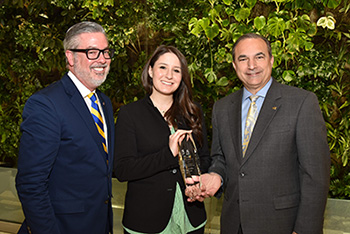
Napolitano receiving the Drexel University Distinguished Alumni Service Award from Drexel President John Fry and Alumni Board Chair Tony Noce

In May 2013, Napolitano was named a Star Citizen in Suburban Family Magazine for her work as an Autism Ambassador.

Napolitano was named to the inaugural class of the Burlington County Times' Forty Under 40 in July 2013.

In August 2015, Napolitano was named to PolitickerNJ's "30 Under 30" for influential young people in New Jersey politics.

Napolitano was named to the Drexel University Forty Under Forty, an "annual compendium of Drexel's most innovative, impressive and inspiring young alumni," in March 2016.

In August 2016, Napolitano was named to Obeserver New Jersey Politics' "30 Under 30" list for political up-and-comers in New Jersey.

Napolitano was awarded the Drexel University Distinguished Alumni Service Award for her work in Moorestown Township and her commitment to bettering her community and the world.

Napolitano was featured on the cover of South Jersey Biz magazine after being named to the publication's 20 Under 40 list of young professionals who have shown dedication to building a better region and are working to move South Jersey forward.

In 2017, Napolitano was included in the InsiderNJ "50 Under 30" in New Jersey politics list.

Napolitano and her husband were listed in InsiderNJ's 2017 New Jersey Power Couples List

In January 2018, Napolitano was named one of 30 Women to Watch in New Jersey politics by The Save Jersey Blog

In July 2018, Napolitano was included in InsiderNJ's list of Millennials on the Rise.

In November 2019, Napolitano was named a National Elected Woman of Excellence by the National Foundation for Women Legislators. According to the NFWL, "this award was created to identify women who have worked tirelessly, often breaking down barriers and overcoming obstacles that once seemed insurmountable, to serve their communities. These pacesetters have engendered an environment where women can now serve in public office and fight for the issues they are passionate about." She was presented this award at the NFWL's Annual Conference in San Antonio, Texas.

== Election history ==
Moorestown Township Council Election Results, 2012
Party	Candidate	Votes	%
Republican	Victoria Napolitano	5,580	18
Republican	Phil Garwood	5,467	17
Democratic	J. Greg Newcomer	5,345	17
Republican	Pete Palko	5,321	17
Democratic	Brian Sattinger	4,899	15
Democratic	Mark Hines	4,869	15

Moorestown Township Council Election Results, 2016
Party	Candidate	Votes	%
Democratic	Lisa Petriello	5,563	17
Republican	Mike Locatell	5,530	17
Republican	Victoria Napolitano	5,469	17
Republican	Phil Garwood	5,393	16
Democratic	Amy Leis	5,303	16
Democratic	Kati Angelini	5,421	16
