= Kirbys Mills =

Kirbys Mills may refer to:

- Kirbys Mills, New Jersey
- Kirby's Mill in Medford, New Jersey
