= Robert J. Meyer =

American politician

Member of the New Jersey General Assembly from the 8th district
- In office January 12, 1982 – July 14, 1984 Serving with C. William Haines
- Preceded by: Jim Saxton; Clifford W. Snedeker
- Succeeded by: Harold L. Colburn Jr.

Personal details
- Born: February 9, 1935 Philadelphia, Pennsylvania
- Died: July 14, 1984 (aged 49) Mount Holly, New Jersey
- Party: Republican

Robert J. Meyer (February 9, 1935 – July 14, 1984) was an American developer and politician who served in the New Jersey General Assembly from the 8th Legislative District from 1982 until his death in 1984.

A resident of Medford, New Jersey, he died of a heart attack on July 14, 1984, in Mount Holly, New Jersey at age 49.
