= Harold L. Colburn Jr. =

American physician and politician

Member of the New Jersey General Assembly from the 8th Legislative District
- In office September 12, 1984 – March 1, 1995 Serving with Robert C. Shinn Jr.
- Preceded by: Robert J. Meyer
- Succeeded by: Martha W. Bark

Personal details
- Born: October 2, 1925 Orange, New Jersey
- Died: May 1, 2012 (aged 86) Moorestown, New Jersey
- Party: Republican

Harold L. Colburn Jr. (October 2, 1925 – May 1, 2012) was an American physician and politician who served in the New Jersey General Assembly from the 8th Legislative District from 1984 to 1995.

== Early life ==
Born in Orange, Coburn attended Montclair High School in nearby Montclair. After graduating in 1947 from Princeton University, he earned his medical degree at Albany Medical College.

== Career ==
Colburn, a practicing dermatologist, served on the Burlington County, New Jersey Board of Chosen Freeholders from 1971 to 1984 and represented the 8th Legislative District in the New Jersey General Assembly from 1984 to 1995.

== Personal life ==
A resident of Mount Laurel, Coburn died on May 1, 2012, in Moorestown, New Jersey at age 86.
