= Jim Saxton =

American politician (born 1943)

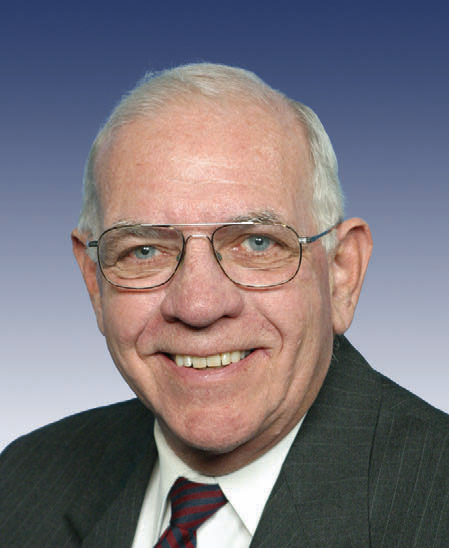

Member of the U.S. House of Representatives from New Jersey
- In office November 6, 1984 – January 3, 2009
- Preceded by: Edwin B. Forsythe
- Succeeded by: John Adler
- Constituency: 13th district (1984–1993); 3rd district (1993–2009)

Member of the New Jersey Senate from the 8th district
- In office January 12, 1982 – November 6, 1984
- Preceded by: Barry T. Parker
- Succeeded by: C. William Haines

Member of the New Jersey General Assembly from the 8th district
- In office January 13, 1976 – January 12, 1982 Serving with Clifford W. Snedeker
- Preceded by: John A. Sweeney
- Succeeded by: C. William Haines; Robert J. Meyer

Personal details
- Born: Hugh James Saxton; January 22, 1943 (age 83) Nicholson, Pennsylvania, U.S.
- Party: Republican
- Education: East Stroudsburg University (BA); Temple University
- Saxton's voice Saxton recognizing casualties of Operation Eagle Claw. Recorded June 21, 2005

Hugh James Saxton (born January 22, 1943) is an American politician from New Jersey. A member of the Republican Party, he represented parts of Burlington, Ocean, and Camden counties in the United States House of Representatives from 1984 to 2009. Before entering Congress, he served in the New Jersey Senate and the New Jersey General Assembly.

Saxton is a director emeritus on the board of New Jersey–based energy equipment and systems company Holtec International.

== Life ==
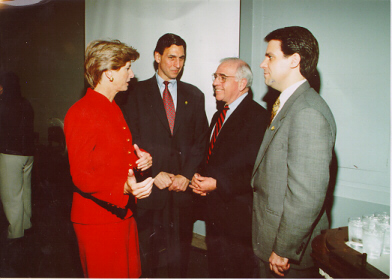
Saxton meets with Governor of New Jersey Christine Todd Whitman and fellow New Jersey Republican Representatives Frank LoBiondo (2nd district) and Mike Pappas (12th district) in 1997.

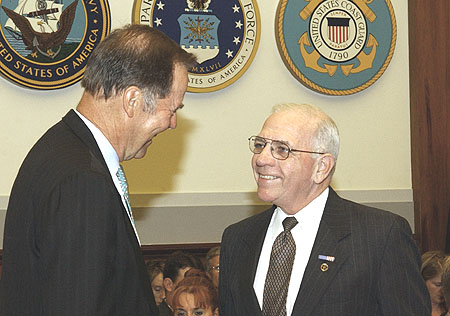
Saxton meets with former Governor of New Jersey Thomas Kean in 2004.

Born in Nicholson, Pennsylvania, on January 22, 1943, he attended East Stroudsburg State College (now East Stroudsburg University of Pennsylvania) and Temple University. He then pursued a career as an elementary public school teacher and small business owner. Saxton served in the New Jersey General Assembly (the lower chamber of the New Jersey Legislature) from 1976 to 1981 and in the New Jersey Senate from 1982 to 1984.

Saxton had been a resident of the Vincentown section of Southampton Township, New Jersey.

In 1984, 13th District Congressman Edwin B. Forsythe died with nine months left in his seventh full term. Saxton was elected as his successor. He ran in two elections which took place on the same day—a special election for the balance of Forsythe's term, and a regular election for a full two-year term. This gave him greater seniority than other freshmen congressmen elected in 1984. He was reelected 11 times without serious difficulty, always winning at least 58 percent of the vote. His district was renumbered as the 3rd District after New Jersey lost a seat in the 1990 census.

He was a high-ranking member of the Armed Services Committee and the Resources Committee and Ranking Republican Member and Chairman of the Joint Economic Committee made up of members of the Senate and House of Representatives.

In 2000, Saxton was challenged by then Cherry Hill Mayor Susan Bass Levin, giving Saxton a spirited challenge for the first time in years though Saxton ultimately prevailed.

In the United States House elections, 2006, Saxton was challenged by Democrat Rich Sexton, a lawyer and U.S. Navy veteran from Mount Laurel. Saxton won reelection by a 58%–41% margin.

Saxton was widely praised across South Jersey for his efforts to remove Fort Dix from the Pentagon's base realignment and closure lists in 1989 and 1991, McGuire Air Force Base from the list in 1993, and Lakehurst Naval Air Station from the list in 1995. From 1993 to 2005, he worked to foster joint military facilities at the three installations. Saxon's efforts were rewarded when Congress passed and President Bush signed into law the Base Realignment and Closure, 2005. In addition to saving the bases' 17,000 jobs, the legislation merged the three bases, creating a "megabase" (the first of its kind in the United States). Furthermore, 1,500 jobs and additional aircraft were directed to the new joint base. Saxton also saved the New Jersey National Guard's 108th Air Refueling Wing from oblivion by working to provide it with a squadron of newer planes.

His other accomplishments include a beach erosion repair project on popular tourist destination Long Beach Island (which saw a 2006 groundbreaking) and a hospital Medicare funding initiative that brought $80 million to New Jersey hospitals in 2005 and 2006.

On May 26, 2006, Saxton reported hearing a loud gunfire-type noise in the Rayburn House Office Building that led to the building being shut down for several hours. It was later determined that the noise was a construction worker discharging a pneumatic hammer in an elevator shaft near the garage. Capitol police officers who subsequently asked the workers to recreate the noise agreed it sounded like gunfire.

On November 9, 2007, Saxton announced that he would not seek reelection in 2008, citing prostate cancer. He was succeeded by Democratic state senator John Adler, who had been Saxton's Democratic opponent in 1990.

Saxton has been a resident of Mount Holly, New Jersey.

== Committee assignments ==
- Armed Services Committee
  - Air and Land Forces Subcommittee (Ranking Member)
  - Terrorism and Conventional Threats and Capabilities Subcommittee
- Natural Resources Committee
  - Subcommittee on Fisheries, Wildlife and Oceans
- Joint Economic Committee (Ranking Member; Chairman)

== Political positions ==
Saxton has been classified as a moderate Republican. The American Conservative Union counts his lifetime score as similar to that of conservative Mississippi Democrat Gene Taylor. In 2006, the nonpartisan National Journal listed him as one of the Congress's centrists. He supported taking action to ensure the long-term solvency of Social Security.

He argued against the estate tax in the Joint Economic Committee Study of 1998. This analysis examined the arguments for and against the federal estate tax and concluded that the estate tax generates costs to taxpayers, the economy and the environment which far exceeds any potential benefit that it might arguably produce.

He is conservative on abortion issues, which earned him a 100% rating by the Christian Coalition from 2003 to 2005. He has voted against bills that would authorize partial birth abortion, taxpayer-funded human embryo experimentation, and human cloning.

However, he supported liberal issues, such as gun control (Brady Bill and a ban on semi-automatic firearms). Saxton is supportive of environmentalism, which led him to be one of the few Republicans that the Sierra Club endorsed in 2000, 2002, 2004 and 2006. He has received generally favorable ratings by other environmental groups. He was endorsed by the League of Conservation Voters, Ocean Champions and the New Jersey Environmental Federation in his 2006 reelection bid. The Audubon Society, the National Wildlife Federation, and the Nature Conservancy have regularly given him high marks and various awards for his work on conservation issues. Saxton also co-founded the bi-partisan Congressional Wildlife Refuge Caucus. Saxton was also supportive of some gay rights measures, including the Employment Non-Discrimination Act and hate crimes bills.

Saxton is a member of both the Republican Main Street Partnership and Republicans for Environmental Protection.

He supported bipartisan issues, such as federal campaign finance reform (Shays-Meehan and McCain-Feingold). He voted against NAFTA, but voted for CAFTA as a means to help reverse abject poverty and hunger, and ease potential political unrest in impoverished Latin America.

As a former public school teacher, he did not support school vouchers.

He endorsed his good friend Duncan Hunter in the 2008 Republican Presidential Primary.

U.S. House of Representatives
| Preceded by Edwin B. Forsythe | Member of the U.S. House of Representatives from New Jersey's 13th congressional district 1984–1993 | Succeeded by Bob Menendez |
| Preceded by Frank Pallone | Member of the U.S. House of Representatives from New Jersey's 3rd congressional district 1993–2009 | Succeeded by John Adler |
U.S. order of precedence (ceremonial)
| Preceded by Grace Napolitano as Former U.S. Representative | Order of precedence of the United States as Former U.S. Representative | Succeeded by Rob Andrews as Former U.S. Representative |
