= Dawn Addiego =

American politician (born 1962)

Dawn Marie Addiego

Member of the New Jersey Senate from the 8th district
- In office December 6, 2010 – January 11, 2022
- Preceded by: Phil Haines
- Succeeded by: Jean Stanfield

Member of the New Jersey General Assembly from the 8th district
- In office January 8, 2008 – December 6, 2010
- Preceded by: Francis L. Bodine; Larry Chatzidakis
- Succeeded by: Pat Delany

Member of the Burlington County Board of Chosen Freeholders
- In office January 1, 2000 – January 8, 2008

Member of the Evesham Township Council
- In office 1993–2000

Personal details
- Born: October 20, 1962 (age 63)
- Party: Democratic (2019–present)
- Other political affiliations: Republican (before 2019)
- Spouse: Dan Clark
- Children: 1
- Education: Villanova University (BS); Widener University (JD)
- Occupation: Politician; lawyer
- Website: Legislative Website

Dawn Marie Addiego (born October 20, 1962) is an American politician who represented the New Jersey's 8th legislative district in the New Jersey Senate from 2010 to 2022. A member of the Democratic Party, she previously served in the General Assembly from January 8, 2008 to November 22, 2010 as a Republican (before changing parties). On November 15, 2010, after Phil Haines was confirmed to serve on the New Jersey Superior Court for Burlington County, that county's Republican committee (of which she was still a member) nominated and appointed Addiego to fill Haines' vacant seat for the remainder of his unexpired term.

== Early life ==
Addiego graduated from Villanova University with a bachelor's degree in accounting. She earned a J.D. from Widener University School of Law in 1987. Addiego served on the Evesham Township Council from 1993 to 2000 and on its Planning Board from 1993 to 1994. She was on the Tri-County Water Quality Management Board of Advisors from 1994 to 2000. She served on the Burlington County Board of Chosen Freeholders from 2000 until 2008.

== New Jersey Assembly ==
While in the Assembly, Addigeo served as the Assistant Republican Whip after taking office in 2008. She also served on the Appropriations Committee and the Higher Education Committee. In March 2009, Addiego, along with fellow Assemblyman Scott Rudder, asked for a 10% cut from her legislative salary in light of New Jersey's current economic crisis.

A legal opinion from the New Jersey Office of Legislative Services found that they were the first lawmakers in New Jersey history to ask to waive part of their salary.

In 2011, the two legislators proposed that the 10% pay cut that they took should be extended to other state legislative, judicial and executive branch employees, including the Governor.

Addiego was a vocal opponent of Governor Jon Corzine's Council on Affordable Housing (COAH) plan to require towns to build a government-set number of affordable housing units. She argued that "COAH's new regulations will drive up property taxes, destroy open space and discourage economic development."

== New Jersey Senate ==
Addiego won her first full term in the New Jersey Senate in November 2011, running unopposed after prospective Democratic Party candidate Carl Lewis was knocked off the ballot because he didn't meet the state's residency requirement. Addiego was re-elected in 2013 and 2017.

=== Committees ===
- Community and Urban Affairs
- Health, Human Services and Senior Citizens
- State Government, Wagering, Tourism & Historic Preservation
- Labor
- Budget and Appropriations

=== Votes on Key Issues ===
- In 2012, Addiego voted against legalizing marriage for same-sex couples
- In 2017, Addiego voted to increase the New Jersey gas tax by 23 cents
- In 2018, Addiego voted against a bill requiring New Jersey employers to provide earned sick leave to their employees
- In 2019, Addiego came out against the legalization of recreational marijuana in New Jersey

=== Party switch ===
On January 28, 2019, Addiego switched political affiliation to the Democratic Party. After Addiego's party switch, 8th District Assemblyman Joe Howarth had allegedly tried to switch his party from Republican to Democrat, and Republican leaders were unable to contact Howarth for two days. The Burlington County Republican Committee subsequently dropped their support for Howarth and endorsed Burlington County Sheriff Jean Stanfield for his seat in the Assembly. Ultimately, Stanfield and incumbent Republican Assemblyman Ryan Peters defeated Howarth in the primary and won the general election.

In 2021, Addiego ran for reelection to the Senate as a Democrat. She was unopposed in the Democratic primary, and despite having a fundraising advantage, narrowly lost to Stanfield in the general election. Addiego later became Superintendent of Elections for Burlington County in late January 2022.

== Election history ==
=== New Jersey Senate ===
New Jersey State Senate elections, 2021
Party	Candidate	Votes	%	±%
Republican	Jean Stanfield	39,648	51.11	
Democratic	Dawn Marie Addiego (incumbent)	37,927	48.89	▼3.31
Total votes		77,575	100	
Republican hold				

New Jersey State Senate elections, 2017
Party	Candidate	Votes	%	±%
Republican	Dawn Marie Addiego (incumbent)	30,795	52.2	▼11.3
Democratic	George B. Youngkin	28,158	47.8	
Republican hold				

New Jersey State Senate elections, 2013
Party	Candidate	Votes	%
Republican	Dawn Marie Addiego (incumbent)	35,894	63.5
Democratic	Javier Vasquez	20,633	36.5
Republican hold			

New Jersey State Senate elections, 2011
Party	Candidate	Votes	%
Republican	Dawn Marie Addiego (incumbent)	22,396	100.0
Republican hold			

=== New Jersey General Assembly ===
New Jersey State Assembly elections, 2009
Party	Candidate	Votes	%
Republican	Dawn Marie Addiego (incumbent)	42,129	31.06
Republican	Scott Rudder (incumbent)	40,679	29.99
Democratic	Debbie Sarcone	26,397	19.46
Democratic	Bill Brown	26,384	19.45
Republican hold			

New Jersey State Assembly elections, 2007
Party	Candidate	Votes	%
Republican	Dawn Marie Addiego	25,310	27.97
Republican	Scott Rudder	25,298	27.96
Democratic	Tracy L. Riley	20,540	22.70
Democratic	Christopher D. Fifis	19,234	21.26
Republican hold			

=== Burlington County Commissioner ===
Burlington County Commissioner Elections, 2005
Party	Candidate	Votes	%
Republican	Dawn Marie Addiego (incumbent)	65,199	27.93
Republican	Aubrey Fenton	64,486	27.66
Democratic	Amy Vasquez	52,524	22.53
Democratic	Dean Buono	50,933	21.84
Republican hold			

Burlington County Freeholder Elections, 2002
Party	Candidate	Votes	%
Republican	Theresa Brown (incumbent)	66,322	29.64
Republican	Dawn Marie Addiego (incumbent)	65,082	29.08
Democratic	John Fratinardo	46,930	20.97
Democratic	John S. Kocubinski	45,446	20.31
Republican hold			

== See also ==
- Party switching in the United States
- List of American politicians who switched parties in office

New Jersey Senate
Preceded by Phil Haines	Member of the New Jersey Senate for the 8th District; December 6, 2010–January 11, 2022	Succeeded by Jean Stanfield
New Jersey General Assembly
Preceded by Francis L. Bodine; Larry Chatzidakis	Member of the New Jersey General Assembly for the 8th District; January 8, 2008–December 6, 2010; With: Scott Rudder	Succeeded by Pat Delany
