= List of mayors of Moorestown, New Jersey =

Mayor of Moorestown
- Incumbent; Quinton Law since January 9, 2025
- Type: Mayor
- Constituting instrument: Code of the Township of Moorestown § 6
- Deputy: Deputy Mayor of Moorestown
- Salary: $2,405–3,500
- Website: Town Council

Moorestown Township, New Jersey was incorporated on March 11, 1922. The municipal government operates within the Faulkner Act (formally known as the Optional Municipal Charter Law) under Council-Manager plan E, which was implemented as of January 1, 1967, based on the recommendations of a Charter Study Commission. A five-member Council is elected at-large on a partisan basis, with each member serving a four-year term of office on a staggered basis, with either two or three seats coming up for election in even years. At a reorganization meeting held in January after each election, the council selects a mayor and a deputy mayor from among its members.

== Mayors ==
Mayor	birth and death	In office	Left office	Notes
Quinton Law	(born c. 1997)	January 9, 2025		Law is first black mayor of Moorestown, New Jersey.
Nicole Gillespie		January 7, 2020	January 9, 2025	
Lisa Petriello	(born May 6, 1979)	2019	2020	
Stacey Jordan	(born September 29, 1970)	2018	2019	Jordan served a previous term during 2013 and is the first and only Mayor to serve multiple terms as Mayor non-consecutively.
Manny Delgado	(born January 23, 1970)	2017	2018	Manny Delgado was the first Hispanic mayor, deputy mayor, and councilmember of Moorestown, New Jersey.
Phil Garwood	(born February 22, 1959)	2016	2017	
Victoria Napolitano	(born August 16, 1988)	2015	2016	Victoria Napolitano was the youngest mayor of Moorestown, New Jersey and youngest woman to become Mayor in New Jersey state history at the age of 26. She was also the first sitting councilmember to give birth while in office.
Chris Chiacchio	(born March 8, 1967)	2014	2015	
Stacey Jordan	(born September 29, 1970)	2013	2014	Stacey Jordan was the first female mayor of Moorestown, New Jersey. She later served a second term during 2018 and is the first and only Mayor to serve multiple terms non-consecutively.
John Button	(born November 14, 1942)	2011	2012	
Daniel Roccato	(born July 20, 1961)	2009	2010	
Kevin E. Aberant	(born November 7, 1969)	2005	2008	He was the first Democratic mayor of Moorestown, New Jersey.
Michael L. Sanyour	(1931-2017)	2003	2004	
Howard Miller	(born August 2, 1937)	1997	2002	
Walter T. Maahs,	(1927-2011)	1988	1996	
Francis L. Bodine	(born January 10, 1936)	1981	1987	
James Euel Palmer	(1932-2000)	1976	1980	
William A. Angus, Jr.	(1923-2006)	1971	1976	
John L. Call		1969	1970	
Charles Walton		1967	1968	
Albert Ellis		1962	1966	
Edwin Bell Forsythe	(1916-1984)	1957	1962	
William J. Hall, Jr.		1954	1956	
Allen Nixon		1943	1953	
Fred P. Smith		1938	1942	
Benjamin Haines		1935	1937	
John C. Dudley		1932	1934	
Frederick W. Grube	(1871-1961)	1929	1931	
