= Larry Chatzidakis =

American Republican Party politician

Member of the New Jersey General Assembly from the 8th district
- In office January 14, 1997 – January 8, 2008 Serving with Francis L. Bodine
- Preceded by: Martha W. Bark
- Succeeded by: Dawn Marie Addiego; Scott Rudder

Personal details
- Born: June 24, 1949 (age 77)
- Party: Republican

Larry Chatzidakis (born June 24, 1949) is a Greek-American Republican Party politician, who served in the New Jersey General Assembly from 1997 to 2008, where he represented the 8th legislative district. Chatzidakis had been appointed in 1997 to fill the Assembly seat vacated by Martha W. Bark upon her selection to fill a New Jersey Senate vacancy.

Chatzidakis served in the Assembly on the Environment and Solid Waste and the Military and Veterans' Affairs Committees. In the Assembly, Chatzidakis was the sponsor of a bill to prohibit use of cell phones while driving, and a resolution to urge the Federal Aviation Administration to replace Atlantic City Bader Field with Hammonton Municipal Airport as the reliever airport for Atlantic City International Airport. Chatzidakis served on the Mount Laurel Township Council from 1985 to 2000 and as its Mayor of Mount Laurel Township, New Jersey in 1988, 1992, 1996, and 2000. He served on the Burlington County Board of Chosen Freeholders from 1995–1997. Chatzidakis received an A.B. degree from Villanova University in Psychology. He is a resident of Mount Laurel Township.
