= C. H. v. Oliva =

Religious freedom case heard before the US Court of Appeals for the Third Circuit

- Court: United States Court of Appeals for the Third Circuit
- Full case name: C. H. v. Oliva et al.
- Decided: August 28, 2000
- Citation: 226 F.3d 198

Case history
- Prior history: 990 F. Supp. 341 (D.N.J. 1997); 195 F.3d 167 (3rd Cir. 1999)

Court membership
- Judges sitting: Edward R. Becker, Dolores Korman Sloviter, Carol Los Mansmann, Morton Ira Greenberg, Anthony Joseph Scirica, Richard Lowell Nygaard, Samuel Alito, Jane Richards Roth, Theodore A. McKee, Marjorie O. Rendell, Maryanne Trump Barry, Walter King Stapleton, (en banc)

Case opinions
- Majority: Stapleton
- Dissent: Alito

C. H. v. Oliva, 226 F.3d 198 (3d Cir. 2000), was a religious freedom case in which mother Carol Hood sued Grace Oliva, her son Zachary's first grade teacher, and related administrators in the Medford Township Public Schools for not allowing the child to read a section of the Bible in class. His kindergarten class had made Thanksgiving paintings the year prior, and his was taken down and subsequently reposted in a less noticeable place for its religious content. The poster was called "I'm Thankful for Jesus." Carol Hood met with Principal Gail Pratt, who defended the school's decisions. She said that reading the story "was the equivalent of 'praying'." Noting that she had received complaints in the past, Ms. Pratt stated that the story "might upset Muslim, Hindu or Jewish students." She added that there was "no place in the public school for the reading of the Bible" and advised: " '[M]aybe you should consider taking your child out of public school, since you don't appear to be public school material.' " Ms. Pratt noted that "her position was fully supported by various legal authorities."

The district court judge ruled that the teacher had exercised reasonable judgment in refusing to allow the book to be read in class. He agreed with the lower court that a first grader would not be able to distinguish between a student reading the Bible as constitutionally-protected free expression, and the teacher endorsing a religion by interrupting class to allow him to read it. Under the establishment clause, other students have a right to be free from religious endorsement by the government.

Supreme Court Justice Samuel Alito, at the time an appeals court judge, agreed with the district court judge on the matter of the book. However, he dissented that the replacement of the poster inhibited Zachary's right to free expression.

The appeals court, sitting en banc, split 6-6. The ruling defaulted to the district court, which had held against the Hoods.

In June 2001, the Supreme Court of the United States declined to hear the case.
