= John A. Sweeney =

American politician (born 1941)

Member of the New Jersey General Assembly from the 8th Legislative District
- In office January 8, 1974 – January 13, 1976 Serving with Clifford W. Snedeker
- Preceded by: District created
- Succeeded by: Jim Saxton

Personal details
- Born: November 6, 1941 (age 83); Trenton, New Jersey
- Political party: Democratic

John A. Sweeney (born November 6, 1941) is an American Democratic Party politician who served a single two-year term in the New Jersey General Assembly from the 8th Legislative District from 1974 to 1976.

A resident of Florence Township, New Jersey, Sweeney graduated from Seton Hall University School of Law. After serving in the General Assembly, Sweeney served as the director of the New Jersey Division of Gaming Enforcement before serving for eight years as the assignment judge in Burlington County, New Jersey. He was appointed by Stuart Rabner, Chief Justice of the New Jersey Supreme Court, to serve a term expiring in February 2021 on the Council on Local Mandates, and has served as the council's acting chair.

Until the election of Democrat Andrea Katz in 2023, Sweeney had been the only Democrat to have been elected to represent the 8th district. Sweeney had been elected for a single term in 1973, which saw a Democratic wave after the Watergate scandal.
