= New Jersey's 8th legislative district =

American legislative district

- Senator: Latham Tiver (R)
- Assembly members: Andrea Katz (D); Anthony Angelozzi (D)
- Registration: 32.27% Republican; 31.84% Democratic; 34.80% unaffiliated
- Demographics: 74.0% White; 10.1% Black/African American; 0.2% Native American; 4.1% Asian; 0.1% Hawaiian/Pacific Islander; 3.3% Other race; 8.1% Two or more races; 9.0% Hispanic
- Population: 221,840
- Voting-age population: 175,200
- Registered voters: 177,065

New Jersey's 8th legislative district is one of 40 in the New Jersey Legislature, covering the Burlington County municipalities of Bass River, Chesterfield Township, Eastampton Township, Evesham Township, Hainesport Township, Lumberton Township, Mansfield Township, Medford Township, Medford Lakes Borough, Mount Holly Township, New Hanover, Pemberton Borough, Pemberton Township, Shamong Township, Southampton Township, Springfield Township, Tabernacle Township, Washington Township, Westampton Township, Woodland Township, and Wrightstown Borough; and the Atlantic County municipalities of Egg Harbor City, New Jersey, Folsom, Hammonton, and Mullica.

== Demographic characteristics ==
As of the 2020 United States census, the district had a population of 221,840, of whom 175,200 (79.0%) were of voting age. The racial makeup of the district was 164,132 (74.0%) White, 22,489 (10.1%) African American, 541 (0.2%) Native American, 9,191 (4.1%) Asian, 141 (0.1%) Pacific Islander, 7,333 (3.3%) from some other race, and 18,013 (8.1%) from two or more races. Hispanic or Latino of any race were 20,055 (9.0%) of the population.

The district had 187,411 registered voters as of February 1, 2025, of whom 66,832 (35.7%) were registered as unaffiliated, 58,966 (31.5%) were registered as Democrats, 59,477 (31.7%) were registered as Republicans, and 2,136 (1.1%) were registered to other parties.

== Political representation ==
For the 2026–2027 session, the 8th legislative district of the New Jersey Legislature is represented in the New Jersey Senate by Latham Tiver (R, Southampton Township) and in the General Assembly by Anthony Angelozzi (D, Hammonton) and Andrea Katz (D, Chesterfield Township).

The legislative district overlaps with 2nd and 3rd congressional districts.

== 1965–1973 ==
During the period of time after the 1964 Supreme Court decision in Reynolds v. Sims and before the establishment of a 40-district legislature in 1973, the 8th district encompassed the entirety of Somerset County. During the three Senate elections held during this period (1965, 1967, and 1971), Republicans won all three races. Incumbent Senator William E. Ozzard won reelection in 1965 for a two-year term (though he resigned on July 10, 1967), while for the next two elections, Raymond Bateman was victorious for both elections.

In the terms from 1967 until 1973, the 8th district sent two members to the General Assembly. In all elections for two-year terms, Republicans won both seats. John H. Ewing was one victor in the three regular elections (1967, 1969, 1971), while Webster B. Todd Jr. (son of Webster B. Todd, brother of Christine Todd Whitman) served one term from 1968 until 1970, Millicent Fenwick was elected in 1969 and 1971, but resigned on December 14, 1972, to become head of the New Jersey Division of Consumer Affairs, and Victor A. Rizzolo was elected in a special election on January 30, 1973, to complete her term.

== District composition since 1973 ==
When the Legislature was switched to 40 equal-population districts statewide, the 8th district created for the 1973 elections was an uncompact district in Burlington, Ocean, Monmouth, and Mercer counties. With the Keith line as a center spine, the district had branches to Medford Township, Manchester Township, Florence Township, Roosevelt, East Windsor Township, and Lawrence Township. In the 1980s, the 8th became inclusive of most of Burlington County stretching from Washington Township north to Bordentown. Following the 1990 census, the district expanded out of Burlington County to Camden County (Winslow Township, Waterford Township, and Chesilhurst) and Atlantic County (Hammonton and Folsom) with the Burlington County portion including suburban townships of Medford, Evesham, Moorestown, Mount Laurel, and Southampton. The 2001 redistricting returned the district to being Burlington only again keeping it through the center of the county. The 2011 reapportionment brought Hammonton into the district while the 2021 reapportionment brought in more Atlantic County municipalities and removed all Camden County municipalities. In 2023, Democrats won one assembly seat thereby marking the first time they won a seat through an election since 1973.

== Election history ==
Session	Senate	General Assembly	
1974–1975	Barry T. Parker (R)	John A. Sweeney (D)	Clifford W. Snedeker (R)
1976–1977	Barry T. Parker (R)	Jim Saxton (R)	Clifford W. Snedeker (R)
1978–1979	Barry T. Parker (R)	Jim Saxton (R)	Clifford W. Snedeker (R)
1980–1981	Barry T. Parker (R)	Jim Saxton (R)	Clifford W. Snedeker (R)
1982–1983	Jim Saxton (R)	C. William Haines (R)	Robert J. Meyer (R)
1984–1985	Jim Saxton (R) (Note: Elected to and seated in the U.S. House of Representatives on November 6, 1984)	C. William Haines (R) (Note: Elected to Senate in a December 27, 1984 special election, seated on January 8, 1985)	Robert J. Meyer (R) (Note: Died July 14, 1984)
1984–1985	Jim Saxton (R)	C. William Haines (R)	Harold L. Colburn Jr. (R) (Note: Elected in September 11, 1984 special election)
1984–1985	C. William Haines (R)	Robert C. Shinn Jr. (R) (Note: Elected on February 19, 1985 special election)	Harold L. Colburn Jr. (R)
1986–1987	C. William Haines (R)	Robert C. Shinn Jr. (R)	Harold L. Colburn Jr. (R)
1988–1989	C. William Haines (R)	Robert C. Shinn Jr. (R)	Harold L. Colburn Jr. (R)
1990–1991	C. William Haines (R)	Robert C. Shinn Jr. (R)	Harold L. Colburn Jr. (R)
1992–1993	C. William Haines (R)	Robert C. Shinn Jr. (R)	Harold L. Colburn Jr. (R)
1994–1995	C. William Haines (R) (Note: Died December 18, 1996)	Robert C. Shinn Jr. (R) (Note: Resigned February 8, 1994 to become New Jersey Department of Environmental Protection Commissioner)	Harold L. Colburn Jr. (R) (Note: Resigned on March 1, 1995 to become head of State Medical Examiner Board)
1994–1995	C. William Haines (R)	Francis L. Bodine (R) (Note: Appointed to the Assembly on February 28, 1994, elected in November 1994 special election to complete term)	Harold L. Colburn Jr. (R)
1994–1995	C. William Haines (R)	Francis L. Bodine (R)	Martha W. Bark (R) (Note: Appointed to Assembly on March 13, 1995)
1996–1997	C. William Haines (R)	Francis L. Bodine (R)	Martha W. Bark (R) (Note: Appointed to Senate on January 14, 1997)
1996–1997	Martha W. Bark (R)	Francis L. Bodine (R)	Larry Chatzidakis (R) (Note: Appointed to Assembly on January 14, 1997)
1998–1999	Martha W. Bark (R)	Francis L. Bodine (R)	Larry Chatzidakis (R)
2000–2001	Martha W. Bark (R)	Francis L. Bodine (R)	Larry Chatzidakis (R)
2002–2003	Martha W. Bark (R)	Francis L. Bodine (R)	Larry Chatzidakis (R)
2004–2005	Martha W. Bark (R)	Francis L. Bodine (R)	Larry Chatzidakis (R)
2006–2007	Martha W. Bark (R)	Francis L. Bodine (R)	Larry Chatzidakis (R)
2006–2007	Martha W. Bark (R)	Francis L. Bodine (D) (Note: Switched parties on April 5, 2007)	Larry Chatzidakis (R)
2008–2009	Phil Haines (R) (Note: Appointed to be a judge on the New Jersey Superior Court, October 18, 2010)	Dawn Marie Addiego (R)	Scott Rudder (R)
2010–2011	Phil Haines (R)	Dawn Marie Addiego (R) (Note: Appointed to the Senate on November 22, 2010)	Scott Rudder (R)
2010–2011	Dawn Marie Addiego (R)	Pat Delany (R) (Note: Appointed to the Assembly on December 13, 2010; resigned August 12, 2011)	Scott Rudder (R)
2010–2011	Dawn Marie Addiego (R)	Gerry Nardello (R) (Note: Appointed to the Assembly on November 21, 2011)	Scott Rudder (R)
2012–2013	Dawn Marie Addiego (R)	Christopher J. Brown (R)	Scott Rudder (R)
2014–2015	Dawn Marie Addiego (R)	Christopher J. Brown (R)	Maria Rodriguez-Gregg (R)
2016–2017	Dawn Marie Addiego (R)	Joe Howarth (R)	Maria Rodriguez-Gregg (R)
2018–2019	Dawn Marie Addiego (R)	Joe Howarth (R)	Ryan Peters (R)
2018–2019	Dawn Marie Addiego (D) (Note: Switched parties on January 28, 2019)	Joe Howarth (R)	Ryan Peters (R)
2020–2021	Dawn Marie Addiego (D)	Jean Stanfield (R)	Ryan Peters (R)
2022–2023	Jean Stanfield (R)	Michael Torrissi (R)	Brandon Umba (R)
2024–2025	Latham Tiver (R)	Michael Torrissi (R)	Andrea Katz (D)
2026-2027	Latham Tiver (R)	Anthony Angelozzi (D)	Andrea Katz (D)

== Election results, 1973–present ==
=== Senate ===
2023 New Jersey general election
Party	Candidate	Votes	%	±%
Republican	Latham Tiver	28,394	51.0	▼0.1
Democratic	Gaye Burton	27,236	49.0	▲0.1
Total votes		55,630	100.0	

2021 New Jersey general election
Party	Candidate	Votes	%	±%
Republican	Jean Stanfield	39,648	51.1	▼1.1
Democratic	Dawn Marie Addiego	37,927	48.9	▲1.1 (▼3.3)
Total votes		77,575	100.0	

New Jersey general election, 2017
Party	Candidate	Votes	%	±%
Republican	Dawn Marie Addiego	30,795	52.2	▼11.3
Democratic	George B. Youngkin	28,158	47.8	▲11.3
Total votes		58,953	100.0	

New Jersey general election, 2013
Party	Candidate	Votes	%	±%
Republican	Dawn Marie Addiego	35,894	63.5	▼36.5
Democratic	Javier Vasquez	20,633	36.5	N/A
Total votes		56,527	100.0	

2011 New Jersey general election
Party	Candidate	Votes	%
Republican	Dawn Marie Addiego	22,396	100.0
Total votes		22,396	100.0

2007 New Jersey general election
Party	Candidate	Votes	%	±%
Republican	Phil Haines	28,148	60.9	▼6.0
Democratic	Francis L. Bodine	18,066	39.1	▲6.0
Total votes		46,214	100.0	

2003 New Jersey general election
Party	Candidate	Votes	%	±%
Republican	Martha W. Bark	28,047	66.9	▲6.2
Democratic	Thomas J. Price	13,865	33.1	▼6.2
Total votes		41,912	100.0	

2001 New Jersey general election
Party	Candidate	Votes	%
Republican	Martha W. Bark	35,276	60.7
Democratic	Gary E. Haman	22,865	39.3
Total votes		58,141	100.0

1997 New Jersey general election
Party	Candidate	Votes	%	±%
Republican	Martha W. Bark	34,597	54.9	▼6.1
Democratic	Marie Hall	28,401	45.1	▲6.1
Total votes		62,998	100.0	

1993 New Jersey general election
Party	Candidate	Votes	%	±%
Republican	C. William Haines	36,767	61.0	▼5.3
Democratic	Mary P. McKeon Stosuy	23,480	39.0	▲5.3
Total votes		60,247	100.0	

1991 New Jersey general election
Party	Candidate	Votes	%
Republican	C. William Haines	28,850	66.3
Democratic	Harvey Dinerman	14,644	33.7
Total votes		43,494	100.0

1987 New Jersey general election
Party	Candidate	Votes	%	±%
Republican	C. William Haines	28,731	66.5	▼5.2
Democratic	James B. Smith	14,444	33.5	▲5.2
Total votes		43,175	100.0	

Special election, December 27, 1984
Party	Candidate	Votes	%	±%
Republican	C. William Haines	9,124	71.7	▲8.6
Democratic	Matthew R. McCrink	3,608	28.3	▼8.6
Total votes		12,732	100.0	

1983 New Jersey general election
Party	Candidate	Votes	%	±%
Republican	H. James Saxton	22,714	63.1	▼2.6
Democratic	Charles H. Ryan	13,303	36.9	▲2.6
Total votes		36,017	100.0	

1981 New Jersey general election
Party	Candidate	Votes	%
Republican	H. James Saxton	33,132	65.7
Democratic	Raymond J. Storck	17,314	34.3
Total votes		50,446	100.0

1977 New Jersey general election
Party	Candidate	Votes	%	±%
Republican	Barry T. Parker	30,042	55.4	▲2.6
Democratic	Charles H. Ryan	24,168	44.6	▼2.6
Total votes		54,210	100.0	

1973 New Jersey general election
Party	Candidate	Votes	%
Republican	Barry T. Parker	23,422	52.8
Democratic	Salvatoro L. DiDonato	20,923	47.2
Total votes		44,345	100.0

=== General Assembly ===
2025 New Jersey general election
Party	Candidate	Votes	%	±%
Democratic	Anthony Angelozzi	50,168	26.3	▲1.4
Democratic	Andrea Katz	50,036	26.2	▲1.1
Republican	Michael Torrissi Jr.	46,262	24.3	▼1.0
Republican	Brandon Umba	44,300	23.2	▼1.6
Total votes		110,339	100.0	

2023 New Jersey general election
Party	Candidate	Votes	%	±%
Republican	Michael Torrissi Jr.	27,881	25.3	▼1.2
Democratic	Andrea Katz	27,636	25.5	▲1.4
Democratic	Anthony Angelozzi	27,438	24.9	▲0.9
Republican	Brandon Umba	27,384	24.8	▼0.7
Total votes		110,339	100.0	

2021 New Jersey general election
Party	Candidate	Votes	%	±%
Republican	Michael Torrissi Jr.	40,467	26.5	▲1.1
Republican	Brandon Umba	39,039	25.5	▲0.3
Democratic	Allison Eckel	36,828	24.1	▼0.1
Democratic	Mark Natale	36,634	24.0	▲0.6
Total votes		152,968	100.0	

2019 New Jersey general election
Party	Candidate	Votes	%	±%
Republican	Jean Stanfield	25,050	25.4	▲0.3
Republican	Ryan Peters	24,906	25.2	▲0.2
Democratic	Gina LaPlaca	23,895	24.2	▼0.5
Democratic	Mark Natale	23,092	23.4	▼1.2
MAGA Conservative	Tom Giangiulio Jr.	1,777	1.8	N/A
Total votes		98,720	100.0	

New Jersey general election, 2017
Party	Candidate	Votes	%	±%
Republican	Joe Howarth	28,841	25.1	▼24.8
Republican	Ryan Peters	28,671	25.0	▼25.1
Democratic	Joanne Schwartz	28,321	24.7	N/A
Democratic	Maryann Merlino	28,196	24.6	N/A
No Status Quo	Ryan T. Calhoun	753	0.7	N/A
Total votes		114,782	100.0	

New Jersey general election, 2015
Party	Candidate	Votes	%	±%
Republican	Maria Rodriguez-Gregg	18,317	50.1	▲20.9
Republican	Joe Howarth	18,234	49.9	▲18.9
Total votes		36,551	100.0	

New Jersey general election, 2013
Party	Candidate	Votes	%	±%
Republican	Chris Brown	34,293	31.0	▲0.9
Republican	Maria Rodriguez-Gregg	32,360	29.2	▼0.7
Democratic	Robert L. McGowan	22,461	20.3	▲1.3
Democratic	Ava Markey	21,665	19.6	▲1.2
Total votes		110,779	100.0	

New Jersey general election, 2011
Party	Candidate	Votes	%
Republican	Christopher J. Brown	19,799	30.1
Republican	Scott Rudder	19,649	29.9
Democratic	Pamela A. Finnerty	12,480	19.0
Democratic	Anita Lovely	12,107	18.4
Legalize Marijuana	Robert Edward Forchion Jr.	1,653	2.5
Total votes		65,688	100.0

New Jersey general election, 2009
Party	Candidate	Votes	%	±%
Republican	Dawn Marie Addiego	42,129	31.1	▲3.1
Republican	Scott Rudder	40,679	30.0	▲2.0
Democratic	Debbie Sarcone	26,397	19.5	▼3.2
Democratic	Bill Brown	26,384	19.5	▼1.8
Write-In	Personal choice	34	0.03	N/A
Total votes		135,623	100.0	

New Jersey general election, 2007
Party	Candidate	Votes	%	±%
Republican	Dawn Marie Addiego	25,310	28.0	▼1.5
Republican	Scott Rudder	25,298	28.0	▼0.4
Democratic	Tracy L. Riley	20,540	22.7	▲1.9
Democratic	Christopher D. Fifis	19,234	21.3	▲0.6
Total votes		90,382	100.0	

New Jersey general election, 2005
Party	Candidate	Votes	%	±%
Republican	Francis L. Bodine	37,300	29.5	▼4.1
Republican	Larry Chatzidakis	35,986	28.4	▼4.3
Democratic	Donald G. Hartman	26,377	20.8	▲3.5
Democratic	Sandy Weinstein	26,153	20.7	▲4.4
Independent	John J. White	751	0.6	N/A
Total votes		126,567	100.0	

New Jersey general election, 2003
Party	Candidate	Votes	%	±%
Republican	Francis L. Bodine	27,513	33.6	▲3.2
Republican	Larry Chatzidakis	26,785	32.7	▲3.1
Democratic	Donald Hartman	14,191	17.3	▼3.1
Democratic	Kenneth Solarz	13,316	16.3	▼3.3
Total votes		81,805	100.0	

New Jersey general election, 2001
Party	Candidate	Votes	%
Republican	Francis L. Bodine	34,972	30.4
Republican	Larry Chatzidakis	34,037	29.6
Democratic	Carol A. Murphy	23,496	20.4
Democratic	Thomas J. Price	22,622	19.6
Total votes		115,127	100.0

New Jersey general election, 1999
Party	Candidate	Votes	%	±%
Republican	Francis L. Bodine	23,094	30.0	▲1.2
Republican	Larry Chatzidakis	22,183	28.8	▲1.6
Democratic	Marie Hall	15,576	20.2	▼1.1
Democratic	George Fallon	15,143	19.7	▼1.1
Legalize Marijuana	Edward "NJWeedman" Forchion	947	1.2	N/A
Total votes		76,943	100.0	

New Jersey general election, 1997
Party	Candidate	Votes	%	±%
Republican	Francis L. Bodine	35,865	28.8	▲2.9
Republican	Larry Chatzidakis	33,871	27.2	▲1.5
Democratic	James B. Smith	26,463	21.3	▼0.1
Democratic	Robert S. Shestack	25,947	20.8	▼0.3
Libertarian	Janice Presser, PhD.	2,385	1.9	▼0.7
Total votes		124,531	100.0	

New Jersey general election, 1995
Party	Candidate	Votes	%	±%
Republican	Francis L. Bodine	18,129	25.9	▼4.3
Republican	Martha W. Bark	17,994	25.7	▼4.7
Democratic	Russell H. Bates	14,983	21.4	▲1.7
Democratic	Michael W. Kwasnik	14,787	21.1	▲1.4
Libertarian	Janice Presser, PhD, RN, CNS	1,846	2.6	N/A
Conservative	Richard J. Lynch	1,400	2.0	N/A
Conservative	Laurie J. Lynch	984	1.4	N/A
Total votes		70,123	100.0	

Special election, November 8, 1994
Party	Candidate	Votes	%
Republican	Francis L. Bodine	30,572	57.5
Democratic	Mary McKeon Stosuy	20,265	38.1
United We Serve	Brian D. Fitzgerald	1,429	2.7
Conservative	Richard J. Lynch	864	1.6
Total votes		53,130	100.0

New Jersey general election, 1993
Party	Candidate	Votes	%	±%
Republican	Harold L. Colburn	36,157	30.4	▼1.9
Republican	Robert C. Shinn, Jr.	36,022	30.2	▼2.3
Democratic	Cesare D. Napoliello	23,514	19.7	▲1.7
Democratic	Harvey Dinerman	23,425	19.7	▲2.5
Total votes		119,118	100.0	

1991 New Jersey general election
Party	Candidate	Votes	%
Republican	Robert C. Shinn	27,834	32.5
Republican	Harold L. Colburn	27,631	32.3
Democratic	James S. Brophy	15,374	18.0
Democratic	Arthur J. Zeichner	14,726	17.2
Total votes		85,565	100.0

1989 New Jersey general election
Party	Candidate	Votes	%	±%
Republican	Harold L. Colburn	34,090	28.9	▼4.6
Republican	Robert C. Shinn, Jr.	34,007	28.8	▼4.3
Democratic	Jerome A. Sweeney	25,199	21.4	▲4.4
Democratic	Sanford Schneider	24,657	20.9	▲4.5
Total votes		117,953	100.0	

1987 New Jersey general election
Party	Candidate	Votes	%	±%
Republican	Harold L. Colburn	28,175	33.5	▼1.3
Republican	Robert C. Shinn	27,800	33.1	▼1.6
Democratic	Thomas Long	14,315	17.0	▲1.5
Democratic	H.B. (Scoop) Slack	13,741	16.4	▲1.7
Total votes		84,031	100.0	

1985 New Jersey general election
Party	Candidate	Votes	%	±%
Republican	Harold L. Colburn, Jr.	29,150	34.8	▲3.8
Republican	Robert C. Shinn, Jr.	29,085	34.7	▲3.2
Democratic	Claire B. Cohen	12,971	15.5	▼3.6
Democratic	Harrison B. Slack	12,285	14.7	▼3.7
Socialist Labor	Bernardo S. Doganiero	189	0.2	N/A
Socialist Labor	Paul Ferguson	170	0.2	N/A
Total votes		83,850	100.0	

Special election, February 19, 1985
Party	Candidate	Votes	%
Republican	Robert C. Shinn	6,239	77.3
Democratic	Marvin F. Matlack	1,833	22.7
Total votes		8,072	100.0

Special election, September 11, 1984
Party	Candidate	Votes	%
Republican	Harold L. Colburn, Jr.	7,883	60.1
Democratic	Philip E. Haines	5,230	39.9
Total votes		13,113	100.0

New Jersey general election, 1983
Party	Candidate	Votes	%	±%
Republican	C. William Haines	22,183	31.5	▼0.8
Republican	Robert J. Meyer	21,798	31.0	▼0.2
Democratic	Robert Mitchell	13,432	19.1	▲0.6
Democratic	Stephen D. Benowitz	12,929	18.4	▲0.5
Total votes		70,342	100.0	

New Jersey general election, 1981
Party	Candidate	Votes	%
Republican	C. William Haines	32,043	32.3
Republican	Robert J. Meyer	31,001	31.2
Democratic	William “Billy” Lang	18,398	18.5
Democratic	Stephen D. Benowitz	17,782	17.9
Total votes		99,224	100.0

New Jersey general election, 1979
Party	Candidate	Votes	%	±%
Republican	H. James Saxton	27,104	28.4	▲0.7
Republican	Clifford W. Snedeker	26,162	27.4	▼1.3
Democratic	Joseph R. Malone III	22,686	23.8	▲1.7
Democratic	Vincent D’Elia	18,907	19.8	▲1.7
Socialist Labor	Paul Ferguson	543	0.6	N/A
Total votes		95,402	100.0	

New Jersey general election, 1977
Party	Candidate	Votes	%	±%
Republican	Clifford W. Snedeker	30,730	28.7	▼0.4
Republican	H. James Saxton	29,655	27.7	▲0.8
Democratic	Stephen J. Zielinski, Jr.	23,723	22.1	▼1.5
Democratic	Samuel N. Barressi	23,023	21.5	▲1.2
Total votes		107,131	100.0	

New Jersey general election, 1975
Party	Candidate	Votes	%	±%
Republican	Clifford W. Snedeker	26,888	29.1	▲3.6
Republican	H. James Saxton	24,831	26.9	▲2.7
Democratic	John A. Sweeney	21,813	23.6	▼3.3
Democratic	Martha Jamieson Crowley	18,732	20.3	▼3.1
Total votes		92,264	100.0	

New Jersey general election, 1973
Party	Candidate	Votes	%
Democratic	John A. Sweeney	23,414	26.9
Republican	Clifford W. Snedeker	22,203	25.5
Republican	H. Kenneth Wilkie	21,044	24.2
Democratic	Elmer D’Imperio	20,358	23.4
Total votes		87,019	100.0

== Election results, 1965–1973 ==
=== Senate ===
1965 New Jersey general election
Party	Candidate	Votes	%
Republican	William E. Ozzard	39,596	50.3
Democratic	Arthur S. Meredith	39,185	49.7
Total votes		78,781	100.0

1967 New Jersey general election
Party	Candidate	Votes	%
Republican	Raymond H. Bateman	35,223	68.0
Democratic	Thomas Ryan	15,188	29.3
Conservative	Robert K. Haelig, Sr.	1,379	2.7
Total votes		51,790	100.0

1971 New Jersey general election
Party	Candidate	Votes	%
Republican	Raymond H. Bateman	37,017	70.9
Democratic	Benjamin Levine	15,167	29.1
Total votes		52,184	100.0

=== General Assembly ===
New Jersey general election, 1967
Party	Candidate	Votes	%
Republican	John H. Ewing	32,409	32.0
Republican	Webster B. Todd, Jr.	31,618	31.2
Democratic	B. Thomas Leahy	18,603	18.3
Democratic	Harvey M. Onore	16,054	15.8
Conservative	Kenneth R. Kane	1,418	1.4
Conservative	Oakley T. Wayman	1,317	1.3
Total votes		101,419	100.0

New Jersey general election, 1969
Party	Candidate	Votes	%
Republican	John H. Ewing	41,562	34.2
Republican	Millicent H. Fenwick	40,341	33.2
Democratic	David Linett	18,723	15.4
Democratic	Alfred A. Wicklund	18,507	15.2
Independent Party	Oakley T. Wayman	1,187	1.0
Independent Party	Dorothy Stamile	1,157	1.0
Total votes		121,477	100.0

New Jersey general election, 1971
Party	Candidate	Votes	%
Republican	John H. Ewing	31,768	31.4
Republican	Millicent H. Fenwick	30,790	30.4
Democratic	Anthony L. Curcio	20,891	20.6
Democratic	Leon E. Cohen	17,786	17.6
Total votes		101,235	100.0

Special election, January 30, 1973
Party	Candidate	Votes	%
Republican	Victor Rizzolo	6,696	51.5
Democratic	Michael Imbriani	5,816	44.7
American	Anthony Medieros	491	3.8
Total votes		13,003	100.0
