= Clifford W. Snedeker =

American politician

Member of the New Jersey General Assembly from the 8th district
- In office January 8, 1974 – January 12, 1982 Serving with John A. Sweeney and Jim Saxton
- Preceded by: John H. Ewing; Victor A. Rizzolo
- Succeeded by: C. William Haines; Robert J. Meyer

Personal details
- Born: January 6, 1931 Lawrenceville, New Jersey
- Died: February 27, 1996 (aged 65)
- Party: Republican
- Spouse: Alvena Snedeker

Clifford W. Snedeker (January 6, 1931 – February 27, 1996) was an American politician who served in the New Jersey General Assembly from the 8th Legislative District from 1974 to 1982. He later became director of the New Jersey Motor Vehicle Commission, where he implemented a seat belt mandate in 1985.
