= Robert C. Shinn Jr. =

American politician (1937–2023)

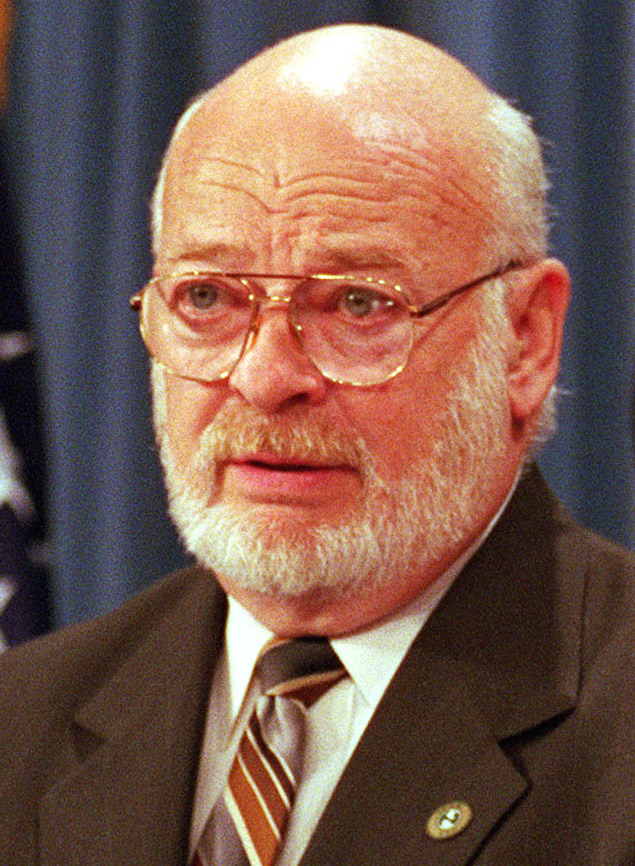

Commissioner of the New Jersey Department of Environmental Protection
- In office February 7, 1994 – January 15, 2002
- Governor: Christine Todd Whitman; Donald DiFrancesco
- Preceded by: Jeanne Fox
- Succeeded by: Bradley M. Campbell

Member of the New Jersey General Assembly from the 8th district
- In office February 20, 1985 – February 8, 1994
- Preceded by: C. William Haines
- Succeeded by: Francis L. Bodine

Personal details
- Born: November 28, 1937 Mount Holly, New Jersey, U.S.
- Died: May 5, 2023 (aged 85)
- Party: Republican

Robert C. Shinn Jr. (November 28, 1937 – May 5, 2023) was an American politician who served in the New Jersey General Assembly from the 8th Legislative District from 1985 to 1994.

Born in Mount Holly, New Jersey, Shinn attended Rancocas Valley Regional High School and Drexel Institute of Technology (since renamed as Drexel University). He left college early to serve in the United States Army during the Korean War as an aircraft mechanic. He served as mayor of Hainesport Township in 1973 and 1974, and took office on the Burlington County Board of Chosen Freeholders in 1977, leaving in 1985 to take office in the State Assembly. In February 1994, Governor Christine Todd Whitman appointed Shinn Commissioner of the New Jersey Department of Environmental Protection, and he served in that role until January 2002.

Shinn died on May 5, 2023, at the age of 85. Governor Phil Murphy ordered flags to fly at half-staff in Shinn's honor.
