= Swedes Run =

River in New Jersey, United States

Coordinates: 40°01′48″N 74°58′42″W

Swedes Run (or Swede Run) is a river in Burlington County, New Jersey. Swedes Run drains an area of 3.63 square miles. Swedes Run drains into the Delaware River, and is approximately 11.95 miles long.

== Water quality ==
Swedes Run is considered an impaired body of water, due to higher-than-acceptable levels of arsenic, pathogens, oxygen depletion, and polychlorinated biphenyls. The probable source of the arsenic is from the agriculture near the river, and the probable source of the other impaired conditions would be from urban runoff.

Upstream, the river's water quality improves, and at a certain upstream site, the river was given a score of 146, or suboptimal, on its habitat analysis. This has improved from recent years where it had been given a score of 62 on its habitat analysis, which would translate to very little or marginal habitat.
