= Kirby's Mill =

Historic grist mill in New Jersey, USA

- U.S. National Register of Historic Places
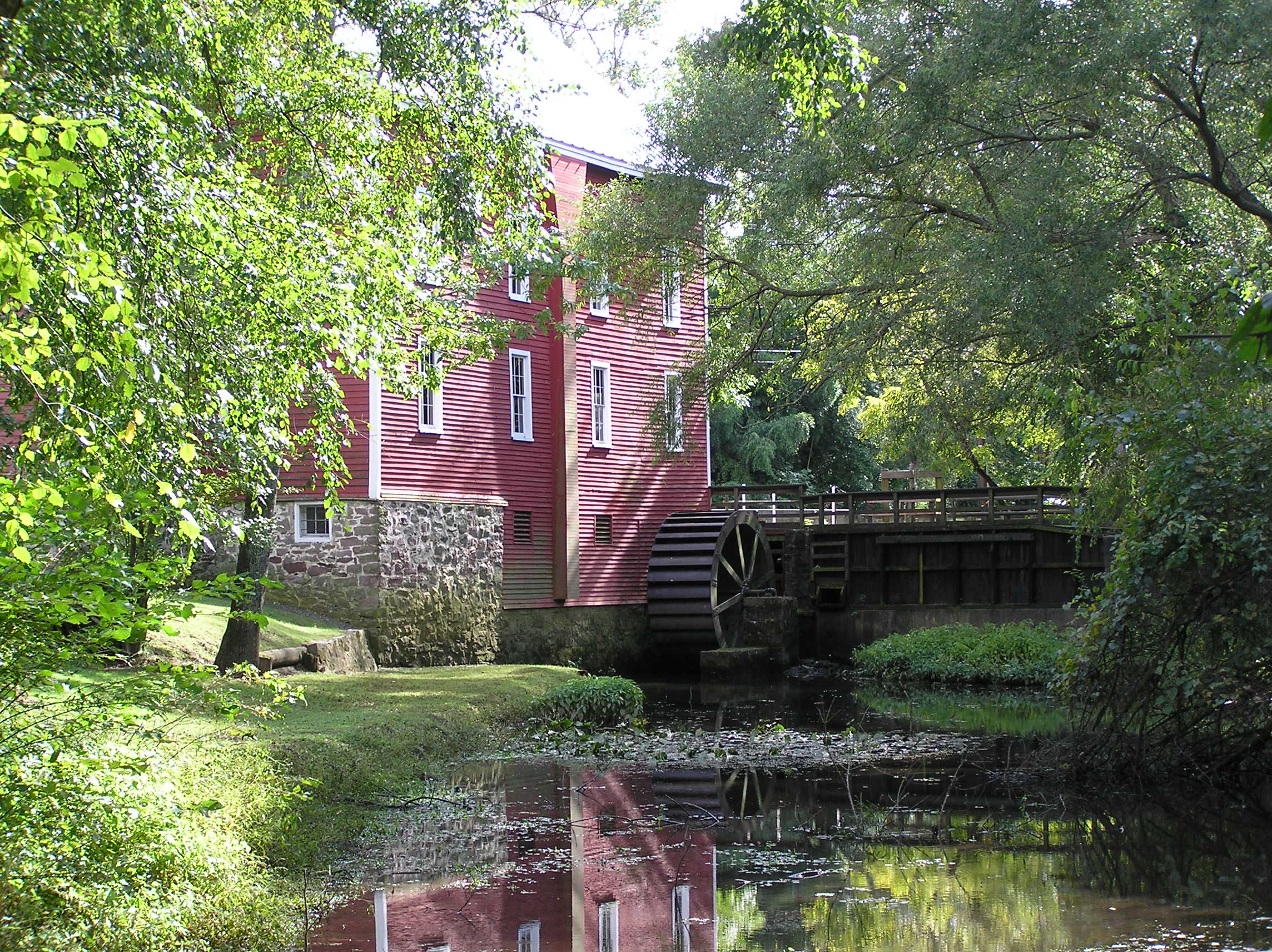

- Location within Burlington County, New Jersey Location within New Jersey Location within the United States
- Nearest city: Medford, New Jersey
- Coordinates: 39°55′0″N 74°48′22″W
- Area: 1.5 acres (0.61 ha)
- Built: 1778
- NRHP reference No.: 71000497
- Added to NRHP: August 12, 1971

Kirby's Mill is a historic grist mill in Medford, Burlington County, New Jersey, United States. Originally known as Haines Mill, it was built in 1778 by Isaac Haines and partners along the Southwest Branch of Rancocas Creek. It was the last commercial operating mill in New Jersey.

== History ==
=== 18th and 19th centuries ===
A sawmill was built along the creek, and an adjacent brick house, called the Miller's House, was built about 1785. The grist mill was enlarged to three stories about 1830. A blacksmith shop and barn were also built during this period.

William S. Kirby purchased the mill complex in 1877 and added a fourth floor to the grist mill. The original water wheel was replaced with water turbines, which provided more power and were submerged, permitting year-round operation.

The mill produced wheat, buckwheat and rye flour, cornmeal and chicken feed. The sawmill produced lumber for the mid-Atlantic region into the 20th century.

=== 20th century ===
Flour production stopped in the 1920s. The gristmill was converted to electrical operation in 1961. Livestock feed was produced until 1969.

Kirby's Mill was relatively unaffected by a disastrous storm that struck upstream from the site in Medford, Medford Lakes, and Shamong Township on July 14, 2004. While the mill, grounds, roadway and surrounding property were inundated under up to 12+ feet of water, the structure remained intact, with little to no noticeable and appreciable damage. Medford Township, Burlington County, New Jersey State, and Federal Engineers, and Historic/Preservation Architects performed detailed surveys, and inspections to certify the building as safe, and only receiving "minor, cosmetic, or relatively inconspicuous" damage.

Each year, the Medford Historical Society hosts its annual Quilt Show, as well as the annual Apple Festival. Highlighting local artisans, crafts-workers, period scenes, and historical memorabilia. Attendance has been growing over the years, with 2012 being approximately 20,000 attendees. Kirby's Mill Apple Festival is one of the most popular festivals in the tri-county area.

== Renovations ==
Recently, historic renovations to the Millers House have been started. These have been started to return the structure to its original, more historically correct design and appearance. Removal of 1930 as well as 1950 additions, the return to timber structural members, glazing, and decorative fixtures, as well as historic renovation of the interior are expected to be completed by 2009. Additionally, construction of a period style carriage house has been started on the Mill's grounds.

Kirby's Mill is currently owned by the Medford Historical Society. The mill has been entered in the National Register of Historic Places in the United States.

The society is working to restore the mill, which is part of a museum complex that includes a country store, milliner's shop, print shop, carpenter shop, working blacksmith shop and sawmill. The museum is open during special events and on Sunday afternoons in the summer.

== See also ==
- National Register of Historic Places listings in Burlington County, New Jersey
