= C. William Haines =

American politician

Member of the New Jersey Senate from the 8th district
- In office January 8, 1985 – December 18, 1996
- Preceded by: Jim Saxton
- Succeeded by: Martha W. Bark

Member of the New Jersey General Assembly from the 8th district
- In office January 12, 1982 – January 8, 1985 Serving with Harold L. Colburn, Jr.
- Preceded by: Jim Saxton; Clifford W. Snedeker
- Succeeded by: Robert C. Shinn Jr.

Personal details
- Born: November 2, 1928 Mount Holly, New Jersey, U.S.
- Died: December 18, 1996 (aged 68) Mount Laurel, New Jersey, U.S.
- Party: Republican

C. William Haines (November 2, 1928 – December 18, 1996) was an American Republican Party politician who served in the New Jersey General Assembly from the 8th Legislative District from 1982 to 1985 and in the New Jersey Senate from 1985 until his death in 1996.

He died of cancer on December 18, 1996, in Mount Laurel, New Jersey at age 68.
