= Medford, New Jersey =

Township in Burlington County, New Jersey, US

- Township
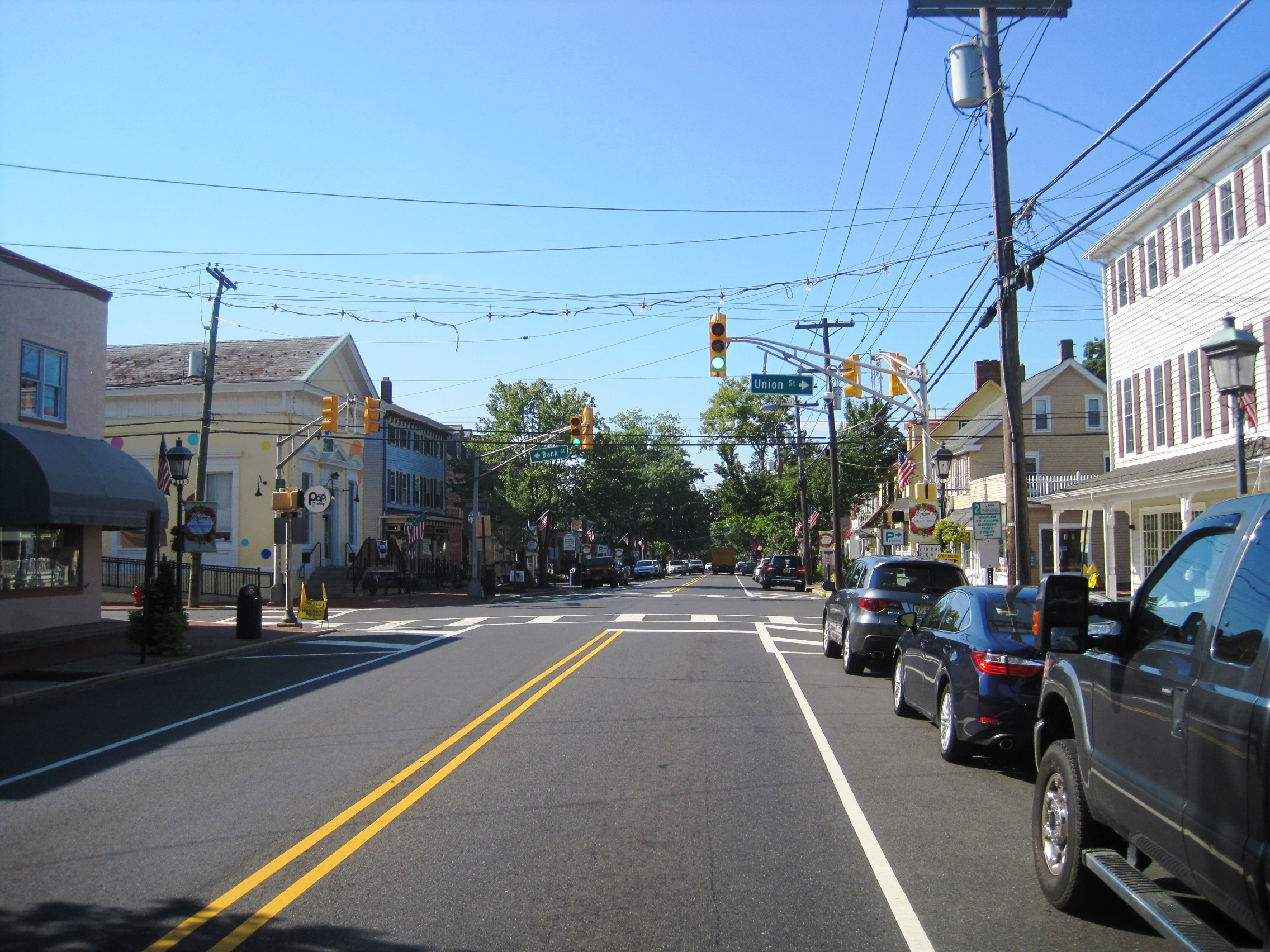
- Downtown Medford at CR 541 and Union Street, August 2016

- Seal

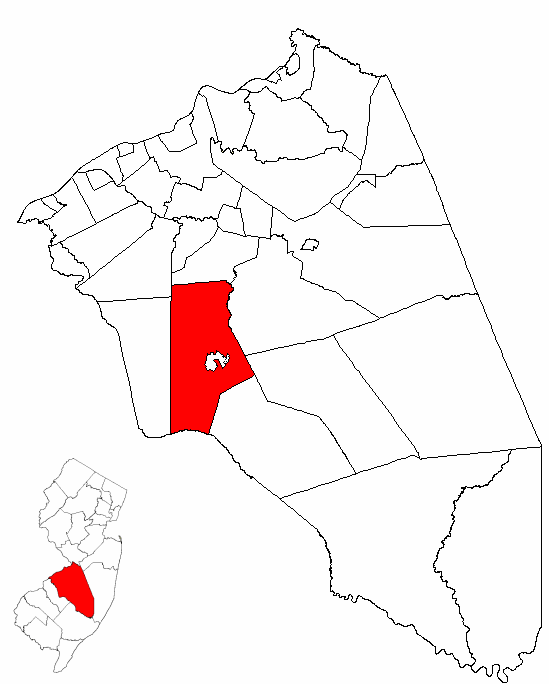
- Location of Medford in Burlington County highlighted in red (right). Inset map: Location of Burlington County in New Jersey highlighted in red (left).

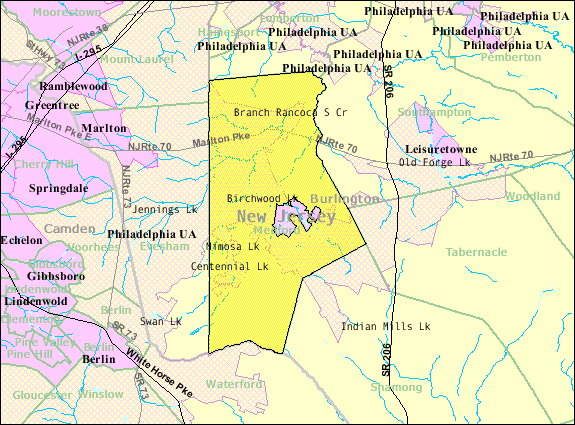
- Census Bureau map of Medford Township, New Jersey

- Location in Burlington County Location in New Jersey Location in the United States
- Coordinates: 39.864269°N 74.822471°W
- Country: United States
- State: New Jersey
- County: Burlington
- Incorporated: March 1, 1847
- Named for: Medford, Massachusetts, U.S.

Government
  - Type: Faulkner Act Council-Manager
  - Body: Township Council
  - Mayor: Erik Rebstock, (term ends December 31, 2025)
  - Manager: Daniel Hornickel
  - Municipal clerk: Tara Wicker

Area
  - Total: 39.81 sq mi (103.10 km^{2})
  - Land: 38.80 sq mi (100.49 km^{2})
  - Water: 1.01 sq mi (2.61 km^{2}) 2.53%
  - Rank: 56th of 565 in state 8th of 40 in county
- Elevation: 52 ft (16 m)

Population (2020)
  - Total: 24,497
  - Estimate (2023): 25,000
  - Rank: 107th of 565 in state 5th of 40 in county
  - Density: 631.4/sq mi (243.8/km^{2})
  - Rank: 425th of 565 in state 27th of 40 in county
- Time zone: UTC−05:00 (Eastern (EST))
  - Summer (DST): UTC−04:00 (Eastern (EDT))
- ZIP Code: 08055
- Area code: 609 exchanges: 654, 714, 953
- FIPS code: 3400545120
- GNIS feature ID: 0882083
- Website: www.medfordtownship.com

Medford is a township in Burlington County, in the U.S. state of New Jersey. As of the 2020 United States census, the township's population was 24,497, an increase of 1,464 (+6.4%) from the 2010 census count of 23,033, which in turn reflected an increase of 780 (+3.5%) from the 22,253 counted in the 2000 census. The township, and all of Burlington County, is a part of the Philadelphia metropolitan area.

Medford was incorporated as a township by an act of the New Jersey Legislature on March 1, 1847, from portions of Evesham Township, based on the results of a referendum held that day. Portions of the township were taken to form Shamong Township (February 19, 1852), Lumberton (March 14, 1860), and Medford Lakes (May 17, 1939). The township is part of the South Jersey region of the state.

== History ==
The area now known as Medford first saw European settlement when Samuel Coles purchased 900 acres (360 ha) of land in 1670. Shortly thereafter, families such as the Braddock, Prickett, Stratton, Branin, and Wilkins relocated to the area, many of whom have descendants residing in Medford today. Initially known as Upper Evesham, the area gradually developed from scattered homesteads into a small village. Several structures and roads built between the initial land sale and the American Revolutionary War, including Oliphant's Mill, Christopher's Mill, and the Shamong Trail (now Stokes Road), still exist today.

In 1820, the area officially adopted the name Medford of Upper Evesham with the establishment of a post office. This name was proposed by Mark Reeve, a developer who had recently visited Medford, Massachusetts. On March 1, 1847, Medford Township was formally separated from Evesham Township by an Act of the New Jersey Legislature. The first township meeting took place at the Cross Roads (now the intersection of County Route 541 and Church Road) on March 9, 1847, which remained the seat of township government for several years. Over time, the boundaries of Medford Township were altered, with portions taken to form Shamong Township in 1852 and Lumberton in 1860. The borders remained unchanged until 1939, when Medford Lakes was incorporated.

By 1825, a thriving glass-making industry had emerged in Medford, beginning with a furnace that produced window panes. By 1850, William Porter operated a glass factory on a triangular property bordered by South Main Street, Mill Street, and Trimble Street. The factory, which operated under names such as Medford Glass Works and Star Glass throughout the 1880s, employed approximately 250 workers at its peak. It fostered a "company town" atmosphere, providing housing for owners, managers, and workers, as well as a company store where workers could exchange scrip for food and necessities. Glass-making operations ceased around 1925, and the factory was demolished by the mid-1940s. Today, nearly 30 workers' homes are preserved on Trimble Street and Mill Street, along with the owners' and managers' residence at 126 South Main Street and the former company store at 132 South Main Street.

Dr. James Still (1812–1882), a self-taught African-American physician known as "the Black Doctor of the Pines," lived and practiced in Medford. Although his home was demolished in 1932, his office building was preserved when the State of New Jersey acquired it in 2006. It now serves as the Dr. James Still Historic Office Site and Education Center.

Medford's location along the Camden and Atlantic Railroad facilitated trade and contributed to rapid growth in the years following the American Civil War. By the 1920s, however, the railroad line had been dismantled, and the milling industry began to decline. Despite these changes, Medford continued to grow, largely due to its proximity to Philadelphia and Camden County, attracting families seeking a more rural lifestyle away from urban areas.

== Geography ==
According to the U.S. Census Bureau, the township had a total area of 39.81 square miles (103.10 km^{2}), including 38.80 square miles (100.49 km^{2}) of land and 1.01 square miles (2.61 km^{2}) of water (2.53%). Unincorporated communities, localities, and place names located partially or completely within the township include Birchwood Lakes, Braddocks Mill, Chairville, Christopher Mills, Crossroads, Fairview, Kirbys Mill, Medford Lakes in the Pines, Melrose, Oak Knoll, Oakanickon, Oliphants Mills, Pipers Corners, Reeves, Taunton, Taunton Lake, and Wilkins.

The township is one of 56 South Jersey municipalities that are included within the Pinelands National Reserve, a protected natural area of unique ecology covering 1,100,000 acres (450,000 ha), that has been classified as a United States Biosphere Reserve and established by Congress in 1978 as the nation's first National Reserve. Part of the township is included in the state-designated Pinelands Area, which includes portions of Burlington County, along with areas in Atlantic, Camden, Cape May, Cumberland, Gloucester, and Ocean counties.

Medford Lakes is an independent municipality encircled within the boundaries of Medford, making it half one of 21 pairs of "doughnut towns" in the state, where one municipality entirely surrounds another. The township borders Evesham Township (which includes Marlton), Lumberton, Mount Laurel, Shamong Township, Southampton, Tabernacle in Burlington County; and Waterford Township in Camden County.

The climate of Medford is classified as humid continental, with cold winters, hot summers, and year-round humidity. Annual precipitation for the area is 41 inches (1,000 mm), and annual snowfall is 23 inches (580 mm).

== Demographics ==
Historical population
Census	Pop.	Note	%±
1850	3,022		—
1860	2,136	*	−29.3%
1870	2,189		2.5%
1880	1,980		−9.5%
1890	1,864		−5.9%
1900	1,969		5.6%
1910	1,903		−3.4%
1920	1,891		−0.6%
1930	2,021		6.9%
1940	2,237	*	10.7%
1950	2,836		26.8%
1960	4,844		70.8%
1970	8,292		71.2%
1980	17,622		112.5%
1990	20,526		16.5%
2000	22,253		8.4%
2010	23,033		3.5%
2020	24,497		6.4%
2023 (est.)	25,000		2.1%
Population sources: 1850–2000; 1850–1920 1850–1870; 1850 1870 1880–1890; 1890–1910 1910–1930; 1940–2000 2000; 2010 2020 * = Lost territory in previous decade.

=== 2020 census ===
Medford township, New Jersey – Racial and ethnic composition Note: the US Census treats Hispanic/Latino as an ethnic category. This table excludes Latinos from the racial categories and assigns them to a separate category. Hispanics/Latinos may be of any race.
Race / Ethnicity (NH = Non-Hispanic)	Pop 2000	Pop 2010	Pop 2020	% 2000	% 2010	% 2020
White alone (NH)	21,353	21,330	21,506	95.96%	92.61%	87.79%
Black or African American alone (NH)	165	338	429	0.74%	1.47%	1.75%
Native American or Alaska Native alone (NH)	25	15	14	0.11%	0.07%	0.06%
Asian alone (NH)	325	460	582	1.46%	2.00%	2.38%
Pacific Islander alone (NH)	4	4	2	0.02%	0.02%	0.01%
Other Race alone (NH)	10	16	69	0.04%	0.07%	0.28%
Mixed race or Multiracial (NH)	119	270	788	0.53%	1.17%	3.22%
Hispanic or Latino (any race)	252	600	1,107	1.13%	2.60%	4.52%
Total	22,253	23,033	24,497	100.00%	100.00%	100.00%

=== 2010 census ===
The 2010 United States census counted 23,033 people, 8,277 households, and 6,456 families in the township. The population density was 591.8 per square mile (228.5/km^{2}). There were 8,652 housing units at an average density of 222.3 per square mile (85.8/km^{2}). The racial makeup was 94.33% (21,726) White, 1.53% (353) Black or African American, 0.16% (36) Native American, 2.03% (467) Asian, 0.03% (6) Pacific Islander, 0.56% (130) from other races, and 1.37% (315) from two or more races. Hispanic or Latino of any race were 2.60% (600) of the population.

Of the 8,277 households, 36.4% had children under the age of 18; 67.3% were married couples living together; 7.9% had a female householder with no husband present and 22.0% were non-families. Of all households, 18.1% were made up of individuals and 7.9% had someone living alone who was 65 years of age or older. The average household size was 2.76 and the average family size was 3.15.

26.1% of the population were under the age of 18, 6.0% from 18 to 24, 20.6% from 25 to 44, 33.3% from 45 to 64, and 13.9% who were 65 years of age or older. The median age was 43.6 years. For every 100 females, the population had 94.4 males. For every 100 females ages 18 and older there were 92.3 males.

The Census Bureau's 2006–2010 American Community Survey showed that (in 2010 inflation-adjusted dollars) median household income was $107,883 (with a margin of error of +/− $5,728) and the median family income was $122,986 (+/− $5,037). Males had a median income of $82,169 (+/− $6,188) versus $58,324 (+/− $5,381) for females. The per capita income for the borough was $45,926 (+/− $2,571). About 0.8% of families and 1.9% of the population were below the poverty line, including 2.1% of those under age 18 and 1.5% of those age 65 or over.

=== 2000 census ===
As of the 2000 U.S. census, there were 22,253 people, 7,946 households, and 6,285 families residing in the township. The population density was 566.0 inhabitants per square mile (218.5/km^{2}). There were 8,147 housing units at an average density of 207.2 per square mile (80.0/km^{2}). The racial makeup of the township was 96.74% White, 0.76% African American, 0.12% Native American, 1.47% Asian, 0.04% Pacific Islander, 0.28% from other races, and 0.59% from two or more races. Hispanic or Latino of any race were 1.13% of the population.

There were 7,946 households, out of which 38.3% had children under the age of 18 living with them, 70.8% were married couples living together, 6.4% had a female householder with no husband present, and 20.9% were non-families. 17.4% of all households were made up of individuals, and 7.6% had someone living alone who was 65 years of age or older. The average household size was 2.77 and the average family size was 3.16.

In the township, the age distribution of the population shows 26.8% under the age of 18, 5.4% from 18 to 24, 26.7% from 25 to 44, 30.4% from 45 to 64, and 10.7% who were 65 years of age or older. The median age was 40 years. For every 100 females, there were 93.9 males. For every 100 females age 18 and over, there were 90.1 males.

The median income for a household in the township was $83,059, and the median income for a family was $97,135. Males had a median income of $69,786 versus $37,012 for females. The per capita income for the township was $38,641. About 0.9% of families and 1.9% of the population were below the poverty line, including 2.1% of those under age 18 and 2.2% of those age 65 or over.

== Arts and culture ==
Brothers Charlie and Richie Ingui founded and sing with the R&B group Soul Survivors.

== Parks and recreation ==
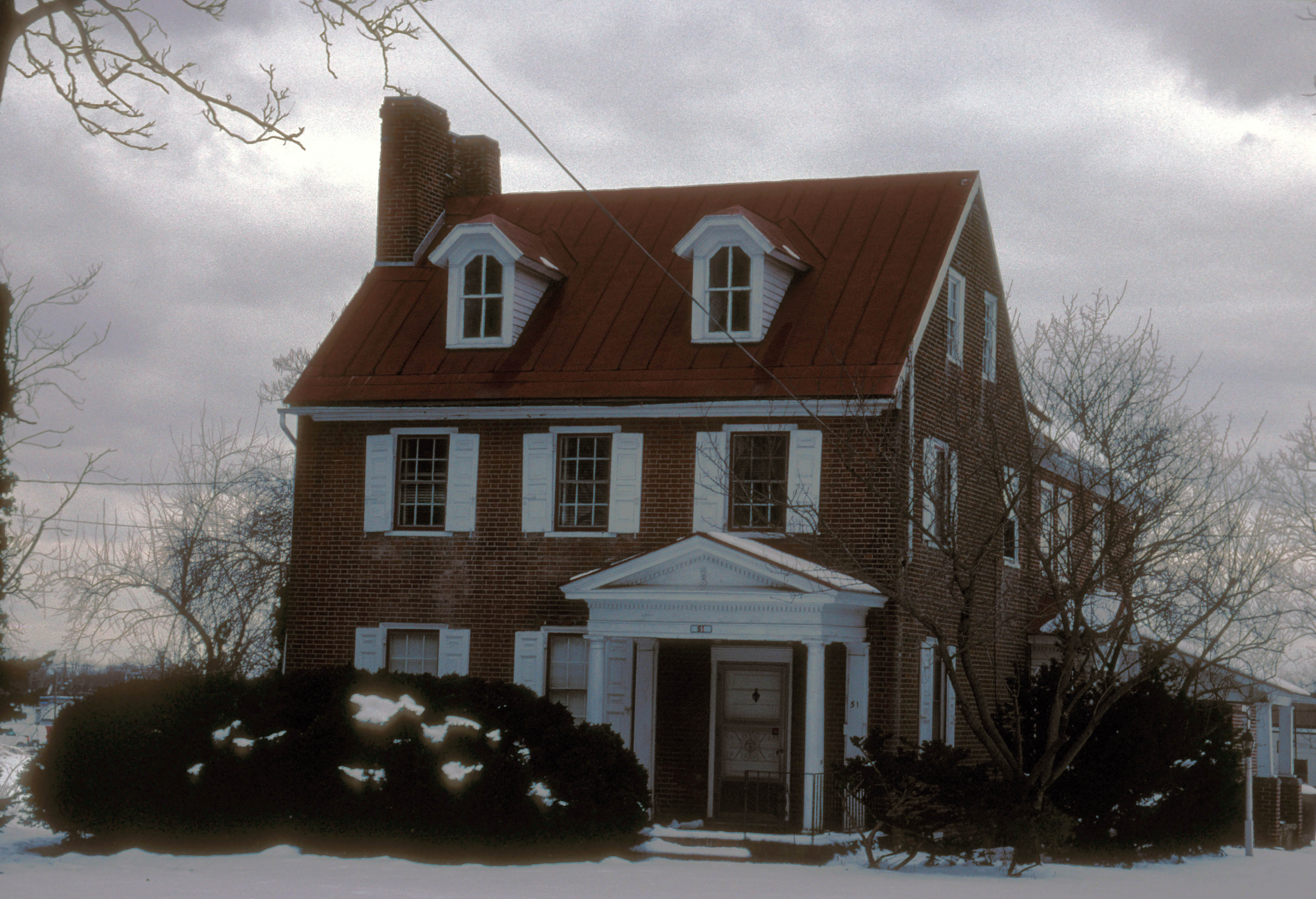
Jonathan Haines House

- Woodford Cedar Run Wildlife Refuge is a 170-acre (69 ha) nature preserve and wildlife rehabilitation center located on the southern border of Medford and is open to the public.
- Freedom Park is a public park with extensive playground equipment, basketball and volleyball courts, bike paths, large pavilions, and large multipurpose fields, including a dog run.
- Kirby's Mill is a grist mill (flour mill) that has been added to the National Register of Historic Places.
- Medford Canoe Trail is a recently cleared canoe trail connecting Medford Park to Kirby's Mill.
- Historic Medford Village offers shopping, historic homes and an old-fashioned atmosphere, serving as the site of Medford's traditional Dickens Festival.
- JCC Camps at Medford is the largest Jewish day camp in North America, operating since 1942. Part of the Jewish Federation of Southern New Jersey, the camp is accredited by the American Camp Association. Catering to children aged three and up from Camden, Burlington, and Gloucester counties, it offers a leader-in-training program for teenagers 14 or older. Located amidst the lakes of Medford in the New Jersey Pine Barrens, the camp includes a 4-acre (16,000 m^{2}) lake for boating and fishing, four pools, playgrounds, athletic fields, a petting zoo, and a ropes course, and serves kosher lunch.
- Camp Ockanickon (established in 1906), Matollionequay (established in 1937), and Stockwell (established in 1990) are three neighboring YMCA summer camps and conference centers that cover over 800 acres (320 ha) in the Pine Barrens.

== Government ==
=== Local government ===
Medford Township operates within the Faulkner Act (formally known as the Optional Municipal Charter Law) under the Council-Manager (Plan E) form of municipal government, implemented based on the recommendations of a Charter Study Commission as of January 1, 1980. The township is one of 42 municipalities (of the 564) statewide that use this form of government. The governing body is comprised of the five-member Council, whose members are elected at-large in partisan elections to staggered four-year terms of office as part of the November general election, with either two or three seats up for election in odd-numbered years. At a reorganization meeting held each January, the Council selects a Mayor and a Deputy Mayor from among its members.

Mayor Chris Myers resigned from the Township Council in December 2011, after it was disclosed that he had hired a male escort. He was replaced in January 2012 by Chuck Watson.

The township council selected Brad Denn in October 2014 from three candidates nominated by the Republican municipal committee to fill the vacant seat of James "Randy" Pace, who resigned from office after he moved out of state. Denn was elected to serve the remaining two years of office in November 2015.

In March 2019, Lauren Kochan was selected from three candidates nominated by the Republican municipal committee to fill the unexpired term of office ending in December 2019 that had been vacated the previous month by Chris Buoni, who announced that he was moving out of the township.

As of 2023, members of the Medford Township Council are Mayor Charles "Chuck" J. Watson (R, term on council ends December 31, 2025; term as mayor ends 2023), Deputy Mayor Lauren Kochan (R, term on council and as deputy mayor ends 2023), Frank P. Czekay (R, 2023), Erik J. Rebstock (R, 2025) and Donna Symons (R, 2025).

=== Federal, state, and county representation ===
Medford Township is located in the 3rd Congressional District and is part of New Jersey's 8th state legislative district.

For the 119th United States Congress, New Jersey's 3rd congressional district is currently represented Herb Conaway (D, Delran Township). New Jersey is represented in the United States Senate by Democrats Cory Booker (Newark, term ends 2027) and Andy Kim (Moorestown, term ends 2031).

For the 2026–2027 session, the 8th legislative district of the New Jersey Legislature is represented in the New Jersey Senate by Latham Tiver (R, Southampton Township) and in the General Assembly by Anthony Angelozzi (D, Hammonton) and Andrea Katz (D, Chesterfield Township).

Burlington County is governed by a Board of County Commissioners comprised of five members who are chosen at-large in partisan elections to serve three-year terms of office on a staggered basis, with either one or two seats coming up for election each year; at an annual reorganization meeting, the board selects a director and deputy director from among its members to serve a one-year term. As of 2026, Burlington County's Commissioners are: Director Felicia Hopson (D, Willingboro Township, term as commissioner ends December 31, 2027; term as director ends 2026), Deputy Director Allison Eckel (D, Medford, term as commissioner ends 2028; term as deputy director ends 2026), Randy Brolo (D, Lumberton, 2026; elected to an unexpired term), Tyler Burrell (D, Delran Township, 2027) and Tom Pullion (D, Edgewater Park, 2026).

Burlington County's constitutional officers are Clerk Joanne Schwartz (D, Southampton Township, 2028), Sheriff James H. Kostoplis (D, Bordentown, 2028) and Surrogate Brian J. Carlin (D, Burlington Township, 2026).

=== Politics ===
United States presidential election results for Medford Township 2024 2020 2016 2012 2008 2004
Year	Republican		Democratic		Third party(ies)	
Year	No.	%	No.	%	No.	%
2024	7,101	48.77%	7,301	50.14%	158	1.09%
2020	8,056	48.88%	8,170	49.57%	255	1.55%
2016	6,891	50.20%	6,301	45.91%	534	3.89%
2012	7,499	56.06%	5,747	42.97%	130	0.97%
2008	7,049	52.61%	6,214	46.38%	135	1.01%
2004	7,615	57.50%	5,551	41.91%	78	0.59%

As of March 2011, there were a total of 16,632 registered voters in Medford Township, of which 3,893 (23.4% vs. 33.3% countywide) were registered as Democrats, 5,406 (32.5% vs. 23.9%) were registered as Republicans and 7,320 (44.0% vs. 42.8%) were registered as Unaffiliated. There were 13 voters registered as Libertarians or Greens. Among the township's 2010 Census population, 72.2% (vs. 61.7% in Burlington County) were registered to vote, including 97.7% of those ages 18 and over (vs. 80.3% countywide).

In the 2012 presidential election, Republican Mitt Romney received 7,499 votes here (55.8% vs. 40.2% countywide), ahead of Democrat Barack Obama with 5,747 votes (42.7% vs. 58.1%) and other candidates with 130 votes (1.0% vs. 1.0%), among the 13,451 ballots cast by the township's 17,574 registered voters, for a turnout of 76.5% (vs. 74.5% in Burlington County). In the 2008 presidential election, Republican John McCain received 7,049 votes here (52.3% vs. 39.9% countywide), ahead of Democrat Barack Obama with 6,214 votes (46.1% vs. 58.4%) and other candidates with 135 votes (1.0% vs. 1.0%), among the 13,466 ballots cast by the township's 16,535 registered voters, for a turnout of 81.4% (vs. 80.0% in Burlington County). In the 2004 presidential election, Republican George W. Bush received 7,615 votes here (57.4% vs. 46.0% countywide), ahead of Democrat John Kerry with 5,551 votes (41.8% vs. 52.9%) and other candidates with 78 votes (0.6% vs. 0.8%), among the 13,266 ballots cast by the township's 16,086 registered voters, for a turnout of 82.5% (vs. 78.8% in the whole county).

Gubernatorial election results for Medford
Year	Republican		Democratic		Third party(ies)	
Year	No.	%	No.	%	No.	%
2025	6,198	48.73%	6,468	50.86%	52	0.41%
2021	6,073	56.10%	4,696	43.38%	57	0.53%
2017	4,100	51.65%	3,708	46.71%	130	1.64%
2013	5,628	72.14%	2,067	26.49%	107	1.37%
2009	5,371	60.49%	2,987	33.64%	521	5.87%
2005	4,800	58.59%	3,128	38.18%	264	3.22%

In the 2013 gubernatorial election, Republican Chris Christie received 5,628 votes here (71.0% vs. 61.4% countywide), ahead of Democrat Barbara Buono with 2,067 votes (26.1% vs. 35.8%) and other candidates with 107 votes (1.3% vs. 1.2%), among the 7,929 ballots cast by the township's 17,464 registered voters, yielding a 45.4% turnout (vs. 44.5% in the county). In the 2009 gubernatorial election, Republican Chris Christie received 5,371 votes here (60.1% vs. 47.7% countywide), ahead of Democrat Jon Corzine with 2,987 votes (33.4% vs. 44.5%), Independent Chris Daggett with 438 votes (4.9% vs. 4.8%) and other candidates with 83 votes (0.9% vs. 1.2%), among the 8,931 ballots cast by the township's 16,733 registered voters, yielding a 53.4% turnout (vs. 44.9% in the county).

United States Senate election results for Medford1
Year	Republican		Democratic		Third party(ies)	
Year	No.	%	No.	%	No.	%
2024	6,580	46.26%	7,480	52.59%	164	1.15%
2018	6,496	53.72%	5,067	41.90%	529	4.37%
2012	7,145	55.75%	5,578	43.53%	92	0.72%
2006	4,781	57.80%	3,383	40.90%	107	1.29%

United States Senate election results for Medford2
Year	Republican		Democratic		Third party(ies)	
Year	No.	%	No.	%	No.	%
2020	8,296	51.28%	7,689	47.53%	192	1.19%
2014	4,110	57.85%	2,897	40.78%	97	1.37%
2013	2,734	56.11%	2,100	43.09%	39	0.80%
2008	7,213	57.56%	5,173	41.28%	145	1.16%

== Education ==
Medford Township Public Schools is a public school district that serves students in pre-kindergarten through eighth grade. The district has five elementary schools serving students in kindergarten through fifth grade, a single school serving sixth graders and a school serving seventh and eighth graders. As of the 2020–21 school year, the district, comprised of seven schools, had an enrollment of 2,517 students and 225.1 classroom teachers (on an FTE basis), for a student–teacher ratio of 11.2:1. Schools in the district (with 2020–21 enrollment data from the National Center for Education Statistics) are Milton H. Allen School with 399 students in grades K–5, Chairville Elementary School with 360 students in grades K–5, Cranberry Pines School with 365 students in grades K–5, Kirby's Mill Elementary School with 300 students in grades Pre-K–5, Taunton Forge School with 251 students in grades K–5, Maurice and Everett Haines Sixth Grade Center with 232 students in 6th grade, and Medford Memorial Middle School with 600 students in grades 7–8.

Public school students in ninth through twelfth grades attend Shawnee High School, located in Medford, which serves students in ninth through twelfth grade from both Medford Lakes and Medford. The school is part of the Lenape Regional High School District, which also serves students from Evesham Township, Mount Laurel, Shamong Township, Southampton Township, Tabernacle Township and Woodland Township. As of the 2020–21 school year, the high school had an enrollment of 1,576 students and 122.0 classroom teachers (on an FTE basis), for a student–teacher ratio of 12.9:1. Seats on the high school district's 11-member board of education are allocated based on the population of the constituent municipalities, with two seats assigned to Medford.

Burlington County Institute of Technology is a countywide public vocational-technical school district serving students throughout Burlington County, with campuses in Medford and Westampton. As of the 2018–19 school year, the high school had an enrollment of 837 students and 62.5 classroom teachers (on an FTE basis), for a student–teacher ratio of 13.4:1.

Established in 1954, St. Mary of the Lakes School is a Catholic school that serves students in Pre-K through eighth grade, operated under the auspices of the Roman Catholic Diocese of Trenton.

== Transportation ==
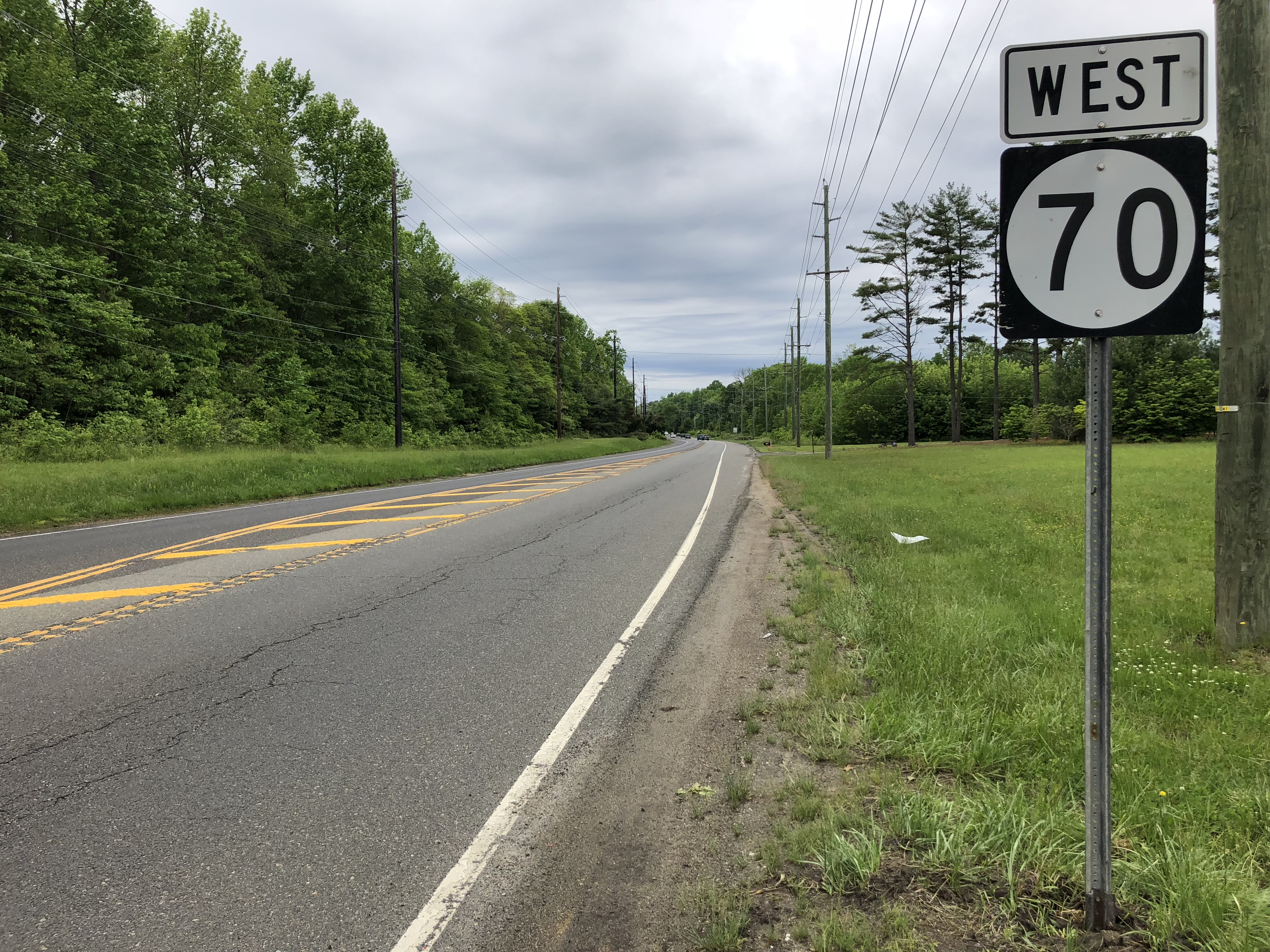
Route 70 in Medford

=== Roads and highways ===
As of May 2010, the township had a total of 179.25 miles (288.47 km) of roadways, of which 153.27 miles (246.66 km) were maintained by the municipality, 21.85 miles (35.16 km) by Burlington County and 4.13 miles (6.65 km) by the New Jersey Department of Transportation.

Major roads in Medford include Route 70, CR 532, CR 541, and CR 544.

=== Public transportation ===
NJ Transit used to provide bus service to and from Philadelphia on the 406 bus route which ended in Evesham Township but has been discontinued. Greyhound Lines provides nationwide service from nearby Mount Laurel.

The Flying W Airport, a public-use airport, is located in Medford near the border with Lumberton.

== Notable people ==
People who were born in, residents of, or otherwise closely associated with Medford include:

- Brenden Aaronson (born 2000), professional soccer midfielder for Leeds United of the English Premier League and the United States men's national soccer team
- Paxten Aaronson (born 2003), professional soccer player, United States international, and Olympian
- David Akers (born 1974), former placekicker for the Philadelphia Eagles
- Martha W. Bark (1928–2015), former member of the New Jersey Senate and General Assembly, who served as Mayor of Medford in 1981 and 1985
- Brandon Brooks (born 1989), formerly the right guard for Philadelphia Eagles
- Angelo Cataldi (born 1951) is a sports radio personality for 94.1 WIP in Philadelphia
- Brian Clarhaut (born 1986), soccer coach
- Charles Dwight Curtiss (1887–1983), Administrator of the Federal Highway Administration from 1955 to 1957
- Jarret DeHart (born 1994), assistant hitting coach for the Seattle Mariners
- Harry Ekman (1923–1999), graphic artist best known for his pin-up and advertising work, specifically with Gil Elvgren
- Calista Flockhart (born 1964), actress best known for her title role as Ally McBeal
- Jamie Franks (born 1986), professional soccer player
- Ron Gassert (born 1940), former NFL defensive tackle who played for two seasons with the Green Bay Packers
- Michael Hartmann (born 1994), professional soccer player who plays as a goalkeeper for FC Haka in the Veikkausliiga
- Ryan Heins (born 1985), retired soccer defender and midfielder
- James Hunter III (1916–1989), judge of the United States Court of Appeals for the Third Circuit
- Kelli James (born 1970), former field hockey striker who earned a total number of 144 caps for the United States women's national field hockey team
- Ron Jaworski (born 1951), former NFL quarterback and current analyst on ESPN
- Stephen King (born 1986), soccer player for the D.C. United
- Jason Knapp, sportscaster for the CBS Sports Network
- C. Harry Knowles (1928–2020), physicist, entrepreneur, philanthropist, and a prolific inventor who held some 400 patents
- Carl Lewis (born 1961), athlete and winner of nine Olympic gold medals
- Carli Lloyd (born 1982), former professional soccer player
- Ryan Maki (born 1985), hockey right winger
- Robert J. Meyer (1935–1984), politician who served in the New Jersey General Assembly from the 8th Legislative District from 1982 until his death in 1984
- Kenneth G. Miller (born 1956), geologist at Rutgers University who has written and lectured on global warming and sea level change
- Chauncey Morehouse (1902–1980), jazz drummer
- Chris Myers (born 1965), former mayor of Meford who resigned from the Township Council in December 2011
- Ted Nash (1932–2021), competition rower and Olympic champion, rowing coach, and sports administrator
- Mike Posma (born 1967), former professional ice hockey player and head coach
- Rebecca Quick (born 1972), television journalist/newscaster and co-anchorwoman of CNBC's financial news show Squawk Box
- Scott Rudder (born 1969), former mayor of Medford who represented the 8th Legislative District in the New Jersey General Assembly
- Dee Dee Sharp (born 1945), R & B singer whose hits included Billboard #2 "Mashed Potato Time"
- Tom Simcox (born 1937), film and television actor.
- Don Snow (born 1957), musician best known for his work with the band Squeeze
- Liz Tchou (born 1966), former field hockey defender who was a member of the US women's team that finished fifth at the 1996 Summer Olympics
- Helen Thorpe (born 1963), author and freelance journalist who was the First Lady of Colorado
- Drew Van Acker (born 1986), actor who has appeared in the Pretty Little Liars TV series
- Albert W. Van Duzer (1917–1999), bishop of the Episcopal Diocese of New Jersey, serving from 1973 to 1982
- Mitch Williams (born 1964), former relief pitcher who earned 192 saves in his 11 MLB seasons
