= Medford Township Public Schools =

School district in Burlington County, New Jersey, US

Address
- 137 Hartford Road Medford, Burlington County, New Jersey, 08055; United States
- Coordinates: 39.905299°N 74.847498°W

District information
- Grades: Pre-K to 8
- Superintendent: Keira Scussa
- Business administrator: Jonathan Yates
- Schools: 7

Students and staff
- Enrollment: 2,517 (as of 2020–21)
- Faculty: 225.1 FTEs
- Student–teacher ratio: 11.2:1

Other information
- District Factor Group: I
- Website: www.medford.k12.nj.us
Ind.	Per pupil	District spending	Rank (*)	K-8 average	%± vs. average
1A	Total Spending	$20,616	45	$20,745	−0.6%
1	Budgetary Cost	14,897	35	15,258	−2.4%
2	Classroom Instruction	9,036	34	8,999	0.4%
6	Support Services	2,252	33	2,414	−6.7%
8	Administrative Cost	1,751	50	1,655	5.8%
10	Operations & Maintenance	1,658	47	1,658	0.0%
13	Extracurricular Activities	41	7	117	−65.0%
16	Median Teacher Salary	72,915	70	63,770
Data from NJDoE 2016-17 Taxpayers' Guide to Education Spending. *Of K-8 districts with more than 750 students. Lowest spending=1; Highest=76

The Medford Township Public Schools is a community public school district serving students in pre-kindergarten through eighth grade from Medford, in Burlington County, in the U.S. state of New Jersey. The district has five elementary schools serving students in kindergarten through fifth grade, a single school serving sixth graders and a school serving seventh and eighth graders.

As of the 2020–21 school year, the district, comprised of seven schools, had an enrollment of 2,517 students and 225.1 classroom teachers (on an FTE basis), for a student–teacher ratio of 11.2:1.

The district is classified by the New Jersey Department of Education as being in District Factor Group "I", the second-highest of eight groupings. District Factor Groups organize districts statewide to allow comparison by common socioeconomic characteristics of the local districts. From lowest socioeconomic status to highest, the categories are A, B, CD, DE, FG, GH, I and J.

Public school students in ninth through twelfth grades attend Shawnee High School, located in Medford Township, which serves students in ninth through twelfth grade from both Medford Lakes and Medford Township. The school is part of the Lenape Regional High School District, which also serves students from Evesham Township, Mount Laurel Township, Shamong Township, Southampton Township, Tabernacle Township and Woodland Township. As of the 2020–21 school year, the high school had an enrollment of 1,576 students and 122.0 classroom teachers (on an FTE basis), for a student–teacher ratio of 12.9:1.

== History ==
The district was the subject of the C. H. v. Oliva, a religious freedom case in which mother Carol Hood sued Grace Oliva, her son Zachary's first grade teacher, and related administrators in the Medford Township Public Schools for a 1996 incident in which her son was not allowed to read a section of the Bible in his kindergarten class. After courts rejected the family's claim, calling the students a "captive audience", the Supreme Court of the United States declined to hear the case in 2001.

== Schools ==
Schools in the district (with 2020–21 enrollment data from the National Center for Education Statistics) are:

Elementary schools

- Milton H. Allen School with 399 students in grades K-5
  - Christopher Clarke, principal
- Chairville Elementary School with 360 students in grades K-5
  - Ryan Winkelspecht, principal
- Cranberry Pines School with 365 students in grades K-5
  - Jennifer Petagno, principal
- Kirby's Mill Elementary School with 300 students in grades PreK-5
  - Helen Saul, principal
- Taunton Forge School with 251 students in grades K-5
  - Lucas Coesfeld, principal

Middle schools (6-8)

- Maurice and Everett Haines Sixth Grade Center with 232 students in 6th grade
  - Brooke Farrow, principal
- Medford Memorial Middle School with 600 students in grades 7-8
  - Shawn Ryan, principal

== Administration ==
Core members of the district's administration are:

- Keira Scussa, superintendent
- Evon DiGangi, business administrator and board secretary
- Mark E. Damon, Director of Personnel

== Board of education ==
The district's board of education, comprised of nine members, sets policy and oversees the fiscal and educational operation of the district through its administration. As a Type II school district, the board's trustees are elected directly by voters to serve three-year terms of office on a staggered basis, with three seats up for election each year held (since 2012) as part of the November general election. The board appoints a superintendent to oversee the district's day-to-day operations and a business administrator to supervise the business functions of the district.
