= Phil Haines =

American politician

Judge of the New Jersey Superior Court for the 3rd Vicinage
- Incumbent
- Assumed office October 18, 2010

Member of the New Jersey Senate from the 8th district
- In office January 8, 2008 – October 18, 2010
- Preceded by: Martha W. Bark
- Succeeded by: Dawn Marie Addiego

Burlington County Clerk
- In office 2000–2008
- Succeeded by: Timothy Tyler

Member of the Burlington County Board of Chosen Freeholders
- In office 1997–1999

Personal details
- Born: Philip E. Haines; December 31, 1950 (age 75)
- Party: Republican
- Education: La Salle University (B.A.); Rutgers School of Law–Newark (J.D.)

Military service
- Allegiance: United States
- Branch/service: United States Army
- Years of service: 1970-1976
- Rank: E-4

Philip E. Haines (born December 31, 1950) is an American Republican politician who served in the New Jersey Senate from January 8, 2008, to October 18, 2010, where he represented the 8th legislative district. He resigned his Senate seat to serve on the New Jersey Superior Court in Burlington County.

== Biography ==
Haines received a B.A. from La Salle University majoring in History and Political Science, and was awarded a J.D. from Rutgers School of Law–Newark. He served in the United States Army from 1970 to 1976, as an E-4.

Haines served on the Burlington County Board of Chosen Freeholders from 1997 to 1999 and served as the Burlington County Clerk from 2000 until his election to the State Senate. He served on the New Jersey Council on Armed Forces and Veterans Affairs from 1999 to 2004.

In the Senate, Haines served on the Budget and Appropriations Committee and the Community and Urban Affairs Committee.

Haines was expected to receive a nomination to a Superior Court judgeship after the 2009 general elections were completed. On October 18, 2010, he was confirmed for the Justice of Burlington County Superior Court.

Haines previously worked as an attorney with the firm of Caplan Haines. He is a resident of the Juliustown section of Springfield Township, Burlington County, New Jersey.

== Electoral history ==
=== Burlington County Clerk ===
Burlington County General Election, 2004
Party	Candidate	Votes	%
Republican	Phil Haines (incumbent)	104,976	55.03
Democratic	Kristin R. Walker	84,501	44.31
Total votes		189,477	99.34
Republican hold			
