= Charles Richman =

Charles Richman may refer to:

- Charles Richman (commissioner), acting commissioner of the New Jersey Department of Community Affairs
- Charles Richman (actor) (1865–1940), American stage and film actor
