= Mount Laurel, New Jersey =

Township in Burlington County, New Jersey, US

- Township
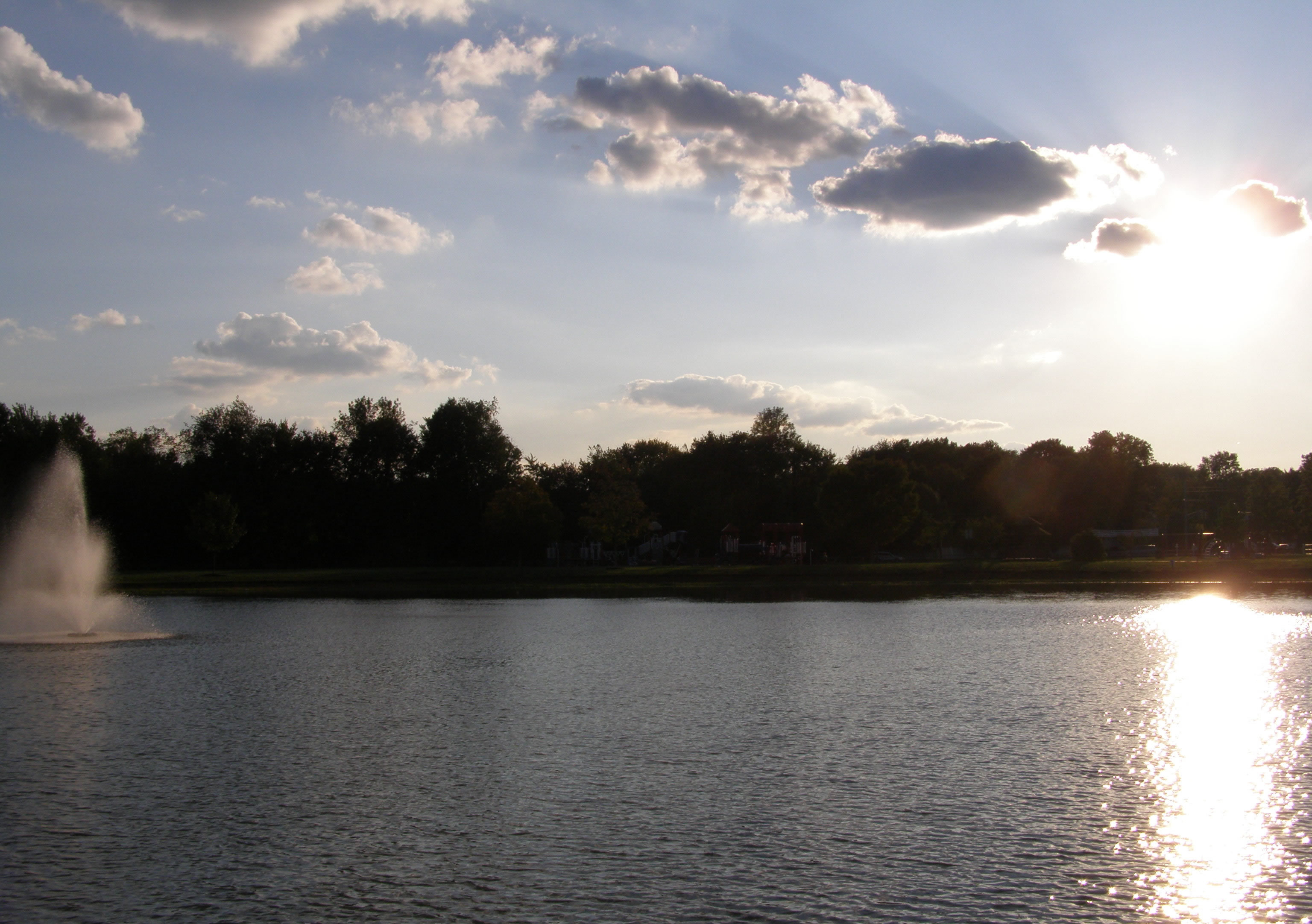
- Laurel Acres Park in Mount Laurel

- Seal

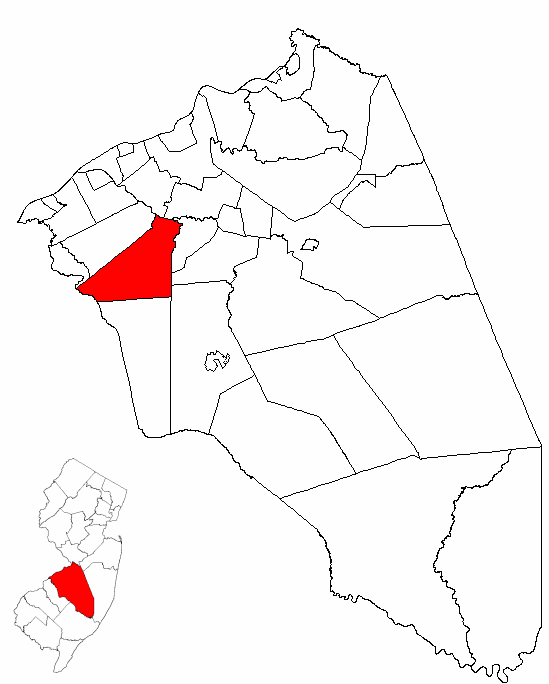
- Location of Burlington County in New Jersey (left) and of Mount Laurel in Burlington County (right)

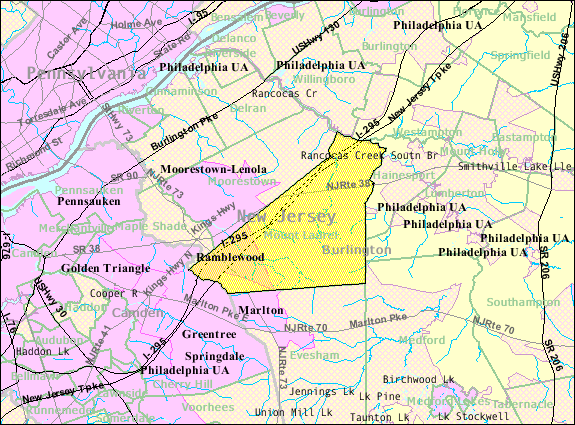
- Census Bureau map of Mount Laurel, New Jersey

- Location of Mount Laurel in Burlington County Location in New Jersey Location in the United States
- Coordinates: 39.948992°N 74.900247°W
- Country: United States
- State: New Jersey
- County: Burlington
- Incorporated: March 7, 1872

Government
  - Type: Faulkner Act (council–manager)
  - Body: Township Council
  - Mayor: Nikitas Moustakas (D)
  - Deputy Mayor: Stephen Steglik
  - Township Council: Silvia Catalan-Culnan; Kareem Pritchett; Fozia Janjua
  - Township Manager/Clerk: Meredith Riculfy

Area
  - Total: 21.99 sq mi (56.95 km^{2})
  - Land: 21.72 sq mi (56.26 km^{2})
  - Water: 0.27 sq mi (0.69 km^{2}) 1.21%
  - Rank: 124th of 565 in state 12th of 40 in county
- Elevation: 36 ft (11 m)

Population (2020)
  - Total: 44,633
  - Estimate (2025): 47,738
  - Rank: 49th of 565 in state 2nd of 40 in county
  - Density: 2,054.5/sq mi (793.2/km^{2})
  - Rank: 291st of 565 in state 15th of 40 in county
- Time zone: UTC−05:00 (Eastern (EST))
  - Summer (DST): UTC−04:00 (Eastern (EDT))
- ZIP Code: 08054
- Area code: 856
- FIPS code: 3400549020
- GNIS feature ID: 0882093
- Website: www.mountlaurel.com

Mount Laurel is a township in Burlington County in the U.S. state of New Jersey. The township, and all of Burlington County, is a part of the Philadelphia metropolitan area. As of the 2020 United States census, the township's population was 44,633, its highest decennial count ever and an increase of 2,769 (+6.6%) from the 2010 census count of 41,864, which in turn reflected an increase of 1,643 (+4.1%) from the 40,221 counted in the 2000 census. It is the home of NFL Films.

In 2020, Mount Laurel was ranked 16th in Money magazine's list of the 50 best places to live in the United States, citing a kid-friendly environment, affordable housing, and easy access to Philadelphia and the Jersey Shore.

== History ==
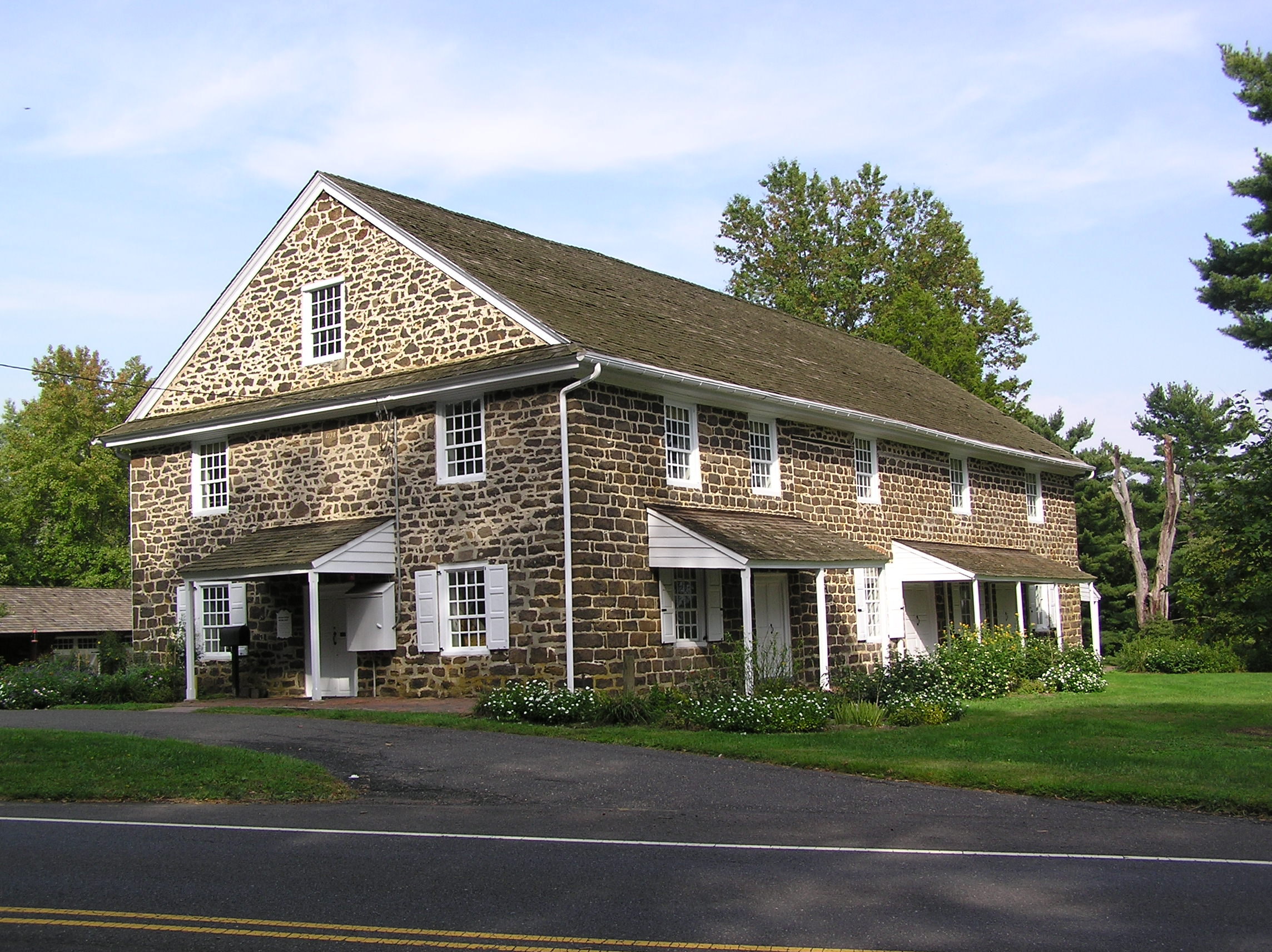
Evesham Friends Meeting House

Mount Laurel was incorporated as a township by an act of the New Jersey Legislature on March 7, 1872, from portions of Evesham Township. The township was named for a hill covered with laurel trees.

Several historical landmarks include General Clinton's headquarters, Paulsdale, Evesham Friends Meeting House, Jacob's Chapel, Hattie Britt School, and Farmer's Hall.

=== Mount Laurel Doctrine ===
The Mount Laurel Doctrine is a final NJ Supreme Court’s interpretation of the New Jersey State Constitution that requires municipalities to use their zoning powers in an affirmative manner to provide a realistic opportunity for the production of housing affordable to low and moderate-income households. The decision was a result of a lawsuit brought against the town by the N.A.A.C.P. that was decided by the New Jersey Supreme Court in 1975 and reaffirmed in a subsequent decision in 1983.

The history behind this, and the story leading to the decision was highlighted in Our Town, a book by David L. Kirp.

Mount Laurel was a small, rural farming community until it was hit with massive suburban growth from Philadelphia in the later 1960s. In 1970, at a meeting about a proposal for taxpayer subsidized housing held at an all-black church in Mount Laurel, Mayor Bill Haines summed up the NIMBYist perspective by saying: "If you people can't afford to live in our town, then you'll just have to leave."

Even though the black families in Mount Laurel were not from urban ghettos and were not involved in gang activity, the new suburban influx thought otherwise, and significantly delayed the creation of tax-payer subsidized housing areas, citing concerns of gang activity and an influx of inner-city criminals. Example comments from town meetings against forced construction of housing projects included "...we need this like Custer needed more Indians..."; "...it's reverse discrimination..."; "...we lived in this in South Philly and Newark...", and that the housing would be a "...breeding ground for violent crime and drug abuse..."

Leading advocate in favor of taxpayer subsidized housing Ethel Lawrence, a black resident who lived her life in Mount Laurel, had her house repeatedly vandalized. Although the court ruled in favor of creating taxpayer subsidized housing, residents did manage to delay the process for decades.

== Geography ==
According to the U.S. Census Bureau, the township had a total area of 21.99 square miles (56.95 km^{2}), including 21.72 square miles (56.26 km^{2}) of land and 0.27 square miles (0.69 km^{2}) of water (1.21%). It is drained by the Delaware River and Parkers Creek (a tributary of Rancocas Creek) and the South Branch Pennsauken Creek flow through its eastern and western portions respectively. Mount Laurel has a humid subtropical climate (Cfa) and average monthly temperatures range from 33.0 °F in January to 76.9 °F in July. The local hardiness zone is 7a.

Ramblewood (with a 2020 Census population of 6,655) is an unincorporated community and census-designated place (CDP) located within Mount Laurel.

Other unincorporated communities, localities and place names located partially or completely within the township include Birchfield, Bougher, Centerton, Colemantown, Coxs Corner, Fellowship, Hartford, Heulings Hill, Masonville, Petersburg, Pine Grove, and Rancocas Woods.

The township borders the municipalities of Evesham Township, Hainesport, Lumberton, Maple Shade, Medford, Moorestown, Westampton and Willingboro in Burlington County; and Cherry Hill in Camden County.

== Demographics ==
Historical population
Census	Pop.	Note	%±
1880	1,739		—
1890	1,699		−2.3%
1900	1,644		−3.2%
1910	1,573		−4.3%
1920	1,667		6.0%
1930	1,929		15.7%
1940	2,189		13.5%
1950	2,817		28.7%
1960	5,249		86.3%
1970	11,221		113.8%
1980	17,614		57.0%
1990	30,270		71.9%
2000	40,221		32.9%
2010	41,864		4.1%
2020	44,633		6.6%
2025 (est.)	47,738		7.0%
Population sources: 1880–2000; 1880–1920 1880–1890; 1890–1910 1910–1930 1940–2000; 2000 2010 2020

=== 2010 census ===
The 2010 United States census counted 41,864 people, 17,538 households, and 11,294 families in the township. The population density was 1,930.0 per square mile (745.2/km^{2}). There were 18,249 housing units at an average density of 841.3 per square mile (324.8/km^{2}). The racial makeup was 79.42% (33,249) White, 9.70% (4,061) Black or African American, 0.16% (67) Native American, 7.26% (3,040) Asian, 0.04% (17) Pacific Islander, 1.00% (418) from other races, and 2.42% (1,012) from two or more races. Hispanic or Latino of any race were 4.56% (1,907) of the population.

Of the 17,538 households, 28.9% had children under the age of 18; 51.0% were married couples living together; 10.5% had a female householder with no husband present and 35.6% were non-families. Of all households, 30.4% were made up of individuals and 11.8% had someone living alone who was 65 years of age or older. The average household size was 2.38 and the average family size was 3.00.

22.3% of the population were under the age of 18, 6.3% from 18 to 24, 26.2% from 25 to 44, 29.2% from 45 to 64, and 16.1% who were 65 years of age or older. The median age was 41.8 years. For every 100 females, the population had 87.4 males. For every 100 females ages 18 and older there were 83.5 males.

The Census Bureau's 2006–2010 American Community Survey showed that (in 2010 inflation-adjusted dollars) median household income was $84,632 (with a margin of error of +/− $5,366) and the median family income was $100,189 (+/− $4,065). Males had a median income of $75,870 (+/− $3,130) versus $54,215 (+/− $2,830) for females. The per capita income for the borough was $41,573 (+/− $1,416). About 3.0% of families and 3.6% of the population were below the poverty line, including 4.6% of those under age 18 and 3.8% of those age 65 or over.

=== 2000 census ===
As of the 2000 United States census there were 40,221 people, 16,570 households, and 11,068 families residing in the township. The population density was 1,844.3 inhabitants per square mile (712.1/km^{2}). There were 17,163 housing units at an average density of 787.0 per square mile (303.9/km^{2}). The racial makeup of the township was 87.10% White, 6.92% African American, 0.09% Native American, 3.80% Asian, 0.03% Pacific Islander, 0.64% from other races, and 1.41% from two or more races. Hispanic or Latino of any race were 2.24% of the population.

There were 16,570 households, out of which 30.4% had children under the age of 18 living with them, 55.7% were married couples living together, 8.5% had a female householder with no husband present, and 33.2% were non-families. 27.9% of all households were made up of individuals, and 8.9% had someone living alone who was 65 years of age or older. The average household size was 2.41 and the average family size was 2.98.

In the township the population was spread out, with 23.1% under the age of 18, 5.4% from 18 to 24, 32.7% from 25 to 44, 24.2% from 45 to 64, and 14.7% who were 65 years of age or older. The median age was 39 years. For every 100 females, there were 89.4 males. For every 100 females age 18 and over, there were 85.8 males.

The median income for a household in the township was $63,750, and the median income for a family was $76,288. Males had a median income of $55,597 versus $37,198 for females. The per capita income for the township was $32,245. About 2.5% of families and 3.1% of the population were below the poverty line, including 3.9% of those under age 18 and 2.9% of those age 65 or over.

== Arts and culture ==
Man Overboard is a pop punk band with multiple members from Mount Laurel.

== Parks and recreation ==
Laurel Acres Park is known for its Veterans Memorial, fishing lake, playground, and grassy hill used for concerts and sledding in the winter when it snows. Laurel Acres Park is right between Church Street at Union Mill Road. The Mount Laurel Baseball League and the Mount Laurel United Soccer Club play in the park's sports fields, and since 2008, the Mount Laurel Premiership. Mount Laurel also includes two dog parks.

The southwestern portion of Rancocas State Park lies within Mount Laurel.

== Government ==
=== Local government ===
Mount Laurel voted to change its form of government in 1970 from a Township Committee form to a Faulkner Act system using the Council-Manager (Plan E), enacted based on the recommendations of a Charter Study Commission as of January 1, 1972. The township is one of 42 municipalities (of the 564) statewide that use this form of government. In this form of government, the Township Manager oversees the daily functions of the Township. The governing body is composed of the Township Council, which is made up of five members elected at-large in partisan elections to serve four-year terms on a staggered basis, with either two or three seats coming up for election in even-numbered years as part of the November general election. At an annual reorganization meeting held in January, the council selects one of its members to serve as mayor and another to serve as deputy mayor, each for a one-year term.

As of 2025 members of the Mount Laurel Township Council are Mayor Nikitas Moustakas (D, term on council ends December 31, 2028), Deputy Mayor Stephen J. Steglik (D, 2026), Fozia Janjua (D, 2028), Kareem A. Pritchett Sr. (D, 2026) and Silvia Catalan-Culnan (D, 2028).

==== Public safety ====
Public safety in the township is the responsibility of the Mount Laurel Police Department, which operates under Chief Timothy Hudnall. The department received its initial accreditation from the New Jersey State Association of Chiefs of Police in 2009.

Based on data from 2025, Mount Laurel is more dangerous than 83% of every other town and city of all sizes in the State of New Jersey, and more dangerous than 82% of all other U.S. cities. The chance of becoming a victim of either violent or property crime in Mount Laurel is 1 in 46. Based on FBI crime data, the chance that a person will become a victim of a violent crime in Mount Laurel - such as armed robbery, aggravated assault, rape or murder - is 1 in 540. This equates to a rate of 2 per one thousand inhabitants. And Mount Laurel's rate for property crime is 20 per one thousand population.

=== Federal, state, and county representation ===
Mount Laurel Township is located in the 3rd Congressional District and is part of New Jersey's 7th state legislative district.

For the 119th United States Congress, New Jersey's 3rd congressional district is currently represented Herb Conaway (D, Delran Township). New Jersey is represented in the United States Senate by Democrats Cory Booker (Newark, term ends 2027) and Andy Kim (Moorestown, term ends 2031).

For the 2026–2027 session, the 7th legislative district of the New Jersey Legislature is represented in the State Senate by Troy Singleton (D, Palmyra) and in the General Assembly by Carol A. Murphy (D, Mount Laurel) and Balvir Singh (D, Burlington Township).

Burlington County is governed by a Board of County Commissioners comprised of five members who are chosen at-large in partisan elections to serve three-year terms of office on a staggered basis, with either one or two seats coming up for election each year; at an annual reorganization meeting, the board selects a director and deputy director from among its members to serve a one-year term. As of 2026, Burlington County's Commissioners are: Director Felicia Hopson (D, Willingboro Township, term as commissioner ends December 31, 2027; term as director ends 2026), Deputy Director Allison Eckel (D, Medford, term as commissioner ends 2028; term as deputy director ends 2026), Randy Brolo (D, Lumberton, 2026; elected to an unexpired term), Tyler Burrell (D, Delran Township, 2027) and Tom Pullion (D, Edgewater Park, 2026).

Burlington County's constitutional officers are Clerk Joanne Schwartz (D, Southampton Township, 2028), Sheriff James H. Kostoplis (D, Bordentown, 2028) and Surrogate Brian J. Carlin (D, Burlington Township, 2026).

=== Politics ===
United States presidential election results for Mount Laurel 2024 2020 2016 2012 2008 2004
Year	Republican		Democratic		Third party(ies)	
Year	No.	%	No.	%	No.	%
2024	9,079	37.13%	15,018	61.42%	354	1.45%
2020	10,003	35.98%	17,452	62.77%	346	1.24%
2016	8,875	38.91%	13,155	57.67%	781	3.42%
2012	9,797	43.30%	12,634	55.84%	194	0.86%
2008	9,657	41.45%	13,420	57.60%	220	0.94%
2004	10,382	46.88%	11,618	52.46%	146	0.66%

As of March 2011, there were a total of 28,317 registered voters in Mount Laurel Township, of which 9,089 (32.1% vs. 33.3% countywide) were registered as Democrats, 6,880 (24.3% vs. 23.9%) were registered as Republicans and 12,328 (43.5% vs. 42.8%) were registered as Unaffiliated. There were 20 voters registered to other parties. Among the township's 2010 Census population, 67.6% (vs. 61.7% in Burlington County) were registered to vote, including 87.0% of those ages 18 and over (vs. 80.3% countywide).

In the 2012 presidential election, Democrat Barack Obama received 12,634 votes (55.5% vs. 58.1% countywide), ahead of Republican Mitt Romney with 9,797 votes (43.0% vs. 40.2%) and other candidates with 194 votes (0.9% vs. 1.0%), among the 22,762 ballots cast by the township's 29,792 registered voters, for a turnout of 76.4% (vs. 74.5% in Burlington County). In the 2008 presidential election, Democrat Barack Obama received 13,420 votes (57.2% vs. 58.4% countywide), ahead of Republican John McCain with 9,657 votes (41.2% vs. 39.9%) and other candidates with 220 votes (0.9% vs. 1.0%), among the 23,443 ballots cast by the township's 28,847 registered voters, for a turnout of 81.3% (vs. 80.0% in Burlington County). In the 2004 presidential election, Democrat John Kerry received 11,618 votes (52.3% vs. 52.9% countywide), ahead of Republican George W. Bush with 10,382 votes (46.7% vs. 46.0%) and other candidates with 146 votes (0.7% vs. 0.8%), among the 22,231 ballots cast by the township's 27,385 registered voters, for a turnout of 81.2% (vs. 78.8% in the whole county).

Gubernatorial election results for Mount Laurel
Year	Republican		Democratic		Third party(ies)	
Year	No.	%	No.	%	No.	%
2025	7,313	35.15%	13,397	64.39%	97	0.47%
2021	6,980	41.94%	9,576	57.54%	86	0.52%
2017	5,108	40.41%	7,335	58.03%	197	1.56%
2013	8,696	65.95%	4,341	32.92%	148	1.12%
2009	7,082	50.75%	6,149	44.06%	725	5.19%
2005	6,078	46.50%	6,521	49.89%	471	3.60%

In the 2013 gubernatorial election, Republican Chris Christie received 8,696 votes (65.1% vs. 61.4% countywide), ahead of Democrat Barbara Buono with 4,341 votes (32.5% vs. 35.8%) and other candidates with 148 votes (1.1% vs. 1.2%), among the 13,354 ballots cast by the township's 29,635 registered voters, yielding a 45.1% turnout (vs. 44.5% in the county). In the 2009 gubernatorial election, Republican Chris Christie received 7,082 votes (50.4% vs. 47.7% countywide), ahead of Democrat Jon Corzine with 6,149 votes (43.8% vs. 44.5%), Independent Chris Daggett with 617 votes (4.4% vs. 4.8%) and other candidates with 108 votes (0.8% vs. 1.2%), among the 14,047 ballots cast by the township's 29,086 registered voters, yielding a 48.3% turnout (vs. 44.9% in the county).

United States Senate election results for Mount Laurel1
Year	Republican		Democratic		Third party(ies)	
Year	No.	%	No.	%	No.	%
2024	8,201	34.31%	15,335	64.16%	365	1.53%
2018	8,304	41.54%	10,775	53.91%	909	4.55%
2012	9,361	43.24%	12,137	56.07%	149	0.69%
2006	6,254	46.66%	6,899	51.47%	251	1.87%

United States Senate election results for Mount Laurel2
Year	Republican		Democratic		Third party(ies)	
Year	No.	%	No.	%	No.	%
2020	10,164	37.26%	16,871	61.85%	244	0.89%
2014	5,714	46.66%	6,391	52.19%	140	1.14%
2013	3,649	45.36%	4,326	53.78%	69	0.86%
2008	9,588	44.50%	11,714	54.37%	242	1.12%

== Education ==
The Mount Laurel Schools serve public school students in pre-kindergarten through eighth grade. The grade configuration includes six schools serving pre-kindergarten / kindergarten through fourth-grade students. Students are assigned on a geographic basis to one of the six K–4 schools; Countryside serves the township's northwest; Fleetwood, the northeast; Hillside covers the north central portion of the township; Larchmont, a piece of the eastern side; Parkway, covers the western portion; and Springville the southern tip. All students from the six K–4 schools feed into a single upper elementary school (for grades 5 and 6) and middle school (grades 7 and 8). As of the 2018–19 school year, the district, comprised of eight schools, had an enrollment of 4,214 students and 350.0 classroom teachers (on an FTE basis), for a student–teacher ratio of 12.0:1. Schools in the district (with 2018–19 enrollment data from the National Center for Education Statistics) are Countryside Elementary School (with 309 students; in grades Pre-K–4), Fleetwood Elementary School (372; K–4), Hillside Elementary School (348; Pre-K–4), Larchmont Elementary School (395; K–4), Parkway Elementary School (342; K–4), Springville Elementary School (512; Pre-K–4), Mount Laurel Hartford School (961; 5–6) and Thomas E. Harrington Middle School (963; 7–8). Parkway Elementary School was one of four schools in New Jersey recognized by the National Blue Ribbon Schools Program, awarded by the United States Department of Education, for the 2005–2006 school year.

Public school students from Mount Laurel in ninth through twelfth grades attend Lenape High School, located in Medford. As of the 2018–2019 school year, the high school had an enrollment of 1,895 students and 156.6 classroom teachers (on an FTE basis), for a student–teacher ratio of 12.1:1. Lenape High School is part of the Lenape Regional High School District, a regional secondary school district in Burlington County that also serves the eight municipalities of Evesham Township, Medford Lakes, Medford, Shamong Township, Southampton, Tabernacle and Woodland Township at its four high schools.

Students from Mount Laurel, and from all of Burlington County, are eligible to attend the Burlington County Institute of Technology, a countywide public school district that serves the vocational and technical education needs of students at the high school and post-secondary level at its campuses in Medford and Westampton.

== Transportation ==
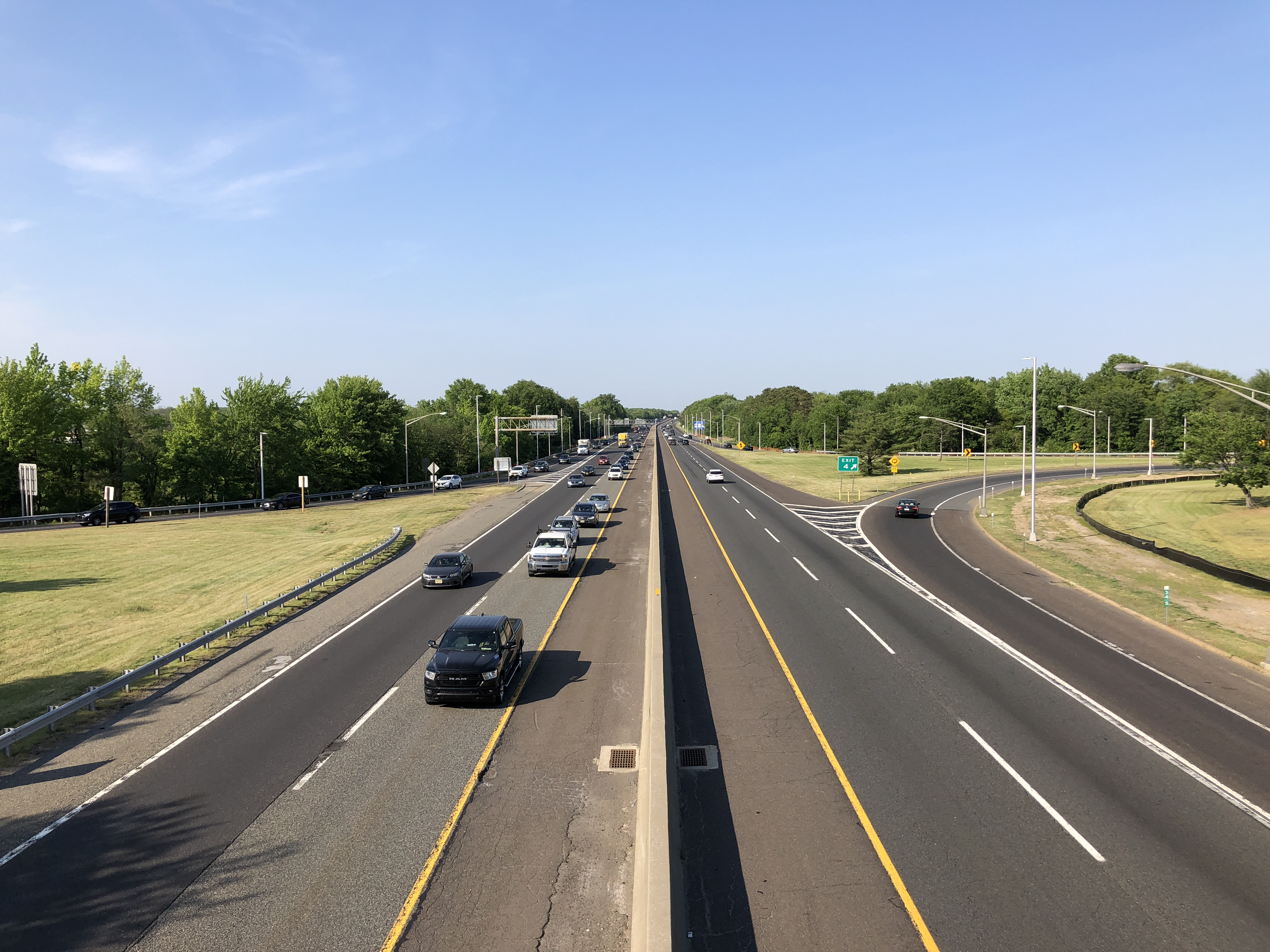
New Jersey Turnpike northbound in Mount Laurel

=== Roads and highways ===
As of May 2010, the township had a total of 170.19 miles (273.89 km) of roadways, of which 115.86 miles (186.46 km) were maintained by the municipality, 33.26 miles (53.53 km) by Burlington County and 13.55 miles (21.81 km) by the New Jersey Department of Transportation and 7.52 miles (12.10 km) by the New Jersey Turnpike Authority.

Several major roadways traverse through Mount Laurel. The New Jersey Turnpike is the most prominent highway, entering from Cherry Hill in the township's southwest corner and continuing for about 7.5 miles (12.1 km) to Westampton at Mount Laurel's northern edge. The Turnpike's James Fenimore Cooper rest area is located within the township on the northbound side at milepost 39.4. The only exit within Mount Laurel is Exit 4, which provides access to Route 73.

I-295 passes through the township, with three exits: (Exit 36: Berlin/Tacony Bridge/Route 73, Exit 40: Moorestown/Mount Holly/Route 38, and Exit 43: Delran/Rancocas Woods). Other major thoroughfares through Mount Laurel are Route 38, Route 73 and CR 537.

=== Public transportation ===
NJ Transit provides bus service to and from Philadelphia on routes 317 (from Asbury Park), the 413 route between Camden and Burlington and the 457 route between Moorestown Mall and Camden.

== Notable people ==
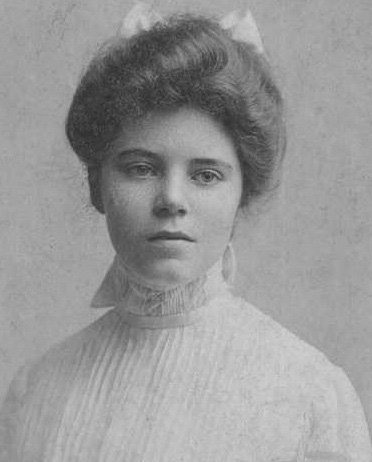
Alice Paul

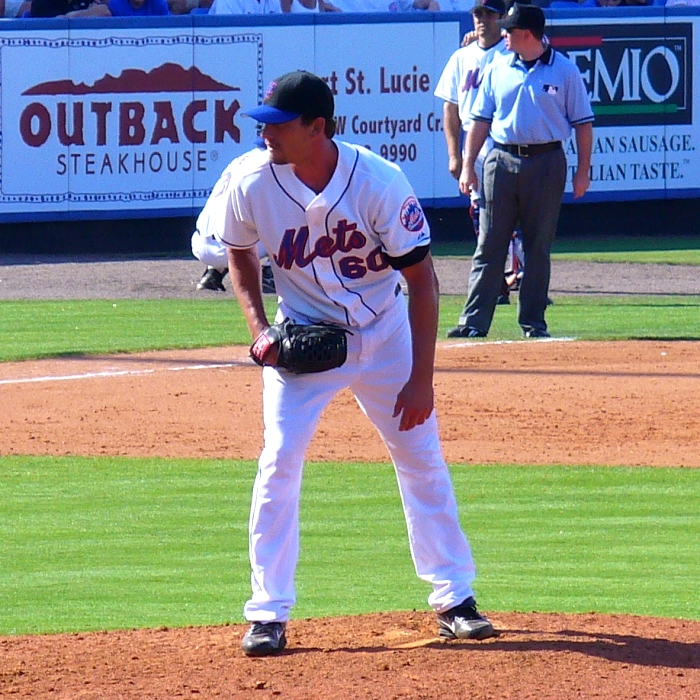
Scott Schoeneweis

People who were born in, residents of, or otherwise closely associated with Mount Laurel include:

- Brian Aitken (born 1983), convicted and sentenced to seven years in prison for possessing handguns legally purchased in Colorado and transported in New Jersey from one residence to another; subsequently granted executive clemency from Governor Chris Christie
- James Berardinelli (born 1967), film critic
- Frank Budd (1939–2014), wide receiver who played in the National Football League for the Philadelphia Eagles and the Washington Redskins
- Larry Chatzidakis (born 1949), represented the 8th Legislative District in the New Jersey General Assembly from 1997 to 2008 and served on the Mount Laurel Township Council from 1985 to 2000, serving as mayor in 1988, 1992, 1996 and 2000
- Harold L. Colburn Jr. (1925–2012), physician and politician who served in the New Jersey General Assembly representing the 8th Legislative District from 1984 to 1995
- Chris DeStefano, Grammy Award-winning singer/songwriter, record producer and multi instrumentalist
- Matt Duke (born 1985), singer-songwriter/musician
- Ken Dunek (born 1957), former professional American football tight end who played in the NFL for the Philadelphia Eagles and in the USFL for the Philadelphia/Baltimore Stars
- Todd Fedoruk (born 1979), former NHL winger who played for the Philadelphia Flyers
- Christina Foggie (born 1992), professional basketball player, who was drafted in 2014 by the Minnesota Lynx of the WNBA
- C. William Haines (1928–1996), politician who served in the New Jersey General Assembly from the 8th Legislative District from 1982 to 1985 and in the New Jersey Senate from 1985 until his death
- Marielle Hall (born 1992), long-distance runner who represented the United States in the Women's 10,000 meters final at the 2016 Summer Olympics in Rio de Janeiro, Brazil
- Neil Hartman, Comcast SportsNet sports anchor
- Darling Hill (born 1989), artistic gymnast
- Victor Hobson (born 1980), former linebacker for the New York Jets
- Jirair Hovnanian (1927–2007), home builder whose business developed and built over 6,000 houses throughout South Jersey
- Sara Keane (born 1991), soccer goalkeeper who played for FC Kansas City of the National Women's Soccer League
- John Kruk (born 1961), former Major League Baseball player, notably with the Philadelphia Phillies
- Ethel Lawrence (1926–1984), civil rights activist who was the lead plaintiff in the litigation for affordable housing in Mount Laurel, which led to the New Jersey Fair Housing Act, the New Jersey Council on Affordable Housing and the Mount Laurel doctrine
- Francis Leo Lawrence (1937–2013), educator, scholar specializing in French literature and university administrator, who served from 1990 to 2002 as the 18th president of Rutgers University
- Carli Lloyd (born 1982), member of United States women's national soccer team who played professionally for NJ/NY Gotham FC
- John Mazur (1930–2013), American football player and coach, who was quarterback for the Notre Dame Fighting Irish football team and served as head coach for the New England Patriots from 1970 to 1972
- Carol A. Murphy (born 1962 or 1963), politician who has represented the 7th Legislative District in the New Jersey General Assembly since 2018
- Gregg Murphy, sports journalist who has been a broadcaster for the Philadelphia Phillies
- John A. Nagy (1946–2016), author of books about espionage and mutinies of the American Revolution
- Alice Paul (1885–1977), leader of a campaign for women's suffrage resulting in passage of the 19th Amendment
- Fabiana Pierre-Louis (born 1980), attorney and jurist serving as an associate justice on the Supreme Court of New Jersey
- Joe Pisarcik (born 1952), former professional football quarterback who played in the NFL for the New York Giants and Philadelphia Eagles
- John Reid (born 1996), American football cornerback for the Houston Texans of the NFL
- Dave Robinson (born 1941), Pro Football Hall of Fame enshrinee who played for Moorestown High School, Penn State University, the Green Bay Packers and the Washington Redskins
- Sav Rocca (born 1973), former Australian rules footballer and NFL punter
- Anne Rosenberg, surgical oncologist.
- Jon Runyan (born 1973), U.S. Congressman who played offensive tackle for the Philadelphia Eagles
- Scott Schoeneweis (born 1973), a relief pitcher who played in MLB for the New York Mets
- Jill Scott (born 1972), soul and R&B singer-songwriter, poet, and actress
- Vai Sikahema (born 1962), former punt returner for the Philadelphia Eagles, currently a morning news anchor for NBC 10 in Philadelphia
- Slushii (born 1997), stage name of disc jockey and electronic music producer, Julian Scanlan
- Inge Sørensen (1924–2011), swimmer from Denmark, who became the youngest known female Olympic Games medalist in an individual event when she won the bronze medal in the 200 m breaststroke at the 1936 Summer Olympics at the age of 12 years and 24 days
- Jason Thompson (born 1986), former professional basketball player who played in the NBA with the Sacramento Kings
- Ryan Thompson (born 1988), professional basketball player
- Bryan Warrick (born 1959), former professional basketball player who played five seasons in the NBA
- Stephen M. Wolownik (1946–2000), pioneer in the Russian and Eastern European music community in the United States
- Kenie Wright (born 1997), soccer player who plays as a midfielder for Sky Blue FC in the NWSL
