= New Jersey Housing and Mortgage Finance Agency =

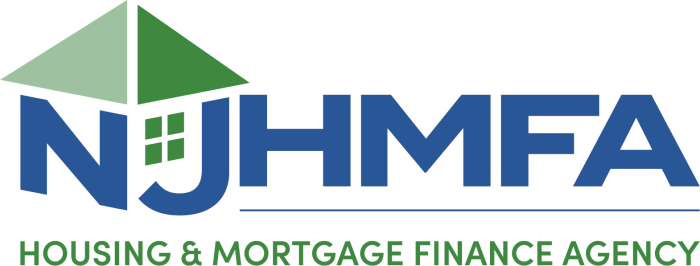
- Official logo of NJHMFA

Agency overview
- Formed: January 17, 1984
- Jurisdiction: Government of New Jersey
- Headquarters: 637 South Clinton Avenue, Trenton, New Jersey, U.S.
- Agency executive: Melanie R. Walter, Executive Director
- Parent department: New Jersey Department of Community Affairs
- Website: njhousing.gov

The New Jersey Housing and Mortgage Finance Agency (NJHMFA) is a state government agency in New Jersey dedicated to increasing the availability of affordable housing and homeownership opportunities. It was established in 1983 by the consolidation of the New Jersey Housing Finance Agency and the New Jersey Mortgage Finance Agency into a single organization. NJHMFA operates as an affiliate of the New Jersey Department of Community Affairs (DCA) and is headquartered in Trenton, New Jersey. The agency provides financing for affordable rental housing development and assists first-time homebuyers with low-interest mortgages and down payment assistance programs.

== History ==
NJHMFA was created by an act of the New Jersey Legislature known as the "New Jersey Housing and Mortgage Finance Agency Law of 1983" (P.L.1983, c.530), which took effect on January 17, 1984. The law merged two predecessor agencies – the New Jersey Housing Finance Agency (HFA, established 1967) and the New Jersey Mortgage Finance Agency (MFA, established 1970) – into a single entity, in order to serve as a “strong, unified advocate for housing production, finance and improvement” in the state. Throughout the 1980s and 1990s, NJHMFA expanded its financing programs for both rental housing and homeownership, issuing tax-exempt bonds and beginning in 1987 serving as the state’s allocator of federal Low-Income Housing Tax Credits for affordable housing projects. In 2005, the agency began administering the Special Needs Housing Trust Fund, which was created that year with a $200 million bond issue to finance supportive housing for individuals with special needs.

During the late 2000s housing market crisis, NJHMFA implemented foreclosure prevention and mortgage relief initiatives. It provided over $320 million in assistance to more than 8,000 homeowners and offered free housing counseling to help prevent foreclosures in the wake of the 2008 recession. In the aftermath of Hurricane Sandy in 2012, the agency helped finance the development of thousands of housing units for displaced residents as part of the state’s recovery efforts. In 2021, Governor Phil Murphy signed legislation to restore funding to the depleted Special Needs Housing Trust Fund by dedicating $20 million annually from real estate transfer fees, ensuring the continuation of NJHMFA’s supportive housing programs for special needs populations. The agency marked its 40th anniversary in 2024, by which time its programs had assisted hundreds of thousands of New Jersey residents through various housing initiatives.

== Programs and initiatives ==
Multifamily housing finance: NJHMFA is a primary financier of affordable rental housing in New Jersey. It issues taxable and tax-exempt revenue bonds and allocates federal Low-Income Housing Tax Credits (LIHTC) to support the construction and rehabilitation of affordable apartments. Since its inception, the agency has financed over 70,000 rental units statewide, the majority of which are affordable to low- and moderate-income households. NJHMFA’s administration of the LIHTC program has leveraged private investment for affordable housing development; as of 2024, the agency oversaw over $1.3 billion annually in multifamily housing production through its financing programs. In addition, NJHMFA offers programs targeting community redevelopment and specialized housing needs, such as supportive housing for people with disabilities or special needs (funded via the Special Needs Housing Trust Fund).

Homeownership programs: The agency provides low-interest mortgages and other assistance to encourage homeownership among first-time buyers and low- and moderate-income households. NJHMFA’s single-family loan programs offer 30-year fixed-rate mortgages through participating lenders, often combined with down payment and closing cost assistance. The flagship Down Payment Assistance Program provides eligible first-time homebuyers with up to $15,000 as an interest-free, forgivable second loan to help cover upfront costs. In 2023, NJHMFA introduced a First-Generation Homebuyer Down Payment Assistance Program, offering an additional $7,000 in forgivable assistance to first-time buyers whose parents or guardians have never owned a home, bringing the total possible aid to $22,000 for those qualified. Beyond first-time buyer programs, NJHMFA also administers specialized mortgage initiatives such as the Police and Firemen’s Retirement System Mortgage Program, which provides favorable home loans to active members of law enforcement and firefighting through the investment of state pension funds.

New Jersey Housing Resource Center (NJHRC): Operated by NJHMFA, the New Jersey Housing Resource Center is an online platform designed to help New Jersey residents locate affordable housing options across the state. The NJHRC connects renters, homeowners, developers, and housing providers with up-to-date listings of available rental units, homes for sale, and accessible housing opportunities. It also provides information on emergency housing programs and disaster recovery housing availability. The NJHRC is particularly valuable for low-income individuals, people with disabilities, and households affected by natural disasters seeking temporary or permanent housing solutions.

Foreclosure prevention and housing stability: NJHMFA plays a role in helping homeowners avoid foreclosure during economic downturns. After the 2008 financial crisis, the agency used federal and state funds (such as the Hardest Hit Fund program, known in New Jersey as HomeKeeper) to assist homeowners in default or at risk of foreclosure. NJHMFA provided emergency mortgage relief and counseling services, which benefited over 8,000 families statewide in the post-2008 period. More recently, in response to the COVID-19 pandemic, the agency launched the Emergency Rescue Mortgage Assistance (ERMA) program in 2021 to help households behind on their mortgages. The ERMA program delivered more than $150 million in relief payments to approximately 5,000 New Jersey homeowners, preventing foreclosures and housing instability during the pandemic.

== Organization and leadership ==
NJHMFA is structured as an independent authority “in, but not of” the Department of Community Affairs. It is governed by a board of directors with nine members. The DCA Commissioner serves ex officio as the chair of the NJHMFA board, alongside four other state officials (the State Treasurer, Attorney General, Commissioner of Human Services, and Commissioner of Banking and Insurance) who serve as ex officio members. The remaining four board seats are filled by public members appointed by the Governor with State Senate consent, each bringing expertise in housing, finance, or community development.

Day-to-day management of the agency is led by an Executive Director, who is appointed by the board. The current Executive Director is Melanie R. Walter, who assumed the role in January 2021. Walter succeeded Charles Richman, who served from 2018 to 2020. Previous executive directors include Anthony L. Marchetta, who served from 2010 to 2017.
