= Ethel Lawrence =

American civil rights activist

Ethel Robinson Lawrence (March 16, 1926 - July 19, 1994) was a civil rights activist who was known as the "Rosa Parks of affordable housing." Lawrence was the lead plaintiff in the Mount Laurel, New Jersey, litigation for affordable housing, which led to the New Jersey Fair Housing Act, the New Jersey Council on Affordable Housing (COAH) and the Mount Laurel doctrine. In her final years, Lawrence worked closely with attorney Peter O'Connor to start the non-profit organization Fair Share Housing Development Inc., which built over 200 units for moderate- to low-income tenants in Mount Laurel.

== Early life ==
Lawrence was the second of eight children born to Mary and Leslie Robinson. Lawrence's ancestors had resided in Mount Laurel, New Jersey, since the 19th century, when her slave ancestors had used the Underground Railroad stations organized by the Quakers who had made the Mount Laurel area a sanctuary to runaways during the Civil War. Growing up, Lawrence attended the segregated school on Moorestown-Mount Laurel Road. Lawrence's mother, Mary, was a religious and civic-minded woman, who instilled similar values in all her children. At her mother's urging, 16-year-old Lawrence, with other African American youth, demanded to be seated in the "whites only" section of a local movie theater.

== Adult life ==
Lawrence met and married Thomas Lawrence (who died in 1979), and together, they reared nine children: four boys and five girls. In 1955, Ethel and Thomas purchased their own home in Mount Laurel. Struggling to maintain their home and support their children, Lawrence decided to enroll in college at the Bank Street College of Education in New York and received a degree in early childhood education. She went on to be employed as a pre-school teacher for Daycare 100.

Lawrence's civil rights work placed a significant and often dangerous burden on her family, specifically her children. One of her daughters, Ethel Lawrence-Halley, remembers, "At first, some of the kids we used to play with told us they wouldn't play with us anymore. My sister and I had dogs set on us while we were walking. Then came the words and the threats. I'd never been called the N-word in my life until then. People called my mother a troublemaking bitch. We had to change our phone number so many times I lost count. The worst it got was when somebody shot out my mother's bedroom window." However, Lawrence persisted in her civic work because she believed that her family and her neighbors' families had the same rights to affordable housing as the new wealthy, suburban residents.

=== Mount Laurel I ===
Lawrence was an officer, pianist, and director of the Young People's Dept. (YPD) of Jacob's Chapel, A.M.E. (African Methodist Episcopal) Church in Mount Laurel. Around 1960, Mount Laurel officials were condemning and tearing down the substandard homes of many "lower-income" people; however, no efforts were made to assist them in relocating elsewhere in Mount Laurel. As a result, Lawrence, along with Reverend Stuart Wood and other church members, formed a non-profit corporation, called The Springville Community Action Committee, to develop low- and moderate-income housing. In 1969, the Township zoning board denied the 36-unit housing project proposed by the Action Committee, with Bill Haines, the Mayor at the time, saying, "If you people can't afford to live in our town, then you'll just have to leave."

Outraged, the Committee sued. At Camden Regional Legal Services, three young lawyers—Peter O'Connor, Carl Bisgaier, and Ken Meiser—took on their case, with Lawrence agreeing to be the lead plaintiff. The lawsuit accused the township of using its zoning laws to discriminate against poor residents. In 1975, the Supreme Court of New Jersey ruled in favor of Lawrence in a ruling called Mount Laurel I. Mount Laurel I holds that all New Jersey municipalities have an obligation under the New Jersey Constitution to provide their fair share of the region's need for low-income and moderate-income housing.

However, in 1976, in response to the ruling, Mount Laurel Township changed its zoning law, allowing the low-income housing project to be built but on unstable, swampy land. As a result, Lawrence and her neighbors returned to court.

=== Mount Laurel II ===
In 1983, the Supreme Court of New Jersey again ruled in favor of Lawrence and the other plaintiffs in a ruling known as Mount Laurel II. In the second ruling, the courts specified how many units of affordable housing should be built in the township and instructed lower court judges to set similar goals for other towns. The decision only increased controversy among suburban communities, with many fair share numbers doubling the housing stock and increasing worry among wealthy residents who feared that their communities would be invaded by hordes of "poor people" bringing crime, higher taxes, and lower property values

=== Fair Housing Act and Council on Affordable Housing ===
As a result of many disputes and under pressure from municipalities that objected to the Mount Laurel rulings, the New Jersey Legislature passed the Fair Housing Act of 1985. The Act created a Council on Affordable Housing and an administrative process for setting local housing goals.

The compromise piece of legislation was met with annoyance by both sides. The Council recalled the state's affordable housing need by reducing it from the 277,808 reached by the court to 145,707. The Council also allowed municipalities to reduce their quotas even further by crediting them for subsidized apartments built since 1980 and for environmentally sensitive land that was considered unbuildable. They also could count renovated houses and accessory apartments tucked in basements and garages towards their totals. The most controversial act set by the Council allowed municipalities to reduce their housing obligations by up to one half by making a one-time payment to another municipality (usually poor and urban) that agreed to accept their housing obligation.

=== Mount Laurel III ===
Despite Mount Laurel I and II, the Fair Housing Act, and the Council on Affordable Housing, the law and its provisions continued to be challenged in court, with talk in the legislature of denying the permanent nomination of Chief Justice Wilentz, the judge responsible for the ruling of Mount Laurel II, to the Supreme Court of the United States. In February 1986, the State Supreme Court issued another decision, now referred to as Mount Laurel III, which unanimously upheld the law as constitutional and consistent with Mount Laurel I and II.

=== Fair Share Housing Development, Inc. ===
In 1986, attorney Peter O'Connor founded a non-profit organization called Fair Share Housing Development Inc. Lawrence was named the charter president of the board of trustees of the company. According to its website, "The mission of Fair Share Housing Development (FSHD) is to promote economically and racially diverse communities throughout the tri-county region surrounding the City of Camden, New Jersey through the development of affordable housing with supportive services in an effort to improve the lives of moderate-income, low-income and very low-income families, the elderly and disabled and to reverse decades of decline and segregation in the City of Camden by providing Camden City residents with the choice to reside in affordable housing in high-opportunity communities with access to decent jobs, good schools, and a safe environment." In May 1994, Lawrence's daughter Ethel Lawrence-Halley was named administrator of the Mount Laurel project.

However, Lawrence would not live to see the township grant final approval for the construction of 100 subsidized townhouses to Fair Share Housing, the first phase of Ethel R. Lawrence Homes (ERLH). It was only in 1997 that the Mount Laurel Planning Board finally approved the nonprofit's request to build. Following the first phase, two other phases were built in 2003 (ERLH II - 40 units) and 2018 (ERLH III - 36 units). A nearby development in Mount Laurel called Robinson Estates, named after Ethel's mother, Mary, features 24 single-family homes, a rarity in affordable housing, and was built in 2018 as part of the redevelopment project that led to the construction of ERLH III.

Lawrence died from cancer on July 19, 1994, at the age of 68.
