= Lori Grifa =

Lawyer in New Jersey

- Appointed by: Chris Christie
- Succeeded by: Rich Constable

Commissioner of the New Jersey Department of Community Affairs

Personal details
- Born: Lori Grifa
- Party: Democratic
- Education: Rutgers University; Boston College School of Law

Lori Grifa is a judge of the Superior Court of the State of New Jersey, assigned to the Criminal Division of the Essex County vicinage. She was nominated by Governor Phil Murphy to the position on December 13, 2021 and confirmed by the New Jersey Senate on January 10, 2022.

Prior being appointed to the bench, Grifa was an attorney in private practice and a partner at Archer & Greiner, PC. She was formerly a partner at Wolff & Samson, PC, a law firm founded by former NJ Attorney General David Samson. Grifa served as Commissioner of the New Jersey Department of Community Affairs in 2010 to 2012 during the governorship of Chris Christie.

Raised in Toms River, New Jersey, Grifa graduated from Toms River High School East in 1981. In 1985, she earned her BA cum laude, from Rutgers University, where she was a Henry Rutgers Thesis Scholar and member of Phi Beta Kappa. Grifa graduated from the Boston College School of Law in 1988, and served as law clerk to Judge Elbert Tuttle of the Massachusetts Superior Court. She is a member of the Bar in New York, New Jersey, Massachusetts and the District of Columbia.

She was a special assistant district attorney in the Homicide Investigation Unit of the New York County District Attorney's Office for two years and was a senior assistant district attorney in the Office of the Brooklyn District Attorney in New York City. from 1989 to 1997, where she specialized in homicide and gang-related prosecutions.

From 2002 to 2003, Grifa served as chief of staff to New Jersey Attorney General David Samson. In that capacity, she was responsible for managing the New Jersey Department of Law & Public Safety.

Grifa was appointed by the chief justice of the New Jersey Supreme Court to the Committee for Women and the Courts and the State Domestic Violence Working Group as District V-A Attorney Ethics Committee, on which served a four-year term from 2008 to 2012.

Grifa served in Governor Chris Christie's Cabinet as the commissioner of the New Jersey Department of Community Affairs from 2010 until her resignation on January 2, 2012. During her tenure, she also chaired the New Jersey Meadowlands Commission, the New Jersey Redevelopment Agency, the New Jersey Council on Affordable Housing and the New Jersey Housing Mortgage Finance Agency.

== See also ==
- Governorship of Chris Christie
