= Ramblewood =

Ramblewood may refer to a location in the United States:

- Ramblewood, New Jersey, a census-designated place
- Ramblewood, Pennsylvania, a census-designated place
- Ramblewood, Baltimore, Maryland, a neighborhood in north Baltimore
