= Mount Laurel doctrine =

Judicial interpretation of the New Jersey State Constitution

The Mount Laurel doctrine is a significant judicial doctrine of the New Jersey State Constitution. The doctrine requires that municipalities use their zoning powers in an affirmative manner to provide a realistic opportunity for the production of housing affordable to low- and moderate-income households. In the 2020s, criticisms that the doctrine produces suburban overdevelopment were the subject of political disagreement in the state.

== Initial development ==
The doctrine takes its name from the lead case in which it was first pronounced by the New Jersey Supreme Court in 1975: Southern Burlington County N.A.A.C.P. v. Mount Laurel Township (commonly called Mount Laurel I), in which the plaintiffs challenged the zoning ordinance of Mount Laurel Township, New Jersey, on the grounds that it operated to exclude low and moderate income persons from obtaining housing in the municipality.

Ethel Lawrence, a sixth-generation resident of Mount Laurel Township, was the lead plaintiff in the original Mt. Laurel case after officials in Mt. Laurel Township declared their intention of condemning and tearing down the low-income housing in her community. With no realistic alternative other than moving to the slums of Camden or Philadelphia, many residents grew increasingly concerned about the rising pressure to leave. After the decision in Mount Laurel I, suits were filed against numerous municipalities.

== 2020s legislation ==
The A4/S50 New Jersey law, signed in 2024, requires towns to plan for and allow more affordable housing. It updated how housing obligations are calculated and enforced. It also abolished the Council on Affordable Housing (COAH) and shifed oversight away from that agency.

== Fair Share Housing Center ==
Fair Share Housing Center (FSHC) is a Cherry Hill-based nonprofit organization that litigates against towns in enforcement of fair housing development and one of the most prominent affordable housing advocates in New Jersey. In support of the Mount Laurel doctrube, the group cites research that without mandates for affordable housing, exclusionary zoning drives to prices, particularly for poor people, and increasing the cost of rent costs and so having more affordable housing results in lower rents.

FSHC was founded in 1975 after the landmark Mount Laurel I ruling, which declared that all municipalities in New Jersey must provide their fair share of affordable housing. The organization was founded by the plaintiffs, including both the community leaders and their attorneys, of Mount Laurel I. In 2015, when the New Jersey Supreme Court eliminated COAH and replaced it with a new system in which lower courts had dedicated Mount Laurel judges, who oversaw the municipal housing plans, FSHC was also granted an official role monitoring compliance with affordable housing laws throughout the state.

== Builder's Remedy ==
A builder's remedy is a legal mechanism that can be used to expedite the construction of low or middle income housing when a municipality fails to comply with its Mount Laurel obligations.

In 1983, the New Jersey Supreme Court reaffirmed the basic premise of Mount Laurel I in Southern Burlington County NAACP v. Township of Mount Laurel (also referred to as Mount Laurel II), 92 N.J. 158 (1983), and made the doctrine enforceable by giving developers an incentive to initiate exclusionary zoning suits. This incentive came to be known as the “builder’s remedy.”

When a builder proposes a development that includes affordable housing and a municipality denies the proposal for violating local zoning codes, the developer may challenge the denial on the grounds that the municipality has not complied with the Mount Laurel doctrine. If a court determines that the municipality had not complied with the Mount Laurel doctrine, the court may permit the developer to construct the project despite violations to the local zoning code and invalidate the offending zoning provision for excluding affordable housing.

== Qualified urban aid municipalities ==
Under the Mount Laurel framework, while their housing need projections are still calculated, qualified urban aid municipalities ("QUAMs") are exempt from compliance. QUAM status is not permanent and so a municipality that was exempt during one Mount Laurel round may not be in the next. For example, during Round 3, Monroe Township, Brick, Penns Grove, Phillipsburg, and Neptune Township were exempt as QUAM but not during Round 4, and Bergenfield, Cliffside Park, Nutley, Harrison, Kearny, and Glassboro gained QUAM status and so became exempt.

== Criticism ==
Some politicians and talk radio personalities held hearings or called for protests based on the idea that the doctrine would add too much development and cause suburban sprawl to worsen. As one example, in 2025, gubernatorial candidate Jack Ciaterelli claimed that the model "is gobbling up open space, chasing wildlife from its habitat, increasing pollution from more idling cars on already congested roads, leading to more local flooding from stormwater management issues, and driving up property taxes due to endless legal fees and additional local services." He did not provide evidence to link those sprawl issues to the doctrine, but his statement echos predictions made a decade earlier by Assembly Member Holly Schepisi, radio personality Bill Spadea, and Montgomery Township Mayor Ed Trzaska. Trzaska, for example, predicted apartment development which would "overwhelm the township's infrastructure, greatly increase property taxes and burden the school system and negatively impact the quality of life in the township."

An organization of over 25 New Jersey municipalities, which claim that the doctrine causes forced building, continues to be active in 2026. Member towns include Montvale, Denville, Florham Park, Hillsdale, Mannington, Millburn, Montville, Old Tappan, Totowa, Allendale, Westwood, Hanover, Wyckoff, Wharton, Mendham, Oradell, Closter, West Amwell, Washington, Norwood, Parsippany–Troy Hills, Franklin Lakes, Cedar Grove, East Hanover, Holmdel, Wall, Little Falls, Warren, and West Caldwell.

=== Vacant properties ===
Some have argued that the deluge of abandoned and vacant properties in New Jersey should be taken into account before forced building occurs in less crowded areas.

For example, many large cities in New Jersey have drastically fewer residents than a century ago. According to the United States Census, Newark, New Jersey lost nearly 200,000 residents from the 1920s to the 2020s, whereas Camden had over 50,000 less residents in the 2020s over the 1920s. Jersey City lost almost 6,000 residents by the 2020s over the 1920s.

Atlantic City’s population peaked around 66,000 in 1930, and by 2020, it had declined to about 38,500, a loss of roughly 27,500 residents over the century.

Critics have also suggested that the state step up funding for code enforcement to reduce burdens of urban blight on attractive home development, including enforcement on absentee landlords. The City of Newark is "working with the Urban League to identify vacant or abandoned properties that can be sold to small developers to then sell at cost to residents. About 16 percent of Newark's housing is vacant and the city has a high eviction and foreclosure rate according to a Rutgers report.

In 1983, the New Jersey Supreme Court cautioned that in requiring affordable housing, the State Constitution "does not require bad planning. It does not require suburban spread. It does not require rural municipalities to encourage large scale housing developments. It does not require wasteful extension of roads and needless construction of sewer and water facilities for the out-migration of people from the cities and the suburbs. There is nothing in our Constitution that says that we cannot satisfy our constitutional obligation to provide lower income housing and, at the same time, plan the future of the state intelligently."

Dave Kaplan, of the Stop the Overdevelopment at Waterview opposition group and a Parsippany resident, stated, "I'm very frustrated that this significant tract of undeveloped land is being razed for development when so much property in Parsippany lies vacant."

=== Recent litigation ===
The Cranbury Town Committee voted unanimously on May 12, 2025 to use eminent domain to seize a 175-year-old-farm to allow the construction of affordable housing, blaming the Mount Laurel doctrine. The family is fighting the decision and enlisted the support of former Cranbury Mayor Jay Taylor.

In 2025, controversy grew in West Orange regarding the Wilf family's efforts to develop an apartment complex under the Mount Laurel doctrine on one of the last remaining forested tracts of land in Essex County, atop the second ridge of the Watchung Mountains at the Canoe Brook headwaters.

=== Sierra Club ===
The New Jersey chapter of the Sierra Club applauded Governor Chris Christie's efforts to reform affordable housing law in 2010:

The current COAH law has had a bigger impact on land use and development than any other law in New Jersey's history. The Sierra Club strongly supports a requirement for affordable housing. As towns grow, they must provide a fair share of it. But the need for affordable housing should not undermine the environmental protections given to wetlands, flood plains, steep slopes, stream buffers that protect water supplies, ocean-fronts, and endangered species habitat. And no homes should be built where water supply is at critically low levels. Furthermore, new housing should be located where jobs are, to reduce the carbon footprints and pollution associated with automobile commuting.

=== Climate Revolution Action Network ===
Ben Dziobek, the founder of Climate Revolution Action Network, a Generation Z advocacy group based in New Jersey, has criticized suburban sprawl approaches to affordable housing: “We have dilapidated and disused areas in our urban cores that would be much better served if we developed them in the right way instead of losing what land New Jersey has left."

== Support ==
Proponents say that the targeted obligations based upon an areas existing job growth, housing costs, and proximity to transit corridors are an effective way to allow people of all incomes to benefit from long term affordability. They point to the doctrine leading to the production 75,000 affordable homes and 130,000 middle class homes since inception, Since stronger enforcement began in 2015, annual production of deed-restricted affordable units nearly doubled compared to the period between 1980 and 2014 with 70,000 new units of multifamily housing and between 21,000 and 25,000 affordable units being built since 2015.

Supporters also point to the Mount Laurel Doctrine limiting the negative effects of exclusionary zoning that limits or excludes low-cost housing that people of lower incomes can afford. Single family zoning has historically been used to exclude low income people and racial minorities from neighborhoods, and areas in the United States with single family zoning in America are disproportionately white even today.This can increase inequality along race and class lines. At the same time, the increased cost of housing make it harder for both the poor and middle class afford to live in labor markets with the most opportunities for them and their children which decreases economic growth.

== Research ==
Some research suggests affordable housing development does not significantly raise local taxes and can even generate net fiscal and economic benefits. A report by the National Association of Home Builders found that building 100 units of affordable housing generates approximately $8 million in local income, over 120 jobs, and $800,000 in tax and other revenue for local governments in the first year alone. Furthermore, a 2017 study commissioned by the California Housing Partnership and Enterprise Community Partners found that affordable housing residents contribute to local economies through spending and employment and that new developments do not negatively impact property values or local tax bases.

Some towns have reconsidered their opposition to the Mount Laurel doctrine over time and have been working to speed affordable housing instead of opposing it.

An American Institute for Economic Research study claims that the doctrine is ineffective at reducing housing costs or at creating more housing. It notes that the cost of living and house price index in New Jersey has risen from 1960 to 2007 at roughly the rate of those of New York and Pennsylvania and creates a “synthetic” state by combining data from other states and comparing two theoretical model New Jerseys. A second study from the Garden State Initiative likewise compared New Jersey with Pennsylvania to find little evidence of increased supply or lower prices

== Additional history ==
=== Case ===
The plaintiffs in such suits fell into three classes: lower-income persons who actually sought housing and advocacy organizations on their behalf, the New Jersey Public Advocate, and builders who sought to construct developments containing affordable housing.

Those early exclusionary zoning suits were beset by numerous difficulties, and little, if any, affordable housing resulted. In 1983, appeals in several of these cases, of which Southern Burlington County N.A.A.C.P. v. Mount Laurel Township was again the lead case, gave the New Jersey Supreme Court the opportunity to reaffirm and tweak the Mount Laurel Doctrine and provide several mechanisms and remedies to make the doctrine more effective.

=== 1980s legislative reaction ===
The New Jersey Supreme Court was aware that the Mount Laurel II decision would be controversial andwould engender debate about the proper role of the courts. The opinion invited legislative action to implement what the court defined as the constitutional obligation.

In 1985 the New Jersey Legislature responded by passing the Fair Housing Act. Accepting the premise that there was some constitutional obligation for municipalities to foster some degree of affordable housing, this legislation created an administrative agency, the Council on Affordable Housing (COAH), to establish regulations whereby the obligation of each municipality in terms of the number of units and how the obligation could be satisfied.

A municipality that elected to participate in COAH's administrative process prior to being sued was provided with protection from litigation, especially the builder's remedy. As a transitional provision, the act provided that municipalities involved in litigation when the act was passed were to be able to transfer the litigation to COAH unless manifest injustice would result.

=== Criticism of the decision ===
While the Mount Laurel decision mandates a state constitutional obligation for every municipality in a "growth area" to provide a fair share of its region's present and prospective housing needs for low and moderate income families, there is no funding source specified for low or very-low income families in a state that already has some of the nation's highest property taxes. Some have accused the decision for being an example of judicial activism.

=== 1980s judicial response to the Fair Housing Act ===
The New Jersey Supreme Court welcomed the legislature's adoption of the Fair Housing Act. A number of trial court decisions had denied transfer of pending cases to COAH under the manifest injustice standard, but the Supreme Court read that term very narrowly and ordered the cases transferred. The trial courts were directed to conform their rulings with regard to calculation of each municipality's obligation and how to meet it to COAH's regulations and the statute was found facially constitutional and interpreted to grant COAH ample authority, such as restraining the use of scarce resources (sewer capacity, potable water, and land) for other than providing affordable housing, to assure that affordable housing might actually be built.

=== Regional Contribution Agreements (RCAs) ===
In 1985, the Fair Housing Act created the now-repealed Regional Contribution Agreement system. The RCAs meant that towns could pay to get out of up to half of their affordable housing obligation by funding affordable housing elsewhere as required by the New Jersey Supreme Court's Mt. Laurel decision.

In 2008, at the behest of the Fair Share Housing Center's Peter O' Connor and over the objections of some suburban Democrats, Governor Jon Corzine signed a law barring RCAs. A500. He signed A-500 into law during a ceremony at Fair Share Housing Development's Ethel R. Lawrence Homes. Some have demanded that RCAs be returned to cut down on sprawl.

=== January 2017 New Jersey Supreme Court decision ===
In January 2017, the New Jersey Supreme Court issued a ruling stating that towns had to consider any historic failure to provide affordable housing. As one commentator put it,

This case resolved affordable housing regulation debates that have been ongoing since 1999. However, the Court provided no guidance on the method of implementation of affordable housing accommodations that it now requires of municipalities. This decision leaves numerous unanswered questions and it will depend heavily on the Legislature to issue reform of affordable housing requirements. This decision requires implementation of affordable housing accommodations into township plans that have not otherwise considered them since 1999. It is likely that the open spaces in towns will now be filled with affordable housing units, which will bring an influx of population to municipalities.... We will need to watch the Legislature to see how and if it will alter the current affordable housing regulations to comply with the Court's recent ruling.

In its January 2017 opinion, the New Jersey Supreme Court welcomed the legislature to reapproach the affordable housing issue. "We recognize, as we have before, that the Legislature is not foreclosed from considering alternative methods for calculating and assigning a municipal fair share of affordable housing, and to that end, we welcome legislative attention to this important social and economic constitutional matter," Justice LaVecchia wrote.

== See also ==
- Abbott district, a similarly controversial legal doctrine resulting from a series of New Jersey Supreme Court cases holding that the education of children in poor communities was unconstitutionally inadequate
- Frederick Wilson Hall, who wrote the initial decision
- Latino Action Network v. New Jersey, a lawsuit filed in 2018 to desegregate the public schools
