= Ramblewood, New Jersey =

Populated place in Burlington County, New Jersey, US

- Census-designated place
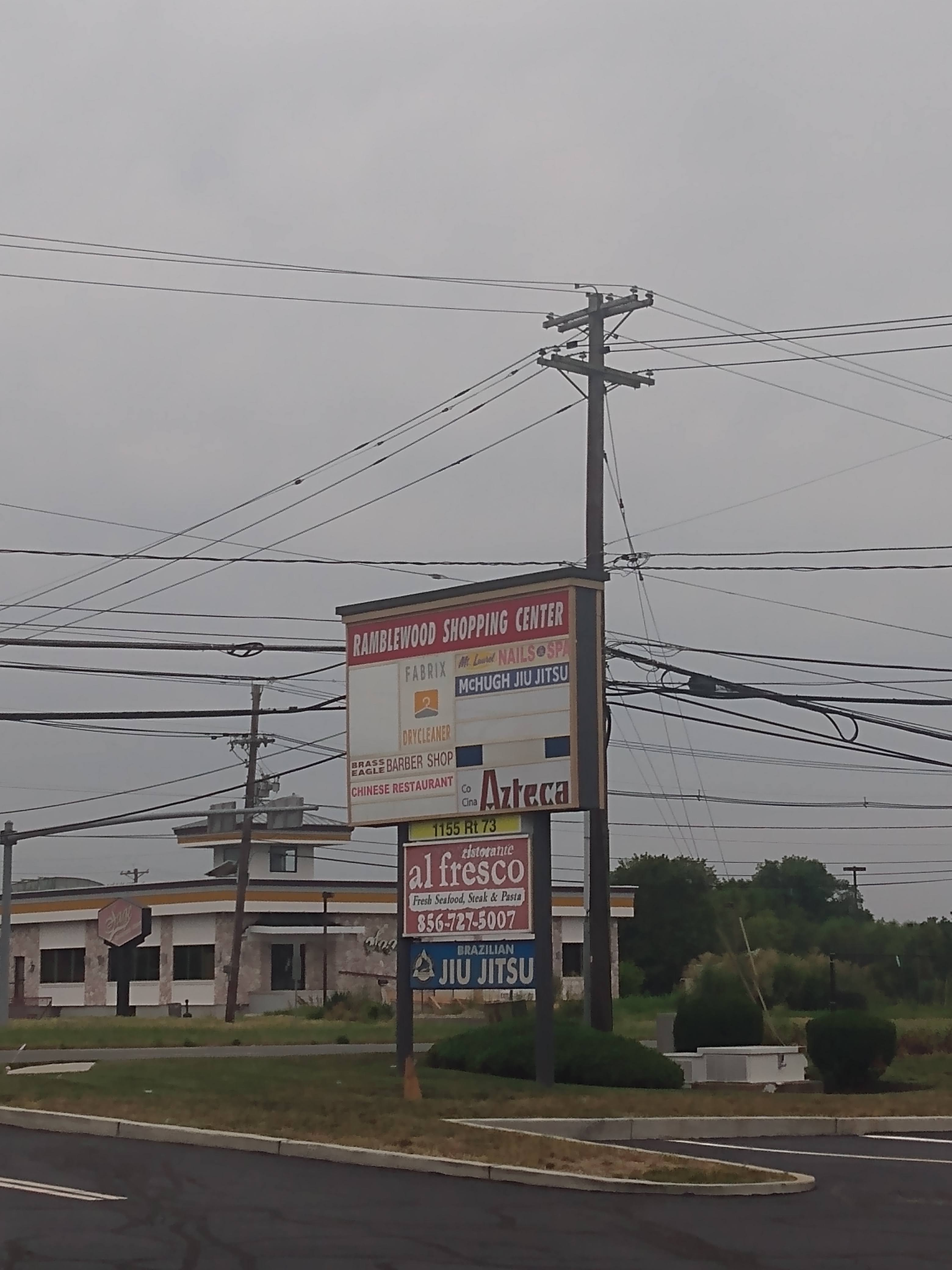

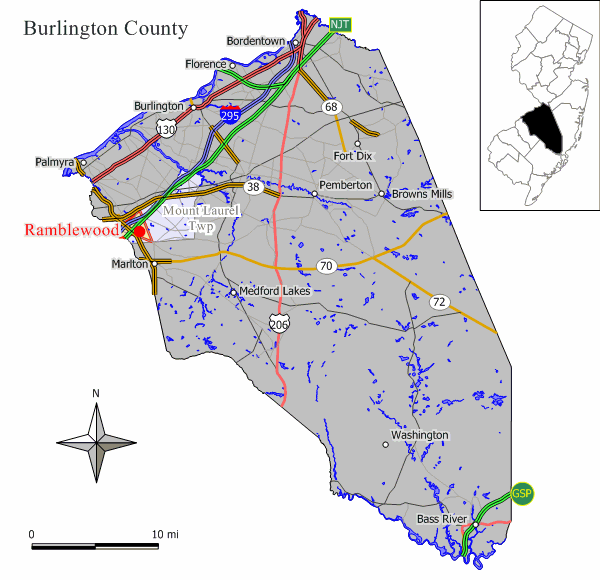
- Location of Ramblewood in Burlington County highlighted in red (left). Inset map: Location of Burlington County in New Jersey highlighted in black (right).

- Location in Burlington County Location in New Jersey Location in the United States
- Coordinates: 39.932053°N 74.952749°W
- Country: United States
- State: New Jersey
- County: Burlington
- Township: Mount Laurel

Area
  - Total: 3.41 sq mi (8.82 km^{2})
  - Land: 3.39 sq mi (8.78 km^{2})
  - Water: 0.015 sq mi (0.04 km^{2}) 0.42%
- Elevation: 30 ft (9 m)

Population (2020)
  - Total: 6,655
  - Density: 1,962.5/sq mi (757.7/km^{2})
- Time zone: UTC−05:00 (Eastern (EST))
  - Summer (DST): UTC−04:00 (Eastern (EDT))
- Area code: 856
- FIPS code: 34-61650
- GNIS feature ID: 02389722

Ramblewood is an unincorporated community and census-designated place (CDP) located within Mount Laurel in Burlington County, in the U.S. state of New Jersey. As of the 2020 census, Ramblewood had a population of 6,655.

== Geography ==
According to the United States Census Bureau, the CDP had a total area of 3.386 square miles (8.77 km^{2}), including 3.372 square miles (8.73 km^{2}) of land and 0.014 square miles (0.036 km^{2}) of water (0.42%).

== Demographics ==
Historical population
Census	Pop.	Note	%±
1970	5,558		—
1980	6,475		16.5%
1990	6,181		−4.5%
2000	6,003		−2.9%
2010	5,907		−1.6%
2020	6,655		12.7%
Population sources: 1970-1980; 1950 1960 1970; 1980 1990 2000; 2010 2020

Ramblewood first appeared as an unincorporated community in the 1970 U.S. census; and then was listed as a census designated place in the 1980 U.S. census.

=== Racial and ethnic composition ===
Ramblewood CDP, New Jersey – Racial and ethnic composition Note: the US Census treats Hispanic/Latino as an ethnic category. This table excludes Latinos from the racial categories and assigns them to a separate category. Hispanics/Latinos may be of any race.
Race / Ethnicity (NH = Non-Hispanic)	Pop 2000	Pop 2010	Pop 2020	% 2000	% 2010	% 2020
White alone (NH)	5,341	4,763	4,827	88.97%	80.63%	72.53%
Black or African American alone (NH)	282	428	566	4.70%	7.25%	8.50%
Native American or Alaska Native alone (NH)	3	9	5	0.05%	0.15%	0.08%
Asian alone (NH)	209	359	517	3.48%	6.08%	7.77%
Native Hawaiian or Pacific Islander alone (NH)	0	1	2	0.00%	0.02%	0.03%
Other race alone (NH)	8	6	32	0.13%	0.10%	0.48%
Mixed race or Multiracial (NH)	38	95	237	0.63%	1.61%	3.56%
Hispanic or Latino (any race)	122	246	469	2.03%	4.16%	7.05%
Total	6,003	5,907	6,655	100.00%	100.00%	100.00%

=== 2020 census ===
As of the 2020 census, Ramblewood had a population of 6,655. The median age was 44.1 years. 19.5% of residents were under the age of 18, and 20.4% were 65 years of age or older. For every 100 females, there were 98.4 males, and for every 100 females age 18 and older, there were 96.0 males.

100.0% of residents lived in urban areas, while 0.0% lived in rural areas.

There were 2,575 households, of which 28.4% had children under the age of 18 living in them. Of all households, 54.1% were married-couple households, 16.7% were households with a male householder and no spouse or partner present, and 24.3% were households with a female householder and no spouse or partner present. About 26.7% of all households were made up of individuals, and 10.8% had someone living alone who was 65 years of age or older.

There were 2,718 housing units, of which 5.3% were vacant. The homeowner vacancy rate was 1.7% and the rental vacancy rate was 6.1%.

=== 2010 census ===
The 2010 United States census counted 5,907 people, 2,246 households, and 1,532 families in the CDP. The population density was 1,752.0 people per square mile (676.5 people/km^{2}). There were 2,388 housing units at an average density of 708.3 units per square mile (273.5 units/km^{2}). The racial makeup was 83.38% (4,925) White, 7.64% (451) Black or African American, 0.17% (10) Native American, 6.08% (359) Asian, 0.02% (1) Pacific Islander, 0.81% (48) from other races, and 1.91% (113) from two or more races. Hispanic or Latino of any race were 4.16% (246) of the population.

Of the 2,246 households, 30.8% had children under the age of 18; 55.9% were married couples living together; 8.8% had a female householder with no husband present and 31.8% were non-families. Of all households, 25.5% were made up of individuals and 7.9% had someone living alone who was 65 years of age or older. The average household size was 2.57 and the average family size was 3.14.

22.3% of the population were under the age of 18, 7.5% from 18 to 24, 27.0% from 25 to 44, 27.6% from 45 to 64, and 15.5% who were 65 years of age or older. The median age was 40.8 years. For every 100 females, the population had 97.0 males. For every 100 females ages 18 and older there were 93.1 males.

=== 2000 census ===
As of the 2000 United States census there were 6,003 people, 2,306 households, and 1,568 families living in the CDP. The population density was 683.7 people/km^{2} (1,771 people/mi^{2}). There were 2,379 housing units at an average density of 271.0 units/km^{2} (702 units/mi^{2}). The racial makeup of the CDP was 90.05% White, 4.78% African American, 0.05% Native American, 3.48% Asian, 0.48% from other races, and 1.15% from two or more races. Hispanic or Latino of any race were 2.03% of the population.

There were 2,306 households, out of which 29.6% had children under the age of 18 living with them, 58.6% were married couples living together, 7.1% had a female householder with no husband present, and 32.0% were non-families. 26.5% of all households were made up of individuals, and 6.7% had someone living alone who was 65 years of age or older. The average household size was 2.51 and the average family size was 3.10.

In the CDP the population was spread out, with 22.0% under the age of 18, 5.7% from 18 to 24, 30.4% from 25 to 44, 26.1% from 45 to 64, and 15.9% who were 65 years of age or older. The median age was 40 years. For every 100 females, there were 93.5 males. For every 100 females age 18 and over, there were 91.8 males.

The median income for a household in the CDP was $71,230, and the median income for a family was $76,519. Males had a median income of $57,152 versus $36,436 for females. The per capita income for the CDP was $30,308. About 1.1% of families and 1.7% of the population were below the poverty line, including 2.8% of those under age 18 and none of those age 65 or over.

== Education ==
Its school districts are Mount Laurel Township School District (elementary and middle school) and Lenape Regional School District (high school). All residents of Mount Laurel Township are zoned to Lenape High School. Additionally, the small school program at Seneca High School accepts Mount Laurel Township residents.
