= Anne Rosenberg =

American surgical oncologist

- Born: Philadelphia, Pennsylvania
- Education: Goucher College (B.A.); Thomas Jefferson University (M.D.)
- Years active: 1981-2015
- Title: Oncologist

Anne Louise Rosenberg is an American surgical oncologist retired from practice in Cherry Hill, New Jersey.

== Career ==
Rosenberg's career in medicine began in 1981, after graduating from Goucher College in Towson, Maryland and then attending medical school at Thomas Jefferson University, graduating with honors. She then completed surgical training at Thomas Jefferson University Hospital. She is board certified in Surgery by the American Board of Surgery.

Rosenberg is a clinical professor in surgery at Jefferson Medical College and was named Top Doctor by Philadelphia Magazine, SJ Magazine, and South Jersey Magazine along with being featured in “A Day in the Life of the American Woman”. Rosenberg has been published in numerous publications and scholarly journals including South Jersey Senior Magazine, Journal of Ultrasound in Medicine, The American Journal of Surgery, International Seminars in Surgical Oncology, and Korean Nuclear Medicine Journal.

== Research ==
=== Detection of breast cancer ===
In the early 1980s, Rosenberg's early clinical research efforts were focused on validating the use of mammographic location of non-palpable breast lesions. Previously, there was no directed biopsy method for these abnormalities. These studies allowed histologic and radiographic findings to be correlated, and this laid the foundation for the development of the BIRADS classification for mammographic findings.

Rosenberg, along with ultrasonographers, developed techniques for pre- and intraoperative ultrasound lesion localization with post excision evaluation of the tumor bed for confirmation of excision. These techniques were nearly 100% accurate with adequate lesion removal. This work added ultrasound localization to the biopsy and lumpectomy procedures.

=== Surgical treatment of breast cancer ===
Based on the use of radiographic localization and acceptance of breast conservation therapy for breast cancer, Gordon Schwartz and Rosenberg described the management of the early-stage breast cancers, focusing on breast conservation. They also reported on the experience with lumpectomy, level 1 axillary node dissection followed by breast radiation (breast conservation) for the treatment of operable breast cancer (stage 1 and 2 disease). This work validated the effectiveness of breast conservation as an equivalent to mastectomy with regard to distant disease and local control and substantiated the need for radiation therapy and complete excision of the primary and established the acceptance of breast conservation therapy for breast cancer.

Elderly women with breast cancer were reviewed and, although it was standard of care to perform mastectomy, Rosenberg's work, along with others at Jefferson University Hospital, confirmed that elderly women could be effectively treated with breast conservation and should be offered all surgical options, as the new standard of care.

Introduction of neo-adjuvant chemotherapy also changes the standard of care for a more advanced stage, but localized breast cancers as 80% of women had a response to chemotherapy. The studies helped establish the length of neo-adjuvant chemotherapy needed and the increase in survival and disease-free survival when compared to women who did not receive neo-adjuvant chemotherapy. Disease-free survival improved three to four-fold and neo-adjuvant became the standard of care for a patient with larger tumors and nodal disease but no distant metastases.

In collaboration with Carl Mansfield, she reported on ten-year experience with interstitial implants in the breast to deliver the boost dose. This work changed the delivery of breast radiation by showing the complications from excessive boost radiation and also the reduced tumor recurrence when radiation was used. Interstitial implants were effective as method to deliver boost and offered an abbreviated time frame to do so.

In 1995, What to do if you get breast cancer was co-authored by Rosenberg with Marion Betancourt and Lydia Komarnicky, which promoted a new approach to disseminating information about diagnosis and management to patients.

As a member of a cooperative group to validate the use of sentinel node biopsy for staging breast cancer, Dr. Rosenberg contributed to the study which changed the surgical management of the axilla for staging and treatment of breast cancer.

In 2006, Rosenberg reported on and discussed the management of women with a history of breast augmentation who developed breast cancer. The conclusions were that treatment was to be individualized based upon the breast size and tumor location but both breast conservation and mastectomy were associated with similar survival, disease-free interval, and local recurrence. Breast conservation was a viable option to be offered to these women.

Rosenberg popularized the use of brachytherapy devices (SAVI, mammosite) for local breast radiation for favorable breast cancers and she taught other surgeons the technique.

=== Molecular studies ===
Beginning in the mid-1990s, Rosenberg began to collect blood and surgical specimens of normal breast tissue, benign tumors, and malignant tumors. Evaluation of this tissue led to several observations that were important in understanding the biological behavior of malignancies. Croce and Rosenberg reported there was a loss of heterozygosity at 11q22-q23 in breast tumors.

Collaborations with Croce were focused on microRNA expression and allowed the patterns of expression to be identified for target genes for tumors and by profiling the expression. These reproducible patterns of microRNA expression allowed for target tumor gene profiling, including male breast cancer.

In collaboration with Hallguir Rui, they were the first to isolate a prolactin receptor-associated tyrosine kinase, and to identify this molecule as Janus kinase-2. These human tissue lines in a prolactin deficient mouse model allowed the definition of signal transduction by cytokine receptors and hormones with a primary goal of understanding the role of downstream JAK-STAT pathways and their aberrations in breast cancer. Together, they also demonstrated that the loss of STAT5 in estrogen-receptor-positive breast cancer is associated with increased risk of antiestrogen resistance and laid the groundwork for the patented matrix assembly technology for generation of high-density tumor tissue arrays for high-through-put molecular profiling.

== Personal life ==
Rosenberg also has a working horse farm on 50 acres (20 ha) in Mount Laurel, New Jersey. and is involved in women's initiatives and breast cancer awareness, clinical research trials, as well as numerous scientific presentations. She is also active with the Alliance of Therapy Dogs, American Kennel club Club and Crisis Response Canines.

She was recognized with a Community Service Award by the 101 Women Plus organization.
