= Susan Bass Levin =

American politician

Susan Bass Levin is the current President and CEO of Cooper University Health System's Cooper Foundation. Levin is a Democratic Party politician in New Jersey, and previously served as First Deputy Executive Director of the Port Authority of New York and New Jersey (PANY/NJ). She also ran for a House seat in 2000. Levin also was Commissioner of the New Jersey Department of Community Affairs (DCA), serving in the cabinets of Governors Jim McGreevey, Dick Codey, and Jon Corzine beginning in 2002. From 1988 to 2002, Bass Levin was Mayor of the Township of Cherry Hill, New Jersey.

== Life and career ==
Susan Bass Levin is a graduate of the University of Rochester and the George Washington University Law School. She is Jewish.

In December 1996, while Mayor of Cherry Hill, Bass Levin was a member of the New Jersey State Electoral College, one of 15 electors casting their votes for the Clinton/Gore ticket.

A Democrat, she unsuccessfully challenged longtime U.S. Representative H. James Saxton in the 2000 election in which she garnered 42% of the popular vote in New Jersey's 3rd congressional district. Saxton retired his seat in 2009, and Bass Levin's friend, neighbor, and former Cherry Hill Councilman/State Senator John Adler was elected to the House post.

On May 21, 2007, New Jersey Governor Jon S. Corzine named Bass Levin as First Deputy Executive Director of the Port Authority of New York and New Jersey.

In June 2007, Corzine also named Bass Levin to a five-year term on the New Jersey Local Finance Board. The Local Finance Board oversees the finances of local governments in New Jersey and debt financing issues for local government.

Preceded by Jane Kenny	Commissioner of the New Jersey Department of Community Affairs; January 2002 – July 2005	Succeeded by Charles Richman
Preceded by Charles Richman	Commissioner of the New Jersey Department of Community Affairs; January 2006 – July 2007	Succeeded by Joseph Doria
Preceded by Jamie Fox	Deputy Executive Director of the Port Authority of New York and New Jersey; July 2007 –	Succeeded by Incumbent
