= Sheila Oliver =

American politician (1952–2023)

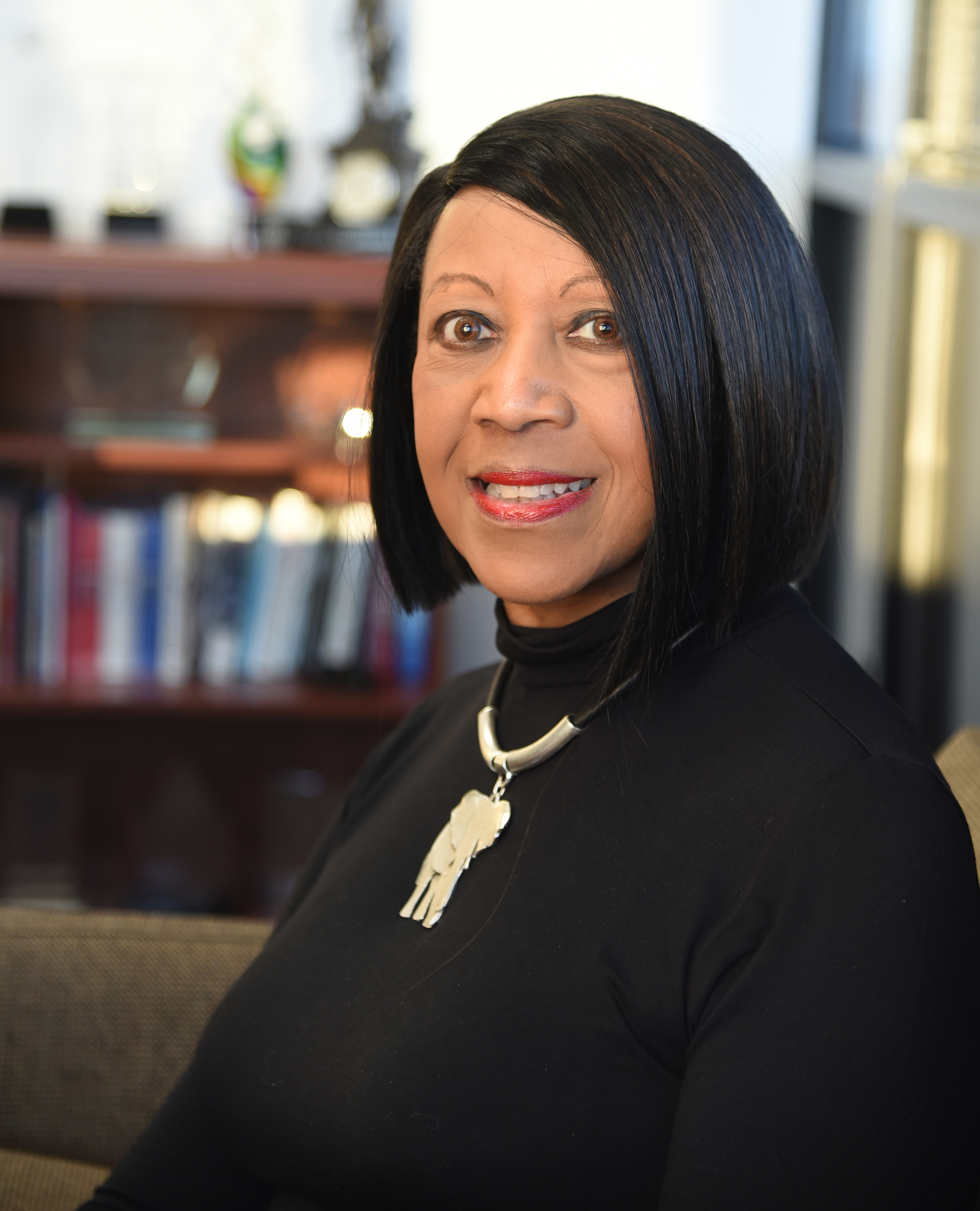
- Official portrait, 2020

2nd Lieutenant Governor of New Jersey
- In office January 16, 2018 – August 1, 2023
- Governor: Phil Murphy
- Preceded by: Kim Guadagno
- Succeeded by: Tahesha Way

Commissioner of the New Jersey Department of Community Affairs
- In office January 16, 2018 – August 1, 2023
- Governor: Phil Murphy
- Preceded by: Charles Richman
- Succeeded by: Jacquelyn Suárez

169th Speaker of the New Jersey General Assembly
- In office January 12, 2010 – January 14, 2014
- Preceded by: Joseph J. Roberts
- Succeeded by: Vincent Prieto

Member of the New Jersey General Assembly from the 34th district
- In office January 13, 2004 – January 9, 2018
- Preceded by: Willis Edwards
- Succeeded by: Britnee Timberlake

Personal details
- Born: Sheila Yvette Oliver; July 14, 1952 Newark, New Jersey, U.S.
- Died: August 1, 2023 (aged 71) Livingston, New Jersey, U.S.
- Party: Democratic
- Education: Lincoln University (BA); Columbia University (MSW)

Sheila Yvette Oliver (July 14, 1952 – August 1, 2023) was an American politician who served as the second lieutenant governor of New Jersey from 2018 until her death in 2023. A member of the Democratic Party, Oliver was the first Black woman to serve as lieutenant governor of New Jersey and was the first woman of color elected to statewide office in New Jersey.

In the 1990s, Oliver served on the Board of Education of the East Orange School District, ultimately serving as the district's president. Oliver represented the 34th legislative district in the New Jersey General Assembly from 2004 to 2018, serving as speaker of the body from 2010 to 2014. Oliver was the first Black woman to serve as speaker of the General Assembly and the second Black woman in the history of the United States to lead a state legislative body. She ran for U.S. Senate in a 2013 special election, finishing fourth in a Democratic primary that was won by Cory Booker.

In the 2017 New Jersey gubernatorial election, Oliver was chosen as the running mate of Democrat Phil Murphy. After the Murphy/Oliver ticket won the election, Oliver was sworn in as lieutenant governor on January 16, 2018. During her tenure as lieutenant governor, Oliver also served as the Commissioner of the New Jersey Department of Community Affairs. Murphy and Oliver were re-elected to their respective posts in 2021. On July 31, 2023, Oliver suffered a medical event; she died the following day.

== Early life and education ==
Sheila Yvette Oliver was born in Newark, New Jersey on July 14, 1952. Raised in Newark, she graduated from Weequahic High School in 1970.

Oliver graduated cum laude with a B.A. in sociology from Lincoln University in 1974 and was awarded an MSW from Columbia University in community organization, planning and administration in 1976.

On May 6, 2018, Oliver received the honorary degree of Doctor of Humane Letters from Lincoln University.

== Early career ==
Oliver worked in both the public and private sectors. She was the executive director of The Leaguers, Inc., a northern New Jersey non-profit social services organization. Oliver also taught at the college level, serving as an adjunct faculty member at Essex County College and Caldwell University.

Oliver served on the Board of Education of the East Orange School District from 1994 to 2000, and was chosen by her peers to serve as its vice president from 1998 to 1999 and as its president from 1999 to 2000. She served on the Essex County Board of Chosen Freeholders from the 3rd district for one term from 1996 to 1999, but was defeated for a second term on the board in the June 1999 Democratic primary election. In 1997, Oliver ran for mayor of the City of East Orange, narrowly losing the Democratic primary election to Robert L. Bowser.

== New Jersey State Assembly (2004–2018) ==
As a part of intra-party deal making in 2003, Oliver and incumbent Assemblyman Peter C. Eagler were chosen to be the party-backed candidates in the June 2003 primary election for General Assembly from the 34th district. Incumbent Assemblyman Willis Edwards was dropped from the ticket as a result, and Oliver and Eagler won their Democratic primary.

Prior to her initial run for lieutenant governor, Oliver was re-elected to the Assembly six consecutive times following her first election victory in 2003.

=== Tenure as Speaker (2010–2014) ===
On November 23, 2009, Oliver was elected unanimously by Assembly Democrats to become the 169th Speaker of the Assembly. Her election made her the first Black woman to serve as speaker of the New Jersey General Assembly, the second woman in New Jersey history to serve as Assembly speaker (the first being Marion West Higgins, who served in 1965), and the second African American to hold the post (the first being S. Howard Woodson, who first held the post in 1974). Nationwide, she became the second African American woman to lead a state legislature (Karen Bass of California is the first).

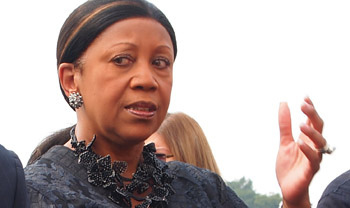
Oliver as Speaker of the Assembly in 2011

As Speaker, Oliver backed Governor Chris Christie's reforms to public workers' pensions and benefits. Police and fire unions were furious with the Speaker, claiming that she told them the issue was still under consideration before announcing the bill would be introduced later that same day. Then-Assemblyman Joseph Cryan was unsuccessful in his efforts to convince his fellow Democrats to stage a coup against reappointing Oliver as Speaker. Oliver was elected in 2011 for a second term as Speaker under the terms of a deal made with Senator Nicholas Sacco, Essex County Executive Joseph N. DiVincenzo Jr., and South Jersey political boss George Norcross in which she agreed to move legislation forward only with the advance support of 41 Assembly Democrats.

Oliver served in the Assembly on the Commerce and Economic Development Committee, the Transportation and Independent Authorities Committee, the Joint Committee on Economic Justice and Equal Employment Opportunity, and the Joint Committee on the Public Schools. In November 2013, Assembly Democrats chose Vincent Prieto to succeed Oliver as speaker, which he did in January 2014. In the 2014–2015 Assembly term, Oliver was designated speaker emeritus of the Assembly.

== 2013 U.S. Senate special election ==
On June 10, 2013, Oliver formally announced that she would run in the special election for the United States Senate seat which had been previously held by Frank Lautenberg before he died. As a candidate, she advocated for immigration reform and for federal investment in industrial areas. In the August 13 special Democratic primary, Cory Booker prevailed; Oliver came in fourth place out of four candidates, winning four percent of the vote.

== Lieutenant governor of New Jersey (2018–2023) ==
=== 2017 election ===
In July 2017, Democratic gubernatorial nominee Phil Murphy announced that he had chosen Oliver as his running mate in the 2017 election for governor of New Jersey. (Note: In New Jersey, within 30 days after the certification of the statewide primary election, the candidate for governor selects a running mate to join the ticket as the candidate for lieutenant governor. The governor and lieutenant governor must be members of the same political party. As candidates they campaign on the same ticket, are elected conjointly, and serve the same four-year term concurrently.) Murphy and Oliver defeated the Republican ticket of Lieutenant Governor Kim Guadagno and Mayor Carlos Rendo of Woodcliff Lake. Murphy announced he would also appoint Oliver to serve as commissioner of the Department of Community Affairs, a cabinet position, made under a provision of the New Jersey Constitution that allows the governor to appoint his lieutenant governor to a cabinet post without requiring the approval of the New Jersey Senate.

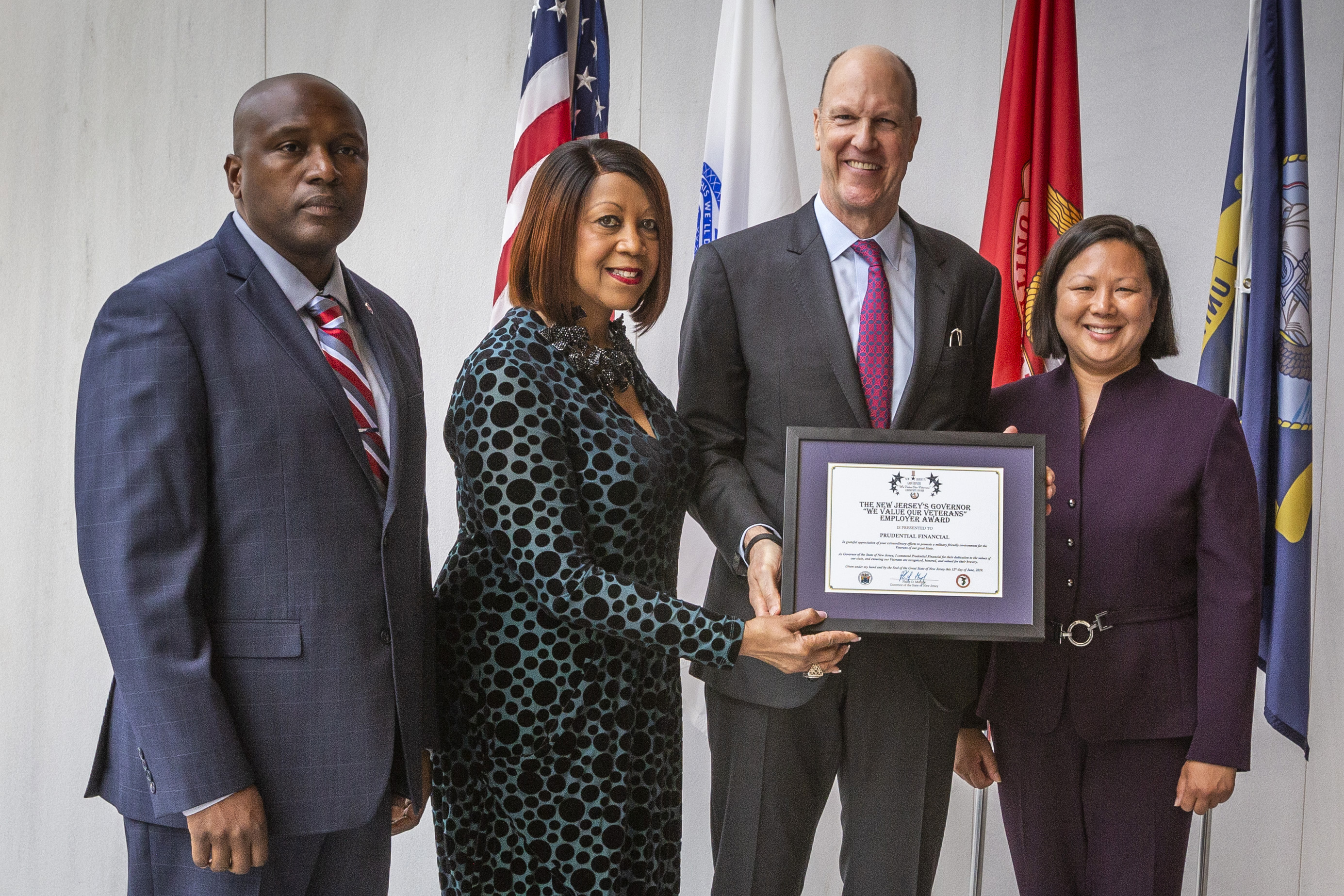
Oliver as lieutenant governor, presenting an award to Charles F. Lowery in 2019

New Jersey law allows a candidate to run for two elective offices simultaneously, but does not allow one person to hold two offices simultaneously. Oliver, in addition to being elected Lieutenant Governor of New Jersey, also won re-election to her legislative seat in the General Assembly in 2017. When Carlos Rendo, during their one televised debate, challenged her decision to run for both seats, Oliver had said that she had filed to run for re-election before she was chosen by Murphy as his running mate and would resign from her Assembly seat if she and Murphy were elected. Oliver resigned her Assembly seat on January 9, 2018 and was succeeded by Britnee Timberlake.

=== Tenure and reelection ===
Oliver was sworn in as lieutenant governor on January 16, 2018. She was the second lieutenant governor in the history of the state. Oliver was also the first black woman to serve as lieutenant governor of New Jersey and the first woman of color elected to statewide office in New Jersey. Oliver served as the Commissioner of the New Jersey Department of Community Affairs during her tenure as lieutenant governor.

As commissioner, Oliver focused on policies that supported housing programs and municipal government services, while also providing support to revitalization projects. During her time as acting governor, Oliver signed legislation related to several areas, including aid for caregivers of the elderly and disabled, financial literacy education in schools, wage protections, and restorative juvenile justice.

In 2021, Oliver ran for re-election to the post of lieutenant governor as Murphy's running mate. She debated Diane Allen, the Republican candidate for lieutenant governor, on October 5, 2021. On November 2, 2021, Murphy and Oliver were re-elected, defeating the Republican ticket of Jack Ciattarelli and Diane Allen by a 51%–48% margin. Prior to her death, Oliver was viewed as a potential candidate to succeed Murphy as governor in the 2025 election.

== Personal life and death ==
Oliver never married and had no children. She was once engaged to be married, but she ended the relationship. In 2019, she said, "'I cannot imagine doing what I've done in my professional career and raising a family'".

On July 28, 2023, Oliver assumed the role of acting governor while Governor Murphy was out of state on vacation in Italy. However, on July 31, she suffered a medical event and was hospitalized at Cooperman Barnabas Medical Center in Livingston. Oliver died the following day, August 1, 2023, at age 71. No cause of death was made public.

Following Oliver's death, The New Jersey Monitor reported that her "fragile health" had been "an open secret in New Jersey political circles", but added that she "was private about her struggles".

=== Tributes ===
Following Oliver's death, Murphy returned to New Jersey early before ordering flags at state facilities to fly at half-staff for one month, through September 4, as a sign of respect. Murphy's office also announced that Oliver would lie in state in the rotunda of the New Jersey State House and in the Essex County Historic Courthouse in the days preceding her public funeral at the Cathedral Basilica of the Sacred Heart on August 12.

A number of Democratic and Republican politicians paid tribute to Oliver, with Representative Frank Pallone describing her as a "trailblazer in every sense of the word" who "always fought for what was right". In a statement, Governor Murphy said that Oliver was "the ideal partner" to help him lead New Jersey; he added that selecting Oliver as a running mate was the best decision he had ever made.

Oliver was inducted into the New Jersey Hall of Fame in 2025.

== Electoral history ==
=== New Jersey Governor ===
2021 New Jersey gubernatorial election
| Party | Candidate | Votes | % | ±% |
|---|---|---|---|---|
| Democratic | Phil Murphy (incumbent)/Sheila Oliver (incumbent) | 1,339,471 | 51.22% | |
| Republican | Jack Ciattarelli/Diane Allen | 1,255,185 | 48.00 | |
| Green | Madelyn R. Hoffman | 8,450 | 0.32 | |
| Libertarian | Gregg Mele | 7,768 | 0.30 | |
| Socialist Workers | Joanne Kuniansky | 4,012 | 0.15 | |
| Total votes | | 2,614,886 | 100.00% | N/A |

2017 New Jersey gubernatorial election
| Party | Candidate | Votes | % | ±% |
|---|---|---|---|---|
| Democratic | Phil Murphy/Sheila Oliver | 1,203,110 | 56.03% | +17.84% |
| Republican | Kim Guadagno/Carlos Rendo | 899,583 | 41.89% | −18.41% |
| Independent | Gina Genovese | 12,294 | 0.57% | N/A |
| Libertarian | Peter J. Rohrman | 10,531 | 0.49% | −0.08% |
| Green | Seth Kaper-Dale | 10,053 | 0.47% | +0.08% |
| Constitution | Matthew Riccardi | 6,864 | 0.32% | N/A |
| Independent | Vincent Ross | 4,980 | 0.29% | N/A |
| Total votes | | 2,147,415 | 100.00% | N/A |
| Democratic gain from Republican | | | | |

=== New Jersey General Assembly ===
34th Legislative District general election, 2007
| Party | Candidate | Votes | % |
|---|---|---|---|
| Democratic | Thomas P. Giblin (incumbent) | 15,198 | 35.68 |
| Democratic | Sheila Oliver (incumbent) | 14,755 | 34.64 |
| Republican | Robert C. Bianco | 6,432 | 15.1 |
| Republican | Clenard H. Childress | 6,210 | 14.58 |
| Total votes | | 42,595 | 100 |

==== Democratic Primaries ====
34th Legislative District democratic primaries, 2005
| Candidate | Votes | % |
|---|---|---|
| Sheila Oliver (incumbent) | 8,303 | 43.93 |
| Thomas P. Giblin | 7,644 | 40.44 |
| Debbie Ellison | 1,122 | 5.94 |
| Vashti Johnson | 974 | 5.15 |
| Clenard H. Childress Jr | 857 | 4.53 |
| Total votes | 18,900 | 99.99 |

== See also ==
- List of female lieutenant governors in the United States
- List of female speakers of legislatures in the United States
- List of minority governors and lieutenant governors in the United States

== Notes ==
Party political offices
| Preceded by Milly Silva | Democratic nominee for Lieutenant Governor of New Jersey; 2017, 2021 | Succeeded by Dale Caldwell |
Political offices
| Preceded by Joseph Roberts | Speaker of the New Jersey General Assembly; 2010–2014 | Succeeded by Vincent Prieto |
| Preceded by Kim Guadagno | Lieutenant Governor of New Jersey; 2018–2023 | Succeeded by Tahesha Way |
