= Evesham Friends Meeting House =

Historic meetinghouse in New Jersey, United States

- U.S. National Register of Historic Places
- New Jersey Register of Historic Places
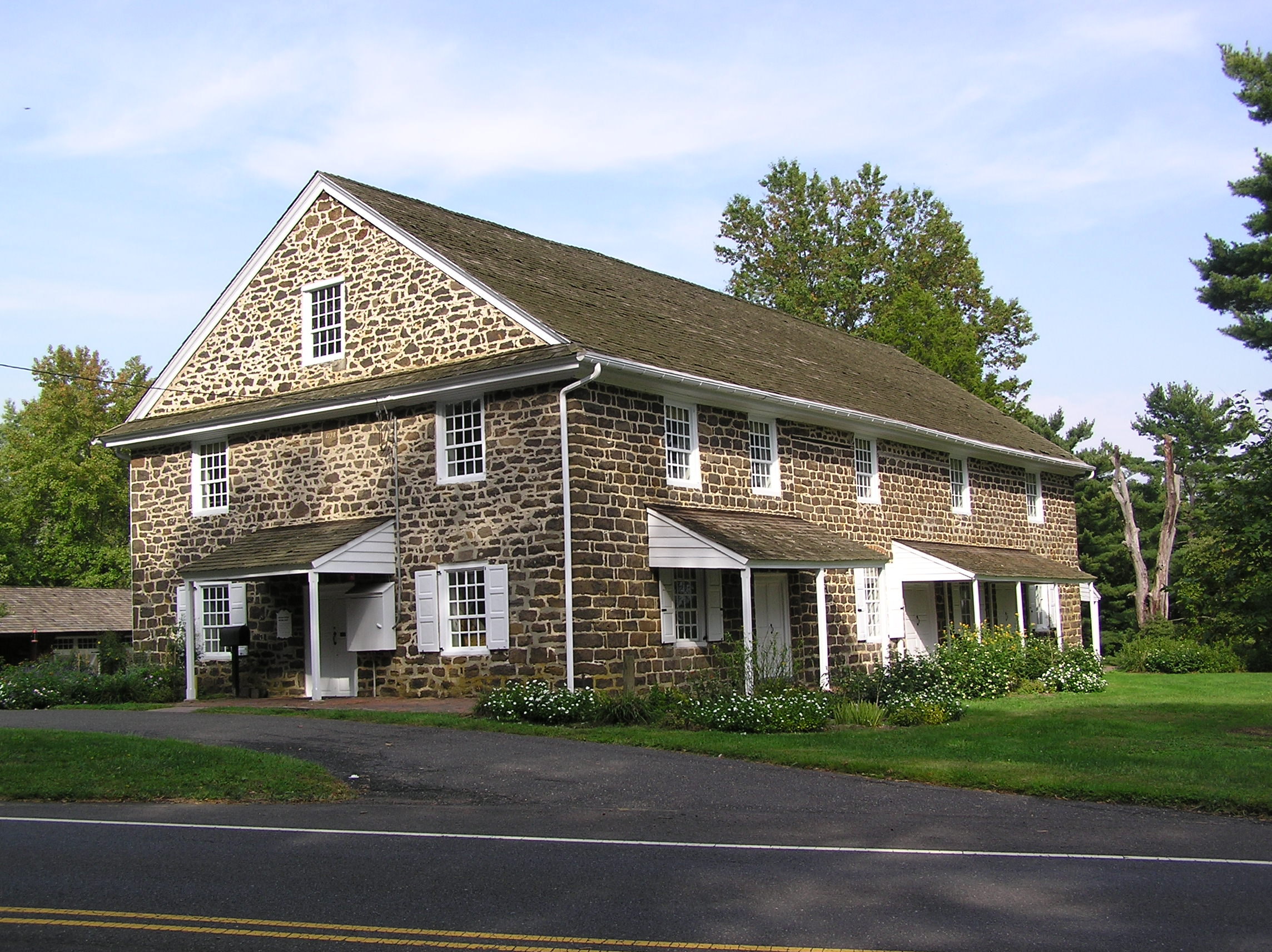

- Location within Burlington County, New Jersey Location within New Jersey Location within the United States
- Location: Moorestown-Mt. Laurel and Hainesport-Mt. Laurel Roads. (Evesboro Road), Mount Laurel Township, New Jersey
- Coordinates: 39°56′5″N 74°53′32″W
- Area: 3.9 acres (1.6 ha)
- Built: 1760
- Architectural style: Quaker architecture
- NRHP reference No.: 82003268
- NJRHP No.: 849

Significant dates
- Added to NRHP: April 22, 1982
- Designated NJRHP: April 21, 1981

The Evesham Friends Meeting House, also known as the Mount Laurel Meeting House, is a historic Quaker meeting house located at Moorestown-Mt. Laurel and Hainesport-Mt. Laurel Roads (Evesboro Road) in the township of Mount Laurel in Burlington County, New Jersey, United States. It was added to the National Register of Historic Places on April 22, 1982, for its significance in architecture, military history, and religion.

The meeting house was built in 1760 from local sandstone and expanded in 1798. It is the second oldest extent Quaker meeting house in Burlington County. The original meeting house on the site was built in 1698 behind the current building. A movable partition divides the older, eastern section from the newer section. During the Orthodox-Hicksite split, adherents of the Orthodox view met in the older section, while the Hicksites met in the newer section.

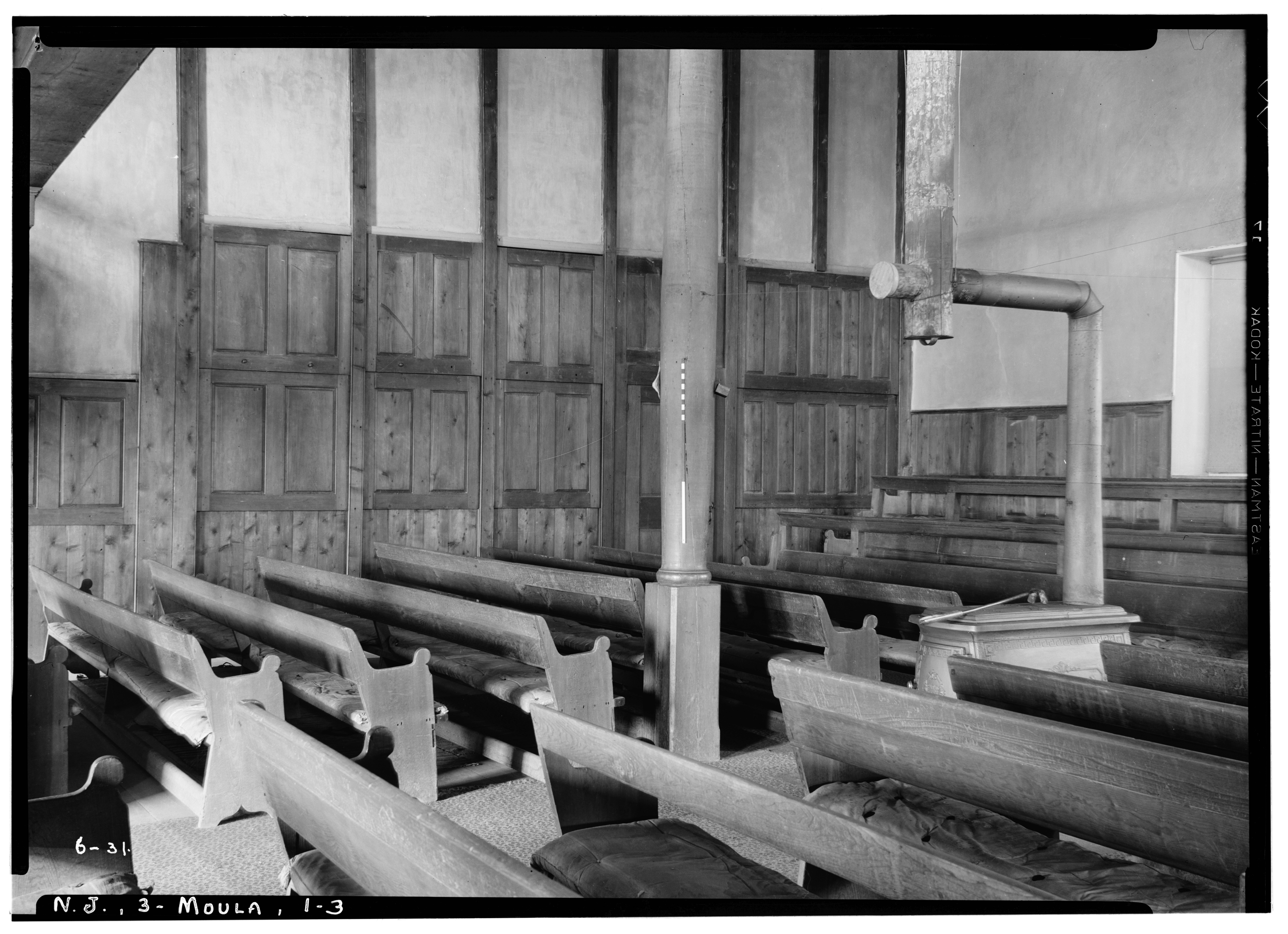
Interior of older section in 1936

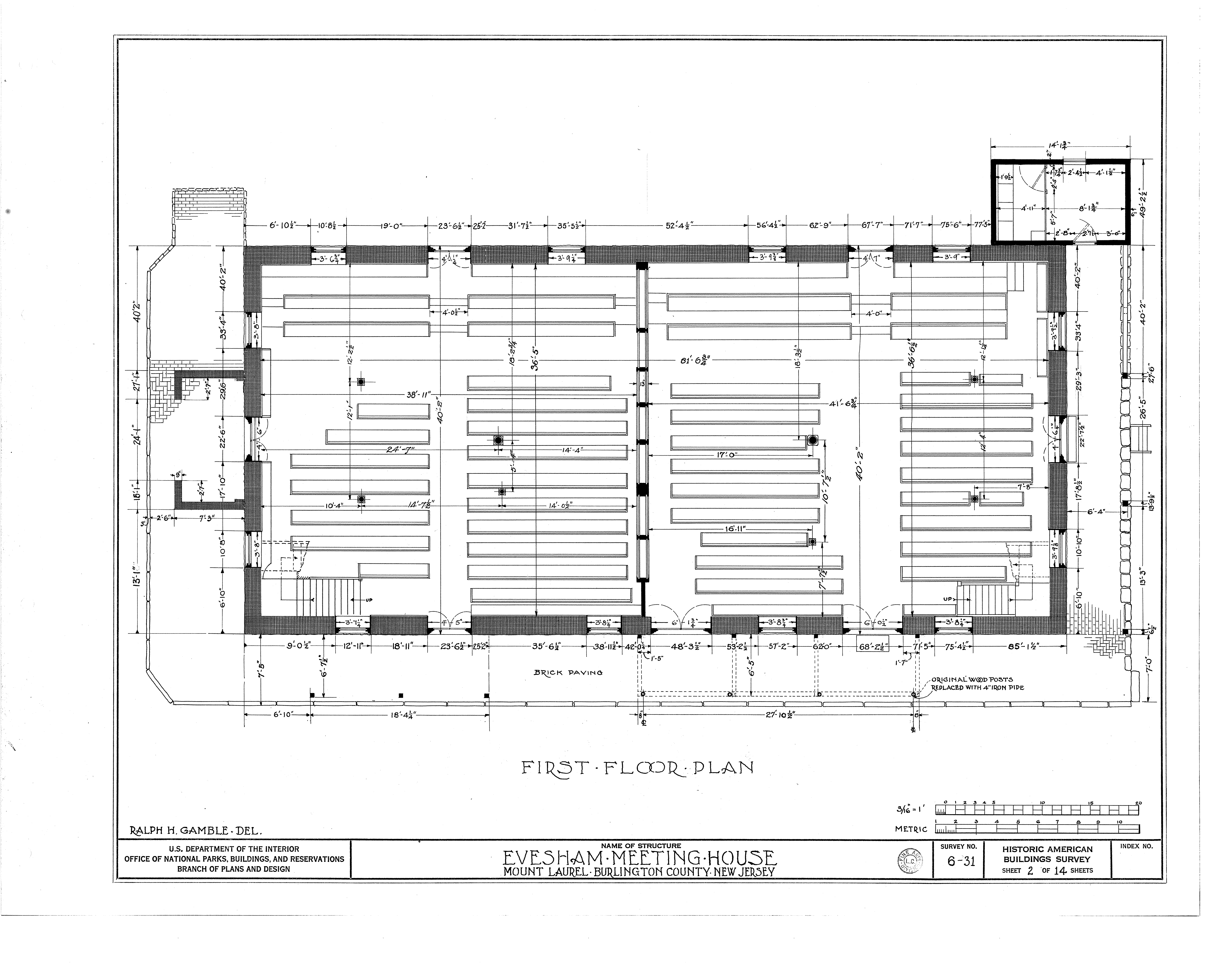
First floor plan

Plot plan

== See also ==
- National Register of Historic Places listings in Burlington County, New Jersey
