= Rich Constable =

American lawyer

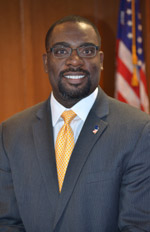

Commissioner of the New Jersey Department of Community Affairs
- In office 2012–2015
- Appointed by: Chris Christie
- Preceded by: Lori Grifa
- Succeeded by: Charles Richman

Personal details
- Born: Richard E. Constable III
- Party: Democratic
- Education: University of Michigan; University of Pennsylvania Law School

Richard E. Constable III is an American lawyer who was the 16th Commissioner of the New Jersey Department of Community Affairs, serving from 2012 to 2015. A former Assistant US Attorney, he was also the Deputy Commissioner of the New Jersey Department of Labor and Workforce Development. Rich Constable currently serves as MSG Entertainment’s chief strategist overseeing legislative, community, and social impact initiatives.

== Early life and education ==
Constable was raised in East Orange, New Jersey, and graduated from Seton Hall Preparatory School. He attended the University of Michigan, where he was awarded a Harry S. Truman Scholarship, and graduated magna cum laude in 1994 with a Bachelor of Arts degree in Political Science. In 1997, he received his J.D. degree and Master of Public Administration from the University of Pennsylvania.

== Career ==
After graduating from law school, Constable clerked for Minnesota Supreme Court Justice and NFL Hall of Fame inductee Alan Page. Constable then worked as a litigation associate with Sullivan & Cromwell LLP in New York City from 1998 to 2002. Subsequently, he was hired by Chris Christie as a federal prosecutor with the U.S. Attorney's Office in Newark. For eight years, Constable represented the United States in criminal matters including public corruption, government, tax, and mortgage fraud. He investigated and prosecuted high-profile elected and appointed officials including US senators, state assemblymen, and mayors charged with bribery and extortion.

In 2010, he left the U.S. Attorney's office to join the New Jersey Department of Labor and Workforce Development as Deputy Commissioner, where he managed the daily operations. Along with Commissioner Harold J. Wirths, Constable implemented several administrative and programmatic reforms to streamline the efficiency of the department. Constable was also an adjunct professor at Rutgers School of Law–Newark and Fordham Law School in New York. In 2011 he was appointed Commissioner of the NJ Department of Community Affairs by Governor Christie. As commissioner, Constable chaired the Council on Affordable Housing, the Interagency Council on Homelessness, the New Jersey Housing and Mortgage Finance Agency, the New Jersey Redevelopment Authority, and the New Jersey Meadowlands Commission.

Constable resigned as commissioner in 2015 and joined the private sector.

== Commissioner of NJ Department of Community Affairs ==
On November 21, 2011, Governor Chris Christie announced that he chose Constable to join his cabinet as Commissioner of the New Jersey Department of Community Affairs (DCA), and replace incumbent Commissioner Lori Grifa. Christie stated that Constable was "someone who has worked with me for years and whom I have turned to many times for his leadership skills, integrity and friendship." Constable was unanimously confirmed, by the NJ State Senate, as DCA Commissioner in 2012. Constable, a lifelong Democrat, said of working in the Christie Administration, "I'm not working for a Republican governor, I'm working for Chris Christie, a man I've known for years, a friend." When Constable stepped down in March 2015, he was succeeded by Charles Richman.

=== Council on Affordable Housing ===
As DCA Commissioner, Constable was the chair of the NJ Council on Affordable Housing (COAH). COAH met April 30, 2014, and voted 5–1 to adopt proposed new guidelines that govern municipal and contractor obligations to provide affordable housing in the state as mandated by the New Jersey Supreme Court in a January 2014 ruling. The proposed rules called for roughly 110,000 affordable housing units to be added across the state between 2014 and 2024.

=== Hurricane Sandy ===
On Monday, October 29, 2012, Hurricane Sandy caused unprecedented damage to New Jersey's housing, business, infrastructure, health, social service and environmental sectors. Immediately following the storm, Governor Christie selected Commissioner Constable and DCA as the lead agency in providing Sandy-displaced families with temporary and permanent housing options. The DCA was entrusted to administer billions in federal Community Development Block Grant Disaster Recovery and Federal Emergency Management Agency (FEMA) funds to support efforts to rebuild homes, businesses, and infrastructure.

In 2013, the DCA engaged Hammerman & Gainer Inc. (HGI) to administer the federally funded, $1.2 billion Rehabilitation, Reconstruction, Elevation and Mitigation (RREM) program, which gives grants of up to $150,000 to homeowners to repair and rebuild homes damaged by Sandy. HGI's $68 million bid was $127 million lower than Tetra Tech, the only other bidder. "It would have been fiscally irresponsible for the state to take the higher bidder," said Constable. The $68 million contract was originally meant to run from 2013 to 2016, but in December 2013 was revised to end in January 2014. Initially, the RREM program had problems, leading to complaints from some applicants and Democratic lawmakers. Constable cited HGI's "performance problems" and noted several months of "corrective action" by DCA. HGI's bills totaled $51 million. It was paid $36 million, and $15 million was subject to an arbitration dispute. The DCA subsequently retained ICF International to perform work previously assigned to HGI. At a New Jersey Assembly Budget Committee hearings, in April 2014, Constable said "the good news is that we're at a place now where the concerns that were widely publicized don't exist anymore."
