= Charles Richman (commissioner) =

Commissioner of the New Jersey Department of Community Affairs
- In office 2015 – January 16, 2018; Acting
- Preceded by: Rich Constable
- Succeeded by: Sheila Oliver
- In office July 23, 2009 – February 2012
- Preceded by: Joseph Doria
- Succeeded by: Rich Constable
- In office June 2005 – January 2006
- Preceded by: Susan Bass Levin
- Succeeded by: Susan Bass Levin

Deputy Commissioner of the New Jersey Department of Community Affairs
- In office February 2012 – January 16, 2018

Personal details
- Education: American University

Charles Richman was the commissioner of the New Jersey Department of Community Affairs from 2015 until January 2018, when he was succeeded by Sheila Oliver, who was appointed by the Governor to head the department in her role as Lieutenant Governor of New Jersey. Richman also served as the acting commissioner of the department during three New Jersey gubernatorial administrations.

Richman has held positions in multiple state agencies in New Jersey during his career. In 1977, he was Acting Administrator of the State Energy Office. He was Assistant Commissioner of Energy in 1979.

Richman is a career DCA employee and was first appointed deputy commissioner in early 2005 by Commissioner Susan Bass Levin. When Levin resigned in June 2005 to become operations director for the campaign of Gov. Jon Corzine, Governor Codey appointed Richman, a resident of Freehold Township, as DCA's acting commissioner. Richman served as acting commissioner until January 2006, when Governor Corzine reappointed Levin as commissioner.

In February 2012, Commissioner Rich Constable named Richman deputy commissioner. Upon Constable's resignation in 2015, Richman was named acting commissioner.

== See also ==
- Governorship of Chris Christie

Preceded by Susan Bass Levin	Acting Commissioner of the New Jersey Department of Community Affairs; June 2005 – January 2006	Succeeded by Susan Bass Levin
Preceded by Joseph Doria	Acting Commissioner of the New Jersey Department of Community Affairs; July 2009 – February 2010	Succeeded by Lori Grifa
Preceded by Rich Constable	Commissioner of the New Jersey Department of Community Affairs; July 2009 – January 2018	Succeeded by Sheila Oliver
