= Mount Laurel Schools =

School district in Burlington County, New Jersey, US

Address
- 330 Mount Laurel Road Mount Laurel, Burlington County, New Jersey, 08054; United States
- Coordinates: 39.943625°N 74.90468°W

District information
- Grades: Pre-K to 8
- Superintendent: George J. Rafferty
- Business administrator: Robert F. Wachter Jr.
- Schools: 8

Students and staff
- Enrollment: 4,336 (as of 2023–24)
- Faculty: 350.0 FTEs
- Student–teacher ratio: 12.0:1

Other information
- District Factor Group: I
- Website: www.mtlaurelschools.org
Ind.	Per pupil	District spending	Rank (*)	K-8 average	%± vs. average
1A	Total Spending	$17,331	44	$18,891	−8.3%
1	Budgetary Cost	13,684	38	14,159	−3.4%
2	Classroom Instruction	8,928	56	8,659	3.1%
6	Support Services	1,648	16	2,167	−24.0%
8	Administrative Cost	1,361	22	1,547	−12.0%
10	Operations & Maintenance	1,550	44	1,612	−3.8%
13	Extracurricular Activities	59	15	104	−43.3%
16	Median Teacher Salary	65,270	66	61,136
Data from NJDoE 2014 Taxpayers' Guide to Education Spending. *Of K-8 districts with more than 750 students. Lowest spending=1; Highest=84

The Mount Laurel Schools is a public school district that serves students in pre-kindergarten through eighth grade from Mount Laurel Township in Burlington County, in the U.S. state of New Jersey. Mount Laurel Township School District includes eight schools.

The grade configuration includes six schools serving pre-kindergarten / kindergarten through fourth-grade students. Students are assigned on a geographic basis to one of the six K-4 schools; Countryside serves the township's northwest; Fleetwood, the northeast; Hillside covers the north central portion of the township; Larchmont, a piece of the eastern side; Parkway, covers the western portion; and Springville the southern tip. All students from the six K-4 schools feed into a single upper elementary school (for grades 5 and 6) and middle school (grades 7 and 8).

As of the 2018–19 school year, the district, comprising eight schools, had an enrollment of 4,214 students and 350.0 classroom teachers (on an FTE basis), for a student–teacher ratio of 12.0:1.

The district is classified by the New Jersey Department of Education as being in District Factor Group "I", the second-highest of eight groupings. District Factor Groups organize districts statewide to allow comparison by common socioeconomic characteristics of the local districts. From lowest socioeconomic status to highest, the categories are A, B, CD, DE, FG, GH, I and J.

Public school students from Mount Laurel in ninth through twelfth grades attend Lenape High School, located in Medford Township. As of the 2018–19 school year, the high school had an enrollment of 1,895 students and 156.6 classroom teachers (on an FTE basis), for a student–teacher ratio of 12.1:1. Lenape High School is part of the Lenape Regional High School District, a regional secondary school district in Burlington County that also serves the eight municipalities of Evesham Township, Medford Lakes, Medford Township, Shamong Township, Southampton Township, Tabernacle Township and Woodland Township at its four high schools.

The district has 420 certified staff members and 320 support staff. The district's transportation department operates a tiered busing system that covers the municipality's 22 square miles (57 km^{2}) four times each day. Mount Laurel Schools' maintenance and custodial staff maintains 669,928 square feet (62,238 m^{2}) of educational space on a daily basis.

== History ==
In 1948, during de jure educational segregation in the United States, the district had a school for black children. There was half a block between the white and black schools.

== Awards and recognition ==
Parkway Elementary School was one of four schools in New Jersey recognized by the National Blue Ribbon Schools Program, awarded by the United States Department of Education, for the 2005–06 school year.

For the 1995–96 school year, Parkway Elementary School was named a "Star School" by the New Jersey Department of Education, the highest honor that a New Jersey school can achieve.

== Schools ==
Schools in the district (with 2018–19 enrollment data from the National Center for Education Statistics) are:

Elementary schools

- Countryside Elementary School (with 309 students; in grades PreK-4)
  - Lori Zataveski, principal
- Fleetwood Elementary School (372; K-4)
  - Michael Profico, principal
- Hillside Elementary School (348; PreK-4)
  - Briean Madden, principal
- Larchmont Elementary School (395; K-4)
  - Dr. Patrice Clark, principal
- Parkway Elementary School (342; K-4)
  - Mercedes Chang, principal
- Springville Elementary School (512; PreK-4)
  - Gailen Mitchell, principal

Middle schools

- Mount Laurel Hartford School (961; 5-6)
  - Marques Stanard, principal
- Thomas E. Harrington Middle School (963; 7-8)
  - Drew Besler, principal

== Administration ==
Core members of the district's administration are:

- George J. Rafferty, superintendent
- Robert F. Wachter Jr., business administrator and board secretary

== Board of education ==
The district's board of education, composed of nine members, sets policy and oversees the fiscal and educational operation of the district through its administration. As a Type II school district, the board's trustees are elected directly by voters to serve three-year terms of office on a staggered basis, with three seats up for election each year held (since 2012) as part of the November general election. The board appoints a superintendent to oversee the district's day-to-day operations and a business administrator to supervise the business functions of the district.
