= New Jersey Department of Community Affairs =

State agency of New Jersey, United States

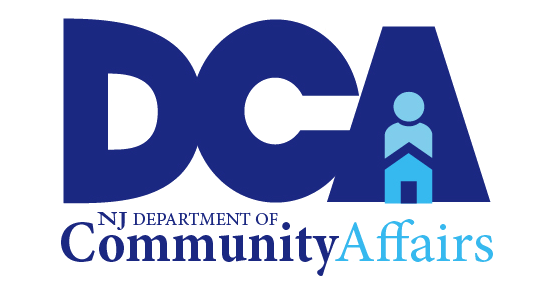
- Logo of the NJDCA

Department overview
- Formed: March 1, 1967; 59 years ago
- Jurisdiction: Government of New Jersey
- Headquarters: 101 South Broad Street, Trenton, NJ 08625
- Annual budget: US$1.9 billion (FY2027) (38% federal)
- Department executive: Jacquelyn A. Suárez, Commissioner
- Website: https://www.nj.gov/dca/

The New Jersey Department of Community Affairs is a governmental agency of the U.S. state of New Jersey.

== Function ==
The NJDCA provides "administrative guidance, financial support, and technical assistance to local governments, community development organizations, businesses and individuals to improve the quality of life in New Jersey."

== Divisions, programs, and services ==
=== Division of Codes and Standards ===
The DCS establishes and enforces building codes, licensing code officials and training to protect the health and safety of New Jerseyans, in partnership with the state's municipalities. It includes the Bureau of Housing Inspection. It also oversees the implementation of construction codes, amusement ride inspections, gas installations, boarding house licenses, and the New Home Warranty Program.

Edward Smith is the director of the DCS.

=== Division of Housing and Community Resources ===
The DCR provides financial and technical assistance to municipalities, community action agencies, and other non-profit organizations in order to promote community development and economic development within the community. Also, it aids local government agencies and non-profit organizations seeking to improve the quality of life for low-income residents. Specific programs include energy assistance, community services, and neighborhood programs. The DH works with municipalities, non-profit organizations, private developers, and the New Jersey Housing Mortgage Financing Agency to promote community development by facilitating homeownership and housing. The DH oversees Section 8 housing assistance programs, which are funded by the United States Department of Housing and Urban Development. Other programs seek to create housing opportunities in viable neighborhoods for low-income households, to fund the development of affordable housing throughout the state, and to expand the capacity of non-profit organizations to develop affordable housing. The DH works together with the U.S. Department of Housing and Urban Development and the Council on Affordable Housing.

Janel Winter is the director of the DHCR.

=== Division of Fire Safety ===
The DFS is New Jersey's central fire agency, responsible for training firefighters and developing and enforcing the state fire code.

Richard Mikutsky is the director of the DFS.

=== Division of Local Government Services ===
The DLGS works with local governments to ensure their financial integrity and solvency and to ensure that they comply with state regulations. Melanie Walter is the director of the DLGS.

=== Sandy Recovery Division ===
The SRD manages the majority of the federal funds being used to assist the State in recovering from Superstorm Sandy. These funds come from the Community Development Block Grant (CDBG) Disaster Recovery programs of the U.S. Department of Housing and Urban Development. The division is committed to efficiently and effectively addressing the long-term needs of New Jersey's Sandy-impacted residents and communities through programs designed to help homeowners, tenants, landlords, developers and local governments.

== Affiliated agencies ==
=== New Jersey Housing and Mortgage Finance Agency ===
The New Jersey Housing and Mortgage Finance Agency (NJHMFA) is an affiliated independent agency within DCA that finances affordable housing and mortgages for low- and moderate-income households. It administers federal Low-Income Housing Tax Credits and runs the New Jersey Housing Resource Center (NJHRC), a housing locator service.

=== New Jersey Historic Trust ===
The New Jersey Historic Trust, located within DCA, provides grants and easements to preserve the state’s historic properties.

== Commissioners ==
Commissioners of the Department of Community Affairs include:

- Paul Ylvisaker (1967–1970)
- Edmund Hume (1970–1971)
- Lawrence "Pat" Kramer (1971–1974)
- Patricia Sheehan (1974–1978)
- Joseph A. LeFante (1978–1982)
- John Renna (1982–1985)
- Leonard S. Coleman Jr. (1986–1988)
- Anthony M. Villane (1988–1990)
- Randy Primas (1990–1992)
- Stephanie R. Bush (1992–1994)
- Harriet E. Derman (1994–1996)
- Jane Kenny (1996–2001)
- Susan Bass Levin (2002–2007)
- Joseph Doria (2007–2009)
- Laurie Griffa (2010–2012)
- Richard Constable (2012–2015)
- Charles Richman (2015–2018)
- Sheila Oliver (2018–2023)
- Jacquelyn A. Suárez (2023–Present)

== Related legislation ==
- 1966: Department of Community Affairs Act of 1966, P.L. 1966, c. 293
