= Council on Affordable Housing =

Former State agency of New Jersey, United States

State of New Jersey Council on Affordable Housing

Agency overview
- Formed: 1985
- Jurisdiction: New Jersey
- Headquarters: 101 South Broad Street; Trenton, NJ 08625
- Agency executives: Rich Constable, Chairman; Lucy Vandenberg, Executive Director
- Parent agency: New Jersey Department of Community Affairs
- Website: www.state.nj.us/dca/affiliates/coah/

The Council on Affordable Housing (COAH) was, until its abolition in 2024, an agency of the Government of New Jersey within the New Jersey Department of Community Affairs that was responsible for ensuring that all 566 New Jersey municipalities provided their fair share of low and moderate income housing

The A4/S50 New Jersey law, signed in 2024, requires towns to plan for and allow more affordable housing. It updated how housing obligations are calculated and enforced and abolished the Council on Affordable Housing (COAH), shifting oversight away from that agency.

== History ==
The COAH was created by the New Jersey Legislature in response to the Fair Housing Act of 1985 and a series of New Jersey Supreme Court rulings that are known as the Mount Laurel doctrine.

With 11 members appointed by the Governor on the advice and consent of the Senate, COAH was empowered to: (1) define housing regions, (2) estimate low and moderate income housing needs, (3) set criteria and guidelines for municipalities to determine and address their own fair share numbers and then (4) review and approve Housing Elements and Fair Share Plans and Regional Contribution Agreements (RCAs) for municipalities. As a quasi-judicial organization, COAH could also impose resource restraints and consider motions regarding housing plans.

As of January 2006, 287 of New Jersey's 566 municipalities were part of the COAH process, and another 78 were under the court's jurisdiction. There were at least two COAH municipalities in each of the state's 21 counties. Bergen County had 42 of its 70 municipalities involved, the highest number in the state, with Morris County's 29 municipalities ranking second.

Municipalities originally were allowed to enter into a Regional Contribution Agreement (RCA), which allows them to pay a fee to another municipality that agrees to provide affordable housing units to fulfill up to half of the sending municipality's COAH obligations. The sending municipality must pay a negotiated fee for each unit transferred. For example, Marlboro Township signed an agreement in June 2008 that will have Trenton build or rehabilitate 332 housing units (out of Marlboro's 1,600-unit obligation), with Marlboro paying $25,000 per unit, a total of $8.3 million to Trenton for taking on the responsibility for these units.

RCAs were suppressed by the state's housing laws on July 17, 2008.

== COAH's defunct status as of 2017 ==
On March 10, 2015, the New Jersey Supreme Court divested COAH of jurisdiction of municipal housing plans. Towns must now petition the lower court for approval of their housing plans. Builders, developers and other interested parties may intervene in such proceedings, which are known as declaratory judgment actions.

On February 9, 2010, Governor Chris Christie had suspended COAH and appointed a committee in preparation to dismantle it. The Supreme Court ruled that it was not within his power "“to abolish independent agencies that were created by legislative action”. It also ordered COAH to come up with new regulations regarding the development of affordable housing. COAH passed new guidelines on May 1, 2014, which increase the number of units developers are permitted to build in exchange for one affordable housing unit from four to nine. When asked, the agency refused to provide the contract for the Rutgers University professor who prepared the plan and claimed that the documents used to calculate the new guidelines had been lost, leading an affordable housing group to offer a $1,000 reward. In July 2014, a superior judge ruled that the contract must be released and search conducting for the missing documents.

In October 2014 the COAH Board failed to meet the deadline by the Supreme Court for establishing new Third Round guidelines, when the board voted, 3–3, to adopt the proposal. In the absence of action by the state, the New Jersey Supreme Court ruled in March 2015, that determination of affordable housing obligations would be administered by the court.

== Additional history ==
=== Council on Affordable Housing (COAH) ===
In 1985, the New Jersey legislature passed the Fair Housing Act, which codified the affordable housing obligations of municipalities and created a state agency called the Council on Affordable Housing (COAH).

With 11 members appointed by the Governor on the advice and consent of the Senate, COAH was empowered to: (1) define housing regions, (2) estimate low and moderate income housing needs, (3) set criteria and guidelines for municipalities to determine and address their own fair share numbers and then (4) review and approve Housing Elements and Fair Share Plans and Regional Contribution Agreements (RCAs) for municipalities. As a quasi-judicial organization, COAH could also impose resource restraints and consider motions regarding housing plans.

In New Jersey, the amount of affordable housing units each municipality should provide is determined in rounds. This allows each municipality to adjust for an ever-changing demand for affordable housing. These calculations have been based on different methodologies throughout the years. During the first two rounds of affordable housing obligations, calculations were based on the “fair share” method.

During the third round of affordable housing obligations, COAH introduced calculations based on the “growth share” method. During these three rounds, a total of 1,469 deed-restricted affordable units per year were created. COAH faced significant pushback with this methodology as housing advocates claimed the affordable housing produced was insufficient to address the need. This criticism, coupled with political pressure and allegations of inaction from COAH, ultimately led to the New Jersey Supreme Court decision, Mount Laurel IV, that COAH had failed. COAH was effectively stripped of its power and jurisdiction over affordable housing production was given back to the courts. The Court also appointed Fair Share Housing Center to represent the interests of the public.

COAH developed regulations under which the specific number of affordable units that each municipality would be required to provide (its "pre-credited need") could be determined. Participating municipalities developed compliance plans to address this need by such means as the application of credits (e.g. filtering, spontaneous rehabilitation, extra credit for rental units), the use of regional contribution agreements (transferring part of the obligation to a willing municipality, usually an urban center, in the same region along with payment in an amount agreed by the municipalities) and zoning for affordable housing (usually involving increased density and mandatory set-asides). When COAH approved a municipality's compliance plan it would grant "substantive certification" which was designed to provide the municipality with protection from exclusionary zoning litigation.

From the municipal point of view, the advantages of COAH's administrative process included the use of a formula to calculate fair share that might produce a lower obligation than the court would impose, the availability of the regional contribution agreement to reduce the number of units and the ability to determine where in the municipality that affordable housing ought to be developed rather than being forced to permit a development as a reward to a successful builder-plaintiff. Those municipalities that chose not to participate in COAH's administrative process remained vulnerable to exclusionary zoning lawsuits and the prospect of the builder's remedy. The disadvantage would be that a participating municipality might be required to zone some land in a manner that extra housing would be produced. Some municipalities, believing that the likelihood of facing an actual exclusionary zoning lawsuit was low enough, took their chances in not participating.
