= Sledding =

Gliding sport

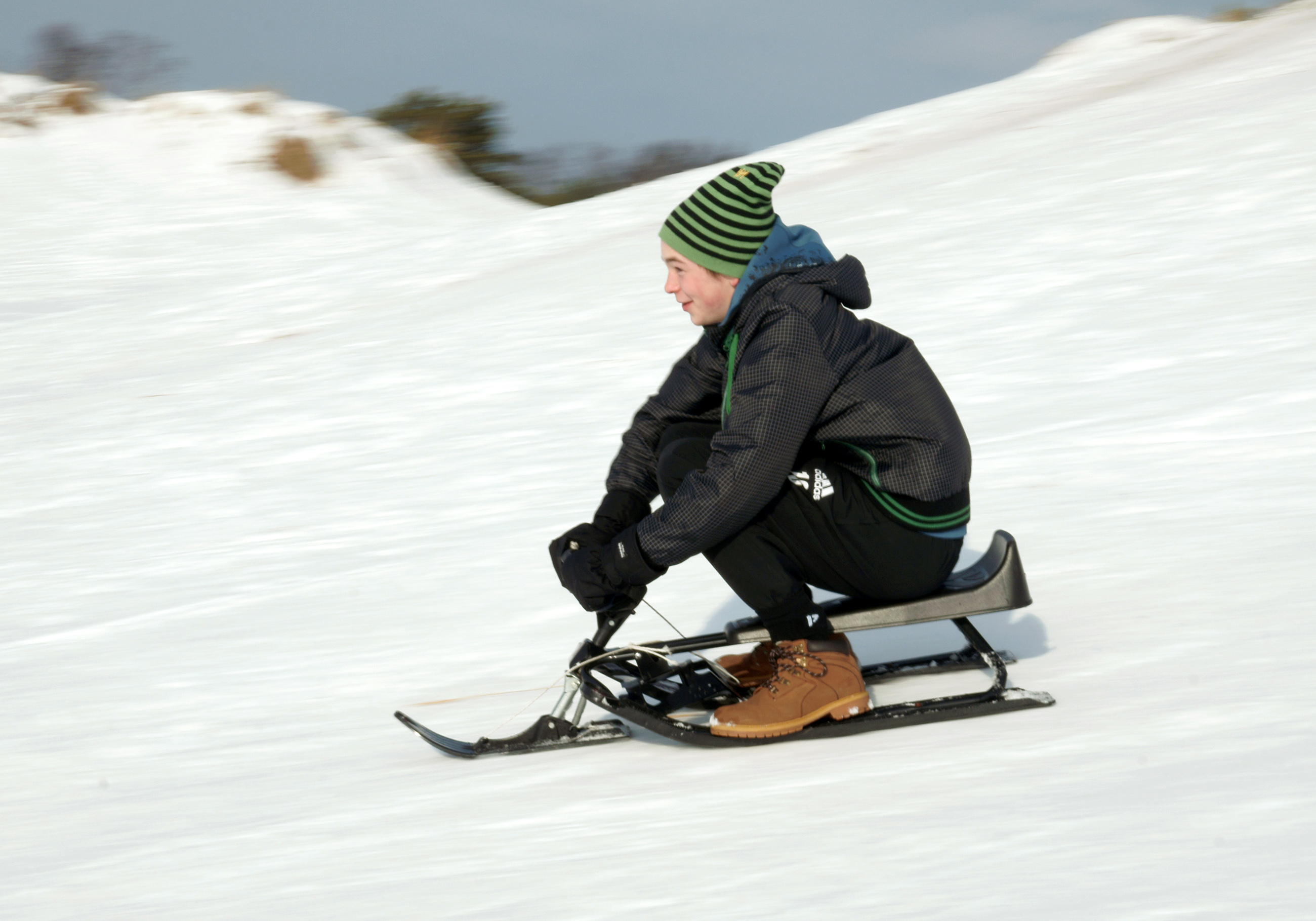
Sledding in Yyteri, Finland.

Children sledding in a park, 18 secs video

Sledding, sledging or sleighing is a winter sport typically carried out in a prone or seated position on a vehicle generically known as a sled (North American), a sledge (British), or a sleigh. It is the basis of three Olympic sports: luge, skeleton and bobsledding. When practised on sand, it is known as a form of sandboarding. In Russia sledges are used for maritime activities including fishing and commuting from island to island on ice.

Sledding in Podkowa Leśna, Poland, Feb., 2010

== History ==
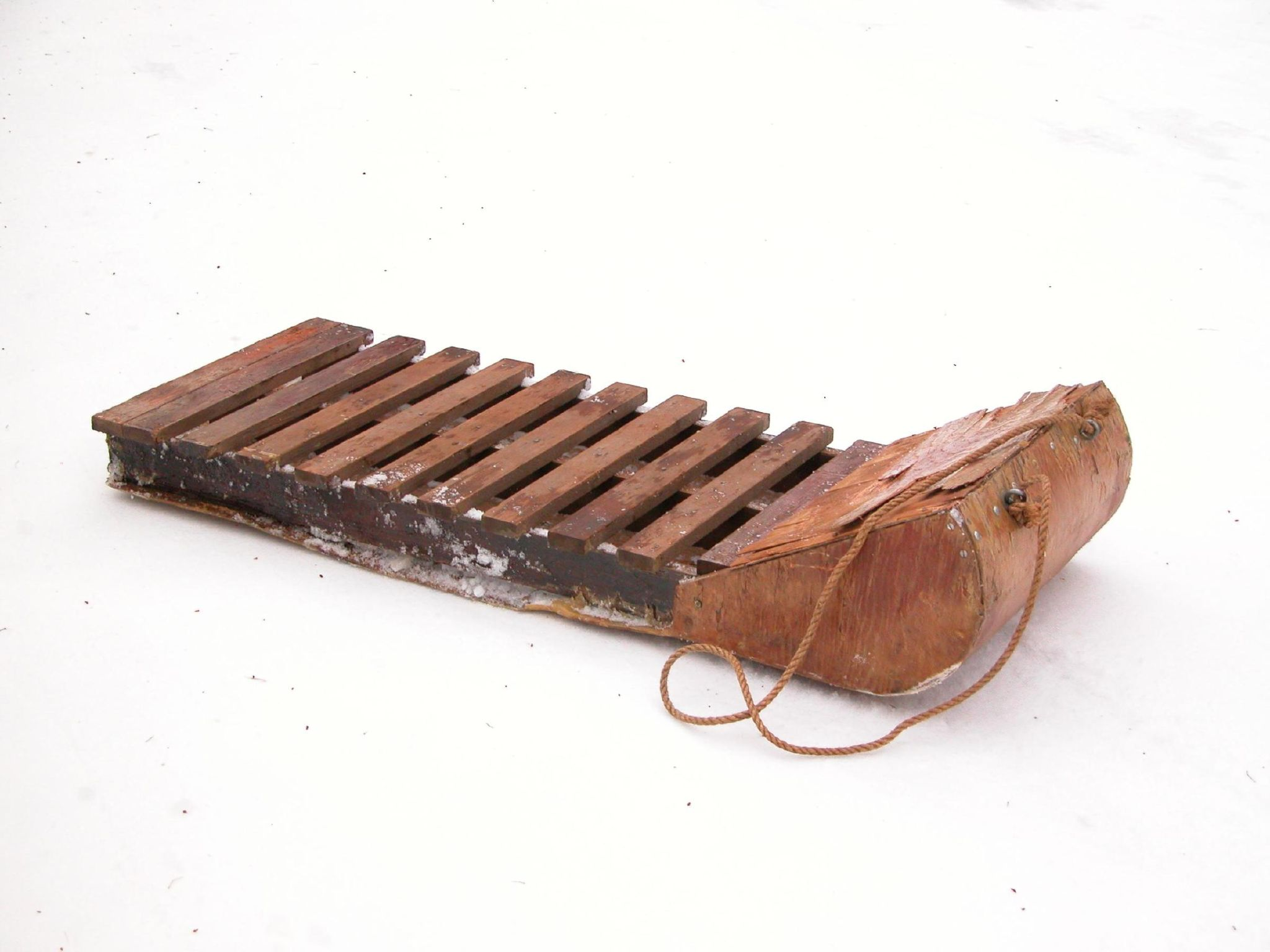
Old-fashioned wooden sled (or Toboggan without runners)

The practical use of sleds is ancient and widespread. They were used as vehicles to transport materials and/or people, often in icy and snowy conditions. Early designs included hand-pulled sizes as well as larger dog, reindeer, horse, or ox drawn versions. Early examples of sleds and sledges were found dating from around 10,000 BCE, and in the Oseberg Viking ship excavation. The toboggan is also a traditional form of transport used by the Dene, Innu and Cree of northern Canada, and the people of Ancient Egypt are thought to have used sledges (on the desert sand and on ramps) extensively for construction.

== Modern sledding ==
The generic term sledding refers to traveling down a snowy hill using a sled such as a Flexible Flyer with wooden slats and metal runners. It is usually done during the winter when there is snow. Flat plastic or aluminum discs and improvised sleds (carrier bags, baking trays, cafeteria trays, sheets of cardboard, etc.) may also be used. The activity has been known to exist as a fringe recreational activity far into the distant murky past in toboggan-type sleds which seasonally supplant the ubiquitous cart.

== Back country sledding ==
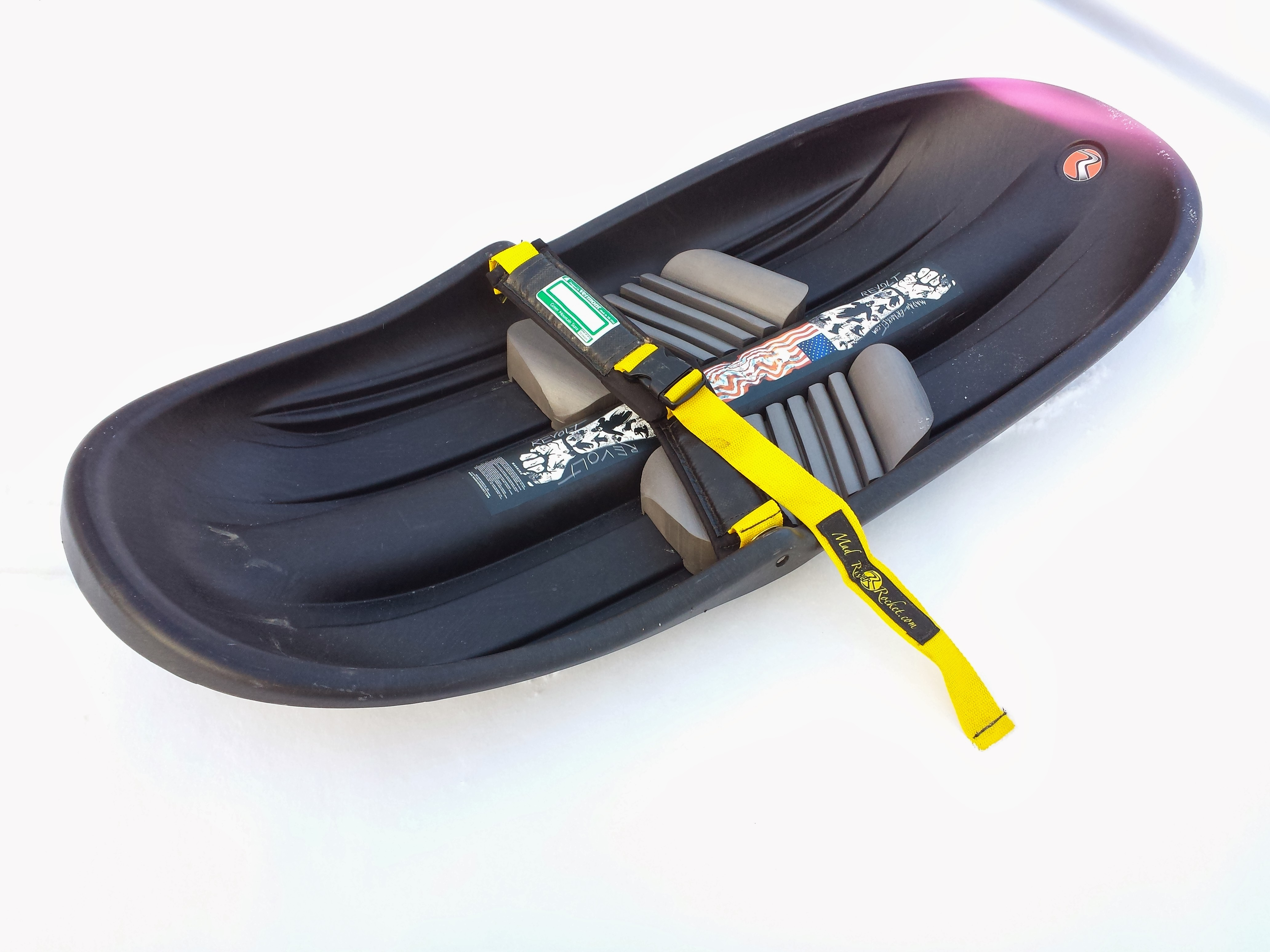
A backcountry sled (a kid's size Mad River Rocket – Stinger)

In contrast to the more common forms of sledding, back country sledding involves four important elements in combination: a great amount of directional control, flotation, a binding system, and padding. First, back country sleds are made of strong plastic material, with the snow-side surface possessing various grooves and chines for directional control. Second, the plastic construction, with a large amount of snow-side surface area keeps the sled afloat in deeper snow conditions (the same principle behind wider powder skis or snowboards). Though the original runner sleds possessed directional control, their thin runner blades bogged down in anything but icy or thin snow conditions. Disk sleds, on the other hand, possessed flotation but no directional control. Third, modern back country sleds have a binding system, which usually consists of a simple belt strap that attaches to the sides of the sled. With the sledder in the kneeling position, the strap may go over the sledder's thighs or calves before connecting with the strap from the other side of the sled with some sort of buckling device. Finally, back country sleds have foam pads glued for the sledder to kneel on for shock absorption. One such sled is the Mad River Rocket.

Back country sledding is a closer kin to back country alpine skiing or snowboarding than to traditional "pile the family in the van and go to the local hill" type of sledding. The terrain for back country sledding includes powder-filled steeps, open mountain bowls, cliff-filled ridges, and basically anywhere that one finds the powder, steeps, rocks and trees. Back country sleds, with the binding system and padding, may also be used for freestyle moves such as spins and flips off jumps and rail slides. Though similarities exist between back country sledding and alpine skiing/snowboarding, important differences separate the disciplines. From a technical perspective, the lack of a metal edge and the lower center of gravity make it more difficult to control a back country sled on icy or packed snow surfaces. From an access perspective, alpine resorts do not allow sledding on the actual mountain, except for the occasional small tubing hill.

== Recreational sledding techniques ==
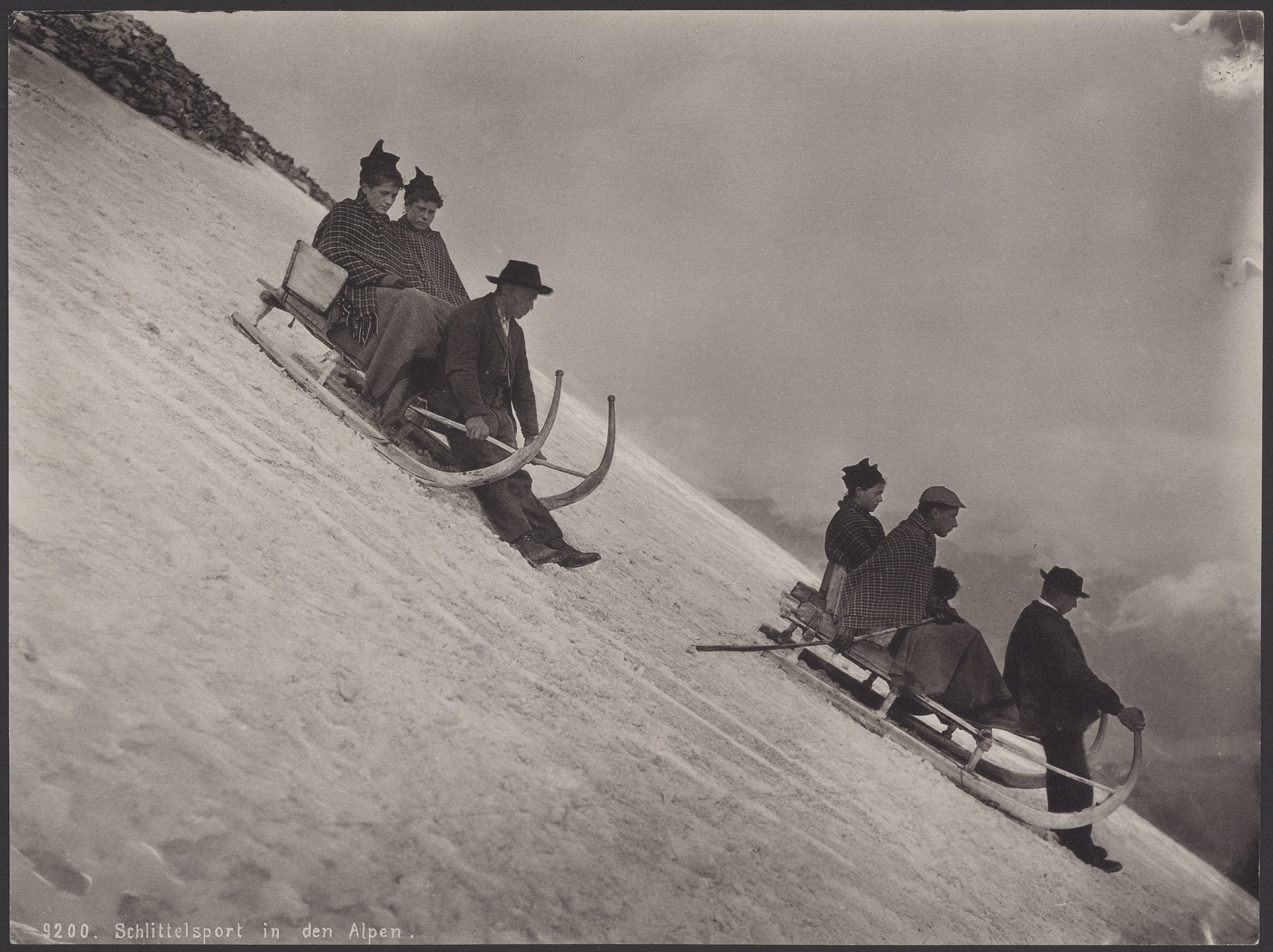
Schlitteln, Schweizer Alpen, ~1890–1910

The first ride down a hill on a sled is the most important, but also the most difficult, as it determines the path of the sled for the following runs down the hill. Users may steer the sled along the most exciting course, perhaps adding twists and turns to make the run down the hill faster or more exciting. Other techniques to improve the ride include turning around, lying on the stomach, or closing both eyes. Running up to a sled and jumping onto it can create additional momentum and improve ride speed; this can be referred to as "Flopping."

There are five types of sleds commonly used today: runner sleds, toboggans, disks, tubes and backcountry sleds. Each type has advantages and disadvantages if one is trying to get the most out of a given slope.

With each course down the hill, the sled's path through the snow can become more icy. Sleds with a greater surface area (anything but runner sleds) are able to make the first runs a great deal easier than the variety of sleds with metal runners. Runner sleds are typically faster once the snow has compacted or turned icy. In the 1880s, Samuel Leeds Allen invented the first steerable runner sled, the Flexible Flyer. Since that date, the ability to steer the sled away from obstacles has led people to believe it to be more appropriate choice for the safety conscious. On the other hand, the hard wood or metal front section of steerable runner sleds is far more likely to cause serious injury if it strikes a person, or if the hands are caught between the steering mechanism and a solid object in a crash. Each year, around 30,000 children in the US are injured in sledding, with one in 25 injuries requiring hospitalization. In a majority of these serious cases, young children are riding runner sleds in a prone position, and suffer hand and finger injuries when they are caught under the runners or between the sled and another object. In addition, runner sleds force the weight of the rider onto two thin runners where the pressure causes a microscopic film of snow or ice to melt as the sled passes over it. This invisible layer of fluid reduces friction, causing the sled's speed to greatly exceed that of its flat bottomed relatives.

With the control of a backcountry sled, stunts become possible. Sledding off cliffs and doing tricks off jumps is known as extreme sledding.

== Competitive sledding ==
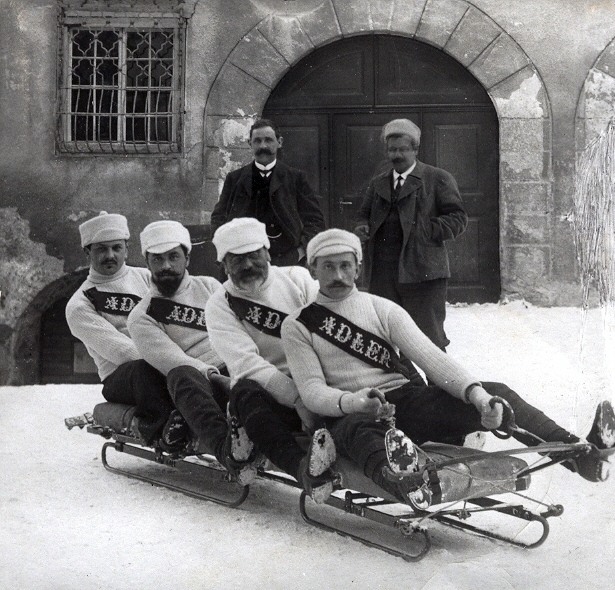
The Swiss bobsleigh team from Davos, ca. 1910

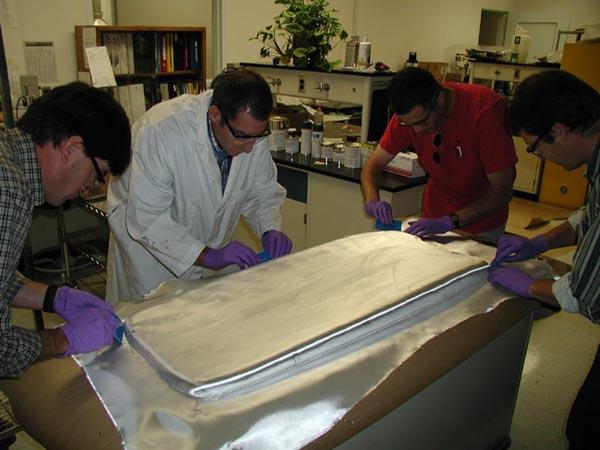
Building a high tech modern Skeleton sled for Olympic grade racing.

Sweden and Norway recorded some early Kicksled Races during the 15th century. The modern sport of sledding (Luge – Skeleton and Bobsledding) originated in St. Moritz, Switzerland in the mid-to-late 19th century when vacationing guests adapted delivery sleds for recreational purposes and from there, it quickly spread to Davos and other Swiss towns and villages.

Modern competitive sledding started in 1883 in Davos, Switzerland. An Australian student named George Robertson won what is reputed to be the world's first international sled race. He outraced 19 other competitors from England, Germany, the Netherlands, Sweden, Switzerland and the United States on a four kilometre stretch of road from St. Wolfgang to the town of Klosters. Soon the Bobsleigh, Luge, and Skeleton were developed in succession. By mid-decade, Kulm Hotel owner Caspar Badrutt had the first run or course purpose built for the fledgling sport. The opening of formal competition for Luge was in 1883 and for Bobsleds in 1884 at St. Moritz. in 1926, the International Olympic Committee declared bobsleigh and skeleton as Olympic sports and adopted the rules of the St. Moritz run as the officially recognized Olympic rules. It was not until 2002, however, that skeleton itself was added permanently to the Olympic program with the 2002 Winter Olympics in Salt Lake City, Utah.

There are three Olympic sledding competitions. Bobsled: Men's two and four-crew, Women's 2 crew. Luge: Men's singles, Men's doubles, Women's singles (Team Relay – Olympic discipline starting in 2014). Skeleton: Men's singles, Women's singles

Time line for key Competitive Sledding events

- 1883 – First international luge competition in Davos, Switzerland
- 1883 – First organized meeting for Luge and Skeleton at St. Moritz, Switzerland
- 1884 – St Moritz Tobogganing Club (SMTC) and Cresta Run founded in St. Moritz, Switzerland
- 1884 – First organized meeting for Bobsleds at St. Moritz, Switzerland
- 1897 – First bobsleigh club founded in St. Moritz, Switzerland
- 1904 – The Olympia Bobrun at St. Moritz, the first purpose built Bobsled track (Bobrun) built by Emil Thoma and the last remaining natural Bobrun of the world
- 1906 – First Skeleton competition outside of Switzerland (in Mürzzuschlag, Austria)
- -- (Skeleton a Swiss competition only until 1906)
- 1913 – First International Sled Sports Federation founded in Dresden, Germany
- -- (governed Bobsled, Luge and Skeleton until 1923 and Luge only until 1935)
- 1914 – First European Luge Championships at Liberec, Czech Republic
- 1923 – FITB (Fédération Internationale de Bobsleigh et de Tobogganing) created for Bobsleigh and Skeleton in Paris, France
- 1924 – First appearance of bobsleigh competition at the I. Winter Olympics in Chamonix
- 1926 – Bobsleigh and Skeleton final approval for Olympic competition
- 1928 – First Bobsleigh and Skeleton appearance at the II. Winter Olympics in St. Moritz, Switzerland
- 1930 – First FIBT World Championships (4-man Bobsled)
- 1932 – First two-man Bobsled competition at the III. Winter Olympics in Lake Placid, USA
- 1935 – Luge incorporated into the FIBT (Fédération Internationale de Bobsleigh et de Tobogganing)
- 1948 – Bobsleigh and Skeleton 2nd appearance at the V. Winter Olympics in St. Moritz, Switzerland
- 1954 – IOC determined that Luge would replace skeleton as a Winter Olympic discipline
- 1955 – First Luge World Championships in Oslo, Norway
- 1957 – International Luge Federation (FIL) founded
- 1964 – First Luge appearance at the IX. winter Olympics at Innsbruck, Austria
- 1969 – First artificially refrigerated track in at Königssee/Berchtesgaden, Germany
- 1984 – First Bobsleigh World Cup
- 1987 – First Skeleton European Championships
- 1989 – First Skeleton World Championships
- 2002 – Skeleton competition reintroduced for the XIX. Winter Olympics in Salt Lake City, USA

== See also ==
- Ice blocking
- Snowmobiling, or the genericized name of ski-dooing.
- Hawaiian lava sledding

== External links and notes ==
- Video Footage of Traditional Rail Sleds Example of Traditional sleds on the world's longest lighted sled run.
- Sled Riding Locations Across North America North America's largest database of sled riding hills.
- Airboarding – A New Winter Sport Online article
- Places to sled Find a hill (Resource tool)
- Sledding locations Find sledding spots
- Mad River Rocket backcountry sled official website.
