= Moorestown, New Jersey =

- Township
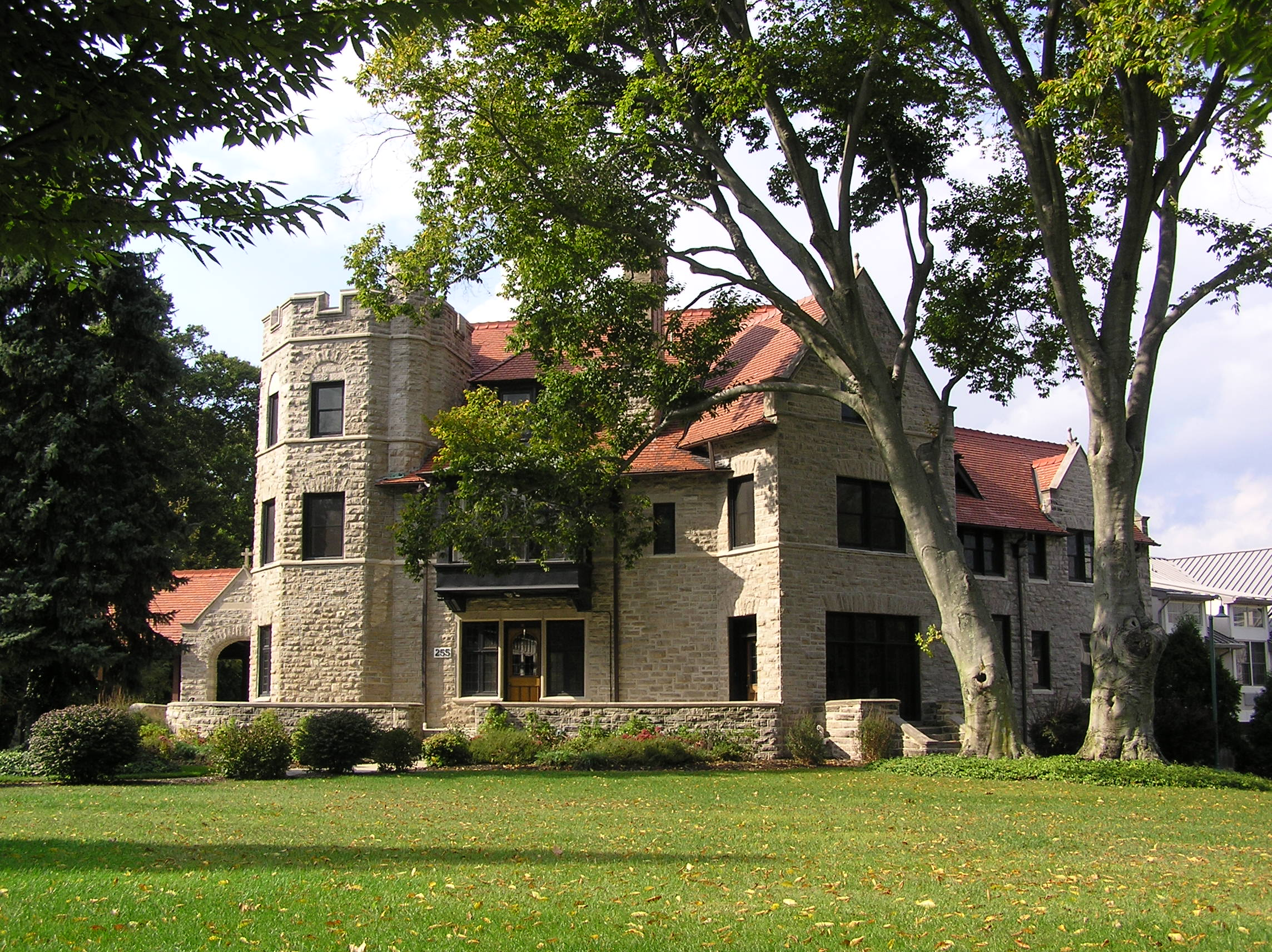
- Breidenhart was listed on the National Register of Historic Places in 1977.

- Seal

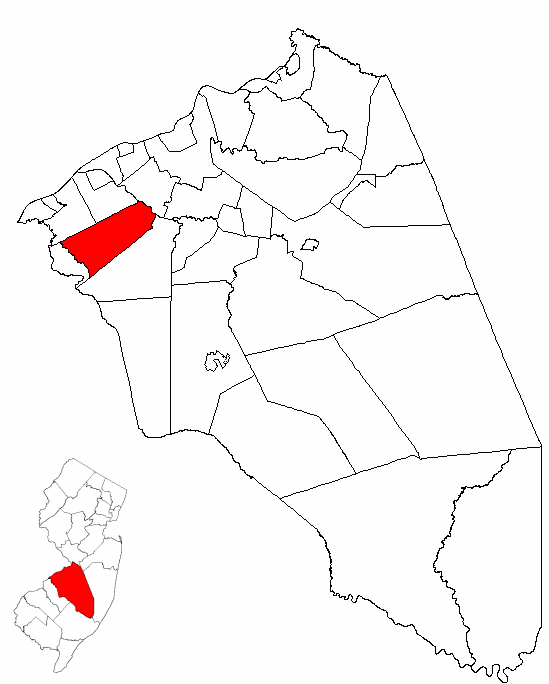
- Moorestown Township highlighted in Burlington County. Inset map: Burlington County highlighted in New Jersey.

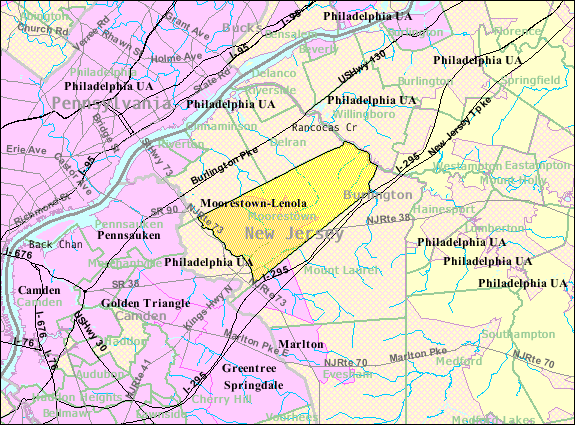
- Census Bureau map of Moorestown, New Jersey

- Location in Burlington County Location in New Jersey Location in the United States
- Coordinates: 39.978716°N 74.942651°W
- Country: United States
- State: New Jersey
- County: Burlington
- Founded: 1682
- Incorporated: March 11, 1922

Government
  - Type: Faulkner Act (council–manager)
  - Body: Township Council
  - Mayor: Quinton Law (D, term ends December 31, 2025)
  - Manager: Kevin Aberant
  - Municipal clerk: Patricia L. Hunt

Area
  - Total: 14.94 sq mi (38.70 km^{2})
  - Land: 14.73 sq mi (38.15 km^{2})
  - Water: 0.21 sq mi (0.55 km^{2}) 1.43%
  - Rank: 175th of 565 in state 16th of 40 in county
- Elevation: 69 ft (21 m)

Population (2020)
  - Total: 21,355
  - Estimate (2023): 21,577 ▲
  - Rank: 131st of 565 in state 7th of 40 in county
  - Density: 1,449.9/sq mi (559.8/km^{2})
  - Rank: 339th of 565 in state 20th of 40 in county
- Time zone: UTC−05:00 (Eastern (EST))
  - Summer (DST): UTC−04:00 (Eastern (EDT))
- ZIP Code: 08057
- Area codes: 609 and 856
- FIPS code: 3400547880
- GNIS feature ID: 0882095
- Website: www.moorestown.nj.us

Moorestown is a township in Burlington County in the U.S. state of New Jersey. It is an eastern suburb of Philadelphia and geographically part of the South Jersey region of the state. As of the 2020 United States census, the township's population was 21,355, its highest decennial census count ever and an increase of 629 (+3.0%) from the 2010 census count of 20,726, which in turn had reflected an increase of 1,709 (+9.0%) from the 19,017 counted at the 2000 census. The township, and all of Burlington County, is a part of the Philadelphia metropolitan area.

Moorestown was authorized to be incorporated as a township by an act of the New Jersey Legislature on March 11, 1922, from portions of Chester Township (now Maple Shade Township), subject to the approval of voters in the affected area in a referendum. Voters approved the creation on April 25, 1922. The township is named for a Thomas Moore who settled in the area in 1722 and constructed a tavern called Moore's Tavern, though other sources attribute the name to poet Thomas Moore.

Chester Township had banned all liquor sales in 1915, and Moorestown retained the restrictions for more than 70 years after Prohibition ended in 1933. Referendums aiming to repeal the ban failed in both 1935 and 1953. In 2007, the township council approved a referendum that would allow the sale by auction of six liquor licenses (the state limit of one per every 3,000 residents), with estimates that each license could sell over $1 million each. The referendum did not receive enough votes to pass. In 2011, voters repealed the liquor ban; however, liquor sales in the township will be restricted to the Moorestown Mall.

In 2005, Moorestown was ranked number one in Money magazine's list of the 100 best places to live in America. The magazine screened over a thousand small towns and created a list of the top 100 for its August 2005 issue, in which Moorestown earned the top spot.

== History ==
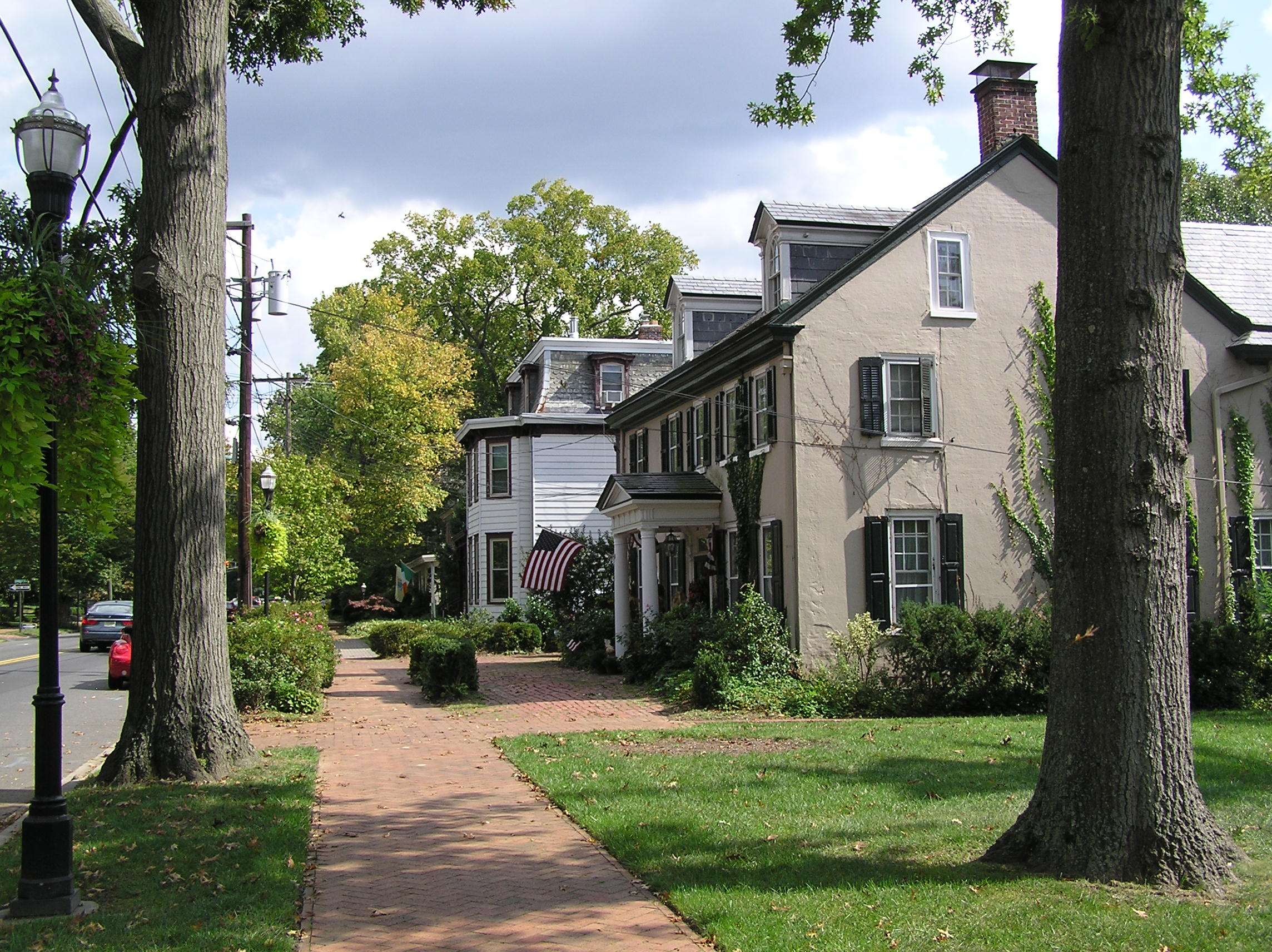
Moorestown Historic District, 2012

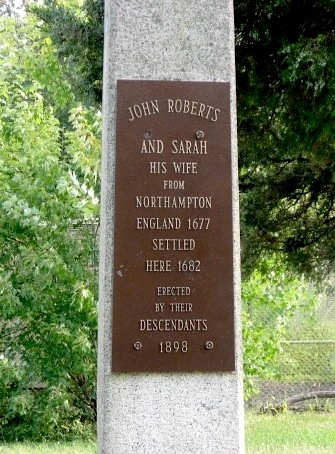
Roberts Monument

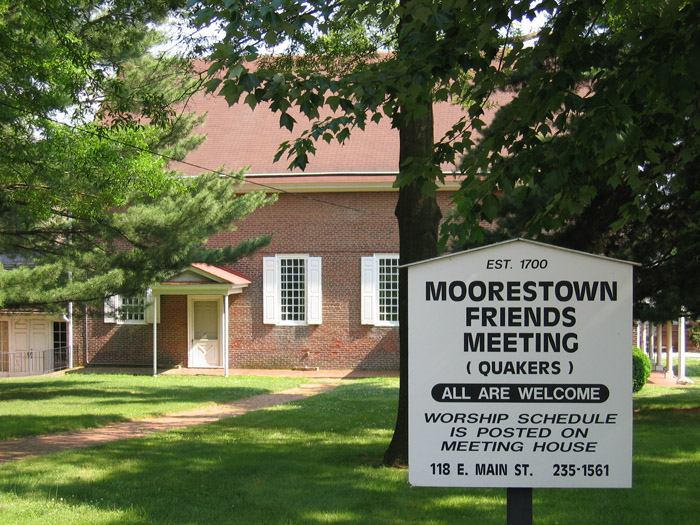
Friends Meeting House

Main Street is located along a ridge historically occupied by the Lenni Lenape Native Americans. Two natural springs, one to the west (off Main Street before reaching the Perkins Center for the Arts, just by Roberts Elementary School) and one to the east (off North Stanwick Road) drew Native Americans and traders to the area.

In 1682, John and Sarah Roberts became the first English-speaking residents of Moorestown when they established their home. Their residence is now marked by the Roberts Monument at the intersection of County Route 537 and Route 73. In May 1686, three years after the founding of Philadelphia, John Rodman bought 500 acres (2.0 km^{2}) on the west side of Chester Township, and Thomas Rodman bought 533 acres (2.2 km^{2}) in the same area; this soon became known as the Village of Rodmantown. The growing area around the eastern spring was known as the Village of Chestertown.

In 1700, the first Society of Friends' Meeting House, built of logs, was erected on the King's Highway. Originally known as Meeting House Lane, Chester Avenue was laid out in 1720. The community at that time probably consisted of a few farmhouses along the King's Highway from Stanwick Road to Locust Street.

Thomas Moore and his wife Elizabeth settled here in 1722. In 1732, Moore purchased 33 acres (130,000 m^{2}) of land on the north side of the King's Highway. The land ran from the west side of the Friends' graveyard on the northwest corner of the King's Highway and Meeting House Lane on the east, and west to Locust Street on the western boundary of his property and north to Second Street. Moore set up a hotel on the northwest corner of the King's Highway and Union streets (Cornerstone Bank and the Wawa now occupy opposite corners there). Given Moore's extensive property ownership, the name Moorestown gradually replaced Chester informally in the center of town. Finally, Moorestown formerly split off from Chester and became a Township.

The Coles Hotel, east of the corner of Main and Chester, was a stop on the stagecoach route connecting Camden with Trenton and Philadelphia. Construction of the railroad in 1867 superseded the stagecoaches and connected Mount Holly and Camden.

A tavern built in 1745 by John Cox at what is now Main and Schooley streets was taken over in 1778 during the Revolutionary War by Hessian officers retreating from Philadelphia. A nearby house called the "Hessian House" also housed officers while enlisted men camped on what is now the lawn of the Moorestown Friends School. In the years after the war the tavern was used for as a town hall until 1812, when what is now called "Old Town Hall" was constructed further down the road.

A house constructed in 1742 by John Cowperthwaite at King's Highway and Lenola Road is listed in the Library of Congress with details of the house recorded in 1937 by the Historic American Buildings Survey of the United States Department of the Interior.

Quakers built Moorestown's first two schools in 1785. A brick schoolhouse was located near what is now the intersection of Route 73 and the Kings Highway overpass. A stone schoolhouse was located adjacent to the present Friends Meeting House at the intersection of Chester Avenue and Main Street. The first district school was opened in 1810. The first free Moorestown public school was established in 1873.

On October 28, 1962 operators at the Moorestown US Air Force radar facility, which is now the site of the USS Rancocas, part of the Falling Leaves network reported to NORAD that a nuclear missile had been launched from Cuba towards Florida. After the expected impact came and went without a nuclear detonation it was found that a test tape simulating a launch coincidentally lined up with a satellite passing overhead, causing the false alarm.

Vernon Hill's 46,000 square feet (4,300 m^{2}) mansion Villa Collina—Italian for "Hill House"—the largest private residence in New Jersey, is located in Moorestown.

Moorestown's Quaker heritage is discussed in Moorestown resident and native historian William H. Kingston's book, Moorestown's Third Century: The Quaker Legacy.

== Geography ==
According to the U.S. Census Bureau, the township had a total area of 14.94 square miles (38.70 km^{2}), including 14.73 square miles (38.15 km^{2}) of land and 0.21 square miles (0.55 km^{2}) of water (1.43%).

The township is located in southwest Burlington County and borders Maple Shade to the south, Cinnaminson, and Delran to the west, Willingboro on the north and Mount Laurel to the east. Moorestown is approximately 10 miles (16 km) east of Philadelphia.

Moorestown-Lenola is an unincorporated community and census-designated place located within Moorestown, which had a 2020 population of 14,240.

Other unincorporated communities, localities and place names located partially or completely within the township include Bortons Landing, North Bend, Stanwick and West Moorestown.

=== Climate ===
The climate in the Moorestown area is characterized by hot, humid summers and generally mild to cooler winters. According to the Köppen Climate Classification system, Moorestown has a humid subtropical climate, abbreviated "Cfa" on climate maps.

== Demographics ==
Historical population
Census	Pop.	Note	%±
1930	7,247		—
1940	7,749		6.9%
1950	9,123		17.7%
1960	12,497		37.0%
1970	15,577		24.6%
1980	15,596		0.1%
1990	16,116		3.3%
2000	19,017		18.0%
2010	20,726		9.0%
2020	21,355		3.0%
2023 (est.)	21,577		1.0%
Population sources: 1930–2000 1930; 1940–2000 2000; 2010 2020

=== 2020 census ===
Moorestown township, New Jersey – Racial and ethnic composition Note: the US Census treats Hispanic/Latino as an ethnic category. This table excludes Latinos from the racial categories and assigns them to a separate category. Hispanics/Latinos may be of any race.
Race / Ethnicity (NH = Non-Hispanic)	Pop 2000	Pop 2010	Pop 2020	% 2000	% 2010	% 2020
White alone (NH)	16,742	17,045	16,104	88.04%	82.24%	75.41%
Black or African American alone (NH)	1,056	1,278	1,171	5.55%	6.17%	5.48%
Native American or Alaska Native alone (NH)	24	14	20	0.13%	0.07%	0.09%
Asian alone (NH)	617	1,229	2,068	3.24%	5.93%	9.68%
Pacific Islander alone (NH)	1	4	0	0.01%	0.02%	0.00%
Other Race alone (NH)	23	41	94	0.12%	0.20%	0.44%
Mixed race or Multiracial (NH)	222	394	895	1.17%	1.90%	4.19%
Hispanic or Latino (any race)	332	721	1,003	1.75%	3.48%	4.70%
Total	19,017	20,726	21,355	100.00%	100.00%	100.00%

=== 2010 census ===
The 2010 United States census counted 20,726 people, 7,450 households, and 5,625 families in the township. The population density was 1,410.6 per square mile (544.6/km^{2}). There were 7,862 housing units at an average density of 535.1 per square mile (206.6/km^{2}). The racial makeup was 84.50% (17,513) White, 6.42% (1,331) Black or African American, 0.09% (18) Native American, 6.00% (1,244) Asian, 0.02% (5) Pacific Islander, 0.81% (168) from other races, and 2.16% (447) from two or more races. Hispanic or Latino of any race were 3.48% (721) of the population.

Of the 7,450 households, 38.1% had children under the age of 18; 61.7% were married couples living together; 10.9% had a female householder with no husband present and 24.5% were non-families. Of all households, 21.8% were made up of individuals and 11.8% had someone living alone who was 65 years of age or older. The average household size was 2.74 and the average family size was 3.21.

27.3% of the population were under the age of 18, 6.2% from 18 to 24, 19.0% from 25 to 44, 31.2% from 45 to 64, and 16.2% who were 65 years of age or older. The median age was 43.4 years. For every 100 females, the population had 91.0 males. For every 100 females ages 18 and older there were 86.1 males.

The Census Bureau's 2006–2010 American Community Survey showed that (in 2010 inflation-adjusted dollars) median household income was $108,655 (with a margin of error of +/− $6,347) and the median family income was $129,217 (+/− $6,334). Males had a median income of $100,266 (+/− $4,901) versus $60,057 (+/− $11,139) for females. The per capita income for the township was $58,458 (+/− $3,172). About 1.4% of families and 2.5% of the population were below the poverty line, including 3.0% of those under age 18 and 2.8% of those age 65 or over.

=== 2000 census ===
At the 2000 census, there were 19,017 people, 6,971 households, and 5,270 families residing in the township. The population density was 1,287.3 inhabitants per square mile (497.0/km^{2}). There were 7,211 housing units at an average density of 488.1 per square mile (188.5/km^{2}). The racial makeup of the township was 89.19% White, 5.69% African American, 0.16% Native American, 3.27% Asian, 0.01% Pacific Islander, 0.43% from other races, and 1.26% from two or more races. Hispanic or Latino of any race were 1.75% of the population.

There were 6,971 households, of which 37.0% had children under the age of 18 living with them, 64.3% were married couples living together, 9.2% had a female householder with no husband present, and 24.4% were non-families. 21.0% of all households were made up of individuals, and 10.7% had someone living alone who was 65 years of age or older. The average household size was 2.68 and the average family size was 3.13.

Age distribution was 27.4% under the age of 18, 4.4% from 18 to 24, 25.4% from 25 to 44, 26.3% from 45 to 64, and 16.4% who were 65 years of age or older. The median age was 41 years. For every 100 females, there were 89.4 males. For every 100 females age 18 and over, there were 84.9 males.

The median household income was $78,826, and the median family income was $94,844. Males had a median income of $74,773 versus $39,148 for females. The per capita income for the township was $42,154. About 2.4% of families and 3.4% of the population were below the poverty line, including 3.3% of those under age 18 and 3.6% of those age 65 or over.

== Economy ==
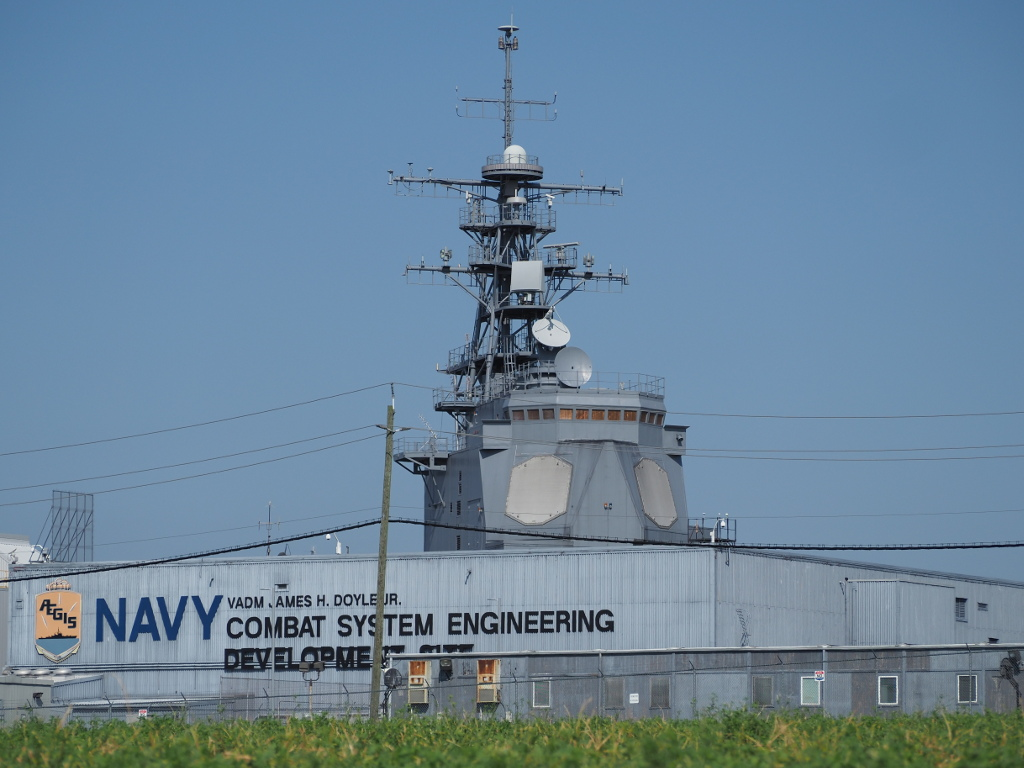
The USS Rancocas

Several notable businesses house offices and operations in Moorestown. National and international corporations with offices located in Moorestown Township include Destination Maternity, Lockheed Martin, Comcast Cable, Coca-Cola, Verizon, and the United States Navy.

The Lockheed Martin campus in Moorestown serves as a primary center for design and implementation of the Aegis Combat System as well as other radar systems. A replica superstructure of a Navy ship formally known as the USS Rancocas and nicknamed the "Cornfield Cruiser" is a mix between a Arleigh-Burke class destroyer and a never built naval strike cruiser that serves as a testbed the Aegis system.

Otis Elevator has its largest U.S. branch in Moorestown outside of the Otis Elevator headquarters located in Farmington, Connecticut.

BAYADA Home Health Care, which employs over 18,000 nursing support staff in 250 offices throughout the United States and India, has its international headquarters in Moorestown.

== Government ==
=== Local government ===
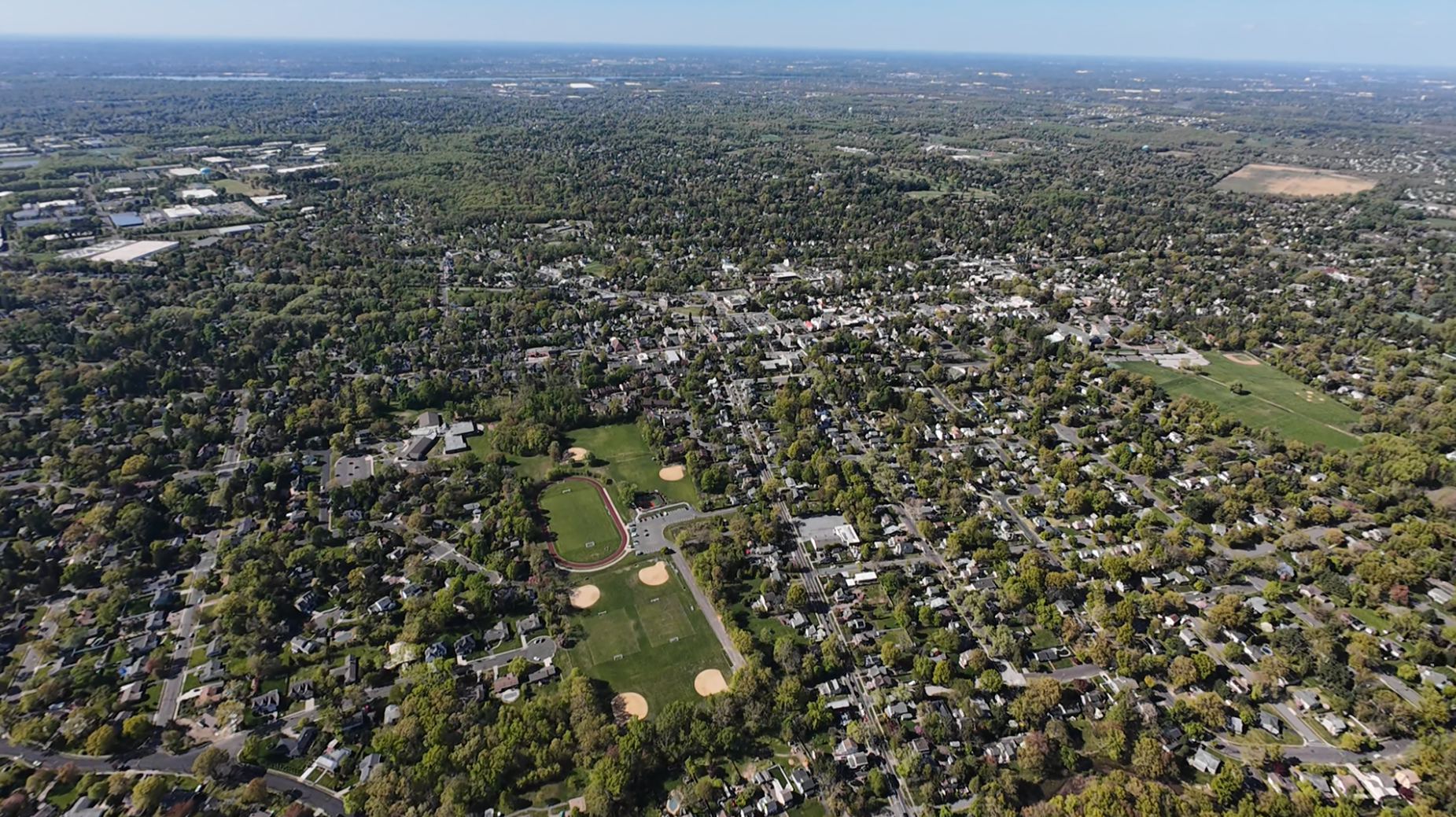
Aerial view of Moorestown's Main St. and surrounding areas

Moorestown's municipal government operates within the Faulkner Act (formally known as the Optional Municipal Charter Law) under Council-Manager plan E, which was implemented as of January 1, 1967, based on the recommendations of a Charter Study Commission. This form of government is used in 42 municipalities (of the 564) statewide. The Township Council is comprised of five members, who are elected at-large in partisan elections to four-year terms of office on a staggered basis, with either two or three seats coming up for election in even-numbered years. At a reorganization meeting held in January after each election, the council selects a mayor and a deputy mayor from among its members. The township manager, a full-time professional administrator, is appointed by the council. Under the township's administrative code and the Faulkner Act, the manager has the township's executive and administrative authority and responsibility. The township manager is Kevin Aberant.

As of 2025, the Moorestown Township Council includes Mayor Quinton Law (D, term on committee ends December 31, 2026; term as mayor ends 2025), Deputy mayor Sue Mammarella (D, term on committee ends 2028; term as deputy mayor ends 2025), James A. Barry (D, 2028), Nicole Gillespie (D, 2026) and Christopher Keating (D, 2028).

In 2004, Moorestown elected a majority Democratic council for the first time in its history. In 2008, the Moorestown Republicans won back three seats, giving them a 4–1 majority starting in 2009. On Election Day 2012, Republicans Victoria Napolitano (5,580 votes), and Phil Garwood (5,467 votes), along with Democrat J. Greg Newcomer (5,345 votes), won election to the three open seats on the township council, outpacing Republican Pete Palko (5,321 votes) and Democrats Brian Sattinger (4,899 votes) and Mark Hines (4,869 votes). Republicans maintained a 4–1 majority, and Stacey Jordan was sworn in as Moorestown's first female mayor on January 7, 2013.

During summer 2007, the township hall suffered smoke and water damage caused by an electrical fire. The township offices were temporarily located at 2 Executive Place, Moorestown Township with council meetings held during that time at the William Allen Middle School Auditorium and court sessions are conducted in Maple Shade. On December 10, 2012, Town Council members John Button, Greg Gallo, Stacey Jordan, Chris Chiacchio, and Mike Testa, along with Councilmembers-elect Victoria Napolitano and Greg Newcomer, broke ground on the new Town Hall, which was completed in 2014

In the 2014 elections, Stacey Jordan was re-elected to council along with her Republican running mate, Manny Delgado, who made history by becoming Moorestown's first Hispanic Councilman when he took office in January 2015. During the same reorganization meeting, Victoria Napolitano became Moorestown's youngest mayor ever at the age of 26, and may also be the youngest female to ever hold the office of mayor statewide.

In December 2015, the township council selected Lisa Petriello from three candidates nominated by the Democratic municipal committee to fill the seat expiring in 2016 that was vacated by Greg Newcomer when he left office the previous month.

In November 2016, Republican incumbent Victoria Napolitano won re-election along with her Republican running mate Mike Locatell and Democrat Lisa Petriello, continuing the Republican Party's 4-to-1 majority. At the township's January 2017 reorganization meeting, Manny Delgado was elected by his peers as Moorestown's first Hispanic mayor.

In 2018, the township had an average property tax bill of $11,241, the highest in the county, compared to an average bill of $8,767 statewide. That year, Democrats Nicole Gillespie and Brian Donnelly defeated Republican incumbent Manny Delgado and Jamie Boren, giving Democrats control of council for the second time in history. At the council's reorganization meeting in January, 2019 Lisa Petriello was elected by her peers as mayor, with Nicole Gillespie serving as deputy mayor.

In January 2020, Nicole Gillespie was elected mayor and Brian Donnelly as deputy mayor. On November 3, 2020 Democrats Sue Mammarella, Dave Zipin and Jake VanDyken made history by defeating three Republican opponents to give Democrats the first ever 5-0 majority on Moorestown council beginning in January, 2021.

In January 2021, the Township Council unanimously elected Nicole Gillespie as mayor for a 2-year term, Sue Mammarella as deputy mayor, and selected Quinton Law to fill the seat expiring in December 2022 that had been held by Brian Donnelly until he resigned from office. The appointment made Law the youngest and the first Black councilmember in township history. Law served on an interim basis until the November 2021 general election, when he was elected to serve the balance of the term of office.

In January 2022, Nicole Gillespie was re-elected to a second term on council and Quinton Law was elected to a full term, retaining the Democrats' 5-0 majority. In January 2023, Nicole Gillespie and Quinton Law were unanimously elected as mayor and deputy mayor by their peers. In December 2023, Jake Van Dyken resigned from the Moorestown council for personal reasons, and the remaining councilmembers unanimously appointed Christopher Keating to fill the unexpired term until December 2024.

=== Federal, state, and county representation ===
Moorestown is located in the 3rd Congressional District and is part of New Jersey's 7th state legislative district.

For the 119th United States Congress, New Jersey's 3rd congressional district is currently represented Herb Conaway (D, Delran Township). New Jersey is represented in the United States Senate by Democrats Cory Booker (Newark, term ends 2027) and Andy Kim (Moorestown, term ends 2031).

For the 2026–2027 session, the 7th legislative district of the New Jersey Legislature is represented in the State Senate by Troy Singleton (D, Palmyra) and in the General Assembly by Carol A. Murphy (D, Mount Laurel) and Balvir Singh (D, Burlington Township).

Burlington County is governed by a Board of County Commissioners comprised of five members who are chosen at-large in partisan elections to serve three-year terms of office on a staggered basis, with either one or two seats coming up for election each year; at an annual reorganization meeting, the board selects a director and deputy director from among its members to serve a one-year term. As of 2026, Burlington County's Commissioners are: Director Felicia Hopson (D, Willingboro Township, term as commissioner ends December 31, 2027; term as director ends 2026), Deputy Director Allison Eckel (D, Medford, term as commissioner ends 2028; term as deputy director ends 2026), Randy Brolo (D, Lumberton, 2026; elected to an unexpired term), Tyler Burrell (D, Delran Township, 2027) and Tom Pullion (D, Edgewater Park, 2026).

Burlington County's constitutional officers are Clerk Joanne Schwartz (D, Southampton Township, 2028), Sheriff James H. Kostoplis (D, Bordentown, 2028) and Surrogate Brian J. Carlin (D, Burlington Township, 2026).

=== Politics ===
United States presidential election results for Moorestown Township 2024 2020 2016 2012 2008 2004
Year	Republican		Democratic		Third party(ies)	
Year	No.	%	No.	%	No.	%
2024	4,730	38.46%	7,365	59.88%	204	1.66%
2020	5,204	37.75%	8,393	60.88%	189	1.37%
2016	4,659	39.99%	6,543	56.16%	449	3.85%
2012	5,656	48.98%	5,789	50.13%	102	0.88%
2008	5,435	46.72%	6,099	52.43%	98	0.84%
2004	5,792	50.66%	5,576	48.77%	66	0.58%

As of March 2011, there were a total of 13,978 registered voters in Moorestown Township, of which 3,955 (28.3% vs. 33.3% countywide) were registered as Democrats, 5,126 (36.7% vs. 23.9%) were registered as Republicans and 4,887 (35.0% vs. 42.8%) were registered as Unaffiliated. There were 10 voters registered as Libertarians or Greens. Among the township's 2010 Census population, 67.4% (vs. 61.7% in Burlington County) were registered to vote, including 92.8% of those ages 18 and over (vs. 80.3% countywide).

In the 2012 presidential election, Democrat Barack Obama received 5,789 votes (50.1% vs. 58.5% countywide), ahead of Republican Mitt Romney with 5,656 votes (49% vs. 40.5%) and other candidates with 102 votes (0.9% vs. 1.0%), among the 11,623 ballots cast by the township's 14,801 registered voters, for a turnout of 78.5% (vs. 74.5% in Burlington County). In the 2008 presidential election, Democrat Barack Obama received 6,099 votes (51.9% vs. 58.4% countywide), ahead of Republican John McCain with 5,435 votes (46.3% vs. 39.9%) and other candidates with 98 votes (0.8% vs. 1.0%), among the 11,746 ballots cast by the township's 14,274 registered voters, for a turnout of 82.3% (vs. 80.0% in Burlington County). In the 2004 presidential election, Republican George W. Bush received 5,792 votes (50.4% vs. 46.0% countywide), ahead of Democrat John Kerry with 5,576 votes (48.6% vs. 52.9%) and other candidates with 66 votes (0.6% vs. 0.8%), among the 11,482 ballots cast by the township's 13,714 registered voters, for a turnout of 83.7% (vs. 78.8% in the whole county).

Gubernatorial election results for Moorestown
Year	Republican		Democratic		Third party(ies)	
Year	No.	%	No.	%	No.	%
2025	4,146	39.62%	6,286	60.07%	33	0.32%
2021	3,977	44.84%	4,854	54.73%	38	0.43%
2017	2,960	43.75%	3,708	54.80%	98	1.45%
2013	4,683	67.25%	2,210	31.73%	71	1.02%
2009	4,128	53.67%	3,166	41.16%	398	5.17%
2005	3,781	52.18%	3,286	45.35%	179	2.47%

In the 2013 gubernatorial election, Republican Chris Christie received 4,683 votes (66.4% vs. 61.4% countywide), ahead of Democrat Barbara Buono with 2,210 votes (31.3% vs. 35.8%) and other candidates with 71 votes (1.0% vs. 1.2%), among the 7,058 ballots cast by the township's 14,925 registered voters, yielding a 47.3% turnout (vs. 44.5% in the county). In the 2009 gubernatorial election, Republican Chris Christie received 4,128 votes (53.4% vs. 47.7% countywide), ahead of Democrat Jon Corzine with 3,166 votes (40.9% vs. 44.5%), Independent Chris Daggett with 345 votes (4.5% vs. 4.8%) and other candidates with 53 votes (0.7% vs. 1.2%), among the 7,736 ballots cast by the township's 14,206 registered voters, yielding a 54.5% turnout (vs. 44.9% in the county).

United States Senate election results for Moorestown1
Year	Republican		Democratic		Third party(ies)	
Year	No.	%	No.	%	No.	%
2024	4,550	37.41%	7,474	61.46%	137	1.13%
2018	4,813	45.08%	5,438	50.94%	425	3.98%
2012	5,473	49.39%	5,528	49.89%	80	0.72%
2006	4,097	52.78%	3,580	46.12%	86	1.11%

United States Senate election results for Moorestown2
Year	Republican		Democratic		Third party(ies)	
Year	No.	%	No.	%	No.	%
2020	5,626	41.20%	7,920	58.00%	108	0.79%
2014	3,476	50.27%	3,363	48.64%	75	1.08%
2013	2,104	47.31%	2,314	52.04%	29	0.65%
2008	5,748	52.93%	5,017	46.20%	94	0.87%

== Historic district ==
- Moorestown Historic District
- U.S. National Register of Historic Places
- U.S. Historic district
- New Jersey Register of Historic Places
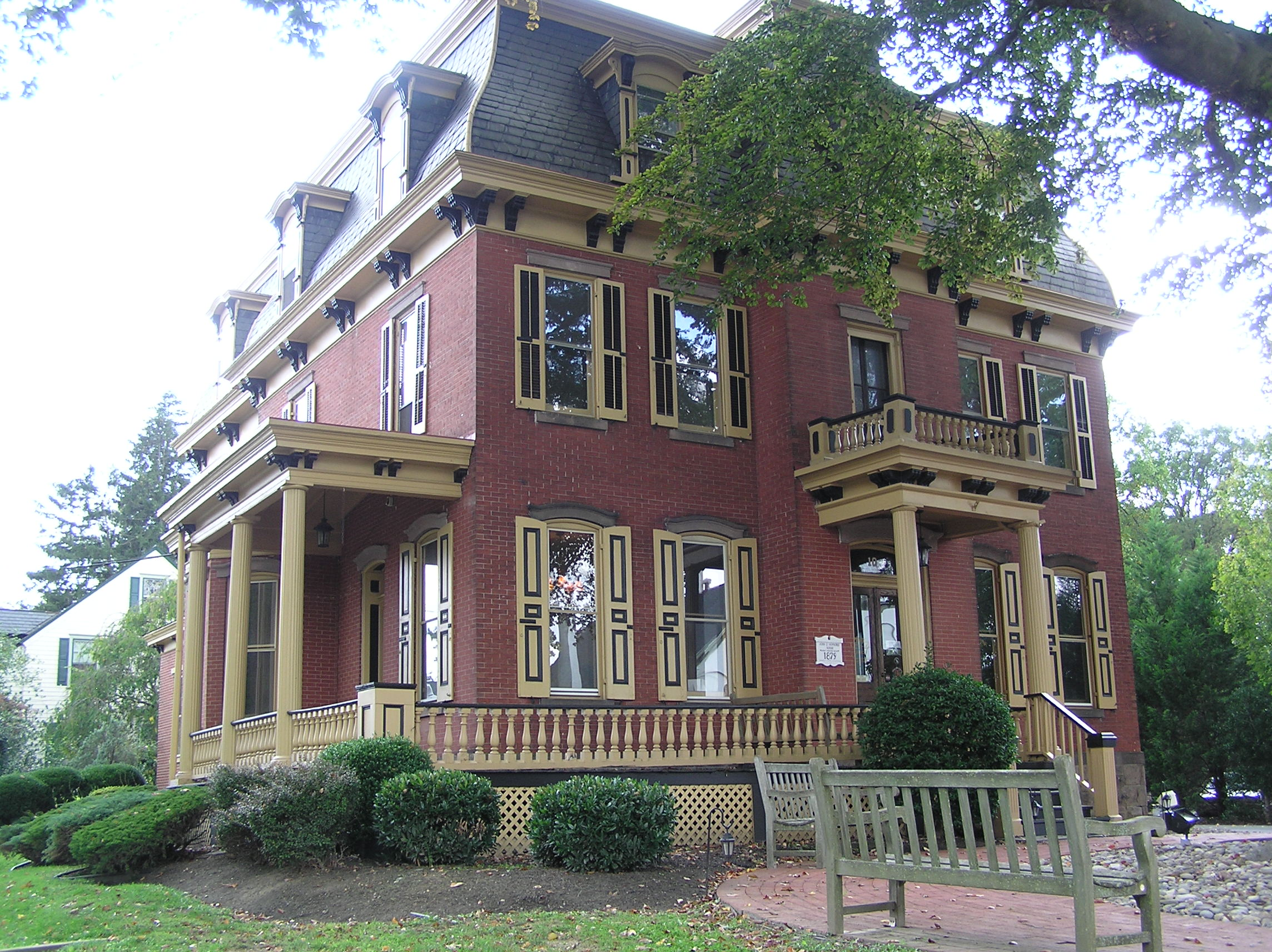
- John C. Hopkins House
- Location: Roughly bounded by Maple Avenue, Chestnust Avenue, Main Street from Zelley Avenue to Locust Street, and Mill Street
- Area: 47 acres (19 ha)
- Built: 1682
- Architectural style: Mid 19th Century Revival, Late 19th And 20th Century Revivals, Late Victorian
- NRHP reference No.: 89002295
- NJRHP No.: 836

Significant dates
- Added to NRHP: August 30, 1990
- Designated NJRHP: November 28, 1989

The Moorestown Historic District is a 47-acre (19 ha) historic district encompassing the community. It was added to the National Register of Historic Places on August 30, 1990, for its significance in architecture, commerce, community development, and exploration/settlement from 1720 to 1940. The district includes 351 contributing buildings and four contributing sites. Breidenhart, Moorestown Friends School and Meetinghouse, Smith Mansion, and Town Hall, which were previously listed individually on the NRHP, contribute to the district.

== Education ==
The Moorestown Township Public Schools serves students in pre-kindergarten through twelfth grade. As of the 2022–23 school year, the district, comprised of six schools, had an enrollment of 3,884 students and 345.5 classroom teachers (on an FTE basis), for a student–teacher ratio of 11.2:1. Schools in the district (with 2022–23 enrollment data from the National Center for Education Statistics) are George C. Baker Elementary School with 397 students in grades PreK-3, Mary E. Roberts Elementary School with 313 students in grades PreK-3, South Valley Elementary School with 392 students in grades PreK-3, Moorestown Upper Elementary School with 853 students in grades 4-6, William Allen Middle School with 616 students in grades 7-8 and Moorestown High School with 1,267 students in grades 9-12.

Students from Moorestown, and from all of Burlington County, are eligible to attend the Burlington County Institute of Technology, a countywide public school district that serves the vocational and technical education needs of students at the high school and post-secondary level at its campuses in Medford and Westampton.

Moorestown Friends School is a private Quaker school located at East Main Street and Chester Avenue. The school serves approximately 700 students from preschool through twelfth grade.

Our Lady of Good Counsel School, which operates under the auspices of the Roman Catholic Diocese of Trenton, is attached to Our Lady of Good Counsel Parish; located behind the church on Prospect Avenue, it was founded in 1927 and has about 480 students from nursery through eighth grade. In 2015, the school was one of 15 schools in New Jersey, and one of six private schools, recognized as a National Blue Ribbon School in the exemplary high performing category by the United States Department of Education.

Additionally there are students from Moorestown who attend Resurrection Catholic School in Cherry Hill. This school is under the Roman Catholic Diocese of Camden.

== Transportation ==
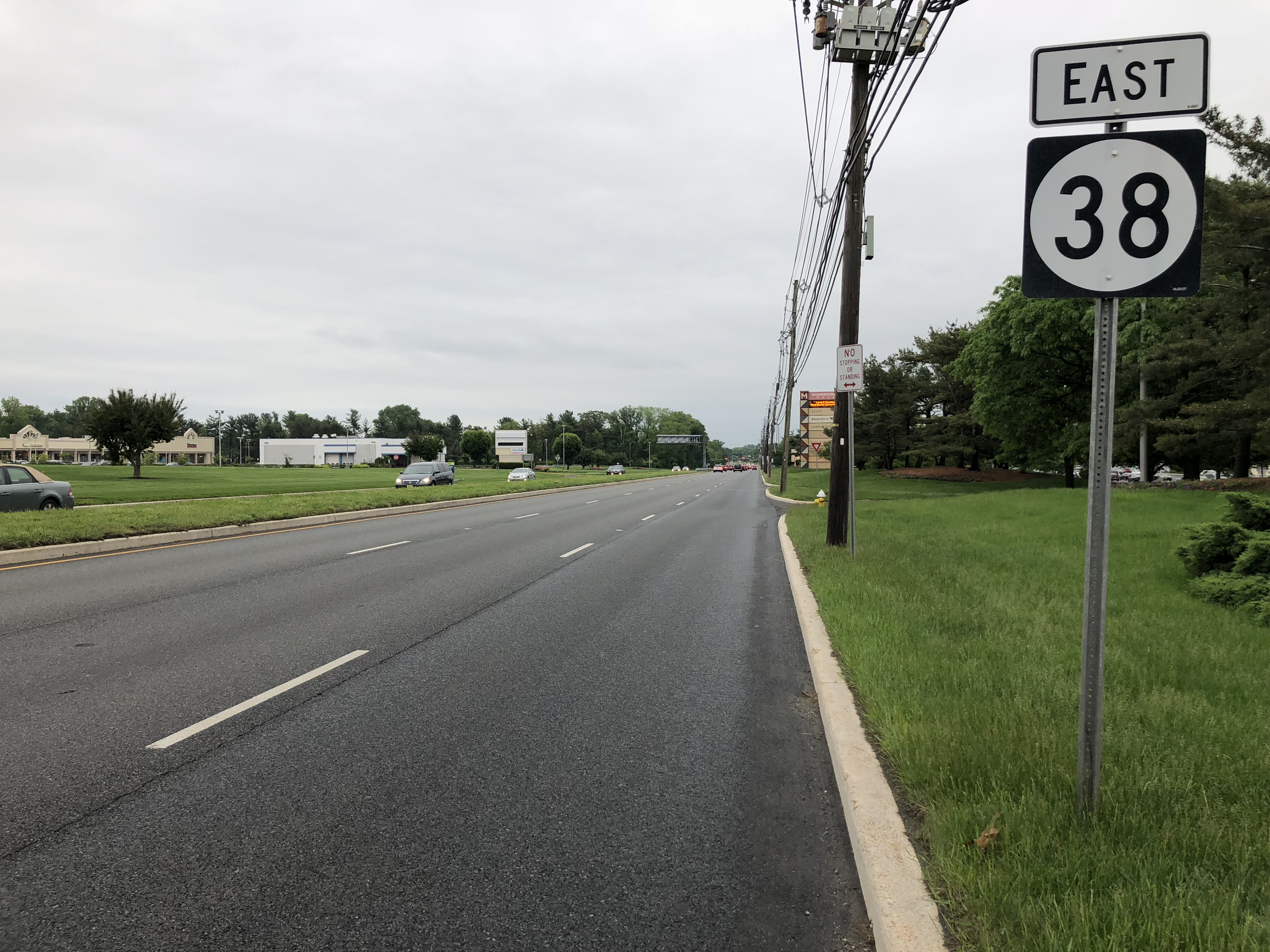
Route 38 in Moorestown

=== Roads and highways ===
As of May 2010, the township had a total of 123.52 miles (198.79 km) of roadways, of which 96.15 miles (154.74 km) were maintained by the municipality, 24.65 miles (39.67 km) by Burlington County and 2.72 miles (4.38 km) by the New Jersey Department of Transportation.

The most prominent highway serving Moorestown is Route 38. CR 537 also passes through the town. Both roads run east–west and parallel to each other with no intersection.

=== Public transportation ===
NJ Transit provides bus service to Philadelphia on routes 317 (from Asbury Park), and during rush hours weekdays, on the 414. Other buses such as the 407, 413 and 457 run between the Moorestown Mall and the Walter Rand Transportation Center in Camden, from which there are connecting buses into Philadelphia and a station on the PATCO Speedline with service between Center City Philadelphia and Lindenwold. Burlington County provides rush hour public transit van service on the Burlink B9 route on weekdays from the Palmyra River Line station to the Moorestown Mall and some intermediate points.

Moorestown does not have its own train station, though the original plan of the PATCO line had a station in Moorestown. Residents can drive to train stations in the nearby communities of Haddonfield and Lindenwold for access to the PATCO Speedline, and to Palmyra for NJ Transit's River Line service which connects to New York Penn Station through Trenton. NJ Transit Rail Operations still owns the single-track railway in the township, running from Pennsauken to Mount Holly, as a rail trail.

== Miracle on the Hudson ==
On June 5, 2011, J. Supor & Son transported the fuselage of US Airways Flight 1549 through Moorestown en route to the Carolinas Aviation Museum in Charlotte, North Carolina. The convoy spent over 1.5 hours working to negotiate a single right turn in the center of the town. This was the most difficult maneuver on the entire seven-day, 788-mile journey. The difficulty of this one turn was known in advance. In order to negotiate the turn the team had to temporarily remove a street light and the corner of a grave yard fence.

== Notable people ==
People who were born in, residents of, or otherwise closely associated with Moorestown Township include:

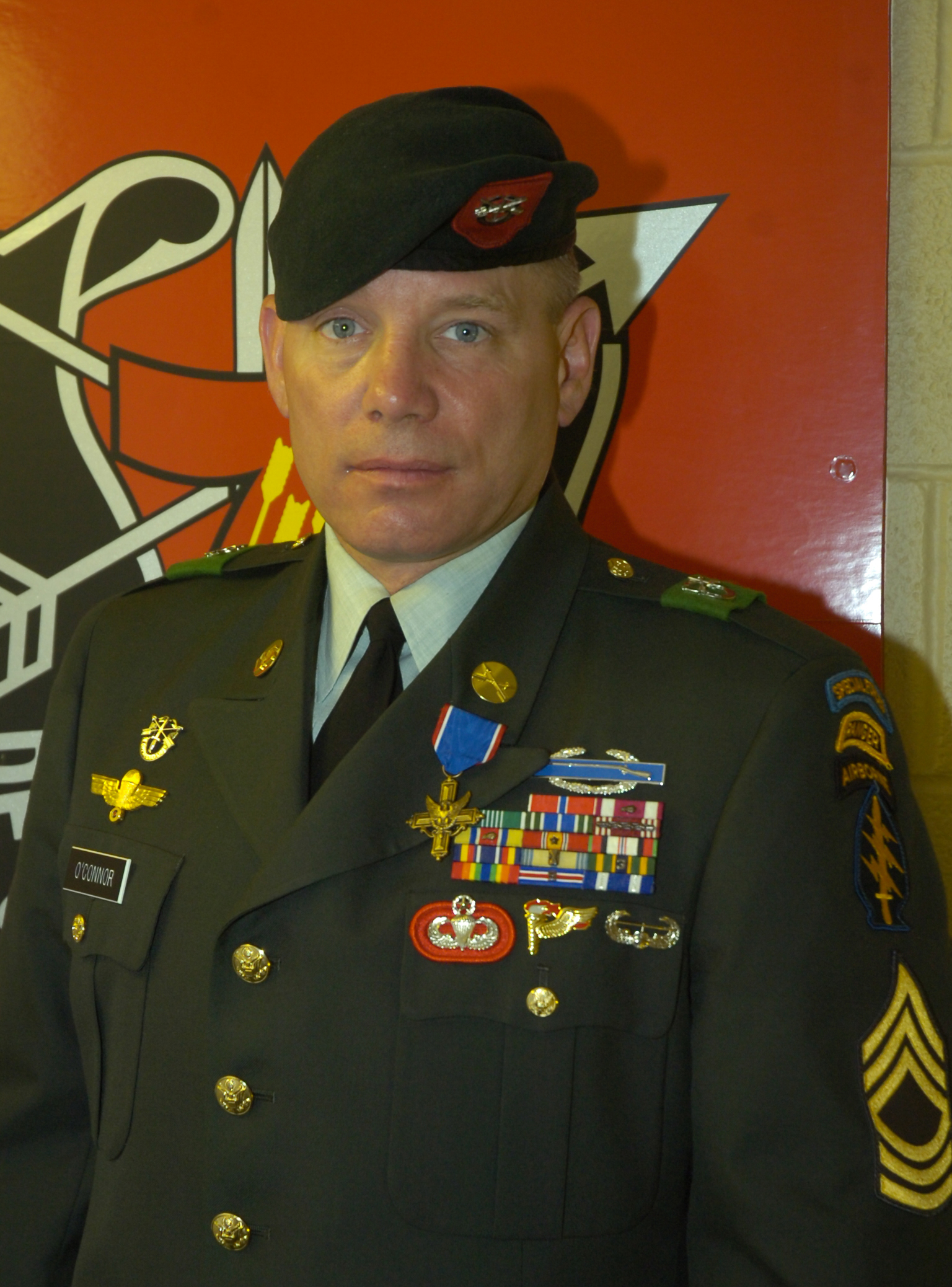
Brendan O'Connor

- Diane Allen (born 1948), represents the 7th legislative district in the New Jersey General Assembly
- Samuel Leeds Allen (1841–1918), inventor and manufacturer of farm equipment and the Flexible Flyer sled
- Mary Ellen Avery (1927–2011), pediatrician, whose research efforts helped lead to the discovery of the main cause of respiratory distress syndrome in premature babies
- Emily Bacon (1891–1972), physician who was the first pediatric specialist in Philadelphia
- Lillian Lewis Batchelor (1907–1977), librarian who was president of the American Association of School Librarians
- Sam Bishop (born 1983), professional soccer goalkeeper
- David Bispham (1857–1921), opera singer
- Francis L. Bodine (1936–2023), represented the 8th legislative district in the New Jersey General Assembly from 1994–2008
- Hugh Borton (1903–1995), Japanese studies expert who served for 10 years as president of Haverford College
- T. J. Brennan (born 1989), defenseman who played in the NHL for the Florida Panthers and Toronto Maple Leafs
- Dave Brock (born 1967), wide receivers coach for the Atlanta Falcons of the National Football League
- Lem Burnham (born 1947), former National Football League executive and player
- Kevin Chamberlin (born 1963), actor
- Bobby Clarke (born 1949), former National Hockey League player with the Philadelphia Flyers
- Gary Close (born 1957), assistant coach for the Wisconsin Badgers men's basketball team
- Josh Cody (1892–1961), member of the College Football Hall of Fame
- John S. Collins (1837–1928), developer of Miami Beach, Florida
- Herb Conaway (born 1963), politician who has served in the New Jersey General Assembly since 1998, where he represents the 7th Legislative District
- Phil Costa (born 1987), former football player with the Dallas Cowboys
- Brad Costello (born 1974), former American football punter who played for the Cincinnati Bengals of the NFL and the Scottish Claymores of NFL Europe
- Elisabeth Elliot (1926–2015), Christian author and speaker
- Colin Farrell, head coach of the University of Pennsylvania lightweight rowing team
- Dereck Faulkner (born 1985), wide receiver who played in the NFL for the Philadelphia Eagles
- Lucinda Florio (1947–2022), teacher and advocate for education and literacy, who, as the wife of former New Jersey Governor James Florio, served as the First Lady of New Jersey
- Edwin B. Forsythe (1916–1984), member of the United States House of Representatives from New Jersey who served as mayor of Moorestown from 1957–1962
- Walter French (1899–1984), football All-American and professional baseball player for the Philadelphia Athletics, 1923–1929
- Joseph H. Gaskill (1851–1935), judge on the New Jersey Court of Common Pleas and Justice of the New Jersey Supreme Court from 1893 to 1896
- John F. Gerry (1926–1995), chief United States district judge on the United States District Court for the District of New Jersey
- Chris Gheysens (born c. 1972), president and chief executive officer of Wawa Inc.
- Bill Guerin (born 1970), right winger who earned the Stanley Cup with both the New Jersey Devils and Pittsburgh Penguins
- Edward Harris (1799–1863), introduced the Percheron horse to America; benefactor of John James Audubon; lived at Smith-Cadbury Mansion
- Vernon Hill (born 1946), founder and former chairman, president, and chief executive officer of Commerce Bancorp and Commerce Bank of Cherry Hill Township, New Jersey
- Leon A. Huff (born 1942), co-founder and vice-chairman of Gamble-Huff Music, a songwriting and record production team who have written and produced 15 gold singles and 22 gold albums
- Alfred Hunt (1817–1888), first president of Bethlehem Iron Company, precursor of Bethlehem Steel Corporation
- Elisha Hunt (1779–1873), principal entrepreneur behind the company that built the historic steamboat Enterprise
- Esther Hunt (1751–1820), pioneer who lived on America's frontier as a wife, a mother and a leader in her Quaker faith
- John Hunt (1740–1824), Quaker minister and diarist
- Eldridge R. Johnson (1867–1945), founder of Victor Talking Machine Company
- Jevon Kearse (born 1976), former NFL defensive end who played for the Philadelphia Eagles and Tennessee Titans
- Tim Kerr (born 1960), former NHL right wing who played for the Philadelphia Flyers, New York Rangers and Hartford Whalers
- Andy Kim (born 1982), U.S. senator, former U.S. representative
- Ruth G. King (born 1933), educational psychologist who was the first woman to serve as president of the Association of Black Psychologists
- C. Harry Knowles (1928–2020), physicist, entrepreneur, philanthropist, and a prolific inventor who held some 400 patents and served on the Moorestown council in the 1980s
- Matt Langel (born 1977), head coach for the Colgate Raiders men's basketball team
- Jonathan V. Last (born 1974), columnist for The Weekly Standard
- Al LeConey (1901–1959), gold medal winner in the 4x100 meter relay at the 1924 Summer Olympics
- Ben Leonberg (born 1987), film director, screenwriter and producer, known for his work in the horror and fantasy genres
- Kathy Linden (born 1938), pop singer who scored hits on the U.S. Billboard Hot 100 with "Billy" and "Goodbye Jimmy, Goodbye"
- Donovan McNabb (born 1976), former professional football player for the Philadelphia Eagles
- Stephen W. Meader (1892–1977), author of more than 40 novels for boys and girls
- Peter Mishler (born 1980/81), poet and editor
- Freddie Mitchell (born 1978), former professional football player for the Philadelphia Eagles
- Victoria Napolitano (born 1988), politician who became Moorestown's youngest mayor, when she took office in 2015 at age 26
- David A. Norcross (born 1937), politician who ran for United States Senate in 1976 and served as chairman of the New Jersey Republican State Committee
- Brendan O'Connor (born c. 1960), recipient of the Distinguished Service Cross for his heroic action in Afghanistan
- Christine O'Donnell (born 1969), Republican candidate in Delaware's 2010 United States Senate special election
- Terrell Owens (born 1973), former professional football player who played for the Philadelphia Eagles and other teams
- Sal Paolantonio (born 1956), Philadelphia-based bureau reporter for ESPN
- Alice Paul (1885–1977), leader of a campaign for women's suffrage resulting in passage of the 19th Amendment to the U.S. Constitution
- Doug Pederson (born 1968), head coach of the Philadelphia Eagles of the National Football League
- Jim Picken (1903–1975), early professional basketball player
- Samuel K. Robbins (1853–1926), politician who served as Speaker of the New Jersey General Assembly and president of the New Jersey Senate
- Julie Robenhymer (born 1981), Miss New Jersey 2005
- Jeremy Roenick (born 1970), professional hockey player, former player for the Philadelphia Flyers
- Jon Runyan (born 1973), football player for the Philadelphia Eagles, Houston Oilers and San Diego Chargers, who was elected to represent New Jersey's 3rd congressional district from 2011 to 2015
- Jon Runyan Jr. (born 1997), guard in the NFL for the Green Bay Packers
- Steve Sabol (1942–2012), president and co-founder of NFL Films
- Ulf Samuelsson (born 1964), professional hockey player, former player for the Philadelphia Flyers
- Lauren Schmetterling (born 1988), rower who won a total of three gold medals in the Women's eight competition at the 2013 World Rowing Championships, the 2015 World Rowing Championships and the 2016 Summer Olympics in Rio de Janeiro
- Katherine Shindle (born 1977), Miss America 1998 and actress
- Ben Simmons (born 1996), professional basketball player for the Philadelphia 76ers
- Howard Smith (1928–2021), American-born Finnish designer, ceramicist, multidisciplinary visual artist, and educator
- Scott Terry (born 1976), songwriter and singer who has fronted the band Red Wanting Blue
- Albert W. Van Duzer (1917–1999), bishop of the Episcopal Diocese of New Jersey, serving from 1973 to 1982
- John Vanbiesbrouck (born 1963), professional hockey player, former player for the Philadelphia Flyers
- James Weinstein, transportation planner and executive who served as executive director of New Jersey Transit
- Brian Willison (born 1977), director of the Parsons Institute for Information Mapping
- Helen Van Pelt Wilson (1901–2003), garden writer
- Esther V. Yanai (1928–2003), advocate for open-space preservation in Moorestown
- Albert Young (born 1985), former football player for the University of Iowa and Minnesota Vikings
- Tim Young (born 1968), silver medal-winning rower in the quadruple sculls at the 1996 Summer Olympics
- Martha Zweig (born 1942), poet

== Moorestown in fiction ==
- The song "Moorestown" by Sun Kil Moon is set in Moorestown.

== See also ==
- National Register of Historic Places listings in Burlington County, New Jersey
