= Breidenhart =

Historic house in New Jersey, United States

- U.S. National Register of Historic Places
- U.S. Historic district – Contributing property
- New Jersey Register of Historic Places
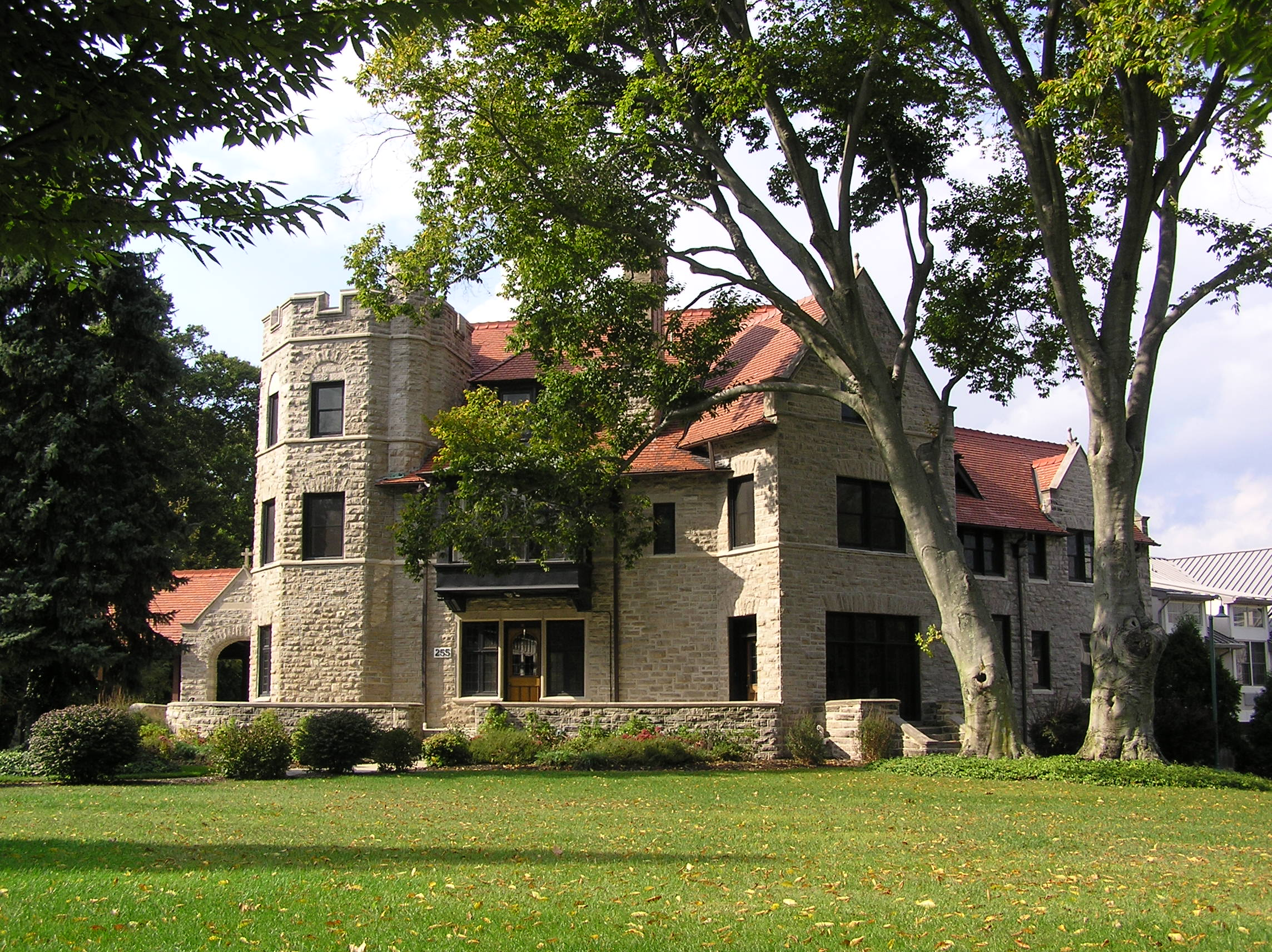

- Location within Burlington County, New Jersey Location within New Jersey Location within the United States
- Location: 255 East Main Street, Moorestown, New Jersey, U.S.
- Coordinates: 39°58′09″N 74°56′08″W
- Area: 10 acres (4.0 ha)
- Built: 1894
- Architect: Walter Smedley
- Architectural style: Queen Anne
- Part of: Moorestown Historic District (ID89002295)
- NRHP reference No.: 77000851
- NJRHP No.: 832

Significant dates
- Added to NRHP: December 22, 1977
- Designated CP: August 30, 1990
- Designated NJRHP: June 13, 1977

Breidenhart is a historic castle-like house built in 1894 by Samuel Leeds Allen and located at 255 East Main Street in Moorestown, New Jersey. It was added to the National Register of Historic Places on December 22, 1977, for its significance in art, architecture, commerce, and music. It was added as a contributing property to the Moorestown Historic District in 1990. The building is now owned by the Lutheran Social Ministries of New Jersey.

== History ==
In 1894, Samuel Leeds Allen, inventor of the Flexible Flyer sled, commissioned architect Walter Smedley to design his new residence. Allen named it Breidenhart, meaning "broad hearth stone". In 1918, after Allen's death, the house was sold to Eldridge R. Johnson, founder and president of the Victor Talking Machine Company. In 1947, after Johnson's death, it was sold to the Lutheran Home of New Jersey.

== Description ==
The house is a two and one-half story stone building featuring Queen Anne architecture and a polygonal corner turret. It is located on a 10-acre (4.0 ha) landscaped lot.

== See also ==
- National Register of Historic Places listings in Burlington County, New Jersey
