= USS Rancocas =

Naval engineering facility

Coordinates: 39°58′49.2″N 74°54′04.4″W

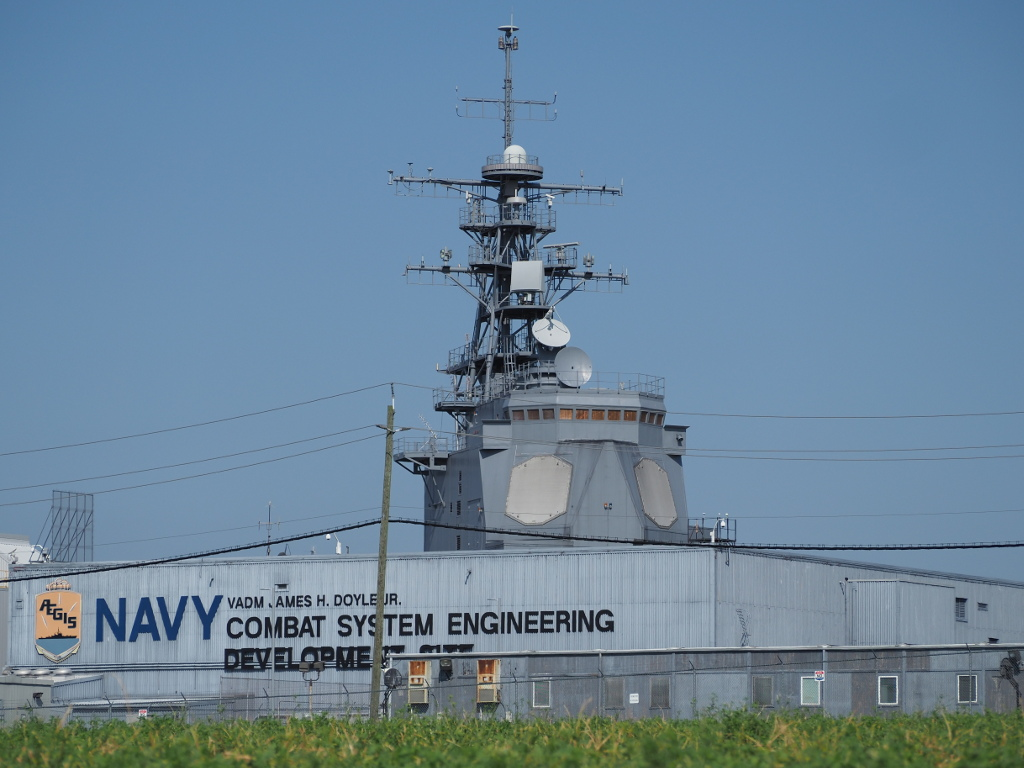
Vice Admiral James H. Doyle, Jr. Combat System Engineering Development Site

USS Rancocas (LS-1) is the former name of an engineering development facility at the border between Moorestown Township and Mount Laurel Township, New Jersey. In May 2008, it was formally renamed the Vice Admiral James H. Doyle, Jr. Combat System Engineering Development Site (CSEDS).

It is located between Hartford Road and County Route 537 in Moorestown and resembles a warehouse with the superstructure of a planned, but never built naval strike cruiser sitting on the roof. The design of the superstructure was later incorporated into the design of the Arleigh Burke-class destroyer. The facility was initially constructed for the United States Air Force in 1958, to support AN/FPS-49 Ballistic Missile Early Warning System development. It briefly operated as a sensor for the SPACETRACK program but was transferred to the U.S. Navy and refurbished in 1976 to support Aegis Combat System development. It is still used by Lockheed Martin for Aegis research and development, and houses not only Navy and Lockheed Martin personnel, but personnel from numerous subcontractors, such as Mission Solutions Engineering and Northrop Grumman. The New Jersey Historic Preservation Office has declared the Vice Admiral James H. Doyle, Jr. Combat System Engineering Development Site eligible for listing in the New Jersey Register of Historic Places.

Formally commissioned in 1977, it is a Navy-owned building, staffed by Navy personnel attached to Aegis Technical Representative (AEGIS TECHREP), which is an Echelon 3 field activity under Naval Sea Systems Command (NAVSEA).

Because the facility is plainly visible from Interstate 295 and the New Jersey Turnpike, it has become something of a landmark for local residents and travelers. Area residents frequently refer to it as the "Cornfield Cruiser" or "Cruiser in a Cornfield."

An AN/SPY-1 antenna array damaged in the USS Cole bombing was later refurbished and installed in CSEDS.

Naval Facilities Engineering Command completed a large extension to the original building in early 2015.

In 2020, an AN/SPY-6(V)1 array was installed at the Combat System Engineering Development Site to support testing.
