= Eldridge R. Johnson =

American businessman and inventor (1867-1945)

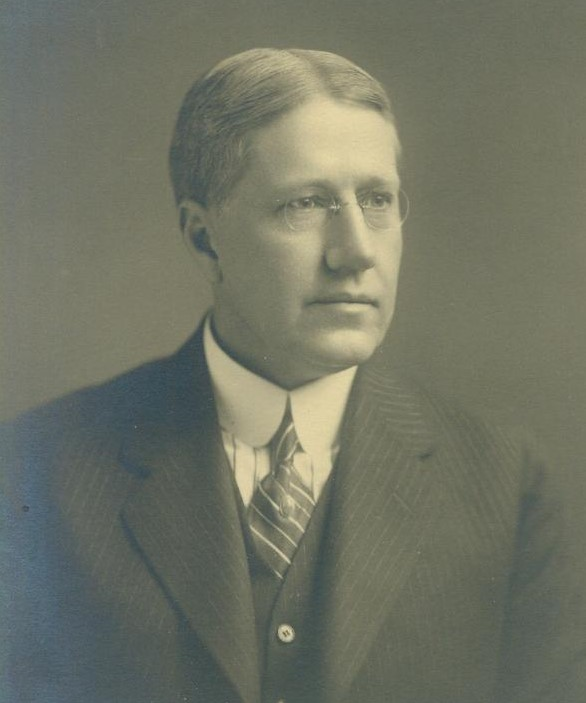
- Born: Eldridge Reeves Johnson; February 6, 1867; Wilmington, Delaware, U.S.
- Died: November 14, 1945 (aged 78); Moorestown, New Jersey, U.S.
- Burial place: West Laurel Hill Cemetery, Bala Cynwyd, Pennsylvania, U.S.
- Spouse: Elsie Reeves Fenimore Johnson
- Children: Eldridge Reeves Fenimore "Fen" Johnson
- Parents: Asa S. Johnson; Caroline Reeves Johnson

Eldridge Reeves Johnson (February 6, 1867 – November 14, 1945) was an American businessman and inventor who founded the Victor Talking Machine Company in 1901 through a merger of his Consolidated Talking Machine Company and the Berliner Gramophone Company. In 1926, Johnson sold Victor to two banking firms for US$40 million; in 1929, Victor was purchased by the Radio Corporation of America and became known as RCA Victor.

He founded the Eldridge R. Johnson Manufacturing Company in 1894 and developed a spring driven motor for the Berliner Gramophone. He improved the quality of phonograph records with the vertical cut recording method. He co-founded the Consolidated Talking Machine Company along with Leon Douglass in 1900.

He received 76 patents for his inventions over the course of his career. He won a gold medal for his products at the Pan-American Exposition. He received a Grammy Trustees Award posthumously in 1985 for significant contributions to the field of recording.

The Eldridge R. Johnson Park in Camden, New Jersey, and the Eldridge R. Johnson Foundation at the University of Pennsylvania are named in his honor. The Johnson Victrola Museum in Dover, Delaware, was established to honor Johnson and highlight his accomplishments.

== Early life and education ==
Johnson was born February 6, 1867, in Wilmington, Delaware, to Caroline Reeves Johnson and Asa S. Johnson. His mother died in 1869 and he was sent to live with his aunt and uncle near Smyrna, Delaware. He eventually moved back in with his father after he remarried. Johnson attended the Dover Academy with the hopes of attending college, but he was a poor student and upon his graduation in 1882 at age fifteen, the Academy's director told him, "You are too God damned dumb to go to college. Go and learn a trade." He took classes in engineering and mechanical drawing at the Spring Garden Institute.

== Career ==
In 1883 Johnson was apprenticed to J. Lodge & Son, a machine repair shop in Philadelphia. In 1888, his apprenticeship was completed and Johnson began working at the Scull Machine Shop in Camden, New Jersey. The son of the owner of the machine shop died suddenly and Johnson took over as foreman and manager. He resigned from Scull Machine Shop and lived in Washington State for a year. He decided that opportunities were greater for a young mechanic in the East and returned to Philadelphia in 1891.

=== Eldridge R. Johnson Manufacturing Company ===
Johnson returned to the Scull Machine Shop and took a financial investment in the business. The firm developed book binders and wire stitchers but struggled and Johnson bought out his partner's share to became sole owner. In 1894, he changed the name of the business to the Eldridge R. Johnson Manufacturing Company. His business executed a variety of smaller jobs involving steam models and machine alterations. A customer named Henry Whitaker brought a manually driven, hand-cranked Berliner Gramophone into Johnson's shop and asked him to design a spring driven motor for it. Johnson did so, but Whitaker found the result unsatisfactory and rejected the design.

Johnson was captivated by the Gramophone and saw great potential in its improvement. He later wrote that “the little instrument was badly designed. It sounded much like a partially educated parrot with a sore throat and a cold in the head. But the little wheezy instrument caught my attention and held it fast and hard. I became interested in it as I had never been interested before in anything. It was exactly what I was looking for.”

The Berliner Gramophone Company realized they needed a spring driven motor to keep up with competitors. Johnson was approached by representatives from the Berliner Gramophone Company to develop a motor that would play records at a consistent speed. He designed and built a spring driven motor for the gramophone and improved the sound box. In 1896, he signed a contract with Berliner to provide 200 motors for the gramophone. Johnson received a patent in 1898 for "Gramophone and Actuating Device Therefor".

Johnson continued to refine the gramophone and collaborated with Alfred Clark to further improve the soundbox. They applied for a patent together and agreed they would split the profits from sales equally and not sell their shares without the consent of the other. Johnson also conducted research on how to improve the recording quality of phonograph records and devised a technique to improve the lateral cut method used to what he called the "hill and dale" or vertical cut recording.

The Zonophone Company also released their version of the gramophone which Johnson believed violated his patent. Zonophone was also sued for patent infringement by the Gramophone Company. Zonophone settled the patent infringement case and obtained an injection against the Berliner Gramophone Company which essentially blocked Johnson from selling Gramophones in the United States.

=== Consolidated Talking Machine Company ===
Johnson had invested $50,000 to $60,000 for construction of a manufacturing plant in anticipation of increased business. In August 1900, he co-founded the Consolidated Talking Machine Company along with Leon Douglass. In September, print advertisements for Consolidated featured the first appearance of the "His Master's Voice" trademark in the United States.

He was quickly sued by Zonophone who attempted to tie Johnson to the Berliner Gramophone injunction and prevent him from referring to his device as a Gramophone. On March 1, 1901, the injunction was denied but Johnson was temporarily prevented from using variations on the word ‘gramophone’. Though this decision was soon reversed, Johnson chose not to refer to his talking machine as a 'gramophone'.

=== Victor Talking Machine Company ===
The Victor Talking Machine Company was created through the merger of the Consolidated Talking Machine Company and the Berliner Gramophone Company. Johnson served as president and Leon Douglass as vice-president. By 1910, the manufacturing plant for the company encompassed 12 blocks in Camden, New Jersey. Eldridge Johnson disliked the pressures of big business and had never intended on becoming an industrial magnate. As early as 1901, he offered his entire business to Berliner, who was unable, or unwilling to purchase his interests. In 1924, Johnson suffered a nervous breakdown and for several months was unable to make any decisions regarding Victor's affairs. The popularity of radio reduced the phonograph record industry and was one of several factors which brought the vast Victor Talking Machine Company to the brink of bankruptcy in 1925. After the company successfully rebounded from this debacle, Johnson, began to seriously consider selling Victor and retiring from the phonograph business. In 1926, after years of turning down several lucrative offers, Johnson sold the Victor Talking Machine Company for $40 million to a New York syndicate which, in turn, sold Victor to the Radio Corporation of America (RCA) in 1929.

He received 76 patents for his inventions over the course of his career. Johnson was elected to the American Philosophical Society in 1928. He was a member of the Academy of Natural Sciences, the Art Club of Philadelphia, the Pennsylvania Academy of Fine Arts, the Pennsylvania Historical Society, and the Union League of Philadelphia.

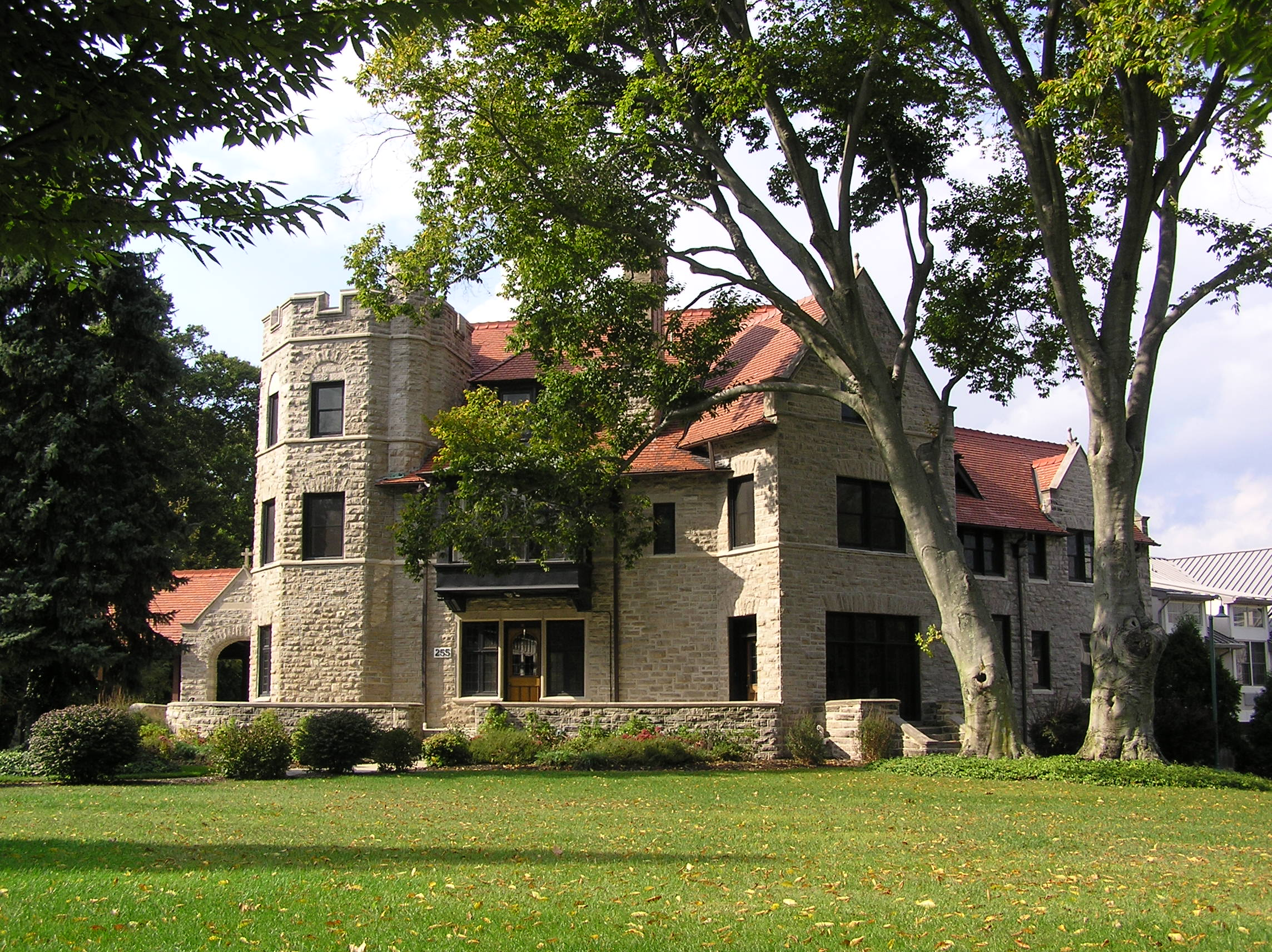
Breidenhart

Johnson died at the age of 78 on November 14, 1945, in Breidenhart, his home at Moorestown Township, New Jersey, after suffering a stroke days earlier. Johnson was interred at West Laurel Hill Cemetery in Bala Cynwyd, Pennsylvania.

== Personal life ==
In 1897, he married to Elise R. Fenimore Johnson and together they had a son E.R. Fenimore Johnson. They lived in North Philadelphia, and in 1903 moved to a mansion in Merion Station, Pennsylvania. In 1919, the family moved to Moorestown, New Jersey. He had a summer home in Ventnor, New Jersey, and a house in Pinehurst, North Carolina.

He was a trustee of the University of Pennsylvania and served as chairman of the University of Pennsylvania museum. He used his private yacht, Caroline II for an archeological expedition to Easter Island. He led another expedition to Piedras Negras, Guatemala, to discover the missing heads of figures found earlier. He brought back a throne which was donated to the University of Pennsylvania museum. He purchased the original manuscript for Alice in Wonderland from A. S. W. Rosenbach for $150,000.

== Legacy ==
Johnson donated the Cooper Library and surrounding land to the city of Camden, New Jersey for use as Eldridge R. Johnson Park.

In 1927, he donated $800,000 to the University of Pennsylvania to establish the Eldridge R. Johnson Foundation for research on medical physics.

On February 26, 1985, Johnson posthumously received a Grammy Award Trustees Award for significant contributions in the field of recording.

The Johnson Victrola Museum was established in Dover, Delaware, in honor of Johnson and contains phonographs, memorabilia, photographs, and his Grammy award.

== Patents ==
- U.S. patent 496,314, Wire stitching machine, 1893
- U.S. patent 597,773, Stapling machine, 1898
- U.S. patent 601,198, Gramophone and actuating device therefor, 1898
- U.S. patent 634,944, Sound recording and reproducing machine, 1899
- U.S. patent 650,843, Sound recording and reproducing machine, 1900
- U.S. patent 651,076, Gramophone, 1900
- U.S. patent 655,556, Sound recording and reproducing machine, 1900
- U.S. patent 655,557, Sound recording and reproducing machine, 1900
- U.S. patent 675,331, Sound recording and reproducing machine, 1901
- U.S. patent 675,332, Sound recording and reproducing machine, 1901
- U.S. patent 681,918, Machine for leading sound records, 1901
- U.S. patent 689,884, Spring motor, 1901
- U.S. patent 689,885, Governor for spring motors, 1901
- U.S. patent 679,896, Sound box for talking machine, 1901
- U.S. patent 781,429, Sound recording and reproducing machine, 1905
- U.S. patent 896,059 Record for talking machines,1908
- U.S. patent 1,165,414 Talking machine, 1915
- U.S. patent 1,235,695 Talking machine, 1918
