= Samuel Leeds Allen =

American farmer, inventor and manufacturer

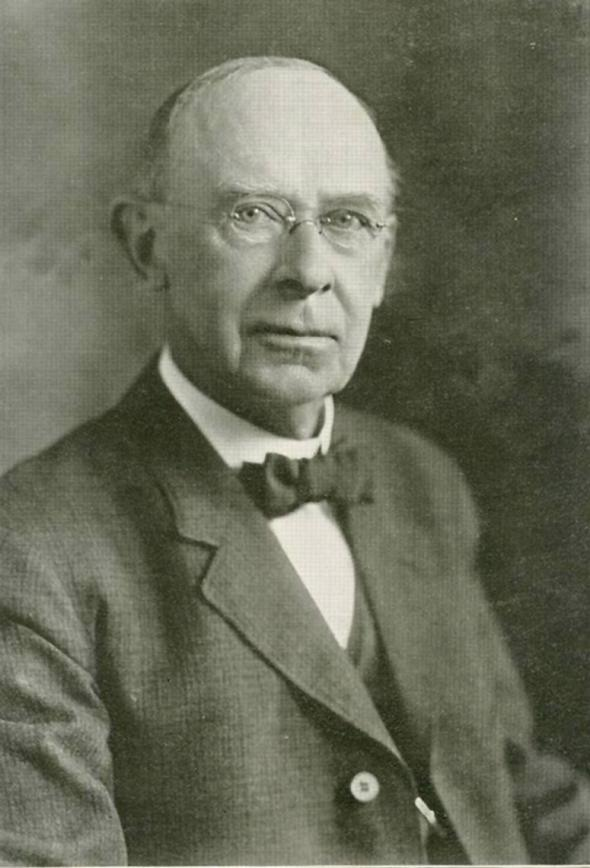
- Born: May 5, 1841; Philadelphia, Pennsylvania, US
- Died: March 28, 1918 (aged 76); Miami, Florida, US
- Occupations: Farmer, inventor and manufacturer
- Spouse: Sarah Hooton Roberts
- Children: 6

Samuel Leeds Allen (May 5, 1841 – March 28, 1918) was the founder of S.L. Allen & Company in Philadelphia. He was the inventor of, and his company manufactured, both the Flexible Flyer sled and Planet Jr farm and garden equipment. For over one hundred years these products were the best selling and most famous market gardening tools and American sleds. During his lifetime and for the first half of the 20th century S.L. Allen was far more renowned for his company's seed drills and cultivating equipment than the sleds.

== Biography ==
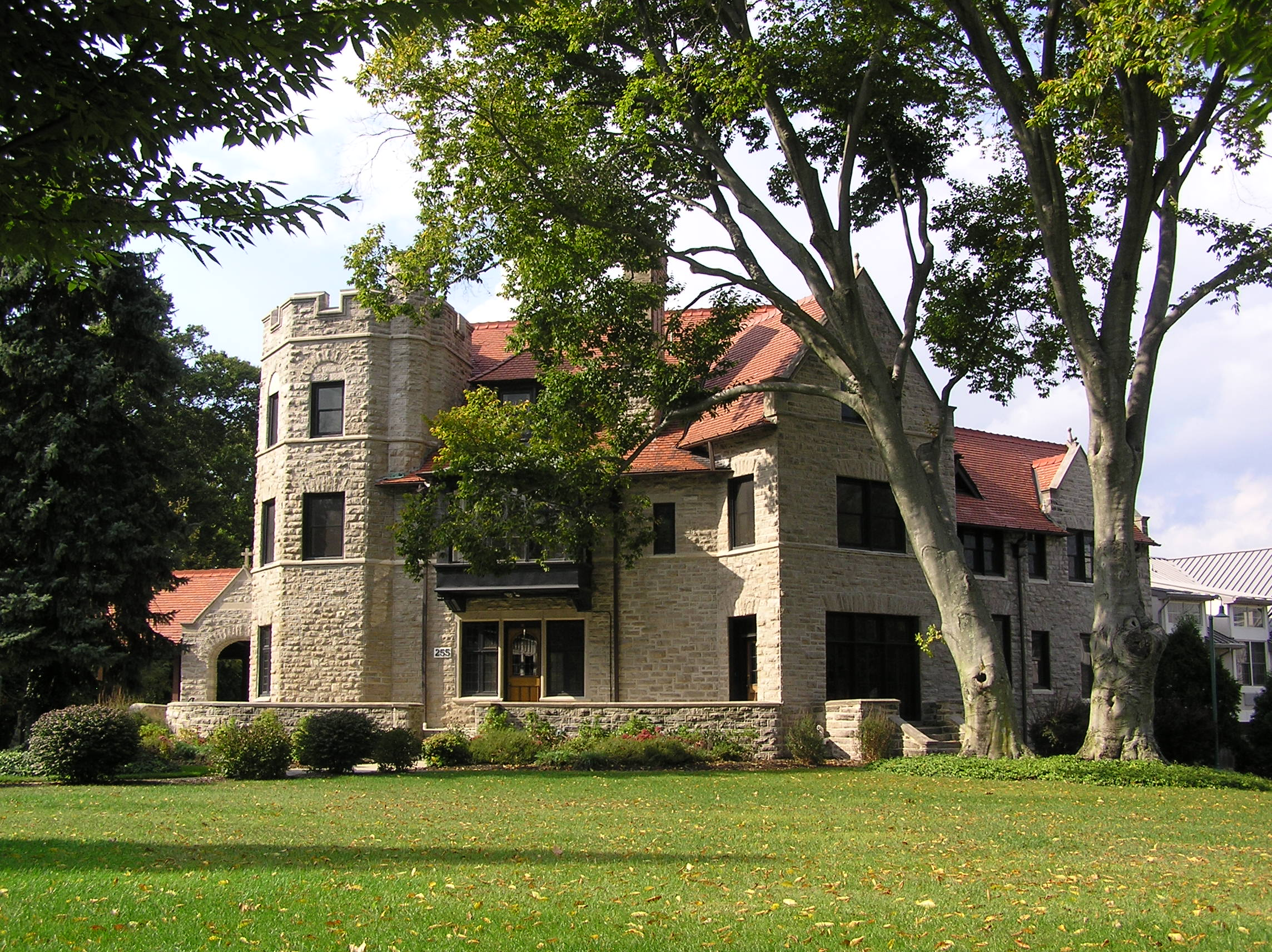
Breidenhart

Allen was born on May 5, 1841, in Philadelphia to Quaker parents: John Casdorp Allen, a prominent druggist, and Rebecca Smith Leeds, his wife.

In 1861, Allen moved to Ivystone, his father's farm near the community of Westfield in Cinnaminson Township, New Jersey.

On November 22, 1866, Samuel Leeds Allen and Sarah Hooton Roberts, the daughter of Elisha Roberts and Elizabeth West Hooton, were married in the Friends Meeting House, Moorestown, New Jersey.

Allen's revolutionary sled was developed and tested at Ivystone. Stokes Hill, a popular sledding area located next to Breidenhart, Allen's Moorestown home, has been mistakenly identified as the "birthplace" of the Flexible Flyer sled. Allen actually built his house in 1894, five years after the Flexible Flyer was introduced. However, the early versions of the sled were likely tested on Stokes Hill, which led to Allen fine tuning his invention. His Sled Patent No. 381,655, dated April 24, 1888, lists Allen as being from Cinnaminson, New Jersey. Another of his sled patents, Patent No. 797,165, dated Aug. 15, 1905, lists Allen as being from Moorestown, New Jersey.

== Legacy ==
Allen was awarded almost 300 patents for a wide range of farming machinery, including the fertilizer drill, seed drill, potato digger, cultivator, furrower, pulverizer, grass edger and numerous other farm implements. In order to provide year-round employment for his workers producing farm equipment, Mr. Allen sought to create a product that could be sold during the winter. His passion for sledding led him to develop a series of sleds and sled improvements. Allen was issued U.S. Patent number 408,681 on August 13, 1889, for the Flexible Flyer.

== Bibliography ==
- Allen, Elizabeth Roberts (1920). Samuel L. Allen; intimate recollections and letters. Philadelphia: Franklin Printing Co.
- DeCou, George (1929). Moorestown and her neighbors; historical sketches. Philadelphia: Harris & Partridge, Inc.
