= Flexible Flyer =

Toy brand selling steerable sleds

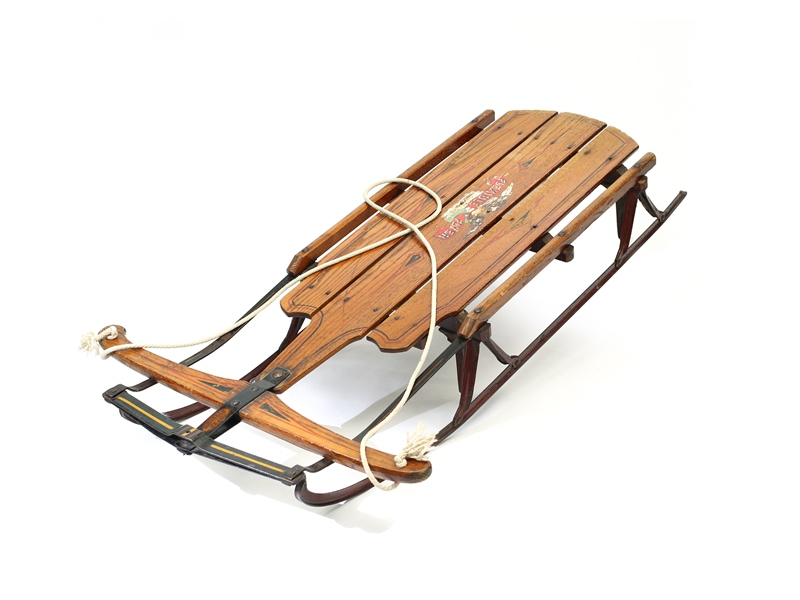
A Flexible Flyer sled, from 1936, within the permanent collection of The Children's Museum of Indianapolis

Flexible Flyer is a toy and recreational equipment brand, best known for the sled of the same name, a steerable wooden sled with steel runners.

== Operation ==
Flexible Flyers are flexible both in design and usage. Riders may sit upright on the sled or lie on their stomachs, allowing the possibility to descend a snowy slope feet-first or head-first. To steer the sled, riders may either push on the wooden cross piece with their hands or feet, or pull on the rope attached to the wooden cross-piece. Shifting the cross-piece one way or the other causes the flexible rails to bend, turning the sled.

== History ==
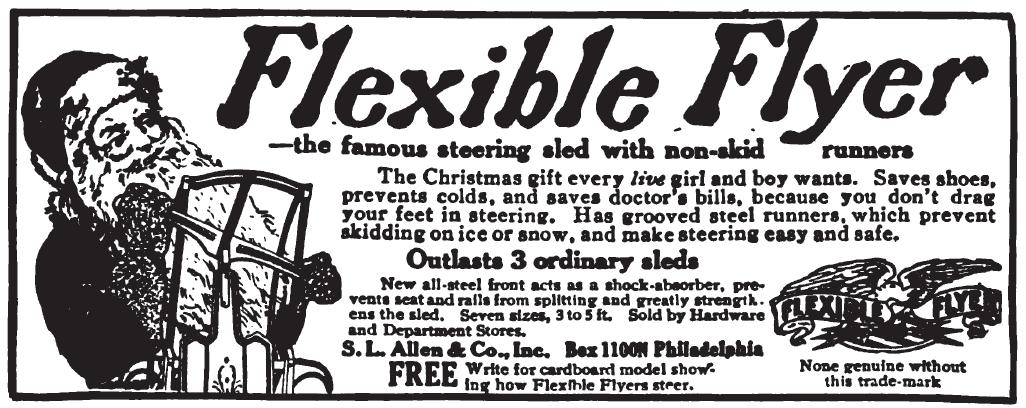
Flexible Flyer ad from the early 1900s

Samuel Leeds Allen patented the Flexible Flyer in 1889 in Cinnaminson, New Jersey, using local children and adults to test prototypes. Allen's company flourished by selling these speedy and yet controllable sleds at a time when others were still producing toboggans and "gooseneck" sleds.

Allen began producing sleds in his farm equipment factory to keep his workers busy during the slow season. He developed many prototypes before he created the Flexible Flyer. The sleds did not sell well until he began marketing them to the toy departments of department stores. In 1915, around 120,000 Flexible Fliers were sold, and almost 2,000 Flexible Flyers were sold in one day.

In 1968, Leisure Group of Los Angeles, California bought the S. L. Allen Company. Leisure Group continued to produce Flexible Flyers in Medina, Ohio. In 1973, a group of private investors bought Leisure Group's toy division and started manufacturing the sleds under the name "Blazon Flexible Flyer" in West Point, Mississippi. In 1993, Roadmaster purchased the rights to production and moved production to Olney, Illinois, and in 1998, production was moved to China. As of 2012, Flexible Flyers are mostly made in China and some are made in South Paris, Maine, by Paricon, Inc.

== Examples ==
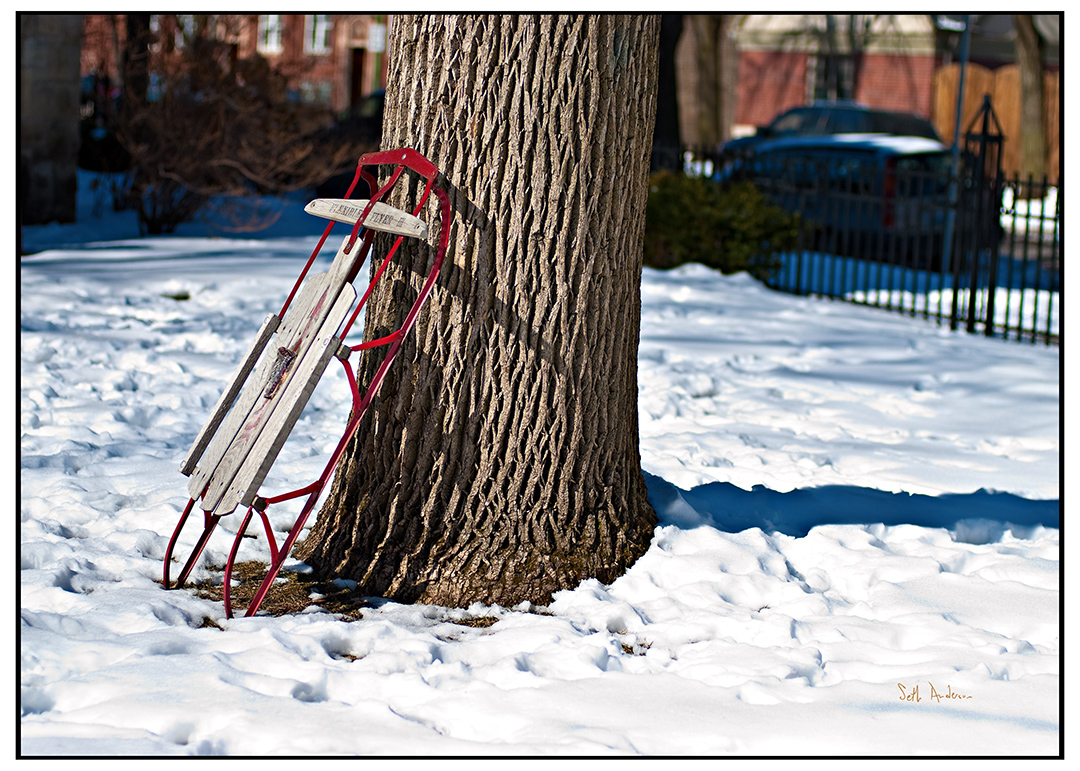
Flexible Flyer leaning against a tree

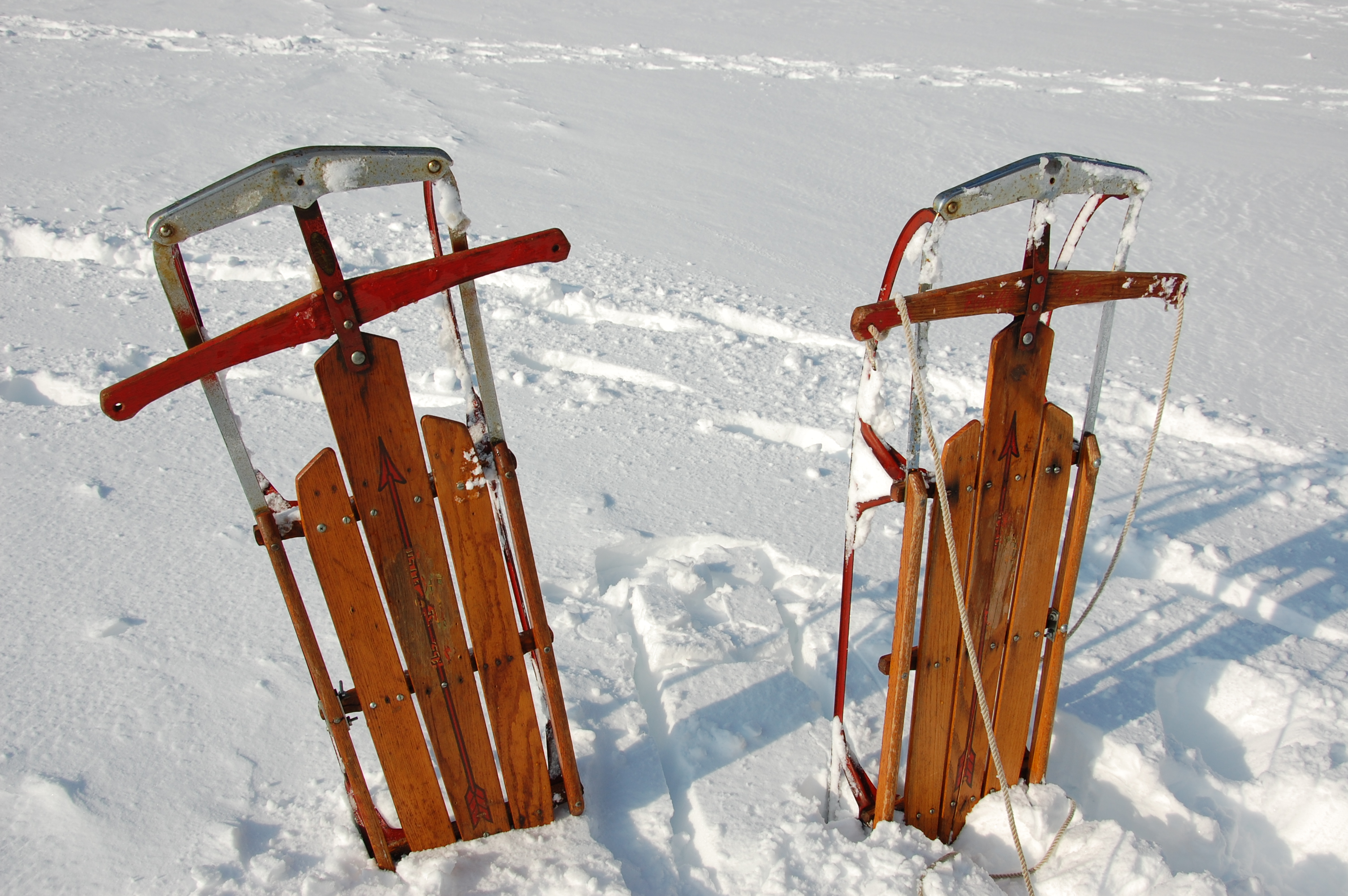
Flexible Flyers in the snow

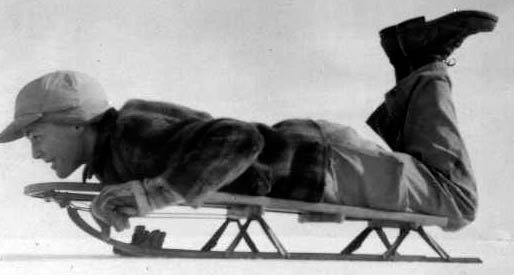
Boy on a Flexible Flyer, 1945

== Sources ==
- Hagley Museum and Library (22 January 2018). "It's all Downhill from Here!". Hagley Museum and Library.
