= Hornstine v. Township of Moorestown =

2003 US District Court case concerning disability

Hornstine v. Moorestown
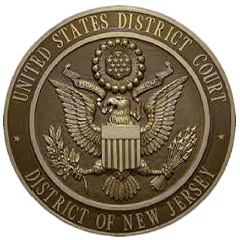
- Court: United States District Court for the District of New Jersey
- Full case name: Hornstine v. Township of Moorestown
- Decided: May 8, 2003
- Docket nos.: 03-cv-1953
- Defendant: Moorestown Township Public Schools
- Citation: 263 F. Supp. 2d 887

Court membership
- Judge sitting: Freda L. Wolfson

Hornstine v. Moorestown, 263 F. Supp. 2d 887 (D.N.J. 2003), was a 2003 case in the United States District Court for the District of New Jersey that considered whether grades received by a student with a disability for classes where accommodations had been made under an Individualized Education Program could be discounted in awarding valedictorian honors. Blair Hornstine, then in her final year at Moorestown High School, sued the Moorestown Township (New Jersey) Public Schools Board of Education to stop them "from retroactively applying to her a proposed policy amendment that would allow the designation of multiple valedictorians". Under the then existing school policy, Hornstine would have been the sole recipient of the honor.

== Valedictorian controversy ==
Under the published school board policy for the 2002–2003 academic year, the graduating senior student with the highest seventh semester weighted grade point average (GPA) was to be named the valedictorian, and the second highest student was to be named the salutatorian. At the end of the fall 2002 semester, the seventh for her class, Hornstine had the highest weighted grade point average in the senior class, 4.689, a score 0.055 higher than the runner-up's 4.634.

In the fall of 2002, Moorestown Superintendent of Schools Paul J. Kadri was approached by "parents, students, and other community members" who complained that "students were not provided equal opportunities to earn the awards" because of accommodations granted to Hornstine. Kadri held meetings at the high school in early 2003 in which he discussed changing the school policy to allow multiple valedictorians. In April, Kadri proposed an amendment to the existing policy that read, "In determining the recipients of [the awards of valedictorian and salutatorian], the Board may review the program of study, manner of instruction, and other relevant issues, and in its discretion, with the assistance of the administration, may designate multiple valedictorians and/or salutatorians to ensure that all students have an equal opportunity to compete for these awards." The proposal was to be voted on by the school board on May 12.

== Suit ==
On May 1, Hornstine filed a complaint in Federal District Court seeking an injunction to prevent the school board from changing its policy retroactively, as well as $2.7 million in damages. Kadri sent a letter to the runner-up advising him he was under consideration for valedictorian honors. Kadri sent no similar letter to Hornstine.

Blair Hornstine was classified with a disability, reportedly a type of chronic fatigue syndrome or immune deficiency, but its exact nature was never disclosed publicly. She received an Individualized Education Plan (IEP) approved by the school board. Kadri contended that because of the "availability of many AP courses in her home instruction program" Hornstine "was able to earn more 'weighted' grades" than other students. Moorestown High School assigned a higher weight to Advanced Placement (AP) courses and honors courses in calculating a student's GPA. At Moorestown High School, an A+ grade is worth 4.3 points towards the GPA in a standard course, 5.3 points in an AP course, and 4.8 points in an honors course. Kadri further claimed "she was also able to secure higher grades in her home instruction classes than students enrolled in the same courses at Moorestown High School."

The court rejected those claims pointing out that the runner up had taken two more AP courses than Hornstine, and while she had taken three more honors courses than the runner up, the net result was a statistical advantage for the runner up. The Court also examined and rejected claims that she was graded less stringently.

Superintendent Kadri claimed that Hornstine's father, a New Jersey Superior Court judge in Camden County, had told him in September that "he was going to manipulate rules designed to protect disabled students for the purpose of allowing [Blair Hornstine] to win the valedictorian award". Judge Hornstine denied making those statements and the assistant superintendent of schools, Judithann Keefe, who was present at the September meeting, filed an affidavit contradicting her boss and supporting Judge Hornstine's account of what was said there.

Local and later national media focused intense attention on the case, leading to talk-radio scorn and an online petition calling for Harvard University to revoke Hornstine's admission to the school. Following investigation, Harvard University did revoke her admission after finding that Hornstine had plagiarized an essay she had written for a local paper.

== Injunction granted and settlement ==
On May 8, 2003, U.S. District Judge Freda Wolfson ordered the Moorestown school district to follow its existing policy and name Blair Hornstine the sole valedictorian for the class of 2003. Wolfson wrote, "Ms. Hornstine earned her distinction as the top student in her class in spite of, not because of, her disability".

The Court found that Hornstine met the conditions for issuing an injunction, including a likelihood of prevailing on the merits of her case. In addition to finding that "the Board's proposed action was intended and designed to have a particular exclusionary effect on [the] plaintiff because of her disabled status," the Court cited a ruling by the New Jersey Commissioner of Education in a case in which there was no disability issue and that barred a retroactive change to requirements for the award of valedictorian.

On June 10, Hornstine, through her lawyer, Edwin Jacobs, informed the school that she would not attend graduation, which was held on June 19, and requested her valedictorian award be made in absentia, saying, "the hostile environment at the school has traumatized Blair both physically and emotionally." Her house had been hit by eggs and paintballs, and she had received a threatening letter. Hornstine's claim for compensatory and punitive damages was settled on August 19 for $60,000, including $45,000 in legal fees.

== See also ==
- Class rank – Comparative measure of students' performance
- Dean's list – Academic award
- Grade inflation – Awarding higher grades than deserved
- Salutatorian – Second highest-ranking student in a class
- Valedictorian – Highest-ranked graduate
