= Moorestown High School =

High school in Burlington County, New Jersey, US

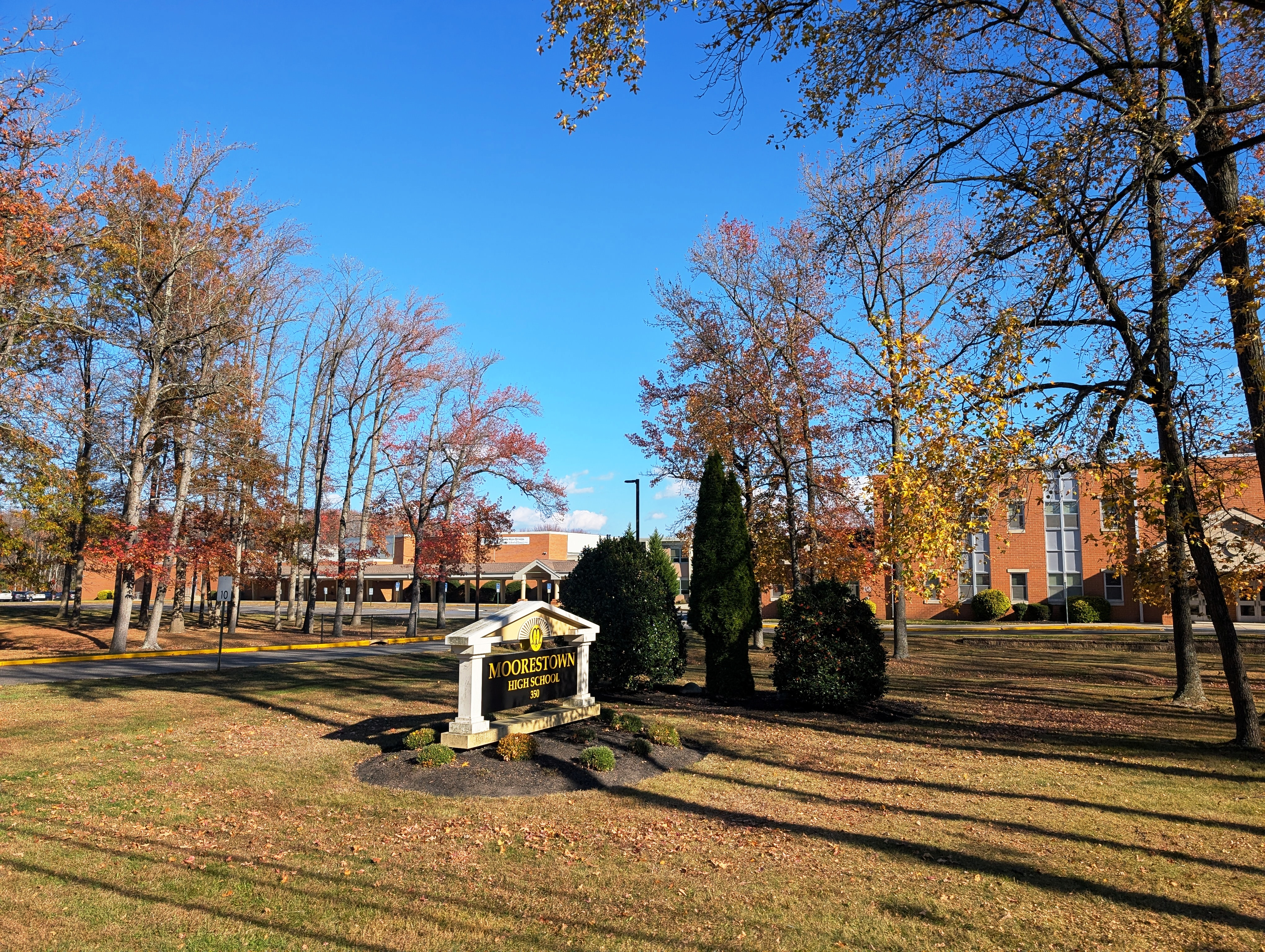
- Front along Bridgeboro Road

Location
- 350 Bridgeboro Road; Moorestown, Burlington County, New Jersey 08057; United States; 39.987095°N 74.944918°W

Information
- Type: Public high school
- Established: 1898
- School district: Moorestown Township Public Schools
- NCES School ID: 341071001132
- Principal: Andrew Seibel
- Faculty: 113.4 FTEs
- Grades: 9–12
- Enrollment: 1,251 (as of 2024–25)
- Student to teacher ratio: 11.0:1
- Colors: Yellow and Black
- Athletics conference: Olympic Conference; West Jersey Football League
- Team name: Quakers
- Rivals: Shawnee High School; Lenape High School
- Newspaper: The Voice
- Yearbook: Nutshell
- Website: School website

Moorestown High School (MHS) is a four-year comprehensive public high school that serves students in ninth through twelfth grades from Moorestown in Burlington County, in the U.S. state of New Jersey, operating as the lone secondary school of the Moorestown Township Public Schools. Moorestown High School was established in 1898 and has completed a $12.9 million renovation and addition project.

As of the 2024–25 school year, the school had an enrollment of 1,251 students and 113.4 classroom teachers (on an FTE basis), for a student–teacher ratio of 11.0:1. There were 102 students (8.2% of enrollment) eligible for free lunch and 8 (0.6% of students) eligible for reduced-cost lunch.

Moorestown High School was involved in the 2003 lawsuit Hornstine v. Township of Moorestown, which involved school policies to prevent a student from becoming valedictorian because of her Individualized Education Program.

== Awards, recognition and rankings ==
For the 1999–2000 school year, Moorestown High School was awarded the Blue Ribbon School Award of Excellence by the United States Department of Education, the highest award an American school can receive.

The school was the 14th-ranked public high school in New Jersey out of 339 schools statewide in New Jersey Monthly magazine's September 2014 cover story on the state's "Top Public High Schools", using a new ranking methodology. The school had been ranked 27th in the state of 328 schools in 2012, after being ranked 39th in 2010 out of 322 schools listed. Moorestown High School is by far the highest ranked school in Burlington County. The magazine ranked the school 47th in 2008 out of 316 schools. Schooldigger.com ranked the school tied for 93rd out of 381 public high schools statewide in its 2011 rankings (a decrease of 16 positions from the 2010 ranking) which were based on the combined percentage of students classified as proficient or above proficient on the mathematics (89.0%) and language arts literacy (94.8%) components of the High School Proficiency Assessment (HSPA).

In its 2013 report on "America's Best High Schools", The Daily Beast ranked the school 474th in the nation among participating public high schools and 40th among schools in New Jersey.

In its listing of "America's Best High Schools 2016", the school was ranked 112th out of 500 best high schools in the country; it was ranked 21st among all high schools in New Jersey and eighth among the state's non-magnet schools.

At Moorestown High School, students have the opportunity to take Advanced Placement courses and exams. About 59% of students on average take this opportunity and take AP courses. Around 48% of students are female and 52% are male. The student to teacher ratio is about 12:1. As of 2024 MHS is 947th in the National Rankings and 48th in New Jersey. When it comes to student proficiency, they score 37% for math, 73% on reading, and 62% in science. The graduation rate is 98%. However, when it comes to college readiness, it only scores a 52.6%. It is classified as a large suburban setting school (Greco).

== Athletics ==
The Moorestown High School Quakers compete in the Olympic Conference, which operates under the jurisdiction of the New Jersey State Interscholastic Athletic Association (NJSIAA) and is comprised of public and private high schools in Burlington, Mercer and Ocean counties in central New Jersey. With 954 students in grades 10–12, the school was classified by the NJSIAA for the 2019–20 school year as Group III for most athletic competition purposes, which included schools with an enrollment of 761 to 1,058 students in that grade range. The football team competes in the National Division of the 94-team West Jersey Football League superconference and was classified by the NJSIAA as Group IV South for football for 2024–2026, which included schools with 890 to 1,298 students.

Moorestown High School's record of athletic achievement includes 19 state championships in boys swimming and 15 state championships in field hockey. From 2000 through 2009, the girls' lacrosse team won 10 consecutive state championships.

The NJSIAA ranks New Jersey's high school athletic programs every academic year based on their performances in various sports across athletic seasons. Among all of the state's Group III programs, MHS was ranked 2nd in 2006 (one point behind Ramapo High School), 2nd in 2007 and was the Group III winner in 2008, with performances that included first-place finishes that season in football, both boys and girls lacrosse, and boys tennis.

Sports Legends of Moorestown was presented by the Historical Society of Moorestown at the Smith-Cadbury Mansion until the end of June 2010. More than 60 athletes, most of whom are MHS alumni, representing 14 sports were featured.

Bea Thomas, a coaching institution at MHS in field hockey, girls lacrosse and girls swimming, has been featured in The New York Times and Sports Illustrated.

The Moorestown High School Unified Basketball Team won a Gold Medal at the Special Olympics 2018 USA Games in Seattle, beating Ohio 27–18 and five teams in a matter of four days. They had also won their first state championship title earlier that season.

=== Baseball ===
- The 1982 baseball team won the Group II state championship, defeating Rutherford High School by a score of 6–4 in the tournament finals played at Mercer County Park.
- Kevin Kirkby was inducted into the Saint Joseph's University Baseball Hall of Fame. Kirkby was named as a 3rd-team All-American in 2001; 1st team Academic All-American in 2000 and 2001; and holds 14 season or career school records.

=== Basketball ===
- In 1958, the boys varsity basketball team was undefeated, 22–0, after winning the Group III state championship with a 77–54 victory against West Side High School in front of 4,000 spectators.
- In 1959, the team was undefeated, 22–0, and won the Group III state championship. The team played three memorable games in March, defeating a championship team from Philadelphia's Overbrook High School that was led by future NBA players Wali Jones and Walt Hazzard, beat Central Jersey champion Freehold by a score of 102–50 before a crowd of 5,000 at Camden's Convention Hall, and earned its second consecutive State Group III championship by defeating North Jersey champion Englewood, 76 - 61, before a capacity crowd of many thousands of cheering Quaker fans at Rutgers University. In a game that season against Hamilton High School, Ed Douglas scored 84 points.
- The team won the Group III state title in 2019, defeating Ramapo High School 58–44 in the finals. The team advanced to the Tournament of Champions as the fifth seed, defeating fourth-ranked Haddonfield Memorial High School 60–59 in the quarterfinals before falling to the top-seeded eventual champion Ranney School by 62–40 in the semifinals.
- Bob Meredith (1958), Ed Douglas (1959), Dave Robinson, (1959), Leroy Peacock (1960) and coach Pete Monska have been inducted into the South Jersey Basketball Hall of Fame.

=== Cross country ===
- The girls cross country team won the Group II state championship in 1997 and 2001, and won the Group III title in 1999.
- The boys cross country running team won the Group II state championship in 1962.
- In 2001, the girls team was ranked #1 in New Jersey and top 25 nationally. The team won the South Jersey Group III championship and had the fastest time for a team in Burlington County that season, in addition to runners participating in the Penn Relays and the Foot Locker National Meet.
- In 2010, the girls team, despite having their streak of 145 consecutive dual meet victories broken with their first loss since 1998, won its 14th consecutive league championship, captured the South Jersey Group III championship, and competed in the New Jersey Meet of Champions.

=== Field hockey ===
- The varsity field hockey won the Group III state championship in 1976 (as co-champion with Ramsey High School), 1978 (vs. Ramsey), 1982 (vs. Northern Valley Regional High School at Old Tappan), 2003 (vs. Warren Hills Regional High School), 2004 (vs. Mount Olive High School), 2006 (vs. Voorhees High School), 2017 (vs. Warren Hills) and 2018 (vs. Warren Hills), and won in Group II in 1981 (vs. Mount Olive), 1984 (vs. Newton High School), 1987 (co-champion with Westwood Regional High School), 1988 (vs. Wallkill Valley Regional High School), 1989 (vs. Pequannock Township High School), 1990 (vs. Madison High School), 1991 (vs. Boonton High School), 1995 (vs. West Essex High School), 1998 (vs. Pompton Lakes High School) and 2001 (vs. Madison). The program has won 18 state championships, the third-most of any school in the state.
- The 1976 team was co-champion with Ramsey after a 1–1 tie in the Group III state finals, to finish the season with a record of 17–0–4.
- After falling behind early 1–0, the 1978 came back to tie the game at the half and went on to win the Group III title by a score of 2–1 in the championship game at Mercer County Park.
- The 1989 team finished the season with a 19–1 record after two goals in the last minutes of the game gave the team a 2–0 victory against Pequannock Township in the Group II championship game.
- In 2003, the field hockey team won the State Group III championship with a 1–0 win over Kingsway Regional High School in the semifinals and a 2–1 win against Warren Hills in the tournament's final match.
- In 2004, the team repeated as the State Group III champion, defeating Mount Olive in the tournament final.
- In 2007, the team won the Central Jersey Group III championship with a 3–0 win over Wall High School in the tournament final.
- Meredith Elwell (1996) was named to the 1998 NCAA Division I field hockey All-America team.
- Amy Lewis (2004) was named to the 2008 NCAA Division I field hockey All-America team.

=== Football ===
MHS competes in the West Jersey Football League. In 1957, the varsity football team went undefeated, 9–0, and was awarded the South Jersey Group III championship. Since the start of the playoff era in 1974, the team won the South Jersey Group III championship in 1975 and the South Jersey Group II championship in 2000. In 2007, the team went undefeated, 12–0, and won the Central Jersey Group III championship by defeating Long Branch High School, 20–6.

=== Ice hockey ===
- In 2009 and 2010, the MHS "Quakes" won the South Jersey High School Ice Hockey League championship.

=== Lacrosse ===
The boys lacrosse team won the overall state championship in 2001 (defeating Summit High School in the tournament final), won the Group II state championship in 2008 (vs. West Morris Central High School), and won the Group III title in 2011 (vs. Ridge High School), 2017 (vs. Summit High School) and 2019 (vs. Chatham High School). The program's six state titles are tied for sixth-most in the state

In 2001, the boys' lacrosse team won the Tournament of Champions title, defeating Summit High School by a score of 8–3 in the final game of the tournament. In 2008, the team won the state Group II championship in 2008 with a 9–8 victory against West Morris Central High School and the state Group III championship in 2011 by defeating Ridge High School by 7–3 in the title game.

Sean DeLaney (2006) was named to the 2009 and 2010 NCAA Division I lacrosse All-America team and is a member of the Denver Outlaws.

The girls' varsity lacrosse team won the overall state championship in 1978 (defeating Cherry Hill High School East in the tournament final), 1983 (vs. Princeton High School), 1987 (vs. Montville Township High School), 1988 (vs. Montville), 1990 (vs. Shawnee High School), 1991 (vs. Shawnee), 1995 (vs. Columbia High School), 2000 (vs. West Essex High School), 2001 (vs. Shawnee), 2002 (vs. Shawnee), 2003 (vs. West Essex), 2004 (vs. Holy Cross High School), 2005 (vs. Oak Knoll School of the Holy Child) and 2006 (vs. Shore Regional High School), and won the Group III title in 2007 (vs. West Morris Central High School), 2008 (vs. West Morris Central), 2009 (vs. Ridgewood High School), 2011 (vs. West Morris Mendham High School), 2012 (vs. Mendham), 2013 (vs. Mendham), 2014 (vs. Mendham), 2015 (vs. Morristown High School), 2018 (vs. Summit), 2019 (vs. Mendham) and 2021 (vs. Chatham). The program has won 25 state championships, the most of any school in the state and more than the next three programs combined, while the streak of ten consecutive titles from 2000 to 2009 is the state's longest. The team won the Tournament of Champions in 2007 (vs. West Morris Mendham), 2008 (vs. Chatham High School), 2009 (vs. Mountain Lakes High School), 2012 (vs. Chatham), 2013 (vs. Shawnee), 2014 (vs. Summit) and 2018 (vs. Ridgewood); the program has won the Tournament of Champions seven times since the NJSIAA instituted the final tournament in 2007. From 1999 to 2010, the team accomplished an unprecedented level of achievement, including: A streak of 228 consecutive wins against New Jersey teams; a record of 270 wins and 12 losses versus all teams, including in-state and out-of-state powers.

The 2000 team finished the season with a record of 22–0 after winning the overall state title after defeating West Essex by a score of 15–4 in the championship game.

In 2009, the team won the Group III title with a 12–6 defeat of Ridgewood High School, marking the program's tenth consecutive group championship and 208th consecutive victory against teams in the state.

The Burlington County Times called the Moorestown-Shawnee girls lacrosse programs the "ultimate rivalry", citing the 14 straight years through 2012 in which the two teams played each other in the playoffs and the number of group titles won by the two programs.

Mary McCarthy Stefano (1983) was named to the 1985, 1986 and 1987 NCAA Division I lacrosse All-America first team and the National Lacrosse Hall of Fame. Jessica Champion (2003) was named to the 2007 NCAA Division I lacrosse All-America team; Margie Curran (2004) to the 2007 and 2008 team; Cara Giordano (2005) to the 2009 team; and Brooke Cantwell (2006) to the 2010 team.

=== Rowing ===
- In 2008, the boys lightweight-8 rowing team placed second at the Stotesbury Cup, the nation's biggest regatta.
- In 2009, the team placed first, beating Saint Joseph's Preparatory School by .04 seconds.
- In 2009, the girls JV-8 won third place at Stotesbury Cup. They were the first girls boat from Moorestown Rowing Club to make it to the finals and win a medal at Stotesbury.
- In 2021, the girls Varsity 8 placed second and the girls Second Varsity 8 placed third at the Stotesbury Cup
- In 2021 Moorestown High School ends its rowing program. The team became an unaffiliated youth rowing club, Moorestown Rowing Club.

=== Soccer ===
- The boys soccer team won the Group II state championship in 1981 (as co-champion with Vailsburg High School), 1997 (vs. Chatham High School), 2000 (as co-champion with West Essex High School).
- The girls' varsity team, under the coaching of Glenn Porter, won two state championships and for a month were ranked by USA Today as the number one team in the country.
- In 2007, the girls team won the South Jersey Group III championship, its third sectional title in four years, with a 2–1 win over Clearview Regional High School.
- Championships:
  - League championships- 1992–1995, 1998–2001, 2004–2007
  - South Jersey championships- 1994, 1995, 2001, 2004, 2005, 2007
  - State championships- 1994 (vs. West Morris Mendham), 1995 (co-champion with Glen Rock High School), 2004 (vs. Ridge High School) and 2005 (co-champion with Montgomery High School)

=== Swimming ===
- The boys' varsity swimming team won the Division B state title in 1960, 1961, 1966, 1968, 1970, 1972–1975, 1979–1981 and 1992–1994, and won the Public B title in 1997–1999, 2002, 2014 and 2015; The program's 20 state championships are the third-most of any school in the state. The girls' swimming team won the Public B title in 1995 and 2018–2020.
- In 2007, the boys' team won the Central Jersey B championship by defeating Ocean Township High School, 120–50.
- The boys' swim team won the Public B state championships in 2014 against Princeton High School by a score of 87–83. The victory marked the program's 19th state championship and its first since 1999. In 2015, the team won its second consecutive Public B title with a 94–76 win against Scotch Plains-Fanwood High School in the tournament final. Two members of the team each won two individual state championships apiece in 2014, becoming the first NJ teammates to accomplish the feat since 1999.
- The 2023 boys' team captured the Central Jersey Group B championship by defeating West Windsor-Plainsboro High School North 100-70 in the sectional finals.

=== Boys tennis ===
- The boys' tennis team has won 13 state titles, the third-most of any public high school, winning the Group III title in 1978 (vs. Millburn High School), 1981 (vs. Millburn), 2004 (vs. Ramapo High School), 2007 and 2008 (vs. Millburn both years) and 2013 (vs. Northern Valley Regional High School at Demarest), and in Group II in 1985 (vs. Holmdel High School), 1987 (vs. Millburn), 1991 (vs. Princeton High School), 1996 (vs. Millburn), 1997 (vs. Holmdel), 1998 (vs. Leonia High School) and 1999 (vs. Holmdel).
- The 1978 team became the first from South Jersey to win a state group title with a pair of 3–2 wins against Northern Highlands Regional High School in the semifinals and Millburn in the Group III finals.
- In 2001, the boys team won the South Jersey Group II championship with a 3–2 win over Haddonfield Memorial High School.
- In 2007, the boys team won the Central Jersey Group III championship with a series of 5–0 wins over Lawrence High School, West Windsor-Plainsboro High School North, and Princeton High School in the tournament final. Then the team won the State Group III Championship with a 3–2 win over Millburn High School. The team advanced to the Tournament of Champions where they lost in the semifinal round to Newark Academy.

=== Girls tennis ===
- The girls tennis team won the Group II state title in 1983 (defeating Millburn High School in the final match of the tournament), 1987 (vs. Madison High School), 1991 (vs. Princeton High School), 1992 (vs. Millburn), 1993 (vs. Millburn), 1994 (vs. Manasquan High School), 1997 (vs. Rumson-Fair Haven Regional High School), 2000 (vs. Summit High School), 2001 (vs. Summit), and won the Group III title in 1999 (vs. Princeton), 2002 (vs. Tenafly High School) and 2003 (vs. Northern Highlands Regional High School). The program's 12 state titles are ranked fifth in the state. The team won the Tournament of Champions in 1992 (vs. runner-up Marlboro High School) and 1994 (vs. Ramapo High School) The 1987 team defeated Rumson-Fair Haven 4–1 in the semifinals and won the Group II title with a 3–2 win against Madison.
- In 2007, the girls team won the South Jersey Group III championship with a 5–0 win over Seneca High School.
- William Kingston, coach of the girls team for 29 years, compiled a 694–75 record.

=== Track and field ===
- The boys track team won the indoor relay state championship in Group III in 1975 (as co-champion). The girls team won the Group II title in 1994.
- The boys track team won the Group III spring / outdoor track state championship in 1975 and 1976.
- The boys track team won the indoor track public state championship in 1976.
- In 2010, the boys relay team ran a 4x100 meter race in 42.31 seconds, setting a MHS record and finishing in second place at the New Jersey Meet of Champions. The relay team also ran in the New Balance Outdoor Nationals, the high school national track championship meet.
- In 2007, the girls track and field team was undefeated and won the Liberty Division championship.
- Anna Heim (2006) set NCAA Division III records for the indoor and outdoor pole vault and was named to the 2010 Division III indoor track and field All-America team.

=== Volleyball ===
- The girls team won the conference for eight consecutive seasons.
- In 2006, the team broke state records with 34 wins and consecutive wins, and ended the season 34–1, before losing in the Group III state semifinals to Williamstown High School.

== Administration ==
The school's principal is Andrew Seibel. His core administrative team includes two assistant principals.

== Notable alumni ==
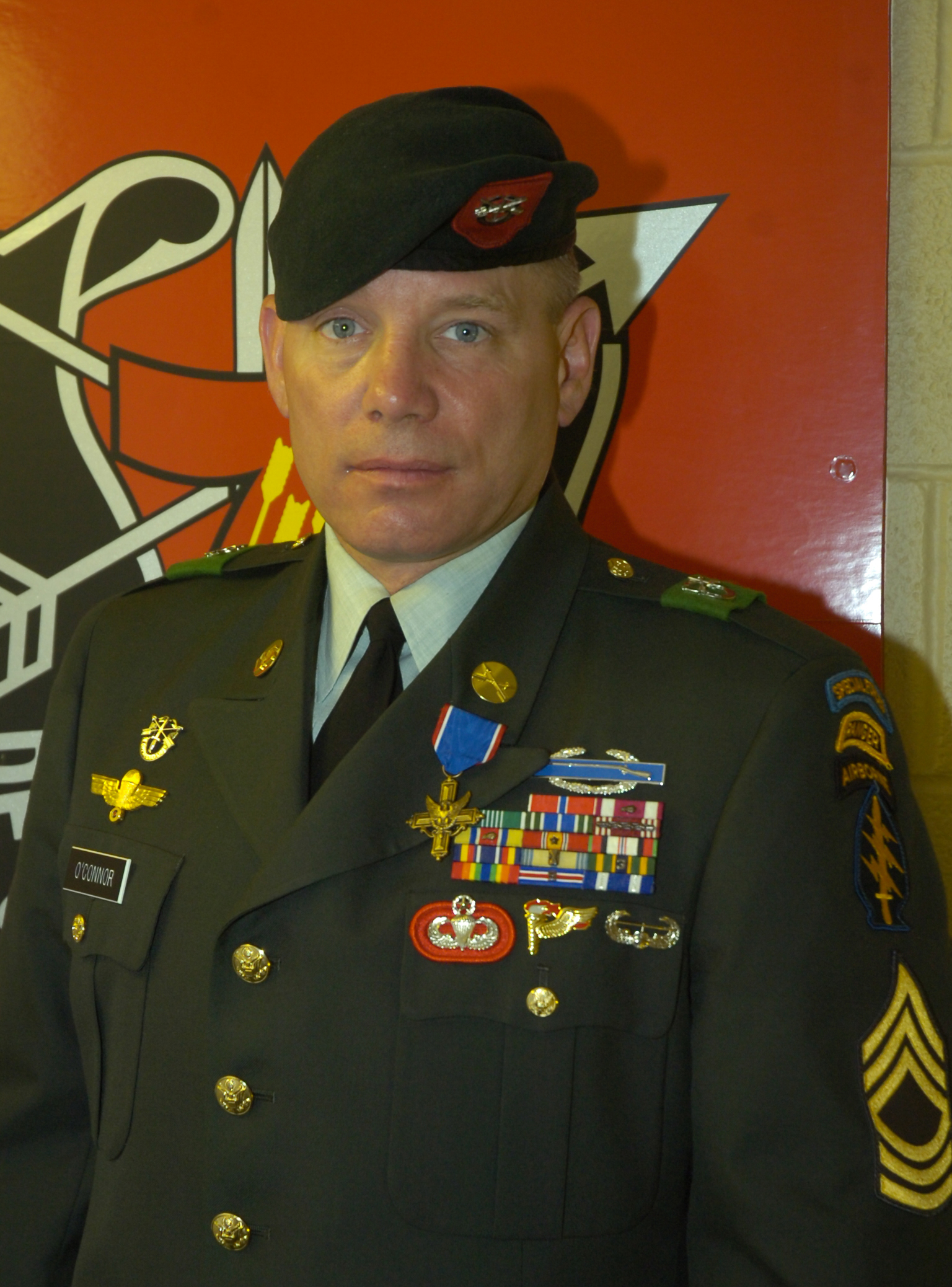
Brendan O'Connor

- Diane Allen (born 1948), represents the 7th Legislative District in the New Jersey General Assembly
- Francis L. Bodine (1936–2023), represented the 8th Legislative District in the New Jersey General Assembly from 1994 to 2008
- T. J. Brennan (born 1989), defenseman for the Toronto Maple Leafs of the NHL
- Joe Burk (1914–2008), world-class sculler and recipient of the Bronze Star, Silver Star and Navy Cross
- Bryan Burnham (born 1990), football player for the BC Lions of the Canadian Football League
- Kevin Chamberlin (born 1963, class of 1981), television and theatre actor
- Dereck Faulkner (born 1985), football wide receiver who is currently a free agent
- Walter French (1899–1984), Army football All-America, halfback for the 1925 Pottsville Maroons and outfielder for the Philadelphia Athletics in the 1929 World series
- Blair Hornstine, student who successfully sued to block a proposed change in school district policy; under the pre-existing policy she would have been named sole valedictorian
- Ruth G. King (born 1933), educational psychologist who was the first female president of the Association of Black Psychologists
- Matt Langel (born 1977, class of 1996), head coach for the Colgate Raiders men's basketball team
- Al LeConey (1901–1959), gold medal winner in the 4x100 meter relay race at the 1924 Summer Olympics
- Ben Leonberg (born 1987, class of 2006), film director, screenwriter and producer, known for his work in the horror and fantasy genres
- Peter Mishler (born 1980/81, class of 1999), poet and editor
- Brendan O'Connor (born c. 1960), recipient of the Distinguished Service Cross for his heroic action in Afghanistan
- Christine O'Donnell (born 1969, class of 1987), Republican candidate in Delaware's 2010 United States Senate special election
- Harrison Rieger (born 1998, class of 2017), professional basketball player for Halcones de Sonzacate of the Liga Superior de Baloncesto de El Salvador
- Dave Robinson (born 1941, class of 1959), Pro Football Hall of Fame enshrinee and a former football player for Penn State University, the Green Bay Packers and the Washington Redskins.
- Lauren Schmetterling (born 1988, class of 2006), rower who won a total of three gold medals in the Women's eight competition at the 2013 World Rowing Championships, the 2015 World Rowing Championships and the 2016 Summer Olympics in Rio de Janeiro
- Scott Terry (born 1976), songwriter and singer who has fronted the band Red Wanting Blue
- Denise Wescott, collegiate lacrosse coach
- Albert Young (born 1985), former football player for the University of Iowa and Minnesota Vikings
