= Latin honors =

Phrases for levels of academic distinction

Latin honors are a system of Latin phrases used in some colleges and universities to indicate the level of distinction with which an academic degree has been earned. The system is primarily used in the United States. It is also used in some Southeastern Asian countries with European colonial history, such as Indonesia and the Philippines, and African countries such as Zambia and South Africa, although sometimes translations of these phrases are used instead of the Latin originals. The honors distinction should not be confused with the honors degrees offered in some countries, or with honorary degrees. In countries that use Latin honors, they are normally awarded to undergraduate students earning bachelor's degrees and to law school graduates. They are not usually used for graduate students receiving master's or doctorate degrees.

The Latin honors system has three standard levels (listed in order of increasing merit): cum laude, magna cum laude, and summa cum laude. The regulations of each college or university normally set out criteria that a student must meet in order to obtain a given honor. For example, the student might be required to achieve a specific class ranking, a specific grade point average, submit an honors thesis for evaluation, or be part of an honors program. Each school sets its own standards. Because these standards vary, the same level of Latin honors conferred by different institutions can represent different levels of achievement. Some institutions use non-Latin equivalents, while certain other institutions do not use honors at all, such as Massachusetts Institute of Technology (MIT), Yale Law School, and Stanford Law School.

== English-speaking countries ==
=== United States ===
==== Distinctions ====
Georgetown University diploma in Latin, with summa cum laude honors

Most American colleges and universities use Latin honors for bachelor's degrees and for the Juris Doctor degree, but not for other degrees such as master's degrees or the Ph.D. and M.D. degrees. There are three standard levels of Latin honors:

- cum laude (English: /kum ˈlaʊdeɪ/), meaning "with praise", typically awarded to graduates in the top 20%, 25%, or 33% of their class, depending on the institution.
- magna cum laude (/ˈmæɡnə/), meaning "with great praise", typically awarded to graduates in the top 5%, 10%, or 15% of their class, depending on the institution.
- summa cum laude (/ˈsuːmə/), meaning "with highest praise", typically awarded to graduates in the top 1%, 2%, or 5% of their class, depending on the institution. Some institutions either do not award the summa cum laude distinction or award it only in extraordinary circumstances.

==== History ====
In 1869, Harvard College became the first college in the United States to award final honors to its graduates. From 1872 to 1879, cum laude and summa cum laude were the two Latin honors awarded to graduates. Beginning in 1880, magna cum laude was also awarded. In his 1895 history of Amherst College, college historian William Seymour Tyler traced Amherst's system of Latin honors to 1881, and attributed it to Amherst College president Julius Hawley Seelye:

Instead of attempting to fix the rank of every individual student by minute divisions on a scale of a hundred as formerly, five grades of scholarship were established and degrees were conferred upon the graduating classes according to their grades. If a student was found to be in the first or lowest grade, he was not considered as a candidate for a degree, though he might receive a certificate stating the facts in regard to his standing; if he appeared in the second grade the degree of A.B. was conferred upon him rite; if in the third, cum laude; if in the fourth, magna cum laude; while if he reached the fifth grade he received the degree summa cum laude. The advantages of this course, as stated to the trustees by the president, are that it properly discriminates between those who, though passing over the same course of study, have done it with great differences of merit and of scholarship, and that it furnishes a healthy incentive to the best work without exciting an excessive spirit of emulation.

The new system of administration, of which the above is a part, is so original and peculiar that it is known as the Amherst System.

— A History of Amherst College During the Administrations of Its First Five Presidents, from 1821 to 1891

=== United Kingdom ===
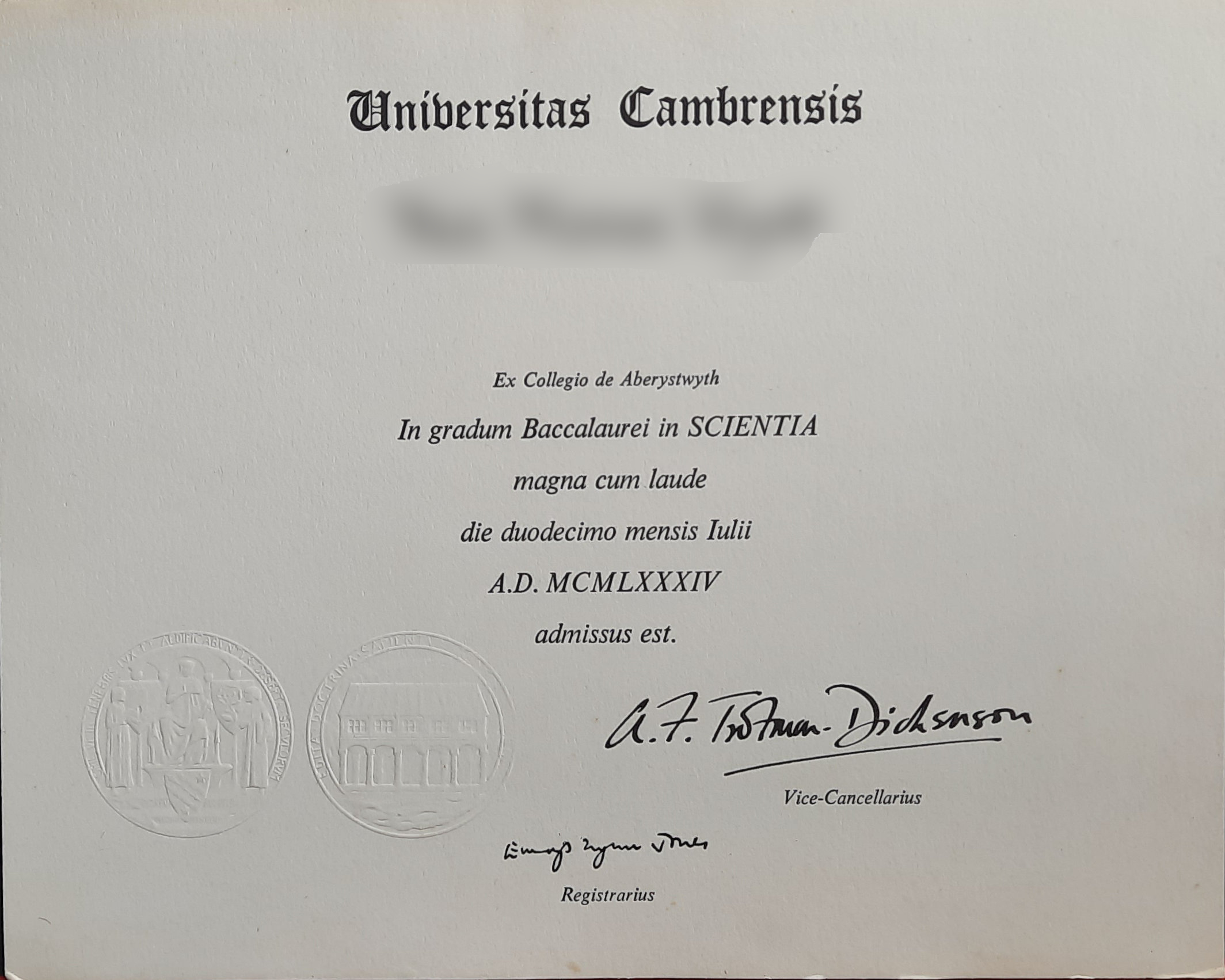
University of Wales degree certificate in Latin, 1984

In the UK, the Latin cum laude is used in commemorative Latin versions of degree certificates sold by a few universities (e.g. the University of Edinburgh) to denote a bachelor's degree with honours, but the honours classification is stated as in English, e.g. primi ordinis for first class rather than summa cum laude, etc. Official degree certificates use English.

== Other countries ==
For undergraduate degrees, Latin honors are used in only a few countries such as Israel, Indonesia, Lebanon, the Dominican Republic, the Philippines, one university in Singapore and Canada. Most countries use a different scheme, such as the British undergraduate degree classification (usually used in Commonwealth countries) which is more widely used with varying criteria and nomenclature depending on country, including Australia, Bangladesh, Barbados, Brazil, Colombia, Georgia, Hong Kong, India, Ireland, Jamaica, Kenya, New Zealand, Nigeria, Pakistan, Singapore, Sri Lanka, South Africa, Trinidad and Tobago, Uganda, the United Kingdom, Zimbabwe and many other countries. Malta shows the Latin honors on the degree certificates, but the UK model is shown on the transcript.

=== Austria ===
In Austria, the only Latin honor in use is sub auspiciis Praesidentis rei publicae ("under the auspices of the president of the republic") for doctoral degrees. Candidates must have consistently excellent grades throughout high school and university, making it very difficult to attain: only about 20 out of a total of 2,500 doctoral graduates per year (i.e. 0.8%) achieve a sub auspiciis degree.

=== Belgium ===
In Belgium, the university degree awarded is limited to:

- cum fructu <68% (op voldoende wijze in Dutch, avec satisfaction in French)
- cum laude >68% (met onderscheiding in Dutch, avec distinction in French)
- magna cum laude >77% (met grote onderscheiding in Dutch, avec grande distinction in French)
- summa cum laude >85% (met grootste onderscheiding in Dutch, avec la plus grande distinction in French)
- summa cum laude with the congratulations of the examination committee >90% (met grootste onderscheiding en de gelukwensen van de examencommissie in Dutch, avec la plus grande distinction avec félicitations du jury in French)

=== Brazil ===
In Brazil, most universities do not provide honors to their students. Among the few universities that do so, the Instituto Tecnológico de Aeronáutica (ITA—Technological Institute of Aeronautics) awards the cum laude honor for graduates with every individual grade above 8.5 (out of 10.0), the magna cum laude honor for graduates with average grade above 8.5 and more than 50% of individual grades above 9.5, and the summa cum laude honor for graduates with average grade above 9.5. As of 2009, only 22 graduates have received the summa cum laude honor at ITA. The Federal University of Rio de Janeiro awards the cum laude honor for graduates with average grade from 8.0 to 8.9, the magna cum laude honor for graduates with average grade from 9.0 to 9.4, and the summa cum laude honor for graduates with average grade from 9.5 to 10.0. The Federal University of Ceará awards the magna cum laude honor for undergraduates who have never failed a course, achieved an average grade from 8.5 (out of 10.0) and have received a fellowship of both Academic Extension and Teaching Initiation.

=== Czech Republic ===
In the Czech Republic, universities usually award the summa cum laude distinction to its best graduates in bachelors and masters study programmes. The criteria required by Czech universities are usually the following: a) an overall study results average up to 1.5 out of 4.0 (while "1" is the best, "excellent" grade and "4" is the failing grade), b) completion of the final state exam with the overall classification of 1 ("excellent") and also c) proper completion of studies in a period not exceeding the standard period of study by more than one year. Other distinctions such as magna cum laude or cum laude are not used. Alternatively, the phrase s vyznamenáním, which means "with honours", is substituted for the usual summa cum laude. The Czech universities usually do not award any Latin honours to its graduates in rigorosum and doctoral study programmes.

=== Estonia ===
In Estonia, up until 2010 both summa cum laude and cum laude were used. Summa cum laude was awarded only for very exceptional work. Since 1 September 2010, only cum laude is used. It is awarded to bachelors, masters and integrated studies graduates. Occasionally the word kiitusega, which means "with praise", is substituted for the usual cum laude. To receive cum laude one must achieve a 4.60 GPA (out of 5) and receive the highest grade (A – 5.00) for the thesis or the final examination.

=== Finland ===
The Finnish Matriculation Examinations at the end of lukio/gymnasium uses the grades of: improbatur (I, failing; "not accepted"), approbatur (A; "accepted"), lubenter approbatur (B; "willingly accepted"), cum laude approbatur (C; "accepted with praise"), magna cum laude approbatur (M; "accepted with great praise"), eximia cum laude approbatur (E; "accepted with excellent praise") and laudatur (L; "praised"). They are roughly equivalent to Finnish school grades ranging from 4 to 10. Some Finnish universities, when grading master's theses and doctoral dissertations, use the same scale with the additional grade of non sine laude approbatur (N; "accepted not without praise") between lubenter and cum laude; technical universities use a numerical scale (1–5) instead.

=== France ===
In France, usually the French honors mention très bien ("very good mention"), mention bien ("good mention"), and mention assez bien ("quite good mention") are used. However some Grandes Écoles, like the Institut d'études politiques de Paris, HEC Paris, use the Latin and English titles "summa cum laude" / "graduated with highest honors" for the top 2% and "cum laude" / "graduated with honors" for the next 5% of a year. From 2016, honorifics ceased to be used for the completion of a PhD. Before this date, the French PhD diploma could be awarded with increasing honors: mention bien, mention très honorable, mention très honorable avec félicitations du jury. While these honors grades have been revoked for the PhD diploma, they are still in use for doctors of Medicine, Pharmacy, and Dental Medicine.

=== Germany ===
In Germany, the range of degrees is:

- sub omni canone ("below any scale", fail, numerical grade 5.0) (see Sub omni canone in German Wikipedia)
- non sufficit or non rite ("insufficient", fail, numerical grade 4.0–5.0)
- rite ("duly" conferred, that is, the requirements are fulfilled, numerical grade 3.0–4.0)
- satis bene – or no additional comment ("satisfying", numerical grade 3.0)
- cum laude ("with honors", numerical grade 2.0)
- magna cum laude ("with great honors", numerical grade 1.0)
- summa cum laude ("with highest honors", numerical grade <1.0).

These degrees are mostly used when a doctorate is conferred, not for diplomas, bachelor's or master's degrees, for which numerical grades between 1.0 ("very good") and 4.0 ("pass"), and 5.0 ("fail"), are given.

=== Hungary ===
In Hungary, the range of degrees—similar to the German system—is: rite ("duly" conferred, that is, the requirements are fulfilled), cum laude (with honors), summa cum laude (with highest honors). These degrees are used in university diplomas and in certain fields of sciences (medical, legal and a very few others) only. The grades of degrees are dependent on the received average points from final exams and from average points from the university studies.

=== Indonesia ===
Latin honors are used widely in Indonesia, the order of increment are:

- cum laude, meaning "with honors" (or literally "with praise")—GPA 3.51 - 3.59
- magna cum laude, meaning "with great honors" (or literally "with great praise")— 3.60 - 3.79
- summa cum laude, meaning "with highest honors" (or literally "with the highest praise")—GPA 3.80 and above

A fourth order, egregia cum laude, meaning 'with extraordinary honors', is occasionally used: it was created to recognise students who earned the same grade point average as a summa, but earned it while pursuing a more rigorous degree curriculum.

A less commonly used grade, maxima cum laude, or 'with very great honors', is an intermediate order between summa and magna. This distinction is sometimes used when the university regulation for summa is only awarded to students with perfect academic grades (4.0 / 4.0 GPA).

=== Italy ===
In Italy, the cum laude notation (con lode being the equivalent in Italian) is used as an increasing level of the highest grade for both exams (30/30) and degrees (110/110), in all its levels; Passing an exam cum laude (30 e lode) has usually only an honorific meaning, but sometimes it influences the average grade and can be useful to the student so honored (usually weighting 31/30). "30 e lode" is usually awarded after answering correctly a bonus difficult question at the oral examination.

In Italy, 110 e lode (at institutions using a 110-point system) is the highest rank that can be achieved during the academic studies, and corresponds usually to a final score greater than 110/110 (the specific threshold varies from university to university). Up to 3 bonus points can be awarded for merits, e.g. having an average exams score greater than 28.5/30 (95% equivalent), excellent final project or for graduating on time. More notations include: bacio e abbraccio accademico ("academic kiss and embrace"), menzione d'onore ("honor mention"), and dignità di stampa ("dignity of printing"), and were given based on various university-specific requirements, but without a legal value.

=== Malta ===
In Malta, for Bachelor Honours degrees summa cum laude refers to first class honours, magna cum laude refers to second class honours (upper division), cum laude refers to second class honours (lower division), whilst bene probatus refers to third class honours. Professional degrees lasting longer than the standard three years such as the five year Bachelor of Pharmacy are awarded egregia cum laude. Postgraduate diplomas and master's degrees may be awarded as pass with distinction (summa cum laude), pass with merit (magna cum laude), or pass (bene probatus).

=== Mexico ===
In Mexico, cum laude (also known as mención honorífica in Spanish) is used, by the major universities, to recognize an outstanding dissertation for bachelor's, master's and PhD degrees. Also different awards on public and private universities are given to the student with the highest final grade average (i.e. Presea Lázaro Cárdenas or Gabino Barreda Medal) and a diploma is given as a form of cum laude.

=== Netherlands ===
In the Netherlands, two classes of honors may be used for bachelor's, master's and PhD degree programs: cum laude (with honor) and summa cum laude (with highest honor). Typically these distinctions are reserved to mark exceptional achievement above a high minimum grade point average. Sometimes it is lost, despite a high average mark, when the student gets a mark of 6 or lower for one of the many exams (on a scale of 1–10, where 10 is the highest). It may also be awarded based on the weighted average of first achieved grades for each subject only. Generally, less than 2% receive the cum laude distinction. It is also possible to receive a PhD degree cum laude, although this honor is even rarer than for master's graduates. In view of the difficulty and subjectivity of determining this, some universities and fields of study very seldom award doctorates cum laude. At Dutch university colleges cum laude, magna cum laude and, exceptionally, summa cum laude may be awarded.

=== Philippines ===
In the Philippines, junior high school and senior high school students under the new K–12 curriculum use an honor system using Filipino translations of the Latin original. Students who achieve a final grade average of 90-94 are awarded the title May Karangalan (with honors) and will receive a bronze medal with the DepEd seal. Those who have a final grade average of 95–97 receive the title of May Mataas na Karangalan (with high honors) and a silver medal with the same seal. Students with a final grade average of 98-100 shall be awarded the title of May Pinakamataas na Karangalan (with highest honors) and a gold medal with the same specification. In college, students are awarded the latin honors cum laude, magna cum laude and summa cum laude, respectively.

=== Russia ===
In Russia, the honor system is based on the grade point average. At least 4.75 out of 5.0 points are required for the summa cum laude degree (in Russian, с отличием s otlichiem, "with excellence"). The graduate has to receive a perfect grade on all final examinations. Usually less than 2% of all graduating students accomplish this (depending on the university and year). In military schools, a "red diploma" may be accompanied by a gold medal (summa cum laude) for outstanding performance. Russian high schools also award a gold medal to the student who achieves a perfect score in all final examinations and in all other subjects not requiring a final exam. A silver medal is awarded to high school students who have one or two grades of 4 (Russian: хорошо horosho, "good", being second highest grade) on their final exams or other subjects as listed in the high school diploma (аттестат о (полном) среднем образовании attestat o (polnom) srednem obrazovanii).

=== Singapore ===
In Singapore, the Latin honors, cum laude, magna cum laude and summa cum laude are used by Singapore Management University. Graduates from Singapore Management University have to achieve GPAs of 3.4, 3.6 and 3.8 out of 4.0 respectively and without any exceptions to qualify for the Latin honors.

It was also used by Yale-NUS College, with the top 5% of a graduating class receiving summa cum laude, the next 10% magna cum laude, and the next 20% cum laude. There are no credit (CAP) requirements to achieve the Latin honors at Yale-NUS College.

=== South Africa ===
In South Africa, the Latin honors cum laude is used for bachelor's degrees, honour's degrees and master's degrees, and is awarded to students who have achieved an average grade of 75% or higher throughout the degree. Cum laude in South Africa can be considered broadly equivalent to a first class degree in the United Kingdom or a GPA of 3.7–4.0 in the United States.

=== Spain ===
In Spain, the Latin honors cum laude is used for PhD degrees only and is the highest possible qualification. It is only applicable to doctoral degrees that achieve an outstanding mark (10/10) and it is awarded after a secret vote of the jury members, using envelopes that must be opened in a session separate from the defense session. Obtaining the qualification of doctorate cum laude requires the unanimity of the members of the examining board (between 3 and 5 experts, depending on the university). In Spain, the cum laude mention is regulated by RD 534/2013.

=== Switzerland ===
In Switzerland, the degrees rite, cum laude, magna cum laude, insigni cum laude ("distinguished with praise"), and summa cum laude are used, but the exact GPA corresponding to each varies by institution.

=== Ukraine ===
In Ukraine, the university education honor system is based on by-law # 161 (2 June 1993) of the Ministry of Education of Ukraine (3.12.3.5). For a student to graduate from a university with a diploma with honors (cum laude), students have to receive mark 5 (excellent) at least on 75% of courses, receive mark 4 (good) at max 25% of courses, and pass the state exams only with mark 5 (excellent). Also, students are expected to have participated in research projects with visible results.

=== Vietnam ===
In Vietnam, the honors used by most public universities are xuất sắc ("excellent") and giỏi ("good"), which are set by a fixed GPA threshold issued by the Ministry of Education and Training. Partially due to grade inflation, this have resulted in some instances of perceived "honors inflation" where more than half of graduates at some universities were eligible for such honors. Private universities such as Fulbright University Vietnam follow the American model where the GPA cutoff for academic honors is set in relative to the pool of graduates that year, such as summa cum laude (top 5%), magna cum laude (top 10%), and cum laude (top 20%). Meanwhile, RMIT University Vietnam and British University Vietnam followed the British undergraduate degree classification.

== See also ==
- Class rank – Comparative measure of students' performance
- Dean's list – Academic award
- Grade inflation – Awarding higher grades than deserved
- Salutatorian – Second highest-ranking student in a class
- Valedictorian – Highest-ranked graduate
- Honors student – Student recognized for achieving high grades or high marks in their course work
- Honours degree – academic degree with a higher standard of study
