= Dean's list =

Academic award

A dean's list is an academic award, or distinction, used to recognize the highest level scholarship demonstrated by students in a college or university. This system is most often used in North America, though institutions in Europe, Asia, and Australia may also employ similar measures. It is often synonymous with honor roll and honor list, but should not be confused with honours degrees.

Generally, students enrolled in college or university would need to satisfy a series of specific requirements before receiving the dean's list. These requirements may differ across institutions, but in most cases will require students to enroll in a full-time capacity, to achieve a specific grade point average within the academic term, and to maintain a specific cumulative grade point average throughout enrollment. Universities may often establish further rewards, such as annual dean's lists, for students that demonstrate even greater academic distinction. As such, a dean's list and its direct derivatives are usually intended for students that demonstrate highest scholarship across multiple disciplines, and not necessarily bound to a specific field of study.

Over time, the dean's list has also led to the creation of additional awards with similar nomenclatures, including the provost's list, the chancellor's list, the rector's list (mostly limited to within Europe), and the director's list. The additional requirements to be met for such honors may include academic distinction within a target field of study, extracurricular achievements, continued high scholarship throughout enrollment or other noteworthy accomplishments.

== Distinction ==
=== Comparison to North American Latin honors ===
Although the dean's list and Latin honors may both be issued in recognition of high scholarship, they are mostly separate awards not intended for direct comparison. Many institutions confer three levels of Latin honors, as follows:

- cum laude, meaning "with praise" (or "with honor")
  - In North America, this honor is typically awarded to graduates in the top 25 percent (or 30 percent) of their class.
- magna cum laude, meaning "with great honor"
  - In North America, this honor is typically awarded to graduates in the top 10 percent (or 15 percent) of their class; this is the highest honor awarded at some institutions.
- summa cum laude, meaning "with highest honor"
  - In North America, this honor is typically awarded to graduates in the top 1 to 5 percent of their class.

Because Latin honors are often conferred to the approximate class rank whereby students also receive the dean's list (as the top 10 to 15 percent), magna and summa cum laude are usually held in higher regard. A dean's list may therefore be seen as equal to (or more prestigious than) cum laude, depending on the specific requirements involved.

=== Comparison to GPA ===
The dean's list GPA requirements vary from school to school, although there are general standards:

- With the GPA scale from 0 to 4, 4 being an A, the dean's list cutoff is typically around 3.5 to 3.7.
- Top 10 percent of the class in GPA

Some schools maintain two lists for two different levels of GPA. For example, the dean's list records students with at least a 3.5 GPA whereas the chancellor's list records students with a higher 4.0 GPA.

Different from an academic scholarship, the dean's list award does not come with any financial aid. However, students high on the dean's list are often offered extra financial aid, especially if they express a desire to transfer or exhibit more financial need.

=== Comparison to British classifications ===
In the United Kingdom, colleges and universities may utilize variations of the British degree classifications to distinguish students of high scholarship. The classification system as currently used in the United Kingdom, for example, was developed in 1918. The system was implemented based on one from the 16th century, when the Regius Professor of Divinity at the University of Cambridge implemented norm referencing to distinguish the top 25 percent of candidates, the next 50 percent, and the bottom 25 percent.

Today, first-class honours is awarded, by most institutions, to any student that receives a grade of 70 percent or higher (as opposed to classification by class rank). The number of first-class honours degrees has reportedly tripled since the 1990s, and there has been concern over possible grade inflation due to increasing numbers of higher-class honours degrees awarded per annum.

== See also ==
- Class rank
- Valedictorian, the highest-ranking student
- Salutatorian, the second-highest-ranking student
