= Peter Mishler =

American poet

Peter Mishler (born 1980 or 1981) is an American poet and editor. He is the author of the poetry collections Fludde (2018) and Children in Tactical Gear (2024), as well as For All You Do: Self-Care and Encouragement for Teachers (2021), a book for educators. His work has also incorporated music and visual art.

== Life and career ==
Mishler was born in New Jersey and raised in Moorestown, New Jersey, where he graduated from Moorestown High School in 1999. He earned a Bachelor of Fine Arts in literature from Emerson College and both a Masters in English Education and an Masters of Fine Arts in creative writing from Syracuse University. He has served as a contributing editor for Literary Hub.

== Works and reception ==
Mishler's first poetry collection, Fludde, was published by Sarabande Books in 2018 after being selected by Dean Young for the Kathryn A. Morton Prize in Poetry. His second collection, Children in Tactical Gear, was published by the University of Iowa Press in 2024 after winning the Iowa Poetry Prize, selected by Brenda Shaughnessy.

Fludde was reviewed in The Kenyon Review, the Los Angeles Review of Books, Grist, Blackbox Manifold, and The Rupture. It was also selected for The Rumpus Poetry Book Club and included in The Millions' "Must-Read Poetry: May 2018" roundup. In those reviews and features, critics described Fludde as a surrealist work, attentive to childhood, imagination, and memory.

Children in Tactical Gear was reviewed in PREPOSITION and Little Village. The collection was also included in the New York Public Library's list of favorite poetry books of 2024 so far, featured in Poets & Writers' "Page One: Where New and Noteworthy Books Begin," included in The Big Issue's list of books to read for the 2024 U.S. election, and selected by Tom Doig in The Conversation's "Best Books of 2024" roundup. Critics described the book as satirical and sharply focused on consumer culture, violence, and contemporary American life.

== Creative process ==
In a 2023 installment of The Paris Review series "Making of a Poem", Mishler discussed the composition of his poem "My Blockchain", which appeared in the magazine's Winter 2022 issue. Mishler shared hand-written versions of the poem, along with digital folders that chart the development of a single poem over several years. He also noted that the poem was part of a longer poetry manuscript connected to music he was making at the time.
