= Ruth G. King =

American educational psychologist (1933–2025)

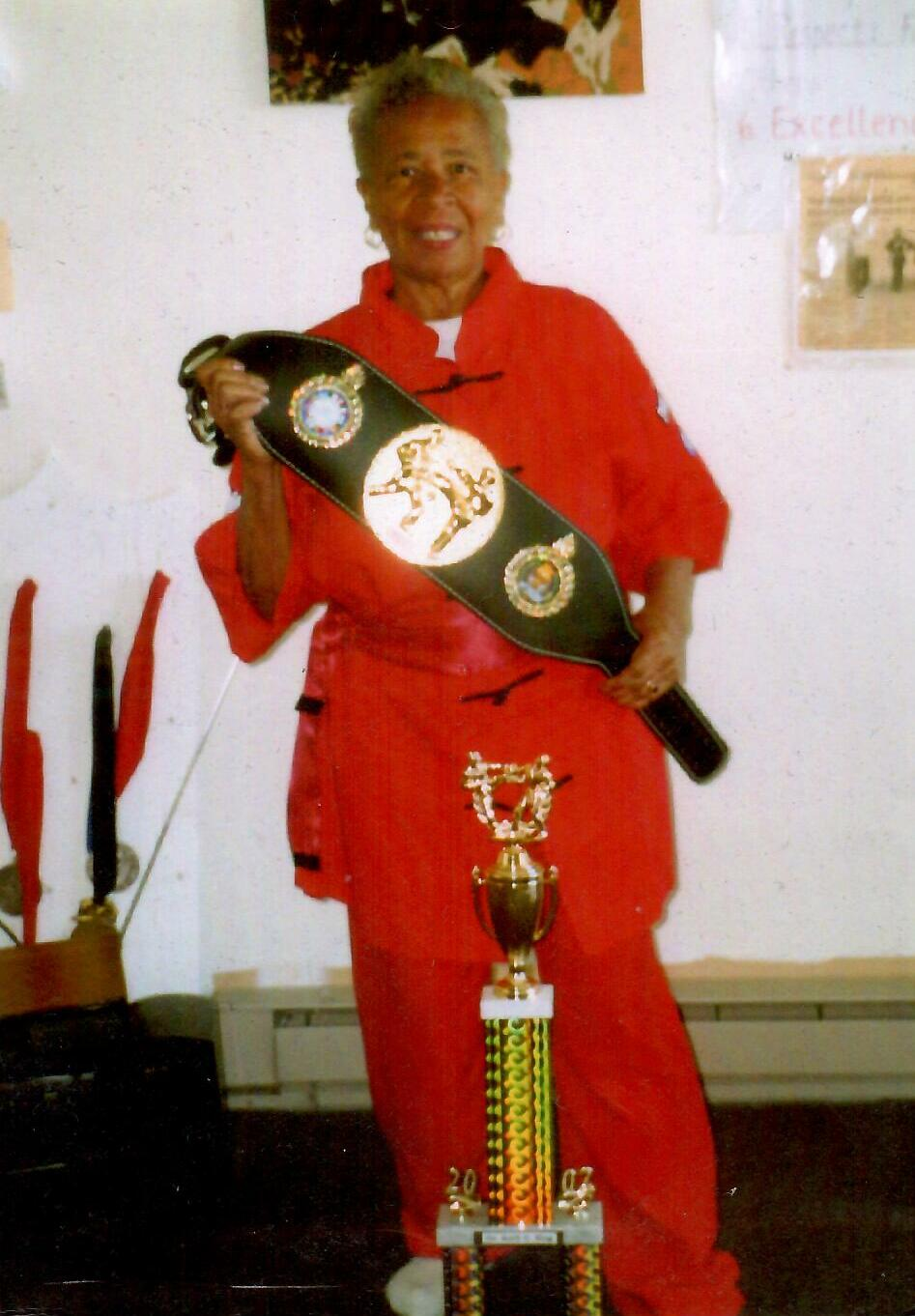
- Ruth G. King displaying an award for tai chi
- Born: Ruthesther Graves; January 28, 1933; Mount Holly, New Jersey, U.S.
- Died: January 12, 2025 (aged 91); Gaithersburg, Maryland, U.S.
- Education: The College of New Jersey; Temple University
- Known for: First woman president of the Association of Black Psychologists; Novels
- Scientific career
- Fields: Educational psychology
- Workplaces: National Guard Bureau; National Training Institute for Community Economic Development; Federal City College; Howard University; Nichols and Associates Inc

Ruth Esther Graves King (January 28, 1933 – January 12, 2025) was an American educational psychologist who was the first female president of the Association of Black Psychologists. Her interest in sports led her to teach physical education. While coaching, she became interested in psychology, gaining a PhD and doctorate in education from Temple University. She has worked for government and community organizations, as well as teaching at Federal City College and Howard University and consulting. She has published two novels, and was married, with two children.

== Early life and education ==
King was born in Mount Holly, New Jersey, the sixth of eight children, five of whom gained doctoral degrees. Her parents were Olive and Henry Graves. King described herself as an athletic tom-boy as a child.

Raised in Moorestown, New Jersey, she attended a segregated elementary school, and graduated from Moorestown High School. In 1956, she earned her Bachelor of Arts (B.A.) in health and physical education from The College of New Jersey (previously Trenton State College). Interested in becoming a journalist, she became editor-in-chief of the college newspaper in her senior year.

King undertook graduate studies in educational psychology at Temple University in Philadelphia. For two of her years at Temple University, she was the only African-American student in the graduate school. She was awarded a Masters in 1970, with a dissertation entitled A case study of critical factors which affect sharing of perceptions in a group situation, and a doctor of education in 1973 with a dissertation entitled A workshop method for improving self-concept of Black youth.

== Career ==
King's first jobs after her undergraduate education were teaching physical education in high schools in New Jersey where she was the only African-American teacher, and later in Philadelphia. Observing players she coached led to her interest in psychology.

After her graduation, King moved to the Washington, D.C., area, where she taught graduate students at Federal City College. She also taught at Howard University. King also served as the Equal Opportunity Director of the National Guard Bureau.

In 1976, she was elected president of the Association of Black Psychologists on her second attempt, the first woman to hold the position. She was the first editor of the Association's news journal, Psych Discourse, established the national office in 1979, and led it for a time. During her presidency of the Association, she liaised with members of Congress (including Shirley Chisholm), in particular pursuing improvements in bias in testing.

In 1988, King served as the project director for the AIDS Information and Education Program created by the Association of Black Psychologists with funding from the Center for Disease Control. This program trained psychologists in an afro-centric model to deliver AIDS education and conduct support groups for Black AIDS patients and their families. In 1989, she testified before the Human Resources Inter-Governmental Sub-Committee, Committee on Government Operations about the programs accomplishments.

King served as vice president of the National Training Institute for Community Economic Development, a government organization providing training to community development organizations. She has also belonged to Health Brain Trust of Congress Black Caucus; the Minority Advisory Committee for Alcohol, Drug Abuse, and Mental Health Administration; the NAACP Education Committee; and Regional Addiction Prevention, Inc. In addition to being a counselor she has also worked for an applied behavioral science company, Nichols and Associates.

King was profiled as one of 50 outstanding black psychologists in 2008.

== Personal life and death ==
Married to Donald F. King in 1959, she has two daughters, and two granddaughters.

King published a novel in 2001. Called The Only One, it had a theme of being a minority in the workplace. In 2006 she published another novel, Mystery in Trilogy.

She has won medals in tai chi. King died on January 12, 2025, at the age of 91.
