= Salutatorian =

Second highest-ranking student in a class

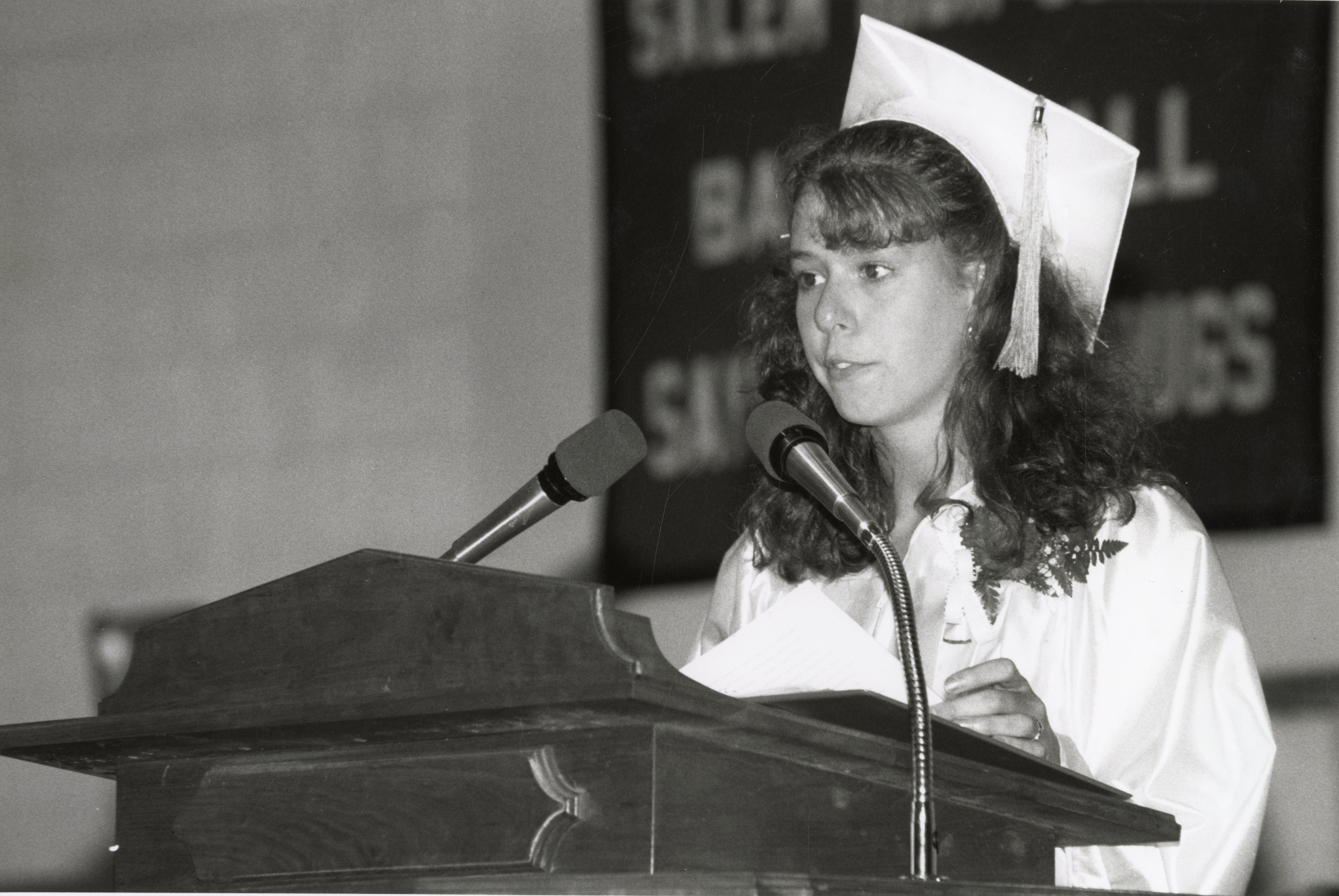
High School Salutatorian, 1992

Salutatorian is an academic title given in Armenia, the Philippines, Canada, Afghanistan and the United States to the second-highest-ranked graduate of the entire graduating class of a specific discipline. Only the valedictorian is ranked higher. This honor is traditionally based on grade point average (GPA) and number of credits taken, but consideration may also be given to other factors such as co-curricular and extracurricular activities. The title comes from the salutatorian's traditional role as the first speaker at a graduation ceremony, delivering the salutation (where the valedictorian, on the other hand, speaks last, delivering the valediction). In a high school setting, a salutatorian may also be asked to speak about the current graduating class or to deliver an invocation or benediction. In some instances, the salutatorian may even deliver an introduction for the valedictorian. The general themes of a salutation and valediction are usually of growth, outlook towards the future, and thankfulness.

== College ==
=== Latin salutatorian ===
At Harvard University and Princeton University, a Latin orator, often a classics major, is chosen for their ability to write and deliver a speech to the audience in that language. At Princeton, this speaker is known as the "Latin salutatorian". At Harvard the Latin oration is called the "Latin Salutatory" and is the first of three student orations, and fulfills the traditional function of salutation. These traditions date from the earliest years of the universities, when all graduates were expected to have attained proficiency in Latin and Greek.

Notable Latin salutatorians at Harvard include T. S. Eliot in 1909 and Erich Segal in 1958.

=== Notable salutatorians ===
- James A. Garfield, the 20th President of the United States (Williams College, Massachusetts, 1856)
- Walter O'Malley, owner of the Brooklyn/Los Angeles Dodgers from 1950 to 1979 (University of Pennsylvania, 1926)
- Aravind Adiga, author, winner of the 2008 Man Booker Prize (Columbia College, Columbia University, 1997)

== Notable high school salutatorians ==
- Bettie Page, pin-up model and Playboy Playmate (Hume-Fogg High School, Tennessee, 1940)
- Evan Mecham, former Governor of Arizona (Altamont High School, Utah, 1942)
- Jesse L. Brown, first African American officer to be killed in the Korean War (Eureka High School, Mississippi, 1944)
- Georgie Anne Geyer, journalist and foreign affairs columnist (Calumet High School, Illinois, 1952)
- Connie Francis, singer (Belleville High School, New Jersey, 1955)
- Robin Roberts, newscaster (Pass Christian High School, Mississippi, 1979)
- Michelle Obama, former First Lady of the United States (Whitney Young High School, Illinois, 1981)
- John Legend, singer-songwriter (North High School, Ohio)
- Carrie Underwood, singer-songwriter (Checotah High School, Oklahoma, 2001)
- Richard Sherman, NFL player for the Seattle Seahawks (Dominguez High School, Compton, California, 2006)
- Norris Cole, basketball player (Dunbar High School, Ohio, 2007)
- Otto Warmbier (Wyoming High School, Wyoming, Ohio, 2013)

== See also ==
- Class rank – Comparative measure of students' performance
- Dean's list – Academic award
- Dux – Roman title
- Grade inflation – Awarding higher grades than deserved
- Hornstine v. Township of Moorestown
- Latin honors – Phrases for levels of academic distinction
- Valedictorian – Highest-ranked graduate
