= Denise Wescott =

American lacrosse coach

Personal information
- Nationality: American

Sport
- Sport: Lacrosse, field hockey, basketball

Denise Wescott is an American lacrosse coach. She has been the head coach of several college women's lacrosse teams, including Delaware, Monmouth, Mount St. Mary's, and Rutgers. Wescott won more than 200 games in her college coaching career. She also coached the Germany women's national lacrosse team. The National Lacrosse Hall of Fame inducted Wescott in 2018.

== Career ==
=== As player ===
Wescott attended Moorestown High School in Moorestown, New Jersey, where she played basketball, field hockey, and lacrosse. Having initially wanted to focus on basketball, she instead decided to stop playing that sport and compete in the others. Named to the All-South Jersey lacrosse team, she was noted as an "aggressive player" and one of the squad's "quickest goalies". She then went to the University of Maryland, where she played for the Maryland Terrapins women's lacrosse and field hockey teams for four seasons. In lacrosse, she was the team's starting goaltender as the Terrapins played in three Association for Intercollegiate Athletics for Women (AIAW) tournaments, making the national final in 1978. In 1980, she made the national All-American team. For her college playing career, she had a 50–11–1 record. In field hockey, the Terrapins reached the 1979 AIAW tournament with Wescott as their regular goalie. Wescott was one of the players named Collegiate Player of the Year by the Field Hockey Club of South Jersey in 1979.

=== As coach ===
After her playing career, Wescott began her career as a coach, with assistant positions at Drew School, Maryland, and Penn State. Wescott was an assistant at Maryland when the team won the 1986 NCAA Division I Women's Lacrosse Championship. The following season, she moved to Penn State, who won the national championship that year. In 1990, Wescott was the head coach at Drew, before coaching lacrosse at Rutgers for two years. She also taught physical education. In 1993, Wescott became coach of the lacrosse team at Delaware. The team won three consecutive America East Conference titles from 1997 to 1999, and she was named the conference coach of the year twice. In 2000, the team appeared in the NCAA Tournament.

From 1994 until 2005, Wescott was also the coach of the German women's national team. In the summer and winter, Wescott traveled overseas to perform her duties for the squad. Wescott left the program after the 2004 season, having led Delaware to 104 wins. During her period as coach of Germany, the team played in eight European Lacrosse Championships and two Women's Lacrosse World Cups, in 2001 and 2005.

From 2005 to 2009, she coached for Mount St. Mary's. She was named the head coach at Monmouth in 2010. She was the program's coach for six seasons, during which it qualified for the NCAA Tournament in 2012 and 2013. Wescott reached 200 career wins in 2014. The following year, she left to become the executive director of Capital Lacrosse Club, a Washington, D.C.–based organization. In 2019, Wescott accepted an assistant position with the California Golden Bears.

== Affiliations and memberships ==
Along with her coaching career, Wescott has worked as a contributor in the game of lacrosse. From 1999 to 2001, she was the president of the Intercollegiate Women's Lacrosse Coaches Association. Beginning in 2005, she has held a position on the World Cup Committee of the FIL; in addition, she has served on the rules committee of the National Collegiate Athletic Association.

== Awards and honors ==
Wescott was inducted into the National Lacrosse Hall of Fame in 2018. By this time, she had surpassed the 200-win mark in her head coaching career. In addition, she is a member of the New Jersey Lacrosse Foundation Hall of Fame.
