= Dereck Faulkner =

German gridiron football player (born 1985)

Profile
- Position: Wide receiver

Personal information
- Born: May 6, 1985 (age 41); Landstuhl, Germany
- Listed height: 6 ft 3 in (1.91 m)
- Listed weight: 220 lb (100 kg)

Career information
- College: Hampton
- NFL draft: 2007: undrafted

Career history
- Philadelphia Eagles (2007); BC Lions (2009)*
- * Offseason or practice squad member only

Dereck Leonard Faulkner (born May 6, 1985) is an American former professional gridiron football wide receiver, business executive, leadership scholar, and nonprofit founder. He played college football for the Hampton Pirates and signed with the Philadelphia Eagles as an undrafted free agent in 2007.

Faulkner earned an MBA from George Washington University and a Ph.D. in Management from Case Western Reserve University's Weatherhead School of Management in 2025. He is the founder of the Athletes for Vets Foundation and has remained active in business, philanthropy, leadership research, and former-player advocacy.

Faulkner has also been a member of the BC Lions.

== Early life ==
Faulkner grew up in Moorestown, New Jersey and played high school football at Moorestown High School, where he was a First-team All-State wide receiver. He also earned All-County, All-Conference Accolades as well as All-South Jersey Honors after catching 40 passes for 898 yards (22.5 avg) and nine touchdowns his senior season. Ranked the #1 wide receiver in Southern New Jersey. Super Prep rated him among the top 100 players on the East Coast. He chose Hampton University over the University of Iowa.

== College career ==
Faulkner immediately earned playing time as a true freshman at the "X" receiver position. Despite playing behind current All-Pro Kick Returner current Houston Texans Jerome Mathis, Faulkner still finished second on the team with 20 receptions for 249 yards and 1 touchdown in 10 games. 17 of those catches resulted in first downs, with 12 of those coming on third down plays. A strained calf muscle limited Faulkner to 9 games in 2005. He still contributed to the team by pulling in 24 catches for 427 yards and 3 touchdowns, finishing third on the team, showing his prowess as the team clutch third-down receiver. He helped convert 12 third-down plays finishing with a total of 22 first down receptions. He suffered a broken right fibula during practice in the fourth week of the season and only played in 13 games over his last two seasons at Hampton. He finished his career with 74 catches for 1,011 yards.

== Professional career ==
=== Philadelphia Eagles ===
After going undrafted in the 2007 NFL draft, Faulkner signed with the Philadelphia Eagles as an undrafted free agent on April 30, 2007. The signing brought the South Jersey native back to the Philadelphia area, where he had grown up following the Eagles.

Faulkner competed for a roster position at wide receiver during the Eagles' 2007 training camp and preseason under head coach Andy Reid. During camp, The Philadelphia Inquirer identified Faulkner as "the star of the morning practice" following one of the team's training sessions.

Former Eagles All-Pro wide receiver Mike Quick, a longtime family friend and mentor, played an influential role in Faulkner's development as a wide receiver and his pursuit of professional football.

=== British Columbia Lions ===
Faulkner was signed by the BC Lions on April 8, 2009.

== Personal ==
Faulkner earned a bachelor's degree in Business Management from Hampton University, an MBA from George Washington University, and a Ph.D. in Management from Case Western Reserve University's Weatherhead School of Management. His father played college football as a linebacker at Virginia State University. Following his playing career, Faulkner remained active in former-player leadership and advocacy. He was elected president of the National Football League Players Association (NFLPA) Former Players New York/New Jersey Chapter and was also elected to serve on the NFLPA Former Player Advisory Board, representing the interests and concerns of former NFL players.

Faulkner is a member of Omega Psi Phi, having been initiated through the Gamma Epsilon chapter at Hampton University.
