= Moorestown Township Public Schools =

School district in Burlington County, New Jersey, US

Address
- 803 North Stanwick Road Moorestown, Burlington County, New Jersey, 08057; United States
- Coordinates: 39.983044°N 74.943329°W

District information
- Grades: Pre-K to 12
- Superintendent: Courtney McNeely
- Business administrator: James Heiser
- Schools: 6

Students and staff
- Enrollment: 3,884 (as of 2022–23)
- Faculty: 345.5 FTEs
- Student–teacher ratio: 11.2:1

Other information
- District Factor Group: I
- Website: www.mtps.com
Ind.	Per pupil	District spending	Rank (*)	K-12 average	%± vs. average
1A	Total Spending	$17,902	42	$18,891	−5.2%
1	Budgetary Cost	14,175	45	14,783	−4.1%
2	Classroom Instruction	8,393	37	8,763	−4.2%
6	Support Services	2,569	72	2,392	7.4%
8	Administrative Cost	1,279	24	1,485	−13.9%
10	Operations & Maintenance	1,453	30	1,783	−18.5%
13	Extracurricular Activities	424	102	268	58.2%
16	Median Teacher Salary	59,610	27	64,043
Data from NJDoE 2014 Taxpayers' Guide to Education Spending. *Of K-12 districts with more than 3,500 students. Lowest spending=1; Highest=103

The Moorestown Township Public Schools (MTPS) is a comprehensive community public school district that serves students in pre-kindergarten through twelfth grade from Moorestown, in Burlington County, in the U.S. state of New Jersey.

As of the 2022–23 school year, the district, comprising six schools, had an enrollment of 3,884 students and 345.5 classroom teachers (on an FTE basis), for a student–teacher ratio of 11.2:1.

Notably, the district was part of a lawsuit in 2003 called Hornstine v. Township of Moorestown over attempted policy changes made by Moorestown High School.

== History ==
In 1948, during de jure educational segregation in the United States, the district had separate elementary and junior high schools for white children and a combined such school for black children. The school for black children lacked language and mathematics courses offered at the white junior high school which meant, according to Noma Jensen of the Journal of Negro Education, black entrants to the high school were unable to get into science nor classical education streams as their prior education rendered entry "virtually impossible".

The district had been classified by the New Jersey Department of Education as being in District Factor Group "I", the second-highest of eight groupings. District Factor Groups organize districts statewide to allow comparison by common socioeconomic characteristics of the local districts. From lowest socioeconomic status to highest, the categories are A, B, CD, DE, FG, GH, I and J.

== Awards and recognition ==
For the 1991-92 school year, George C. Baker Elementary School was recognized with the National Blue Ribbon Award of Excellence from the United States Department of Education, the highest honor that an American school can achieve. Moorestown High School was recognized as a Blue Ribbon School for the 1999-2000 school year.

== Schools ==
Schools in the district (with 2022–23 enrollment data from the National Center for Education Statistics) are:

Elementary schools

- George C. Baker Elementary School with 397 students in grades PreK–3
  - Shelly Rowe, principal
- Mary E. Roberts Elementary School with 313 students in grades PreK–3
  - Brian Carter, principal
- South Valley Elementary School with 392 students in grades PreK–3
  - Heather Hackl, principal
- Moorestown Upper Elementary School with 853 students in grades 4–6
  - Susan Powell, principal

Middle school

- William Allen Middle School with 616 students in grades 7–8
  - Cheryl Carravano, principal

High school

- Moorestown High School with 1,267 students in grades 9–12
  - Andrew Seibel, principal

== Administration ==
Core members of the district's administration are:

- Courtney McNeely, superintendent
- James Heiser, business administrator and board secretary

The school district has had several superintendents, acting superintendents and interim superintendents over the span of a decade. John Bach retired in 2012 after being the superintendent for five years. Brian Betze started as superintendent in July 2012 and would resign after one year in the job. After that, Lynn Shugars, the district's business administrator at the time, would serve as acting superintendent. Timothy Rehm would then be hired as interim superintendent in February 2014 and then became the permanent superintendent. He resigned in October 2015. Carole Butler, the district's Director of Curriculum and Instruction, would serve as acting superintendent. Despite community support for her becoming the permanent superintendent, Scott McCartney was hired for the job in 2016. McCartney would retire in June 2021 and Leonard Fitts became the interim superintendent until Michael Volpe became the next permanent superintendent in December. Volpe resigned after only one year to become superintendent in his hometown of Hillsborough. Joseph Bollendorf, who had recently retired as the superintendent in Washington Township in Gloucester County, would then become the interim superintendent in Moorestown, serving until January 2025 when Courtney McNeely, the superintendent of the Pittsgrove Township School District, was hired as the next permanent superintendent.

== Board of education ==
The district's board of education, composed of nine members, sets policy and oversees the fiscal and educational operation of the district through its administration. As a Type II school district, the board's trustees are elected directly by voters to serve three-year terms of office on a staggered basis, with three seats up for election each year held (since 2012) as part of the November general election. The board appoints a superintendent to oversee the district's day-to-day operations and a business administrator to supervise the business functions of the district.
