= Valedictorian =

Highest-ranked graduate

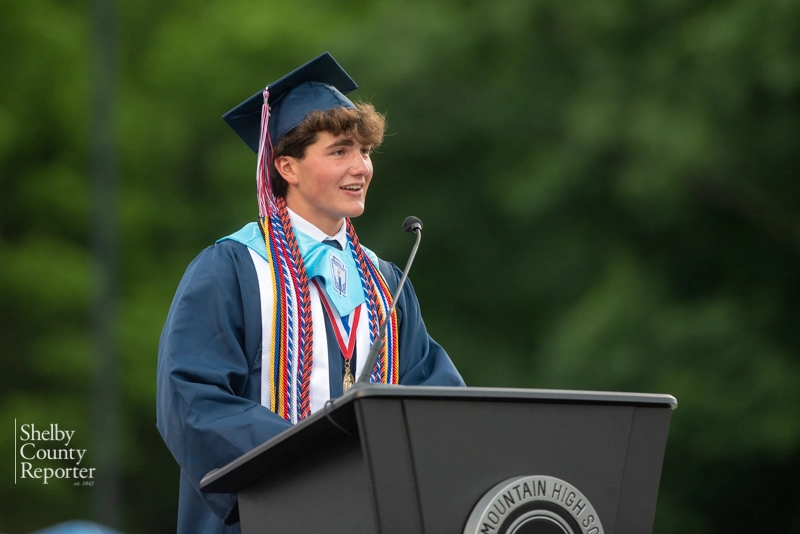
A valedictorian giving his valediction (farewell speech) at commencement

Valedictorian is an academic title for the highest-performing student of a graduating class of an academic institution in the United States and Canada.

The valedictorian is generally determined by an academic institution's grade point average (GPA) system, but other methods of selection may be factored in such as volunteer work, scholastic awards, research, and extra-curricular activity.

== Origin ==
The term is an Anglicised derivation of the Latin vale dicere ("to say farewell"), historically rooted in the valedictorian's traditional role as the final speaker at the graduation ceremony commencement before the students receive their diplomas. The valedictory address, also known as the valediction, is generally considered a final farewell to classmates, before they disperse to pursue their individual paths after graduating.

=== Other terms ===
The term is mostly used in the United States, Canada, and the Philippines, but other countries around the world have opted to start using the term such as Nigeria. Some countries may also award equivalent titles. In Australia, the title is sometimes awarded to a member of a graduating university class on the basis of a contribution to the school rather than academic success. The highest-ranking student in a graduating class is often referred to as dux (Latin for 'leader'), and may or may not give a speech. In France the term Major de promotion ('first in class') is used, although the term is not related to any ceremonial role, as there are rarely graduation ceremonies in schools or universities.

== Selection ==
The most common method of selection is typically based upon the highest grade point average. Some institutions such as those in Canada confer the title on the class member chosen to deliver the final graduation address, regardless of the speaker's academic credentials. Historically and traditionally, however, schools confer the title upon the top ranked graduate of the class, whether determined by GPA or some other means such as a faculty vote, who thereby earns the honor of delivering the valedictory address.

Some institutions award the title based upon various criteria such as an overall academic record of grades and credits, a student's grade point average, the level of rigor within a student's academic program of studies, a vote by school administrators, the level of participation in and dedication to extracurricular activities, and one's public-speaking skills and abilities. In other schools, the position may be elected by the school body or appointed directly by the school administration based on various systems of merit. Some schools may feature "co-valedictorians" in lieu of conferring the title on a single individual from among the graduating class. This may occur in the case of a numerical tie in grade point averages, as part of a Latin honors system.

=== Controversy ===
The awarding of the valedictorian honor can be controversial. Often the differences separating the top student from the nearest competitors are small, and sometimes there are accusations that the winner took advantage of the rules in a way that seemed unfair, such as taking easy courses to get additional credits. Some schools have dropped the honor or changed the rules to allow multiple recipients. In turn, such changes have led to complaints that it is unfair to change the rules after a competition has begun. The New Jersey Commissioner of Education, for example, required schools to make changes to valedictorian award policy effective only for the incoming freshman class, not students already enrolled.

In 2003, a New Jersey case raised the question of whether accommodations for students under the Individuals with Disabilities Education Act and related laws should affect valedictorian honors. In Hornstine v. Township of Moorestown, a U.S. District Court judge blocked the Moorestown Superintendent of Schools from retroactively changing school policy to deny a disabled student sole honors. While those who do well in school often find success in university and professional life, one study claimed to show that valedictorians were not any more likely to excel at a global scale than other students, with the argument being made that those with passions for subjects are more likely to excel, yet those same students tend to find it more difficult to work hard at subjects that they are not interested in.

== Valedictory address ==
The valedictory address, or valediction, is the closing or farewell statement delivered at a graduation ceremony. It is an oration at commencement (in Canada, called convocation in university and graduation in high school) exercises in U.S. and some Canadian high schools, colleges, and universities delivered by one of the graduates. The mode of discourse generally is inspirational and persuasive. The various aims of this address are to inspire the graduates and to thank individuals responsible for their successes while reflecting on youthful frivolity and the accomplishments of the class. Above all, however, the primary aim of the valedictory address is to allow a representative of the graduating class to bid a final farewell to the students and to the school, as the graduates prepare to disperse and to begin the next phase of their lives.

== See also ==
- Salutatorian
- Dean's list
- Grade inflation
- Senior Wrangler
