= Grade inflation =

Awarding higher grades than deserved

Grade inflation (also known as grading leniency) is the general awarding of higher grades for the same quality of work over time, which devalues grades. However, higher average grades in themselves do not prove grade inflation. For this to be grade inflation, it is necessary to demonstrate that the quality of work does not deserve the high grade.

Grade inflation is frequently discussed in relation to education in the United States, and Canada, Australia, New Zealand, France, Poland, Germany, Turkey, South Korea, Japan, China, and India.

== Arguments ==
=== Arguments for limiting grade inflation ===
- It reduces the incentive for bright students to excel, since mediocre work increasingly qualifies for top grades.
- It undermines the corrective feedback function of grading.
- It is not uniform between schools. This places students in more stringently graded schools and departments at an unfair disadvantage, unless employers take into account a school's ranking.
- It is not uniform among disciplines.
- It makes it more difficult to compare students who took their exams at different times.
- Prospective employers must rely on indicators other than grades, such as internships and work experience, in order to gauge a graduate's skill level and attitude.
- Degrees become less valuable.
- It can give students a false sense of knowledge and accomplishments if they do not realize that they do not deserve the high grade.
- In situations where specific competencies are required to ensure safety, grade inflation may cause harm.

=== Arguments against limiting grade inflation ===
- Higher grades at some schools may reflect better performance than others (although with no national standard, there can be no way to compare one school to another by grades).
- Although grade inflation does not evenly distribute through departments, it is arguable due to the subjective nature of grades, that interdepartmental grading practices were not equal in the first place (e.g. how is one supposed to determine the equivalent grade for an English course to an A grade in physics?)
- It can motivate students of average ability to invest in an academic degree, instead of learning a skilled trade at a vocational school.

== Ratings inflation ==
Grade inflation is a specific instance of a broader phenomenon of ratings or reputation inflation where rating decisions are made by individuals. This has been occurring in peer-to-peer services such as Uber.

== In the United States ==
=== At the secondary level ===
Data from the ACT show that, since 2016, and particularly during the COVID-19 restrictions, grade inflation in secondary schools has sharply accelerated. Most students taking the ACT have claimed to be labelled as "A" students by their high schools. Despite apparently impressive GPAs on ACT registration forms, the average scores have fallen since 2012. Data from the Department of Education, and the National Assessment of Educational Progress have also found strong evidence of grade inflation and declining achievement.

=== At the post-secondary level ===
Louis Goldman, professor at Wichita State University, states that an increase of .404 points was reported from a survey in 134 colleges from 1965 to 1973. A second study in 180 colleges, showed a .432 GPA increase from 1960 to 1974, both indicating grade inflation.

Stuart Rojstaczer, a retired geophysics professor at Duke University, has collected historical data from over 400 four-year schools, in some cases dating back to the 1920s, showing evidence of nationwide grade inflation over time, and regular differences between classes of schools and departments.

Harvey Mansfield, a professor of government at Harvard University, argues that just denying the existence of grading inflation at Harvard proves that the problem is serious. He states that students are given easy grades by some professors to be popular, and these professors will be forgotten; only the ones challenging students will be remembered.

Main historical trends identified include:

- a divergence in average grades between public and private institutions, starting in the 1950s;
- a widespread sharp rise in grades from the mid-1960s to mid-1970s (Vietnam War years);
- relatively little change in grades from the mid-1970s to mid-1980s;
- a slow rise in grades from the mid-1980s to present.

Until recently, the evidence for grade inflation in the US has been sparse, largely anecdotal, and sometimes even contradictory; firm data on this issue was not abundant, nor was it easily attainable or amenable for analysis. National surveys in the 1990s generally showed rising grades at American colleges and universities, but a 1995 survey of college transcripts by Clifford Adelman, a senior research analyst in the U.S. Department of Education, found that grades declined slightly in the 1970s and 1980s. Data for American high schools were lacking.

Recent data leave little doubt that grades are rising at American colleges, universities and high schools. An evaluation of grading practices in US colleges and universities written in 2003, shows that since the 1960s, grades in the US have risen at a rate of 0.15 per decade on a 4.0 scale. The study included over 80 institutions with a combined enrollment of over 1,000,000 students. An annual national survey of college freshmen indicates that students are studying less in high school, yet an increasing number report high school grades of A− or better. Studies are being made in order to determine who is more likely to inflate grades, and why an instructor would inflate a grade.

A 2021 study from the National Bureau of Economic Research has found a significant drop in completion rates between 1970 and 1990, particularly among male students. From 1990 to the present, the study has found a more-or-less steady improvement in completion rates. However, first-year students are no better prepared for college level studies than their predecessors from 1990. Similarly, the quality of instruction provided by colleges has also seen no improvement since 1990. The only plausible explanation for improved completion rates is grade inflation. A 2022 study linked grade inflation to rising graduation rates in the United States since the 1990s because GPA strongly predicts graduation.

==== Princeton University ====
In an attempt to combat the grade inflation prevalent at many top US institutions, Princeton began in the autumn of 2004 to employ guidelines for grading distributions across departments. Under the new guidelines, departments have been encouraged to re-evaluate and clarify their grading policies. The administration suggests that, averaged over the course of several years in an individual department, A-range grades should constitute 35% of grades in classroom work, and 55% of grades in independent work such as Senior Theses. These guidelines are enforced by the academic departments. Since the policy's inception, A-range grades have declined significantly in Humanities departments, while remaining nearly constant in the Natural Science departments, which were typically at or near the 35% guideline already.

In 2009, it was confirmed that the policy implemented in 2004 had brought undergraduate grades within the ranges targeted by the initiative. In 2008–09, A grades (A+, A, A−) accounted for 39.7% of grades in undergraduate courses across the university, the first time that A grades have fallen below 40% since the policy was approved. The results were in marked contrast to those from 2002 to 2003, when As accounted for a high of 47.9% of all grades.

Deflation has varied by division, with the social sciences and natural sciences largely holding steady for the last four years. During that period, A grades have ranged from 37.1 to 37.9% in the social sciences and from 35.1 to 35.9% in the natural sciences. In the humanities and engineering, where deflation has been slower, 2008–09 brought significant movement. A's accounted for 42.5% of grades in the humanities last year and 40.6% of grades in engineering, both down two percentage points compared to 2007–08. In the period from fall 2006 through spring 2009, the most recent three-year period under the new grading policy, A's accounted for 40.1% of grades in undergraduate courses, down from 47.0% in 2001–04, the three years before the faculty adopted the policy. The 2006–09 results also mark continued deflation from those reported a year ago, when A's accounted for 40.4% of undergraduate grades in the 2005–08 period. In humanities departments, A's accounted for 44.1% of the grades in undergraduate courses in 2006–09, down from 55.6% in 2001–04. In the social sciences, there were 37.7% A grades in 2006–09, down from 43.3% in 2001–04. In the natural sciences, there were 35.6% A grades in 2006–09, compared to 37.2% in 2001–04. In engineering, the figures were 41.7% A's in 2006–09, down from 50.2% in 2001–04.

==== Harvard University ====
Grade inflation is often equated with lax academic standards. For example, the following quote about lax standards from a Harvard University report in 1894 has been used to claim that grade inflation has been a longstanding issue: "Grades A and B are sometimes given too readily—Grade A for work of not very high merit, and Grade B for work not far above mediocrity. ... insincere students gain passable grades by sham work." Issues of standards in American education have been longstanding.

Harvard graduate and professor Harvey Mansfield is a longtime vocal opponent of grade inflation at his alma mater. In 2013, Mansfield, after hearing from a dean that "the most frequent grade is an A", claimed to give students two grades: one for their transcript, and the one he thinks they deserve. He commented, "I didn't want my students to be punished by being the only ones to suffer for getting an accurate grade". In response, Nathaniel Stein published a satirical "leaked" grading rubric in The New York Times, which included such grades as an A++ and A+++, or "A+ with garlands".

==== University of Alabama ====
The University of Alabama has been cited as a recent case of grade inflation. In 2003, Robert Witt, president of the university, responded to criticism that his administration encouraged grade inflation on campus by shutting down access to the records of the Office of Institutional Research, which, until that year, had made grade distribution data freely available. It is, however, still available on the Greek Affairs website. The Alabama Scholars Organization, and its newspaper, the Alabama Observer, had been instrumental in exposing the situation and recommending that the Witt administration adopt public accountability measures. The paper had revealed that several departments awarded more than 50 percent "A"s in introductory courses and that one department, Women's Studies, handed out 90 percent "A"s (the vast majority of those being "A+"). Grades had grown consistently higher during the period examined, from 1973 to 2003.

==== UC campuses ====
UC Berkeley has a reputation for rigorous grading policies. UC Berkeley College of Engineering guidelines state that no more than 17% of the students in any given class may be awarded A grades, and that the class GPA should be in the range of 2.7 to 2.9 out of a maximum of 4.0 grade points. Some departments, however, are not adhering to such strict guidelines, as data from the UCB's Office of Student Research indicates that the average overall undergraduate GPA was about 3.25 in 2006. Other campuses have stricter grading policies. For example, the average undergraduate GPA of UC San Diego is 3.05, and fewer students have GPA > 3.5 in science majors. UC Irvine's average GPA is 3.01.

==== Saint Anselm College ====
A small liberal arts college in New Hampshire, Saint Anselm College has received national attention and recognition for attempting to buck the trend of grade inflation seen on the campuses of many American colleges and universities. At Saint Anselm, the top 25% of the class has a 3.1 GPA; the median grade at the college is around a 2.50 GPA. Some professors and administrators believe that inflating grades makes it harder for students to realize their academic strengths and weaknesses and may encourage students to take classes based on grade expectation. The practice also makes it harder for parents and students to determine whether or not the grade was earned. Because of this, at Saint Anselm College, a curriculum committee was set up in 1980 to meet with the academic dean and review the grading policies on a monthly basis. This committee fights the practice of inflation by joining the administration and faculty in an effort to mend them into a working force against grade inflation. The former president of the college, Father Jonathan DeFelice, is quoted as saying, "I cannot speak for everyone, but if I'm headed for the operating room, I will take the surgeon who earned his or her "A" the honest way," in support of Saint Anselm's stringent grading system.

==== Other post-secondary institutions ====
Other colleges such as Caltech, MIT, Harvey Mudd College, Washington and Lee University, University of Rochester, Middlebury College,The College of William and Mary, Fordham University, Swarthmore College, Bates College, Cornell University, the University of Chicago and Boston University are also known for their rigorous grading practices. However, data indicate that even schools known for their traditionally rigorous grading practices have experienced grade inflation and these claims may now be overstated. Washington and Lee had an average GPA of 3.27 in 2006 and Swarthmore's graduates had a mean GPA of 3.24 in 1997. To clarify the grades on its graduates' transcripts, Reed College includes a card, the current edition of which reports that "The average GPA for all students in 2013–14 was 3.15 on a 4.00 scale. This figure has increased by less than 0.2 of a grade point in the past 30 years. During that period, only eleven students have graduated from Reed with perfect 4.00 grade averages." Wellesley College implemented a maximum per-class grade cap of 3.33 in 2004, though professors could award a higher average grade by filing a written explanation. Grades lowered to comply with the cap, and student evaluations of professors also lowered. The number of students majoring in economics increased and other social sciences decreased though this may have been part of larger general trends at the time.

=== At the elementary/junior/senior level ===
==== Pittsburgh School District ====
A January 7, 2009 article in the Pittsburgh Post-Gazette used the term "grade inflation" to describe how some people viewed a grading policy in the Pittsburgh School District. According to the article, the policy sets 50% as the minimum score that a student can get on any given school assignment. The article also stated that some students said they would rather get a score of 50% than do the school work. A March 2, 2009 follow-up article in the same newspaper said that the policy had been amended so that students who refuse to do the work will receive a grade of zero, and that the minimum grade of 50% will only apply to students who make a "good-faith effort". A March 3, 2009, article in the same newspaper quoted Bill Hileman, a Pittsburgh Federation of Teachers staff representative, as saying, "The No. 1 problem with the 50 percent minimum was the negative impact on student behavior." The same article also said that the school district was planning to adopt a new grading scale in at least two schools by the end of the month. The article stated that under the original grading scale, the minimum scores required to earn an A, B, C, D, or F, were, respectively, 90%, 80%, 70%, 60%, and 0%. Under the new 5-point grading scale, the minimum scores required to earn an A, B, C, D, or F would be changed, respectively, to 4.0, 3.0, 2.0, 1.0, and 0.

== In Canada ==
=== At the secondary school level ===
==== Ontario ====
James Côté and Anton L. Allahar, both professors of sociology at the University of Western Ontario conducted a rigorous empirical study of grade inflation in Canada, particularly of the province of Ontario. Up until the 1960s, grading in Ontario had been borne out of the British system, in which no more than 5% of students were given As, and 30% given Bs. In the 1960s, average performers in Ontario were C-students, while A-students were considered exceptional. As of 2007, 90% of Ontario students have a B average or above. In Ontario, high school grades began to rise with the abolition of province-wide standardized exams in 1967.

The abolition of province-wide exams meant that student marks were entirely assigned by individual teachers. In 1983, 38% of students registering in universities had an average that was higher than 80%. By 1992, this figure was 44%. According to the Council of Ontario Universities, 52.6% of high school graduates applying to Ontario universities in 1995 had an A average. In 2004, this figure had risen 61%. In 1995, 9.4 percent of high school graduates reported an A+ average. In 2003, this figure had risen to a high of 14.9%. The average grade of university applicants was 80% in 1997, and this percentage has steadily increased each year since.

In 2004, Quebec's McGill University admitted that students from Ontario were given a higher cutoff grade than students from other provinces, because of concerns about grade inflation originating from the fact that Ontario does not have standardized provincial testing as a key component of high school graduation requirements.

==== Atlantic Canada ====
In 2007, the Atlantic Institute for Market Studies released a report on grade inflation in Atlantic Canada. Mathematics scores in New Brunswick francophone high schools indicate that teacher-assigned marks are inflated in relation to marks achieved on provincial exams. It was found that the average school marks and the average provincial exam were discordant. When looking at marks for school years 2001–2002 to 2003–2004, it was found that school marks in all 21 high schools were higher than the provincial exam marks. The provincial average for school marks is 73.7% while the average for provincial exams marks is 60.1% over the three years. School marks in all 21 high schools were higher than the provincial exam marks.

In the context of provincial exams and teacher assigned grades, grade inflation is defined as the difference between the teacher-assigned marks and the results on a provincial exam for that particular course. It was found that higher grade inflation points to lower provincial exam results. Of the 21 high schools, École Marie-Gaëtane had the highest grade inflation, at 24.7%. With a provincial exam average of 52.3% this school is also the least achieving school in the province. In contrast, schools Polyvalente Louis-J-Robichaud, Polyvalente Mathieu-Martin, École Grande-Rivière and Polyvalente Roland-Pépin had the lowest grade inflation with values ranging from −0.7% to 9.3%. They were the four top performing schools on the grade 11 mathematics provincial exams. Similar results were found for Anglophone New Brunswick high schools, as well as for Newfoundland and Labrador schools. Despite the high marks assigned by teachers, Atlantic Canadian high school students have consistently ranked poorly in pan Canadian and international assessments.

==== British Columbia ====
In 2008, in British Columbia, the University of Victoria (UVic) and the University of British Columbia (UBC) reduced the number of Grade 12 provincial exams that high school students were required to write in order to gain admission to those universities. Prior to 2008, high school students applying to UVic and UBC were required to write 4 provincial exams, including Grade 12 English. In 2008, this standard was reduced so that students were only required to write the provincial exam for Grade 12 English. A UVic administrator claimed that the rationale for this reduction in standards is that it allows the university to better compete with central Canadian universities (i.e. Ontario and Québec universities) for students, and prevent enrollment from falling. Universities in central Canada do not require high school students to write provincial exams, and can offer early admission based on class marks alone. A Vancouver high school principal criticized the change in requirements by charging that it would become difficult to detect grade inflation. The president of the University Presidents' Council of British Columbia also criticized the move and said the provincial exams are "the great equalizer". The British Columbia Teachers Federation supported the change because in the past some students avoided certain subjects for fear that poor marks on provincial exams would bring down their average.

In the fall of 2009, Simon Fraser University (SFU) changed its requirements so that high school students only need to pass the English 12 provincial exam. Previously, students were required to pass 4 provincial exams, including English 12, in order to apply. This change brought SFU into line with UVic and UBC. Administrators claimed that this reduction of standards was necessary so that SFU could better compete with UBC and UVic for students. The change was criticized on the ground that it leads to "a race to the bottom".

==== Alberta ====
As of 2007, 40% of Ontario high school graduates leave with A averages – 8 times as many as would be awarded in the traditional British system. In Alberta, as of 2007, just over 20% of high school graduates leave with an A average. This discrepancy may be explained that all Alberta high school students must write province-wide standardized exams, Diploma exams, in core subjects, in order to graduate. Diploma exams reuse some questions from year to year in order to calibrate the grading average, taking into account that some years may have weaker or stronger students and that this should be reflected in lower or higher grades.

The Alberta Diploma exams are given in grade 12, covering core subjects such as biology, chemistry, English, math, physics and social studies. The exams are worth 30 percent of a grade 12 student's final mark. Quebec also requires its students to write Diploma Exams for graduating students. Saskatchewan, Manitoba, and Nova Scotia have similar tests. However, many of these provinces are currently in the process of getting rid of these exams, with Manitoba already removing these provincial examinations. British Columbia has a mandatory English proficiency test in grade 12, provincial tests in other subjects are optional.

Alberta's focus on standardized exams keeps grade inflation in check, but can put Albertan high school students at a disadvantage relative to students in other provinces. However, Alberta has the highest standards in Canada and produces students who are among the best in international comparisons. By preventing grade inflation, Albertan high schools have been able to greatly ameliorate the problem of compressing students with different abilities into the same category (i.e. inflating grades so that a student in the 98th percentile, for example, cannot be distinguished from one in the 82nd percentile).

=== At the post-secondary level ===
In relation to grade inflation at the university level, the research of the aforementioned Professors Côté and Allahar concluded that: "We find significant evidence of grade inflation in Canadian universities in both historical and comparative terms, as well as evidence that it is continuing beyond those levels at some universities so as to be comparable with levels found in some American universities. It is also apparent that the inflated grades at Canadian universities are now taken for granted as normal, or as non-inflated, by many people, including professors who never knew the traditional system, have forgotten it, or are in denial".

A 2000 study of grade patterns over 20 years at seven Ontario universities (Brock, Guelph, McMaster, Ottawa, Trent, Wilfrid Laurier and Windsor) found that grade point averages rose in 11 of 12 arts and sciences courses between 1973–74 and 1993–94. In addition, it was found that a higher percentage of students received As and Bs and fewer got Cs, Ds and Fs.

==== University of Toronto ====
A 2006 study by the Canadian Undergraduate Survey Consortium released earlier in 2007 found students at the University of Toronto Scarborough got lower marks on average than their counterparts at Carleton University and Ryerson University. Marking, not ability, was determined to be the reason.

==== University of Waterloo ====
In 2009 a presentation by Greg Mayer on Grade Inflation at the University of Waterloo reported that grade inflation was occurring there. The study initially stated that there was "no consensus on how Grade Inflation is defined ... I will define GI as an increase in grades in one or more academic departments over time". From 1988/89 to 2006/07 it was determined that there had been an 11.02% increase in undergraduate A grades, with the rate of increase being 0.656% per year. In 100 level Math for the year 2006/07, the grade distribution of 11,042 assigned grades was: 31.9% A, 22.0% B, 18%C, 16.3% D, 11.8% F. In 400 level Fine Arts courses for 2006/07, the distribution of 50 assigned grades was: 100% A. In relation to increased scores in first-year mathematics, there was no evidence of better preparedness of UW students. A possible source of grade inflation may have been pressure from administrators to raise grades. A case was documented in which a math dean adjusted grades without the consent or authorization of the instructor.

When comparing the 1988–1993 school years with that of the years from 2002 to 2007, it was discovered that the percentage of As assigned in 400 levels in the Faculty of Arts had risen as follows for every department (first figure is percentage of As for 1988–1993 years, second is percentage of As for 2002–2007 years): Music 65%/93%, Fine Art 51%/84%, Sociology 54%/73%, History 66%/71%, Philosophy 63%/69%, Anthropology 63%/68%, Drama 39%/63%, Political Science 46%/57%, English 43%/57%, French 39%/56%, Economics 36%/51%, Business 28%/47%, Psychology 80%/81%. This study examined only 400-level courses and conclusions regarding grade inflation should not be generalized to courses at other levels.

== In the United Kingdom ==
Annual grade inflation has been a continuing feature of the UK public examination system for several decades. In April 2012 Glenys Stacey, the chief executive of Ofqual, the UK public examinations regulator, acknowledged its presence and announced a series of measures to restrict further grade devaluation.

=== GCSE ===
Since the turn of the millennium the percentage of pupils obtaining 5 or more good GCSEs has increased by about 30%, while independent tests performed as part of the OECD PISA and IES TIMSS studies have reported Literacy, Maths and Science scores in England and Wales having fallen by about 6%, based on their own tests.

Between 1975, with the introduction of the national alphabetic grades to the O-Level, and the replacement of both the O-Level and CSE with the GCSE, in 1988, approximately 36% of pupils entered for a Mathematics exam sat the O-Level and 64% the CSE paper. With grades allocated on a normative basis with approximately ~53% (10% A, 15% B, 25–30% C) obtaining a C or above at O-Level, and 10% the O-Level C equivalent Grade 1 CSE; a proportion being entered for neither paper. The percentage of the population obtaining at least a grade "C" or equivalent in maths, at O-level, remained fixed in 22–26% band.

Note: Historically an:

- O Level A-C grade was awarded to the top ~50–58% of each O-Level cohort, comprising the top ~28% of 16-year-olds
- CSE Grade 1 was awarded to the top ~10% of each CSE cohort, comprising the next ~50–55% of 16-year-olds, in common subjects.
- CSE Grade 4 was awarded to candidates of average / median ability.

With the replacement of the previous exams with the GCSE and a move from a normative to a criterion referencing grade system, reliant on examiner judgement, the percentage obtaining at least a grade C, in mathematics, has risen to 58.4%, in 2012.

An analysis of the GCSE awards to pupils achieving the average YELLIS ability test score of 45, between 1996 and 2006, identified a general increase in awards over the 10 years, ranging from 0.2 (Science) to 0.8 (Maths) of a GCSE grade.

It has also been suggested that the incorporation of GCSE awards into school league tables, and the setting of School level targets, at above national average levels of attainment, may be a driver of GCSE grade inflation. At the time of introduction the E grade was intended to equivalent to the CSE grade 4, and so obtainable by a candidate of average/median ability; Sir Keith Joseph set Schools a target to have 90% of their pupil obtain a minimum of a grade F (which was the 'average' grade achieved in 1988), the target was achieved nationally in summer of 2005. David Blunkett went further and set schools the goal of ensuring 50% of 16-year-olds gained 5 GCSEs or equivalent at grade C and above, requiring schools to devise a mean for 50% of their pupils to achieve the grades previously only obtained by the top 30%, this was achieved by the summer of 2004 with the help of equivalent and largely vocational qualifications.

A number of reports have also suggested the licensing of competing commercial entities to award GCSEs may be contributing to the increasing pass rates, with schools that aggressively switch providers appearing to obtain an advantage in exam pass rates. In response to allegations of grade inflation, a number of schools have switched to other exams, such as the International GCSE, or the International Baccalaureate middle years programme.

=== A-level ===
Between 1963 and 1986 A-Level grades were awarded according to norm-referenced percentile quotas (A <= 10%, B = 15%, C = 10%, D = 15%, E = 20%, O/N = 20%, F/U >= 10% of candidates). The validity of this system was questioned in the early 1980s because, rather than reflecting a standard, norm referencing might have simply maintained a specific proportion of candidates at each grade. In small cohorts this could lead to grades which only indicated a candidate's relative performance against others sitting that particular paper, and so not be comparable between cohorts (e.g., if one year, only 11 candidates were entered for A-Level English nationally, and the next year only 12, this would raise doubt whether the single A awarded in year one was equivalent to the single A awarded in year two). In 1984 the Secondary Examinations Council decided to replace the norm referencing with criteria referencing, wherein grades would be awarded on "examiner judgement". The criteria referencing scheme came into effect in June 1987, and since its introduction examiner judgment, along with the merger of the E and O/N grades and a change to a resitable modular format from June 2002, has increased the percentage of A grade awards from 10 to >25%, and the A-E awards from 70 to >98%.

In 2007 Robert Coe, of Durham University, published a report analysing the historical A-Level awards to candidates who'd obtained the average norm-referenced ALIS TDA/ITDA test scores, he noted:

From 1988 until 2006 the achievement levels have risen by about an average of 2 grades in each subject. Exceptionally, from 1988 the rise appears to be about 3.5 grades for Mathematics.

This suggests that a candidate rejected with a U classification in mathematics in 1988 would likely be awarded a B/C grade in 2012, while in all subjects a 1980s C candidate would now be awarded an A*/A. The OECD noted in 2012, that the same competing commercial entities are licensed to award A-Levels as GCSEs (see above). Every year some are pushed up but virtually none down, resulting in a subtle year-on-year shift. It is possible that one reason for the big increase in the proportion of A-levels that are awarded higher grades has been the need to justify the approximate doubling of the number of students attending university as a result of the conversion of all polytechnics into universities under the provisions of the Further and Higher Education Act 1992.

UK: A-level grades awarded (%'age)
	A*	A (A*+A)	B	C	D	E	O/N	U/F	A–E	entries
1951									75.3	103,803
1963–1986		8–10	15	10	15	20	20	10	68–70	1975: 498,883 1980: 589,270
1982		8.9							68.2	
1985									70.5	634,557
1989		11.4	15.2	16.4	17.4	15.3	10.9	13.4	75.7	682,997
1990		11.7	15.5	16.9	17.7	15.2	10.7	12.3	76.7	684,065
1991		11.9	15.5	16.9	18.1	15.6	10.5	11.5	78.0	699,041
1992		12.8	16.3	17.4	18.0	15.3	9.8	10.4	79.8	731,240
1993		13.8	16.7	17.7	18.1	14.8	9.3	9.6	81.1	734,081
1994		14.8	17.1	18.6	18.1	14.4	8.8	8.1	83	732,974
1995		15.8	17.1	19	18.1	14.1	8.4	7.5	84.1	730,415
1996		16	18	19.8	18.3	13.7	7.8	6.4	85.8	739,163
1997		16	18.9	20.3	18.5	13.4	7.4	5.5	87.1	776,115
1998		16.8	18.9	20.8	18.3	13	7.2	5	87.8	794,262
1999		17.5	19	21	18.3	12.7	6.9	4.6	88.5	783,692
2000		17.8	19.2	21.2	18.5	12.4	6.6	4.3	89.1	771,809
2001		18.6	19.3	21.4	18.1	12.4	6.3	3.9	89.8	748,866
2002		20.7	21.9	22.7	18.1	10.9		5.7	94.3	701,380
2003		21.6	22.9	23	17.8	10.1		4.6	95.4	750,537
2004		22.4	23.4	23.2	17.5	9.5		4	96	766,247
2005		22.8	23.8	23.3	17.2	9.1		3.8	96.2	783,878
2006		24.1	24	23.2	16.6	8.7		3.4	96.6	805,698
2007		25.3	24.4	23.1	16	8.1		3.1	96.9	805,657
2008		25.9	24.9	23.1	15.7	7.6		2.8	97.2	827,737
2009		26.7	25.3	23.1	15.2	7.2		2.5	97.5	846,977
2010	8.1	18.9 (27)	25.2	23.2	15.2	7		2.4	97.6	853,933
2011	8.2	18.8 (27)	25.6	23.6	15.1	6.5		2.2	97.8	867,317
2012	7.9	18.7 (26.6)	26	24	14.9	6.5		2	98	861,819
2013	7.6	18.7 (26.3)	26.6	24.3	14.7	6.2		1.9	98.1	850,752
2014	8.2	17.8 (26)	26.4	24.3	14.8	6.5		2.0	98	833,807
2015	8.2	17.7 (25.9)	26.9	24.5	14.7	6.1		1.9	98.1	850,749
2016	8.1	17.7 (25.8)	27.1	24.7	14.6	5.9		1.9	98.1	836,705
2017	8.3	18.1 (26.3)	28.8	24.3	14.5	5.9		2.1	97.9	828,355
2018	8.0	18.4 (26.4)	26.6	24.0	14.5	6.1		2.4	97.6	811,776
2019	7.8	17.7 (25.5)	26.1	24.2	15.2	6.6		2.4	97.6	801,002
2020 (Note: 2020-21 due to COVID-19 grades were teacher awarded, rather than examined.)	14.4	24.2 (38.6)	27.5	21.8	9.1	2.7		0.3	97.6	781,029
2021	19.1	25.7 (45.8)	25.5	18.2	7.8	3.5		0.2	99.8	824,718
2022	14.6	21.8 (36.4)	26.4	19.8	11.0	4.9		1.6	98.4	848,910
2023	8.9	18.3 (27.2)	26.2	22.5	14.2	7.1		2.7	97.3	867,658

Sources: JCQ statistics for: 2023, 2012, 2011, 2010, , 2008, 2007, 2006, and BBC News,a, also the Guardian, and , and

==== UK A-Level classifications from June 1989 to 2021 ====
- A*
- A
- B
- C
- D
- E
- N/O
- F/U

Note: norm* – June 1963 – 1986 grades allocated per the norm-referenced percentile quotas described above.

=== Higher education ===
The Higher Education Statistics Agency gathers and publishes annual statistics relating to the higher qualifications awarded in the UK. The Students and Qualifiers data sets indicate that the percentage of "GOOD" first degree classifications have increased annually since 1995. For example, 7% of all first-degree students who graduated in the academic year 1995/96 achieved first class honours; by 2008/09 this had risen to 14%.

Between 1995 and 2011, the proportion of upper second class honours awarded for first degree courses increased from 40.42% to 48.38%, whilst lower second class honours dropped from 34.97% to 28.9%. The number of third class honours, "ordinary" (i.e. pass), and unclassified awards dropped substantially during the same period. During this time, the total number of first degrees awarded in the UK increased by 56%, from 212,000 to 331,000.

Note: The doubling of institutions and quadrupling of student numbers, following the Further and Higher Education Act 1992, makes any direct comparison of pre and post 1995 awards non trivial, if not meaningless.

UK: Percentages of 1st Class awards by Institution
	1980	2000	2010	2011	2016	2017
Oxford				29	33.2	33.9
Cambridge	13	29.8	23	26.4	31.7	33.5
Warwick	3	10.8	23	25.5	28.7	27.9
Exeter	4	10.5	19	19.4	23.1	25.3
St. Andrews	7	11.7	20	19.7	28.7	29.8

Source: ,

UK: Percentages of good Honours awards (1st and upper 2nd) by Institution
	1983–4	1984–5	2006	2008	2012	2017
Cambridge	57.2	49.3	84	85	87	91.6
Warwick	34	42	79	76	81	84.4
Exeter	41	45.3	75	80	83	86.3
Robert Gordon	9	12	53	54	55	66.3

Source: Sunday Times Good University Guide, 1983–4 (1st Ed), 1984–5 (2nd Ed), 2006, 2008, 2012

UK: First degree awards
Awards by class	First (1)	%'age	Upper Second (2.1)	%'age	Undivided + Lower Second (2.2)	%'age
1994	~7937	8.4	~38077	40.3	~26361	27.9
1995	16687	7.04	95824	40.42	82898	34.97
1996	17352	6.86	103049	40.76	89533	35.41
1997	18154	7.03	105538	40.87	91534	35.45
1998	19613	7.44	109409	41.50	90805	34.44
1999	20852	8.37	112504	45.14	94036	37.73
2000	21920	8.66	114660	45.31	91770	36.26
2001	24095	8.77	118465	43.14	89750	32.68
2002	26455	9.67	121240	44.31	86650	31.67
2003	28635	10.96	123795	47.37	88260	33.77
2004	30175	11.2	127935	47.5	90470	33.59
2005	32465	11.59	132770	47.4	92605	33.06
2006	34825	12.04	137235	47.46	94265	32.6
2007	40260	12.52	149805	46.59	103340	32.14
2008	41150	13.34	148265	48.05	95145	30.84
2009	43125	13.99	148360	48.12	93030	30.17
2010	46830	14.4	156950	48.26	96970	29.82
2011	53210	15.5	166095	48.38	99210	28.9
2012	61605	15.76	178425	45.63	100310	25.66
2013	69625	17.24	187365	46.40	98145	24.30
2014	79435	18.83	198405	47.02	96030	22.76
2015	81640	22.01	183680	49.52	85250	22.98
2016	88895	23.62	186565	49.58	81595	21.68
2017	100945	25.76	192395	49.09	79515	20.29
2018	110475	27.83	192425	48.48	76210	19.19
2019	114230	28.38	194600	48.35	76345	18.97
2020	140285	34.86	189445	47.08	60900	15.14

Source: Higher Education Statistics AgencyUniversities' Statistical Record, 1972/73-1993/94 : Undergraduate Records

==== UK first degrees by awards from 1993/4 to 2018/19 ====
- 1st awards
- 2.1 awards
- 2.2 awards
- 3rd + Pass awards
- unclassified

==== UK first degrees by classification from 1993/4 to 2018/19 ====
- 1st
- 2.1
- 2.2
- 3rd + Pass
- Unclassified

== In France ==
Between 2005 and 2016 the proportion of students receiving at least an honor in the general baccalauréat increased by 65%.

== In India ==
In CBSE, a 95 per cent aggregate is 21 times as prevalent today as it was in 2004, and a 90 per cent close to nine times as prevalent. In the CISCE, a 95 per cent is almost twice as prevalent today as it was in 2012. CBSE called a meeting of all 40 school boards early in 2017 to urge them to discontinue “artificial spiking of marks”. CBSE decided to lead by example and promised not to inflate its results. But although the 2017 results have seen a small correction, the board has clearly not discarded the practice completely. Almost 6.5 per cent of mathematics examinees in 2017 scored 95 or more — 10 times higher than in 2004 — and almost 6 per cent of physics examinees scored 95 or more, 35 times more than in 2004.

== See also ==
- Affirmative action – Policies aiming to increase inclusion of people from marginalized groups
- Class rank – Comparative measure of students' performance
- Career and technical education
- Dumbing down – Deliberate oversimplification of intellectual content
- Educational inflation – More higher education reduces its value
- Education
- Flynn effect – 20th-century rise in intelligence test scores
- Educational assessment – Educational evaluation method
- Grading on a curve – Yields an estimate of the testee's position in population
- Latin honors – Phrases for levels of academic distinction
- Medal inflation – Increased number of military awards
- Positional good – Goods whose value is given by desirability rather than quantity
- Valedictorian – Highest-ranked graduate
- Salutatorian – Second highest-ranking student in a class
- The Case Against Education – 2018 book by Bryan Caplan
