= Class rank =

Comparative measure of students' performance

Class rank is a measure of how a student's performance compares to other students in their class. It is commonly also expressed as a percentile. For instance, a student may have a GPA better than 750 of their classmates in a graduating class of 800, which would make their class rank approximately 50 out of 800.

In practical terms, class rank provides a relative performance benchmark rather than an absolute assessment of academic ability. It enables institutions, scholarship committees, and employers to quickly evaluate where a student stands within a defined peer group, especially when grading standards or curricula vary across schools. When expressed as a percentile, class rank further simplifies comparison by indicating the proportion of students a candidate has outperformed. As a result, class rank is often used as a strategic screening and differentiation tool in competitive academic and professional selection processes.

== Use in high schools ==
The use of class rank is currently in practice at about less than half of American high schools. Large public schools are more likely to rank their students than small private schools. Because many admissions officers were frustrated that many applications did not contain a rank, some colleges are using other information provided by high schools, in combination with a student's GPA to estimate a student's class rank. Many colleges say that the absence of a class rank forces them to put more weight on standardized test scores.

== Use in college admissions ==
Colleges often use class rank as a factor in college admissions, although because of differences in grading standards between schools, admissions officers have begun to attach less weight to this factor, both for granting admission, and for awarding scholarships. Class rank is more likely to be used at large schools that are more formulaic in their admissions programs.

=== Percent plans ===
Some U.S. states guarantee that students who achieve a high enough class rank at their high school will be admitted into a state university, in a practice known as percent plans. Students in California who are in the top nine percent of their graduating class, and students in Florida who are in the top twenty percent of their graduating class are guaranteed admission to some state school, but not necessarily any particular institution. The University of Alaska system awards an $11,000 scholarship for four years to students in the top 10% of their graduating class at Alaskan high schools. The top ten percent of students in Texas high schools are guaranteed admission to the state school of their choice, excluding the University of Texas, which only allocates 75% of its incoming freshman class seats to top 6% members.

== See also ==
- Rank-based grading in the United States
- Latin honors
- Salutatorian
- Valedictorian
